= Single Collection+ Achikochi =

- Standard edition cover

Compilation album by Maaya Sakamoto
- Released: July 15, 2020
- Genre: J-pop; Anime song
- Length: 53:11 (disc 1); 62:17 (disc 2)
- Label: FlyingDog
- Producer: Maaya Sakamoto

Maaya Sakamoto chronology
| Kyō Dake no Ongaku (2019) | Single Collection+ Achikochi (2020) | Duets (2021) |

Singles from Single Collection+ Achikochi
- 1. "Hajimari no Umi" Released: July 31, 2013; 2. "Secrear" Released: October 30, 2013 (digital); 3. "Be Mine!" / "Saved" Released: February 5, 2014; 4. "Replica" Released: August 20, 2014; 5. "Shiawase ni Tsuite Watashi ga Shitte Iru Itsutsu no Hōhō" / "Shikisai" Released: January 28, 2015; 6. "Kore Kara" Released: April 1, 2015 (digital); 7. "Anata o Tamotsu Mono" / "Mada Ugoku" Released: June 17, 2015; 8. "Million Clouds" Released: July 27, 2016; 9. "Clear" Released: January 31, 2018; 10. "Hello, Hello" Released: May 23, 2018; 11. "Gyakkō" Released: July 25, 2018; 12. "Uchū no Kioku" Released: July 24, 2019; 13. "Clover" Released: April 3, 2020 (digital)

Single Collection+ Achikochi (Japanese: シングルコレクション+ アチコチ, Hepburn: Shinguru Korekushon Purasu Achikochi) is a compilation album by Japanese voice actress and singer Maaya Sakamoto, released on July 15, 2020, by FlyingDog. The album was released to commemorate her twenty-fifth anniversary in the music industry, and features a comprehensive collection of her tie-in singles from 2013 onward, alongside rare tracks, covers, and previously unreleased songs.

== Background and release ==
The album is Sakamoto's first single collection in approximately eight years since Single Collection+ Mitsubachi (2012), and served as a celebration of Maaya Sakamoto's 25-year career. Achikochi marks a progression in Sakamoto's career following her work on Mitsubachi, where she began to move beyond her initial collaboration with producer Yoko Kanno: Sakamoto commented: "With Mitsubachi, I was transitioning from only knowing one producer [...] to starting to walk on my own, and it was filled with that trial-and-error history. After that, I worked with completely different types of people on each song, and every collaboration was an adventure." She noted that the process was largely free of anxiety, as many singles were created for anime, which allowed her to align her music with the anime's narrative and world. Sakamoto added, "Compared to the time of Mitsubachi, I feel like these past eight years have been about having a solid core within myself while genuinely enjoying being colored by the influences of others.". The album’s title, Achikochi (meaning “here and there” in Japanese), encapsulates the variety of inspirations drawn from her collaborations and anime tie-ins.

The album compiles all her singles features a compilation of single title tracks released from 2013 to 2020, many tied to anime, video games, and other media projects. The album is structured as a two-disc collection, with disc 1 compiling single title tracks in chronological order, primarily anime tie-in songs, while the second disc features collaborations and covers. The first disc highlights the diverse and dynamic nature of Sakamoto's anime-related work. Sakamoto declared she found amusing how disjointed the songs felt in order, due to the sharp contrasts in tone and style. She attributed this variety to her deliberate approach of "betraying the previous song" to avoid creative stagnation The anime tie-ins, often tied to grand themes of protagonists fighting for survival or saving the world, result in significant variations in sound and lyrical mood, a characteristic Sakamoto sees as common among artists deeply engaged in anime music.

The track order of the second disc personally arranged by Sakamoto. These include rare tracks previously exclusive to anime soundtracks, such as Yoko Kanno's compositions "Cloud 9" and "Tell Me What the Rain Knows" from Wolf's Rain, the previously-unreleased track "Flash," which was used the theme song for the mobile game Cardcaptor Sakura: Clear Card Happiness Memories initially announced in 2018, and the latest song released by Sakamoto up to that date, "Clover," which was used opening theme for the anime Arte. It also features cover songs, including Yumi Matsutoya’s "Sotsugyō Shashin" (from the Tamayura OVA) and a cover of Dreams Come True's "Mikazuki," which was Sakamoto's personal choice to cover for the band's tribute album released in 2017. The only new song on the album is the self-cover of "Watashi e," originally written by Sakamoto for the idol group Negicco. Sakamoto revealed that she initially did not have plans to cover it, as most songs she had written for others felt “off” when she tried singing them herself. However, as over the years writing lyrics for others had become an important part in her career, recording one of those songs as a self-cover on Achikochi obtained a special meaning.

The album was released in two formats: a two-disc standard edition, and the limited edition including a Blu-ray disc. The Blu-ray disc has approximately 150 minutes of content, featuring a remastered recording of the Maaya Sakamoto Open Air Museum 2017 performance at Itsukushima Shrine (originally broadcast on Wowow), live footage from the FlyingDog 10th Anniversary Live "Inu Fes!" (2019), and a collection of Sakamoto's 10 music videos from 2013 to 2020.

== Commercial performance ==
Single Collection+ Achikochi debuted at number 5 on the Oricon Weekly Albums chart, selling 15,275 copies on its first week. The album charted for nine weeks, with reported sales totaling 20,000 copies.

== Track listing ==
Single Collection+ Achikochi - disc 1
| No. | Title | Lyrics | Music | Arrangement | Length |
|---|---|---|---|---|---|
| 1. | "Hajimari no Umi" (はじまりの海) | Taeko Onuki | Onuki | Toshiyuki Mori | 3:57 |
| 2. | "Be Mine!" | Maaya Sakamoto | The Band Apart | Ryo Eguchi; The Band Apart | 4:02 |
| 3. | "Saved." | Shōko Suzuki | Suzuki | Ryūji Yamamoto | 5:18 |
| 4. | "Replica" (レプリカ) | Sakamoto | Takahito Uchisawa | Uchisawa | 4:00 |
| 5. | "Shiawase ni Tsuite Watashi ga Shitte Iru Itsutsu no Hōhō" (幸せについて私が知っている5つの方) | Yuho Iwasato | Rasmus Faber | Faber | 4:40 |
| 6. | "Shikisai" (色彩) | Sakamoto | La La Larks | La La Larks | 4:33 |
| 7. | "Million Clouds" | Sakamoto | Frida Sundemo | Shin Kono | 4:56 |
| 8. | "Clear" | Sakamoto | Yoshiki Mizuno | Kono | 4:15 |
| 9. | "Hello, Hello" (ハロー、ハロー) | Sakamoto | Sakamoto | Zentaro Watanabe | 4:29 |
| 10. | "Gyakkō" (逆光) | Sakamoto | Ichiyo Izawa | Izawa; Eguchi | 4:47 |
| 11. | "Kūhaku" (空白) | Sakamoto | La La Larks | La La Larks | 5:02 |
| 12. | "Uchū no Kioku" (宇宙の記憶) | Ringo Sheena | Sheena | Sheena | 3:12 |
| Total length: | | | | | 53:11 |

Single Collection+ Achikochi - disc 2
| No. | Title | Lyrics | Music | Arrangement | Length |
|---|---|---|---|---|---|
| 1. | "Cloud 9" | Iwasato | Yoko Kanno | Kanno | 5:00 |
| 2. | "Flash" | Sakamoto | Keiichi Tomita | Tomita | 4:23 |
| 3. | "Anata o Tamotsu Mono" (with Cornelius) | Shintaro Sakamoto | Keigo Oyamada | Oyamada | 3:58 |
| 4. | "Se Cre Aile" (セクレアール) | Natsumi | Solaya | Solaya | 4:41 |
| 5. | "Arakawa Shōkei" (荒川小景) (Tomita Lab feat. Maaya Sakamoto) | Takaki Horigome | Tomita | Tomita | 6:12 |
| 6. | "Lazy Line Painter Jane (Note: Belle and Sebastian cover, originally included on Atsushi Suemitsu's album From Your Pianist (2012).)" (Atsushi Suemitsu feat. Maaya Sakamoto) | Stuart Murdoch; Isobel Campbell; Richard Colburn; Stuart David; Christopher Geddes; Stephen Jackson; Sarah Martin; Monica Queen | Murdoch; Campbell; Colburn; David; Geddes; Jackson; Martin; Queen | Atsushi Suemitsu | 6:17 |
| 7. | "Mada Ugoku" (with Cornelius) | Shintaro Sakamoto | Oyamada | Oyamada | 5:50 |
| 8. | "Tell Me What the Rain Knows" | Chris Mosdell | Kanno | Kanno | 1:42 |
| 9. | "Mikazuki (Note: Dreams Come True cover, originally included on the tribute album The Best Covers of Dreams Come True: Dori Uta Vol.1 (2017).)" (三日月) | Miwa Yoshida | Yoshida | Yamamoto | 5:03 |
| 10. | "Sotsugyō Shashin (Note: Yumi Matsutoya cover, originally included on the soundtrack album Tamayura Main Theme Song Collection: Sotsugyō Shashin (2016).)" (卒業写真) | Matsutoya | Matsutoya | Hiroyasu Yano | 4:38 |
| 11. | "Kore Kara" (これから) | Sakamoto | Sakamoto | Kono | 5:16 |
| 12. | "Clover" (クローバー) | Sakamoto | Kōji Mizuguchi | Kono | 5:16 |
| 13. | "Watashi e" (私へ) | Sakamoto | Connie | Yamamoto | 4:44 |
| Total length: | | | | | 62:17 |

== Charts ==
Chart performance for Single Collection+ Achikochi
| Chart (2020) | Peak position |
|---|---|
| Japan (Oricon) | 5 |
| Japan Hot Albums (Billboard Japan) | 4 |
