= Music of Fate/Grand Order =

Music from the video game Fate/Grand Order

Fate/Grand Order discography
- Soundtrack albums: 12
- Live albums: 2
- Singles: 6

Fate/Grand Order is a role-playing game (RPG) developed by Lasengle and published by Aniplex from 2015. The story follows Ritsuka Fujimaru, a Master candidate that participates in a mission to correct the distortions of the past to prevent the extinction of humanity by going back in time. It was later adapted by Lay-duce into an animated film in 2016 directed by Hitoshi Nanba with music direction by Ryo Kawasaki. It would also be adapted by CloverWorks into an anime television series which was broadcast between 2019 and 2020, and an original video animation (OVA) series released from June to September 2021, directed by Seiji Kishi with music direction by Keita Haga and Yasuharu Takanashi. The discography of Fate/Grand Order and the anime adaptations consists of twelve soundtracks, 2 live albums, six singles, and five remix albums.

== Albums ==
=== Fate/Grand Order Original Soundtrack VII ===
Fate/Grand Order Original Soundtrack VII is a soundtrack album for the Fate/Grand Order role-playing game, and was first released on July 30, 2025, in Japan by Aniplex bearing the catalog number SVWC-70718.

== Singles ==
=== Gyakkō ===
"Gyakkō" (逆光; lit. 'Backlight') is a song by the Japanese singer and voice actress Maaya Sakamoto. It was released on July 25, 2018, by FlyingDog. The song was later featured on her compilation album Single Collection+ Achikochi (2020).

=== Shikisai ===
"Shikisai" (色彩(しきさい); lit. "Color") is a single by Maaya Sakamoto and the theme song for the Fate/Grand Order video game by Type-Moon. It was released on January 28, 2015 in Japan by FlyingDog bearing the catalog number VTCL-96.

=== Yakudō ===
"Yakudō" (躍動, Yakudō; lit. 'Vitality')

=== Tokei ===
"Tokei" (時計; lit. 'Clock') is a song also performed by the Japanese singer and voice actress Maaya Sakamoto and was released as a digital single on December 28, 2025 through FlyingDog. "Tokei" served as the theme song for the final chapter of the smartphone role-playing game Fate/Grand Order.

=== Dokuhaku ===
"Dokuhaku" (独白; lit. 'Monologue')

== Charts ==
Albums	Release date	Label	Format	Peak Oricon chart positions
Fate/Grand Order Original Soundtrack VII	July 30, 2025	Aniplex (SVWC-70718)	CD	11
"Gyakkō"	July 25, 2018	FlyingDog	CD	7
"Shikisai / Shiawase ni Tsuite Watashi ga Shitte Iru Itsutsu no Hōhō"	January 28, 2015	FlyingDog (VTCL-96)	CD	9
