= Clover (Maaya Sakamoto song) =

- Digital single cover

Single by Maaya Sakamoto

from the album Single Collection+ Achikochi
- Language: Japanese
- Released: April 3, 2020
- Studio: HAL Studio
- Genre: J-pop; Anime song
- Length: 4:29
- Label: FlyingDog
- Composer: Koji Mizuguchi
- Lyricist: Maaya Sakamoto
- Producer: Maaya Sakamoto

Maaya Sakamoto singles chronology
| "Uchū no Kioku" (2019) | "Clover" (2020) | "Yakudō" / "Dokuhaku" (2020) |

Music video
- "Clover" on YouTube

"Clover" (Japanese: クローバー, Hepburn: Kurōbā) is a song by Japanese singer and voice actress Maaya Sakamoto, released as a digital single on April 3, 2020, by FlyingDog. The song served as the opening theme for the television anime Arte, which began airing the same month.

== Background and release ==
In late 2019, Maaya Sakamoto released her tenth studio album, Kyō Dake no Ongaku, her first studio album in four years. The subsequent live tour promoting the album sold out in multiple cities, including Tokyo, Kanagawa, Nagoya, and Osaka, with an additional Countdown Live performance on New Year's Eve at the International Forum Hall A also selling out. Continuing her momentum into her twenty-fifth debut anniversary year, "Clover" was announced in February 2020 as the opening theme for the television anime series Arte. Alongside the announcement, a second key visual and promotional video for Arte were released, featuring a portion of the song.

Sakamoto commented that the song was written during the COVID-19 pandemic, and she was glad to release an upbeat and positive song during that period. The anime's director and staff requested a "straightforward, bright, and charming song" without hidden meanings or darker undertones, aligning with the story of Arte, which follows a female protagonist aspiring to become a painter in an era when women working was considered unthinkable. Sakamoto felt a personal connection to the story of a woman striving to open uncharted doors and initially wanted to infuse some of her own experiences on the lyrics. Accordingly, she attempted to convey this message while maintaining a light-hearted vibe. She explained: "While keeping the cute vibe in mind, I also wanted to subtly weave in the difficulties of tackling something no one has done before, based on my own experiences."

Due to Sakamoto feeling that the track was "a bit too cute and youthful [to be] my first single after turning 40," a decision was made to release the song only digitally, and to eventually include it on her compilation album Achikochi.

== Composition and themes ==
"Clover" was written by Sakamoto, with music composed by Koji Mizuguchi and arranged by Shin Kono. The song, described as "an uplifting and dynamic track that embodies facing challenges head-on," was written specifically for the anime Arte, and complements the themes appearing on it. Thematically, "Clover" explores perseverance and hope, with Sakamoto drawing inspiration from Arte's curiosity and refusal to be discouraged by failure. When writing the song's lyrics, Sakamoto highlighted the emotional resonance of the protagonist's journey, noting that even moments of frustration are followed by the renewal of a new day. When the song was official announced, Sakamoto shared the following comment about "Clover" and its connection to Arte: "With ambition and curiosity, never shying away from being different, and not giving up even when things do not go well —Arte’s attitude inspired me personally. There are days when I shed tears of frustration, but after a night’s sleep, I wake up to a new morning. I hope listeners can feel the energy of getting back up after a fall, opening a door, and moving forward through this theme song."

== Critical reception ==
Writing for Animate Times, music critic Junichi Tsukagoshi praised the song's vibrant sound, noting the familiar guitar and strings in the arrangement by Shin Kono, despite it being Sakamoto's first collaboration with composer Koji Mizuguchi. He described the song as youthful and sparkling, likening its energy to earlier Sakamoto tracks such as "Clear," "Magic Number," and "Platinum." Tsukagoshi highlighted lyrics such as “Every day, I am born anew, waking up reborn” and “Go beyond what’s impossible,”, noting that Sakamoto's personal experiences lend authenticity and weight to these encouraging words. He emphasized that the song's direct and powerful lyrics, balanced with realistic lines like “Not every dream comes true, and I know that,” reflect Sakamoto's thoughtful and genuine approach, making "Clover" a particularly uplifting track for challenging times.

== Chart performance ==
"Clover" peaked at number 31 on the Oricon Digital Singles chart. On the Billboard Japan charts, it peaked at number 35 on the download chart.

== Track listing ==
Clover - digital single
| No. | Title | Lyrics | Music | Arrangement | Length |
|---|---|---|---|---|---|
| 1. | "Clover" (クローバー) | Maaya Sakamoto | Koji Mizuguchi | Shin Kono | 4:29 |

== Personnel ==
Credits adapted from the liner notes of Single Collection+ Achikochi.

- Maaya Sakamoto – songwriting, vocals, backing vocals, production
- Koji Mizuguchi – songwriting
- Shin Kono – arrangements, acoustic piano
- Yasuo Sano – drums
- Takashi Ebinuma – bass
- Tsuneo Imahori – guitar
- Mio Strings – strings
- Toshihiko Miyoshi – mixing engineer
- Hiroaki Yamazaki – recording engineer
- Yoshinori Nakayama – recording engineer
