= Follow Me Up =

Studio album by Maaya Sakamoto
- Released: September 30, 2015
- Recorded: 2013–15
- Genre: Pop
- Length: 72:03
- Label: FlyingDog
- Producer: Maaya Sakamoto

Maaya Sakamoto chronology
Singer-Songwriter (2013)	Follow Me Up (2015)	Kyō Dake no Ongaku (2019)

Singles from Follow Me Up
- 1. "Hajimari no Umi" Released: July 31, 2013; 2. "Saved." Released: February 5, 2014; 3. "Be Mine!" Released: February 5, 2014; 4. "Replica" Released: August 20, 2014; 5. "Shiawase ni Tsuite Watashi ga Shitte Iru Itsutsu no Hōhō" Released: January 28, 2015; 6. "Kore Kara" Released: April 1, 2015

Follow Me Up (stylized as FOLLOW ME UP) is the ninth studio album by Japanese singer Maaya Sakamoto. It was released on September 30, 2015, through FlyingDog. The limited edition came with a DVD including the music videos for the singles "Hajimari no Umi", "Be Mine!", "Replica" and "Shiawase ni Tsuite Watashi ga Shitte Iru Itsutsu no Hōhō".

== Commercial performance ==
Follow Me Up entered the daily Oricon Albums Chart at number 5. It moved up two spots to number 3 the following day, selling 6,000 copies. The album stayed at number 3 on its third day on the chart, selling 2,000 copies. Follow Me Up debuted at number 4 on the weekly Oricon Albums Chart, with 15,000 copies sold in its first week, marking Sakamoto's fifth consecutive studio album to debut within the top ten. The album charted for twelve weeks, selling a reported total of 22,000 copies.

== Track listing ==
Follow Me Up CD
No.	Title	Writer(s)	Arranger(s)	Length
1.	"Follow Me"	Maaya Sakamoto	Zentarō Watanabe; M. Sakamoto	5:08
2.	"Be Mine!"	M. Sakamoto; The Band Apart	The Band Apart; Ryō Eguchi; Tōru Ishitsuka	4:02
3.	"Sanagi" (さなぎ, "Pupa")	M. Sakamoto; Katsutoshi Kitagawa	Kitagawa; Yōji Makino	4:24
4.	"Saved."	Shōko Suzuki	Ryūji Yamamoto	5:18
5.	"Tokyo Samui" (東京寒い, "Tokyo Cold")	Shintaro Sakamoto; Cornelius	Cornelius	5:03
6.	"Arco" (アルコ, Aruko)	Yuho Iwasato; Yoko Kanno	Kanno	5:40
7.	"Shiawase ni Tsuite Watashi ga Shitte Iru Itsutsu no Hōhō"	Iwasato; Rasmus Faber	Faber	4:40
8.	"Hajimari no Umi"	Taeko Onuki	Toshiyuki Mori	3:57
9.	"Kore Kara"	M. Sakamoto	Shin Kōno; M. Sakamoto	5:16
10.	"Waiting for the Rain"	Faber	Faber; Martin Persson	4:24
11.	"Road Movie" (ロードムービー, Rōdo Mūbī)	Iwasato; Caoli Cano	Watanabe; Cano	5:24
12.	"That Is to Say"	M. Sakamoto; H-Wonder	H-Wonder	4:53
13.	"Replica"	M. Sakamoto; Takahito Uchisawa	Uchisawa; Ishitsuka	4:00
14.	"Kasuka na Melody" (かすかなメロディ, Kasuka na Merodi, "Faint Melody")	S. Sakamoto; Yu Sakai	Kōno	4:40
15.	"Iris" (アイリス, Airisu)	M. Sakamoto	Suzuki; Takuo Yamamoto; M. Sakamoto	5:07
Total length:				72:03

Limited Edition DVD: Maaya Sakamoto Music Video Collection
No.	Title	Director(s)	Length
1.	"Hajimari no Umi" (Music Video)	Shintarō Ehara	4:13
2.	"Be Mine!" (Music Video)	Ehara	4:04
3.	"Replica" (Music Video)	Ehara	4:00
4.	"Shiawase ni Tsuite Watashi ga Shitte Iru Itsutsu no Hōhō" (Music Video)	Ehara	4:49
Total length:			17:06

== Charts ==
Chart (2015)	Peak position	Sales
Japan Daily Albums (Oricon)	3	22,000
Japan Weekly Albums (Oricon)	4	22,000
Japan Hot Albums (Billboard)	6	22,000
Japan Top Albums Sales (Billboard)	3	22,000
