= Replica (song) =

Single by Maaya Sakamoto

from the album Follow Me Up
- Released: August 20, 2014
- Studio: Aobadai Studio; Victor Studio
- Genre: Pop
- Length: 4:00
- Label: FlyingDog
- Songwriters: Maaya Sakamoto; Takahito Uchisawa
- Producer: Maaya Sakamoto

Maaya Sakamoto singles chronology
"Saved." / "Be Mine!" (2014)	"Replica" (2014)	"Shiawase ni Tsuite Watashi ga Shitte Iru Itsutsu no Hōhō" / "Shikisai" (2015)

Audio sample
- "Replica": file; help

Music video
- "Replica" on YouTube

"Replica" (レプリカ, Repurika) is a song recorded by Japanese singer Maaya Sakamoto, from the album Follow Me Up. It was released as the album's fourth single on August 20, 2014, through FlyingDog. The song was written by Sakamoto and composed by Takahito Uchisawa from the band Androp. It served as the second opening theme to the Tokyo MX anime series M3: The Dark Metal.

== Chart performance ==
"Replica" debuted on the Oricon Singles Chart at number 17, with 7,000 copies sold in first charting week. The single charted on the chart for four consecutive weeks, selling a reported total of 9,000 copies sold.

== Track listing ==
No.	Title	Writer(s)	Arranger(s)	Length
1.	"Replica" (レプリカ, Repurika)	Maaya Sakamoto; Takahito Uchisawa	Uchisawa; Tōru Ishitsuka	4:00
2.	"Coming Up"	Sakamoto; Masakazu Hara	Hara	5:08
3.	"Replica" (Instrumental)	Uchisawa	Uchisawa; Ishitsuka	4:00
4.	"Coming Up" (Instrumental)	Hara	Hara	5:05
Total length:				18:15

Limited Edition Mini Live Album: Duo
No.	Title	Writer(s)	Arranger(s)	Length
1.	"Platinum"	Yuho Iwasato; Yoko Kanno	Kento Ohgiya	4:07
2.	"Be Mine!"	Maaya Sakamoto; The Band Apart	Ohgiya	4:01
3.	"Neko to Inu" (ねこといぬ, "Cats and Dogs")	Sakamoto; Kanno	Ohgiya	4:36
4.	"Singer-songwriter" (シンガーソングライター, Shingā Songuraitā)	Sakamoto	Ohgiya	5:35
Total length:				18:20

== Credits and personnel ==
Personnel

- Vocals, backing vocals – Maaya Sakamoto
- Songwriting – Maaya Sakamoto, Takahito Uchisawa
- Arrangement – Takahito Uchisawa, Tōru Ishitsuka
- Bass – Ichiro Yoshida
- Drums – Noriyasu Kawamura
- Guitar, programming – Takahito Uchisawa
- Strings – Tomomi Tokunaga Strings
- Engineering – Takahiro Okubo, Tohru Takayama
- Mixing – Tohru Takayama
- Mastering – Hiroshi Kawasaki

== Charts ==
Chart (2015)	Peak position	Sales
Japan Daily Singles (Oricon)	17	9,000
Japan Weekly Singles (Oricon)	17	9,000
Japan Hot 100 (Billboard)	24	9,000
Japan Hot Animation (Billboard)	6	9,000
Japan Hot Singles Sales (Billboard)	16	9,000
