= Hello, Hello (Maaya Sakamoto song) =

Single by Maaya Sakamoto

from the album Single Collection+ Achikochi
- Language: Japanese
- B-side: "Tsuki no Hanashi"
- Released: May 23, 2018
- Studio: Victor Studio
- Genre: J-pop; Anime song
- Length: 4:29
- Label: FlyingDog
- Songwriter: Maaya Sakamoto
- Producer: Maaya Sakamoto

Maaya Sakamoto singles chronology
"Clear" (2018)	"Hello, Hello" (2018)	"Gyakkō" (2018)

Music video
- "Hello, Hello" on YouTube

"Hello, Hello" (Japanese: ハロー、ハロー, Hepburn: Harō, Harō) is a song by Japanese singer and voice actress Maaya Sakamoto, released as her twenty-eighth single on May 23, 2018, by FlyingDog. Written and composed by Sakamoto, the song served as ending theme for the television anime series Amanchu! Advance, which premiered in April of that year.

== Background and release ==
"Hello, Hello" was specially written for Amanchu! Advance, and it marks the first time Sakamoto not only wrote lyrics, but also composed the title track of one of her singles. Regarding the challenge of composing the song, Sakamoto commented: "I have only been composing for a few years, and I cannot churn out songs to order like a professional songwriter, so tackling a theme song still takes courage. But Amanchu! is by director Junichi Sato, the same as Tamayura: Sotsugyō Shashin for which I wrote "Kore Kara". We had worked together before, and he trusts me, so I thought this would be a great chance to try composing my first single title track." According to Sakamoto, Sato requested a "cute song that listeners could immerse themselves in while savoring the afterglow after the episode ends", which is what Sakamoto attempted to achieve.

Additionally, she admittedly felt less pressure the create the song, as it was commissioned to be an ending theme, instead of the opening theme. The process proved remarkably effortless: without overthinking, Sakamoto casually played the piano and found the melody emerging naturally, aiming for a "light" J-pop number that "exists casually" rather than dramatically belting out, contrasting her typically complex songs, also having in mind the production team's request for "a cute, upbeat" melody. She then brought the demo to arranger Zentaro Watanabe, and asked for an arrangement that was reminiscent of Chara's "Yasashii Kimochi", one of Watanabe's signature productions. According to Sakamoto, she wanted to evoke a nostalgic blend of youthful perspective and adult reflection for the lyrics of "Hello, Hello". Written from both the viewpoint of a high school student and an adult looking back, the song captures fleeting, everyday moments—like walking with bread from the school store or sitting atop hallway lockers—that linger in memory. Sakamoto has shared that the song reflects trivial yet vivid high school experiences, akin to the "top layer" of memories, while also imagining her current self calling out to her future self at 80, asking to be remembered. She further commented: "You cannot remember each of the 365 days in a year [...] [there] are tons of trivial memories no one ever recalls, buried forever. But something was there. I wanted to write about those unremembered parts of me whispering, "Hey, hey—I was here, you know."

The release of the single was first announced in late March 2018, and the song was first performed live during Sakamoto's Live Tour 2018: All Clear.

The b-side to the single "Tsuki no Hanashi", contrasts the title track as a more mature ballad. The song was crafted with Sakamoto providing lyrics while commissioning her first-ever composition from longtime arranger Ryuji Yamamoto, whom she had always wanted to collaborate with in this capacity. She gave him complete creative freedom, simply requesting "an adult ballad," resulting in an annui, moody track she instantly adored for its low-key setting, fresh low-register horns, and cello that evoked floating planets in her mind. Inspired by the music's detached, observational tone, Sakamoto penned lyrics from a macro (the Earth and the Moon) yet intimately micro perspective (one's bedroom), capturing quiet acceptance of not-altogether-happy moments.

As a bonus track, the single includes a live version of "Million Clouds," the opening theme from the previous season of Amanchu!, recorded at the Itsukushima Shrine in Hiroshima. Additionally, the single included an application form for a premium live event exclusively for purchasers, which was held in Tokyo and Fukuoka, with a total of 1,000 winners invited. Applications were accepted from May 23 to June 24, 2018, using a serial code enclosed only in the first production run.

== Critical reception ==
Writing for Real Sound magazine, music critic Tomoyuki Mori praised "Hello, Hello," noting that its lyrics brilliantly capture the moment of reflecting on the present from a future perspective and starting to advance toward what comes next. He highlighted the comfortable pop sensibility in the word choices and the seamless integration of lyrics and melody, which he said demonstrate Sakamoto's distinctive style as a singer-songwriter, while also commending the arrangement for its striking psychedelic elements.

== Commercial performance ==
"Hello, Hello" debuted and peaked at number 15 on the Oricon Singles Chart, selling 5,656 copies on its first week. The single charted for five weeks, with reported sales totaling 7,216 copies.

== Track listing ==
All lyrics are written by Maaya Sakamoto.

Hello, Hello - CD single
No.	Title	Music	Arrangement	Length
1.	"Hello, Hello" (ハロー、ハロー)	Maaya Sakamoto	Zentaro Watanabe	4:29
2.	"Tsuki no Hanashi" (月の話)	Ryuji Yamamoto	Yamamoto	5:32
3.	"Million Clouds" (acoustic live ver.)	Frida Sundemo	Shin Kono	4:47
4.	"Hello, Hello" (Instrumental)			4:29
5.	"Tsuki no Hanashi" (Instrumental)			5:29
Total length:				24:46

== Personnel ==
Credits adapted from the liner notes of the "Hello, Hello" CD single.

- Maaya Sakamoto – vocals, backing vocals, production
- Zentaro Watanabe – arrangements, guitar, acoustic piano & programming
- Yasuo Sano – drums
- Hiromitsu Takasu – recording & mixing engineering
- Toshiyuki Kawahito – assistant engineer
- Hiroshi Kawasaki – mastering
- Masao Fukuda – A&R direction
- Hideki Kawaguchi – artist management
- Shirō Sasaki – executive production

== Charts ==
=== Weekly charts ===
Weekly chart performance for "Hello, Hello"
Chart (2018)	Peak position
Japan (Oricon)	15
Japan Hot 100 (Billboard Japan)	43
Japan Top Singles Sales (Billboard Japan)	18
Japan Hot Animation (Billboard Japan)	13
Japan Download Songs (Billboard Japan)	62
