= Single Collection+ Hotchpotch =

Compilation album by Maaya Sakamoto
- Released: December 16, 1999
- Genres: J-pop; anime song
- Length: 1:09:27
- Label: Victor Entertainment
- Producer: Yoko Kanno

Maaya Sakamoto chronology
Dive (1998)	Single Collection+ Hotchpotch (1999)	Lucy (2001)

Singles from Single Collection+ Hotchpotch
- 1. "Yakusoku wa Iranai" Released: April 24, 1996; 2. "Gift" Released: September 22, 1997; 3. "Kiseki no Umi" Released: April 22, 1998; 4. "Platinum" Released: October 21, 1999

Single Collection+ Hotchpotch (シングルコレクション＋(プラス)ハチポチ, Shinguru Korekushon Purasu Hachipochi) is the first compilation album released by Japanese singer Maaya Sakamoto. The album was originally released in Japan by Victor Entertainment in 1999.

== Background and release ==
The idea behind releasing Hotchpotch came partly to compile her 8-cm singles before they were discontinued, gathering tracks from singles and soundtracks. She titled the album Hachipochi (in katakana) after the English word "hotchpotch," representing the idea of multiple things mixed together. The plus (+) on the title represents the new songs included as bonus apart from the singles. She further explained the idea of the album as to keep Sakamoto's anime tie-in songs separate from tracks intended for her studio albums. In this line, Sakamoto explained: "Hachipochi was produced by Yoko Kanno [but] even though it was one producer, she had me sing such a wide range of sounds. The original Maaya Sakamoto albums and the anime tie-in songs actually had slightly different directions at times, so it felt tricky to blend the singles into the original albums. In a way, we had no choice but to separate them."

Hotchpotch primarily compiles Maaya Sakamoto's early anime tie-in singles and soundtrack contributions from 1996 to 1999. "Yakusoku wa Iranai" was her debut single and also served as the opening theme for The Vision of Escaflowne, while "Tomodachi", "Pocket o Kara ni Shite", and "Hikari no Naka e" were used as insert and image songs from the same series; "Bokura no Rekishi" was used as theme song for the radio drama Clamp School Detectives, while "Gift" was used as ending theme for the Clamp School Detectives TV anime series. "Kiseki no Umi" served as opening theme for Record of Lodoss War: Chronicles of the Heroic Knight, "Platinum" as opening theme for the Sakura Card Arc of Cardcaptor Sakura, and "Light of Love" was used as image song for Brain Powerd. Non-tie-ins include "Kimi ni Ai ni Ikō" (b-side to "Gift") and "Active Heart" (b-side to "Kiseki no Umi"), "24" (b-side to "Platinum), and "Pilot" (b-side to "Hashiru"). The only two previously-unreleased songs at the time of this release were "Koibito ni Tsuite" and "Call Your Name". "Koibito ni Tsuite" is the Japanese-lyric version of Sakamoto's song "Dreams in a Pie", which was used as insert song on the Dreamcast video game Napple Tale: Arsia in Daydream released in 2000, while "Call Your Name" served as ending theme for the radio drama Escaflowne: Prologue.

On July 5, 2005, the album was released in the United States by Geneon Entertainment USA, becoming her first US release. This edition features the same track listing as the Japanese release, but includes English translations of the song titles in brackets on the back cover and booklet. That same year, Sakamoto attended the US Anime Expo 2005 held in Anaheim, California, invited by Geneon, where she performed songs from Hotchpotch.

On March 24, 2010, the album was re-issued by FlyingDog.

== Critical reception ==
Tower Records praised Hotchpotch as an essential debut singles collection, highlighting the "straightforward and crystal-clear" quality of Sakamoto's voice which "is sure to captivate every listener," and affirming her "more than enough charm and skill as a female vocalist" beyond her anime and game ties. In a 2010 retrospective review on the album for Tower Records, Toshihiro Baba lauded this compilation, noting melodies that could be reminiscent of Carole King and Motown music ("Tomodachi", "Bokura no Rekishi"), and deeming the single tracks as a "tasteful pop" assortment, featuring "comfortable tempos, skillfully deployed sounds, and [Sakamoto's] vocals with a touch of melancholy." Additionally, Baba noted how the final three tracks showcase different facets of Sakamoto's vocal expression with particular emphasis on "Call My Name", which, in Baba's opinion "[felt] like stepping into a new chapter" on Sakamoto's career. On the other hand, Japanese magazine CD Journal praised Yoko Kanno's "healing world music" production on the record and, while noting similarities to Mimori Yusa, noted that "as a subculture idol, [Sakamoto] is undeniably more thorough" who "excels at satisfying the snobbery of otaku fans."

== Commercial performance ==
Hotchpotch debuted at number 14 on the Oricon Weekly Albums Chart, selling 23,170 copies on its first week. The album charted for nine weeks with reported sales totaling 60,130 copies.

== Track listing ==
All lyrics are written by Yuho Iwasato, except where noted; all music is composed by Yoko Kanno.

No.	Title	Lyrics	Length
1.	"Yakusoku wa Iranai" (約束はいらない, lit. 'I Don't Need Promises')		3:35
2.	"Tomodachi" (ともだち, lit. 'Friend')		3:41
3.	"Bokura no Rekishi" (ボクらの歴史, lit. 'Our History')		4:21
4.	"Gift"		5:48
5.	"Kimi ni Ai ni Ikō" (君に会いにいこう, lit. 'I'll Go Meet You')		5:14
6.	"Hikari no Naka e" (光の中へ, lit. 'Inside the Light')		4:40
7.	"Light of love"		7:54
8.	"Kiseki no Umi" (奇跡の海, lit. 'Sea of Miracles')		4:09
9.	"Active Heart"		4:15
10.	"Pilot" (パイロット)	Maaya Sakamoto	3:55
11.	"Platinum" (プラチナ)		4:11
12.	"24"	Kazumi Someya	4:49
13.	"Koibito ni Tsuite" (恋人について, lit. 'About My Lover')	Yōji Kubota	4:22
14.	"Pocket o Kara ni Shite" (ポケットを空にして, lit. 'Empty Your Pockets')		4:08
15.	"Call Your Name"	Sakamoto	4:17
Total length:			1:09:27

== Charts ==
Chart	Peak position	Sales
Oricon Weekly Albums	14	60,130
