= Uchū no Kioku =

Single by Maaya Sakamoto

from the album Single Collection+ Achikochi
- Language: Japanese
- B-side: "Jokyoku"; "Ashita o Shiranai"
- Released: July 24, 2019
- Studio: Victor Studio
- Genre: Jazz pop; anime song
- Length: 3:15
- Label: FlyingDog
- Songwriter: Ringo Sheena
- Producers: Ringo Sheena; Maaya Sakamoto

Maaya Sakamoto singles chronology
"Gyakko" (2018)	"Uchū no Kioku" (2019)	"Clover" (2020)

Music video
- "Uchū no Kioku" on YouTube

"Uchū no Kioku" (宇宙の記憶; lit. 'Memories of the Universe') is a song by Japanese singer and voice actress Maaya Sakamoto, released as her thirtieth single on July 24, 2019, by FlyingDog. The song was written, composed, and arranged by Ringo Sheena, marking the first collaboration between these two artists. The song served as opening theme of BEM, the fiftieth-anniversary remake of the Japanese animation classic Humanoid Monster Bem, which aired on TV Tokyo and other networks.

== Background and release ==
The collaboration between Sheena and Sakamoto came about upon Sakamoto being selected to perform the opening theme for BEM, which is a reimagining of Humanoid Monster Bem set in a city modeled after New York City. Sakamoto voiced a character in the anime, credited as "Mysterious Woman," whose identity is revealed at the story's climax.

Familiar with Sheena's work since her debut, Sakamoto contacted her to request her involvement on the theme song, believing her musical approach would suit the anime's tone. Sheena agreed, and she took charge of the entire production of the song, handling its lyrics, composition, and arrangements, and also oversaw all aspects of the song's production, including vocal and instrumental recordings. Production also featured contributions from the jazz band Soil & "Pimp" Sessions, known for prior collaborations with Sheena. Their involvement in the instrumental recording complemented the song's jazz elements, aligning with the anime's aesthetic.

The single's B-side includes a new song, "Jokyoku", written and composed by Sakamoto herself, as well as "Ashita o Shiranai", a cover from her participation in the 2018 tribute album to The Band Apart.

== Composition and themes ==
The lyrics of "Uchū no Kioku" reflect on the themes of BEM, which addresses human folly and the concept of unrewarded righteousness. The song is written from the perspective of a goddess observing humanity from the universe, combining philosophical lyrics with a jazz melody. Sakamoto noted that the lyrics were distinct from her own writing style and expressed complex ideas. The melody's rhythm was designed to match the jazz arrangement, creating a unique singing experience for Sakamoto, who initially found it challenging but later adapted to its structure.

During the recording process, Sheena provided vocal directions, including instructing Sakamoto to sing the climactic chorus in a whisper rather than a powerful style, which Sakamoto found suitable for the song. Sheena also requested an ad-libbed section in the interlude, where Sakamoto voiced a queen-like figure reacting to humanity’s actions with sighs, conveying both exasperation and affection.

== Critical reception ==
Writing for Real Sound magazine, music critic Tomoyuki Mori gave a positive review on "Uchū no Kioku," noting how it projects a unique chemistry that only the collaboration between Ringo and Sakamoto could generate. He further praised the song's "thrilling jazz sound" by Soil & "Pimp" Sessions, its "melody with sensual allure," and its "lyrics that fully leverage the beauty of the Japanese language."

== Commercial performance ==
"Uchū no Kioku" debuted at number 21 on the Oricon Weekly Singles Chart, selling 4,665 copies on its first week. The single charted for four weeks, with reported sales totaling 5,865 copies.

== Track listing ==
Uchū no Kioku - CD single
No.	Title	Writer(s)	Arrangement	Length
1.	"Uchū no Kioku" (宇宙の記憶)	Ringo Sheena	Sheena	3:15
2.	"Jokyoku" (序曲)	Maaya Sakamoto	Ryūji Yamamoto	5:55
3.	"Ashita o Shiranai" (明日を知らない)	The Band Apart	Yamamoto	4:19
4.	"Uchū no Kioku" (Instrumental)			3:15
5.	"Jokyoku" (Instrumental)			5:55
Total length:				26:54

== Personnel ==
Credits adapted from the liner notes of the "Uchū no Kioku" CD single.

- Maaya Sakamoto – vocals, production
- Ringo Sheena – songwriting, arrangements, production
- Tabu Zombie – trumpet
- Josei – acoustic piano
- Akita Goldman – wood bass
- Midorin – drums
- Shacho – agitator
- Takeshi Kurihara – tenor sax
- Uni Inoue – recording & mixing engineering
- Shu Saida – assistant engineer
- Hiroshi Kawasaki – mastering
- Masao Fukuda – A&B direction
- Shirō Sasaki – executive production

== Charts ==
=== Weekly charts ===
Weekly chart performance for "Uchū no Kioku"
Chart (2019)	Peak position
Japan (Oricon)	21
Japan Anime Singles (Oricon)	5
Japan Hot 100 (Billboard Japan)	47
Japan Top Singles Sales (Billboard Japan)	22
Japan Hot Animation (Billboard Japan)	15
Japan Download Songs (Billboard Japan)	35
