= Kyō Dake no Ongaku =

Studio album by Maaya Sakamoto
- Released: November 27, 2019
- Genres: J-pop; pop rock; alternative pop
- Length: 44:20
- Label: FlyingDog
- Producer: Maaya Sakamoto

Maaya Sakamoto chronology
Follow Me Up (2015)	Kyō Dake no Ongaku (2019)	Single Collection+ Achikochi (2020)

Kyō Dake no Ongaku (今日だけの音楽; lit. 'Music Just for Today') is the tenth studio album by Japanese voice actress and singer Maaya Sakamoto, released on November 27, 2019, by FlyingDog.

== Background and release ==
Kyō Dake no Ongaku marks Sakamoto’s tenth studio album and her first in four years, following her 2015 album Follow Me Up. Unlike most of her previous studio works, this album contains no previously released tracks, focusing entirely on new material. This marks her first album consisting entirely of new songs since Shōnen Alice in 2003, making it a significant milestone in her discography, as it became her first entirely-new album in sixteen years.

The album explores the philosophical theme of "music that holds a different meaning when listened to today versus tomorrow." Sakamoto envisioned the album as a cohesive narrative, inspired by a short story she wrote specifically for the project. She described the inspiration in the album’s preface:

This album began with a dream I had one day.

In the dream, I heard music. A voice pouring down like rain. Transparent, yet vividly colorful. Like a soliloquy, but calling out to me. A singular, special music, unique in the world. And yet, when I woke up, I could no longer recall it.

If only I could hear it one more time.

— Maaya Sakamoto, from the preface to Kyō Dake no Ongaku

This story served as a creative brief for the contributing artists, who were asked to compose songs that reflect the concept of fleeting, momentary music. The album’s theme emerged from a staff suggestion, sparking her to write a story that guided the album’s creation, akin to a soundtrack for an imagined film. The album’s concept revolves around a protagonist collecting "music just for today" from various people, culminating in Sakamoto’s own contribution with the title track. This narrative approach, combined with the diverse perspectives of the collaborators, creates a cinematic listening experience designed to evoke different emotions with each listen.

Sakamoto collaborated with a varied lineup of songwriters, composers, and arrangers, including Enon Kawatani of Gesu no Kiwami Otome, Shinichi Osawa of Mondo Grosso, Yasuyuki Horigome of Kirinji, Takeshi Arai of The Band Apart, and Ichiyo Izawa of Tokyo Jihen, among others. Long-time collaborators, such as Yūho Iwasato, Shin Kono, and Zentaro Watanabe, also contributed to the record. Sakamoto herself contributed lyrics to six tracks and composed three, including the opening instrumental "Hajimari" and the title track "Kyō Dake no Ongaku." Production process began during the creation of her single "Uchuu no Kioku," with songwriting commissions starting early to accommodate the album’s conceptual framework. Recording took place primarily in the summer of 2019, with Sakamoto noting the intense but rewarding experience of working with both familiar and new collaborators.

The album was released in two formats: a standard edition and a limited edition including a Blu-ray disc. The Blu-ray disc features a short film with depicts the story that inspired the music.

== Critical reception ==
Writing for Bounce Magazine, music critic Yasuo Murao described the album as a "love letter to the music [Sakamoto] has earnestly pursued," emphasizing its cohesive collection of newly written tracks by diverse songwriters. Murao particularly praised Enon Kawatani's contributions to the album, commenting that "his emotionally raw and vivid lyrics, woven into dynamically unfolding sounds, bring a fresh dimension to Sakamoto’s vocals." Other highlights from the album according to Murao include “Hawking no Sora ni”, where he "[the] meticulously designed soundscape, centered on electronic beats and piano, enhances the delicate allure of Sakamoto’s voice.", and also “O-nozomi Dōri” where, in Murao's view, "[Sakamoto] showcases her technical prowess as a singer, masterfully navigating a fast-paced jazz-based track." The writer also lauded Sakamoto’s versatile vocals, which unified the album’s diverse styles, and highlighted her own compositions, “Hajimari” and the title track “Kyō Dake no Ongaku,” for providing narrative cohesion, positioning the album as both a reflection of her current artistry and a significant step forward in her career.

== Commercial performance ==
Kyō Dake no Ongaku debuted at number 11 on the Oricon Weekly Albums chart, selling 10,977 copies on its first week. Thus, it became Sakamoto's first studio album since 2001's Lucy that fails to enter the Top 10 of the Japanese charts. The album charted for six weeks, with reported sales totaling 14,468 copies.

== Track listing ==
No.	Title	Lyrics	Music	Arrangement	Length
1.	"Hajimari" (はじまり; lit. 'Beginning')		Maaya Sakamoto	Ryūji Yamamoto	2:23
2.	"Hidden Notes"	Sakamoto	Sira	Zentaro Watanabe	4:39
3.	"Hawking no Sora ni" (ホーキングの空に; lit. 'To Hawking's Sky')	Hiroshi Ichikura	Shinichi Osawa	Osawa	4:33
4.	"Yuran Goblet" (ユーランゴブレット)	Enon Kawatani	Kawatani	Kawatani	3:53
5.	"Onozomi Dōri" (お望み通り; lit. 'As You Wish')	Sakamoto	Ichiyo Izawa	Izawa	3:54
6.	"Old-Fashion" (オールドファッション)	Sakamoto	Takeshi Arai	Katsutoshi Kitagawa	4:51
7.	"Kayōbi" (火曜日; lit. 'Tuesday')	Yasuyuki Horigome	Horigome	Shin Kono	4:10
8.	"Traumerei" (トロイメライ)	Sakamoto	Shinobu Watanabe	S. Watanabe	3:18
9.	"Komayaka ni Futa o Shite" (細やかに蓋をして; lit. 'Gently Closing the Lid')	Kawatani	Kawatani	Kawatani	3:46
10.	"Diesel" (ディーゼル)	Yuho Iwasato	Baku Furukawa	Furukawa	3:48
11.	"Kyō Dake no Ongaku" (今日だけの音楽; lit. 'Music Just for Today')	Sakamoto	Sakamoto	Yamamoto	5:05
Total length:					44:20

== Charts ==
Chart performance for Kyō Dake no Ongaku
Chart (2019)	Peak position
Japan (Oricon)	11
Japan Hot Albums (Billboard Japan)	13
