= Hajimari no Umi =

- Limited edition cover

Single by Maaya Sakamoto

from the album Follow Me Up
- Language: Japanese
- B-side: "Itsumo no Tokoro de"
- Released: July 31, 2013
- Studio: Victor Studio
- Genre: J-pop; Anime song
- Length: 3:58
- Label: FlyingDog
- Songwriter: Taeko Onuki
- Producer: Maaya Sakamoto

Maaya Sakamoto singles chronology
| "More Than Words" (2012) | "Hajimari no Umi" (2013) | "Secrear" (2013) |

Music video
- "Hajimari no Umi" on YouTube

"Hajimari no Umi" (はじまりの海; lit. 'Sea of Beginnings') is a song by Japanese singer and voice actress Maaya Sakamoto, released as her twenty-second single on July 31, 2013, by FlyingDog.

== Background and release ==
"Hajimari no Umi" was written and composed by musician Taeko Onuki, and was commissioned to be the opening theme for the television anime Tamayura: More Aggressive. During production, Sakamoto suggested Taeko Onuki's involvement to reflect a nostalgic atmosphere fitting the work's worldview. Initially, Onuki was planned only for composition, but at her own request, she also took on the lyrics. Admittedly not an anime follower, Onuki commented receiving the request for this song, she watched Tamayura and ended up becoming a fan, praising its literary quality. Her concept for the song originated from wondering about how the town of Takehara was like, and the photographs taken by Fū Sawatari, the series protagonist.

The single was released in two formats: a limited first-press edition with a bonus DVD, and the standard CD-only edition.

The b-sides included on the single include "Itsumo no Tokoro," composed and arranged by Katsutoshi Kitagawa (Round Table), and an acoustic version of "Okaerinasai," her 2011 single that served as an insert song for the same anime. As a bonus track, it also includes a live medley from Sakamoto's Live 2013 "Roots of SSW" tour, recorded at the Tokyo Bunkamura Orchard Hall.

== Critical reception ==
Writing for Intoxicate magazine, music writer Wataru Mizukami wrote praised "Hajimari no Umi" for its embodiment of "high-quality, timeless Japanese pop." Mizukami highlighted the exceptional chemistry between Sakamoto and Onuki, noting that their "individual essences blend into a comfortable harmony" far exceeding expectations, with the track's relaxed tempo evoking "serene, sunlit days" that "gently warms the listener's heart." The song was lauded for its "unchanging, standard quality that never fades, no matter the years," positioning it as a modern successor to city pop traditions. The single's overall package was celebrated for its "mini-album-level value," particularly the inclusion of the acoustic version of Matsutoya's previous Tamayura theme song —arranged by Shigeharu Sasago— and the ten-minute live medley, while the '80s aesthetic extending to the jacket art further enhanced its nostalgic appeal.

== Commercial performance ==
"Hajimari no Umi" debuted and peaked at number 19 on the Oricon Weekly Singles Chart, selling 8,651 copies on its first week. The single charted for four weeks, with reported sales totaling 11,161 copies.

== Track listing ==
Hajimari no Umi - CD single
| No. | Title | Lyrics | Music | Arrangement | Length |
|---|---|---|---|---|---|
| 1. | "Hajimari no Umi" (はじまりの海) | Taeko Onuki | Onuki | Toshiyuki Mori | 3:58 |
| 2. | "Itsumo no Tokoro de" (いつものところで) | Maaya Sakamoto | Katsutoshi Kitagawa | Kitagawa | 4:25 |
| 3. | "Okaerinasai" (おかえりなさい) (acoustic ver.) | Yumi Matsutoya | Matsutoya | Shigeharu Sasago | 5:37 |
| 4. | "Medley (Roots of SSW) (Note: Medley of the following songs: "Magic Number", "Platinum", "Kiseki no Umi", "Yubiwa", "Yakusoku wa Iranai", and "Hikari Are".)" | | | Shin Kono | 14:06 |
| Total length: | | | | | 28:06 |

== Personnel ==
Credits adapted from the liner notes of the CD single.

- Maaya Sakamoto – vocals, backing vocals, production
- Taeko Onuki – backing vocals
- Tatsuo Hayashi – drums
- Masato Suzuki – bass
- Hirokazu Ogura – guitar
- Lenny Castro – shaker
- Nobumasa Yamada – recording & mixing engineering
- Fumio Miyata – musician coordinator
- Hiroshi Kawasaki – mastering
- Masao Fukuda – A&R direction
- Hideki Kawaguchi – artist management
- Shirō Sasaki – executive production

== Charts ==
Chart performance for "Hajimari no Umi"
| Chart (2013) | Peak position |
|---|---|
| Japan (Oricon) | 19 |
| Japan Hot 100 (Billboard Japan) | 22 |
| Japan Top Singles Sales (Billboard Japan) | 13 |
| Japan Hot Animation (Billboard Japan) | 7 |
