= Be Mine =

Be Mine may refer to:

== Literature ==
- Be Mine (novel), a 2023 novel by Richard Ford
- Be Mine, a 2007 novel by Laura Kasischke

== Music ==
- Be Mine (EP), by Jonas Brothers, 2009
- "Be Mine" (David Gray song), 2003
- "Be Mine" (Infinite song), 2011
- "Be Mine!" (Maaya Sakamoto song), 2014
- "Be Mine" (Ofenbach song), 2017
- "Be Mine!" (Robyn song), 2005
- "Be Mine", a song by Alabama Shakes from Boys & Girls, 2012
- "Be Mine", a song by Jennifer Lopez from Brave, 2007
- "Be Mine", a song by R.E.M. from New Adventures in Hi-Fi, 1996
- "Be Mine", a song by Wild Orchid from Oxygen, 1998
