= Saved (Maaya Sakamoto song) =

"Saved."

Single by Maaya Sakamoto

from the album Follow Me Up
- Released: February 5, 2014
- Recorded: 2013
- Genre: Pop
- Length: 5:18
- Label: FlyingDog
- Songwriter: Shōko Suzuki
- Producer: Maaya Sakamoto

Maaya Sakamoto singles chronology
"Secrear" (2013)	"Saved." / "Be Mine!" (2014)	"Replica" (2014)

Audio sample
- "Saved.": file; help

"Saved." (stylized as "SAVED.") is a song recorded by Japanese singer Maaya Sakamoto, from the album Follow Me Up. It is the album's third single. It was released by FlyingDog as a double A-side single alongside the song "Be Mine!" on February 5, 2014. The song was written and composed by Shōko Suzuki. It is the ending theme to the anime series Inari, Konkon, Koi Iroha.

== Chart performance ==
"Saved." debuted on the Oricon Singles Chart at number 7, with 15,000 copies sold in first week. The single charted on the chart for eleven weeks, selling a reported total of 25,000 copies sold.

== Track listing ==
No.	Title	Writer(s)	Arranger(s)	Length
1.	"Saved."	Shōko Suzuki	Ryūji Yamamoto	5:18
2.	"Be Mine!"	Maaya Sakamoto; The Band Apart	The Band Apart; Ryō Eguchi; Tōru Ishitsuka	4:01
3.	"Koe" (声, "Voice")	Sakamoto; Solaya	Solaya	4:41
4.	"Saved." (Instrumental)	Suzuki	Yamamoto	5:18
5.	"Be Mine!" (Instrumental)	The Band Apart	The Band Apart; Eguchi; Ishitsuka	4:01
6.	"Koe" (Instrumental)	Solaya	Solaya	4:37
Total length:				27:57

Limited Edition Mini Live Album: Roots of SSW
No.	Title	Writer(s)	Arranger(s)	Length
1.	"Tooku" (遠く, "Far Away")	Sakamoto	Shin Kono	5:27
2.	"Grapefruit" (グレープフルーツ, Gurēpufurūtsu)	Yuho Iwasato; Yoko Kanno	Kono	4:52
3.	"Cloud 9"	Iwasato; Kanno	Kono	5:13
4.	"Park Amsterdam (The Whole Story)"	Troy; Kanno	Kono	4:22
5.	"Scrap (Wakare no Uta)" (スクラップ～別れの詩, Sukurappu Wakare no Uta, "Scrap (Parting Song)")	Iwasato; Kanno	Kono	5:03
6.	"Singer-songwriter" (シンガーソングライター, Shingā Songuraitā)	Sakamoto	Kono	6:44
Total length:				31:44

== Credits and personnel ==
Personnel

- Vocals, backing vocals – Maaya Sakamoto
- Songwriting – Shōko Suzuki
- Arrangement, acoustic piano, hammond organ, celesta, tambourine, programming – Ryūji Yamamoto
- Bass – Yūji Okiyama
- Drums – Hiroshi Yabe
- Guitar – Hiroomi Shitara
- Strings – Yu Manabe Strings
- Engineering, mixing – Shojiro Watanabe
- Mastering – Hiroshi Kawasaki

== Charts ==
Chart (2014)	Peak position	Sales
Japan Daily Singles (Oricon)	4	25,000
Japan Weekly Singles (Oricon)	7	25,000
Japan Hot 100 (Billboard)	18	25,000
Japan Hot Animation (Billboard)	3	25,000
Japan Hot Singles Sales (Billboard)	5	25,000
