= Gyakkō =

- Maaya edition cover

Single by Maaya Sakamoto

from the album Single Collection+ Achikochi
- Language: Japanese
- B-side: "Kūhaku"
- Released: July 25, 2018
- Studio: Victor Studio
- Genre: J-pop; Anime song
- Length: 4:49
- Label: FlyingDog
- Composer: Ichiyo Izawa
- Lyricist: Maaya Sakamoto
- Producer: Maaya Sakamoto

Maaya Sakamoto singles chronology
"Hello, Hello" (2018)	"Gyakkō" (2018)	"Uchū no Kioku" (2019)

Alternative cover
- FGO edition cover

Music video
- "Gyakkō" on YouTube

"Gyakkō" (逆光; lit. 'Backlight') is a song by Japanese singer and voice actress Maaya Sakamoto, released as her twenty-ninth single on July 25, 2018, by FlyingDog. Co-written by Sakamoto and Ichiyo Izawa, the song served as the theme song for the second part of the game smartphone game Fate/Grand Order, Cosmos in the Lostbelt.

== Background and release ==
The smartphone game Fate/Grand Order (FGO), developed by Type-Moon, has achieved significant success with approximately 13 million downloads in Japan. Maaya Sakamoto's involvement with the Fate/Grand Order franchise began in 2013, two years before the game’s 2015 launch, when she was commissioned by Type-Moon’s scenario writer Kinoko Nasu and illustrator Takashi Takeuchi to create the theme song “Shikisai” for the game’s first installment. Sakamoto also voiced several characters in the game, including Jeanne d’Arc. “Shikisai”, the first song Sakamoto contributed to the series, was released in 2015 as part of the double A-single along with "Shiawase ni Tsuite Watashi ga Shitteiru Itsutsu no Hōhō" and, according to Sakamoto, eventually became one of her signature songs, and a significant factor in attracting new fans to her music.

For "Gyakkō," Kinoko Nasu met with Sakamoto during the narrative peak of the first part of the Fate/Grand Order storyline, to discuss the second part’s themes, aiming to create a song that contrasted with “Shikisai” while avoiding spoilers. Sakamoto noted the challenge of writing lyrics for a story that followed the first part’s conclusion, ultimately crafting a song with a darker tone to reflect the second part’s narrative shift. In addition to the title track, Nasu and Takeuchi requested Maaya to provide an extra song for the Fate/Grand Order arcade game. Nasu provided a written brief outlining this concept, a departure from the oral and whiteboard-based discussions for prior songs. Sakamoto interpreted "Kūhaku" as revisiting the perspective of Mash, the game’s heroine. Sakamoto commented on the creative process: "a few players might listen closely to a theme song during arcade play, but FGO fans will likely reflect on the world through the song, so I didn’t want to betray their expectations." The song created was eventually titled "Kūhaku," maintaining the two-kanji convention of "Shikisai" and "Gyakkō," originated from Nasu’s casual mention of “overcoming a blank” during discussions, which Sakamoto adopted to shape the song’s theme of rewriting endings for those who have faced loss. "Kūhaku" was composed, arranged, and performed by La La Larks, the same group behind "Shikisai."

"Gyakkō" was first revealed on commercials for the Fate/Grand Order game, and was premiered as the theme song for the second part of the Fate/Grand Order game, Cosmos in the Lostbelt, at the Fate Project New Year’s Eve TV Special 2017 (Fate Project 大晦日TVスペシャル2017).

On January 31, 2018, the full version of "Gyakkō" had an early streaming release exclusively on the AniUta app, ahead of the single’s physical release.

The physical single was released on July 25, 2018, in two formats, labeled as "Maaya edition" and "FGO edition", with the latter featuring an artwork drawn by Takashi Takeuchi.

The single also includes an unplugged version of "Shikisai," which was recorded live in a studio session.

== Composition and themes ==
The track was written by Maaya Sakamoto and composed and arranged by Ichiyo Izawa (Tokyo Jihen and The Hiatus), with additional string arrangements by Ryo Eguchi and Toru Ishitsuka. The lyrics were crafted after extensive discussions with the game's production team to align with its narrative. Sakamoto described the song’s lyrics as exploring a darker tone compared to “Shikisai,” depicting a person struggling through adversity, with imagery of running through rain and mud, reflecting a sense of resilience. Kinoko Nasu further explained that the song is about "one's own efforts that are only understood by yourself," commenting: "Someone struggling in a storm is invisible to others on the shore [...] it is a song for everyone striving alone, whether their effort is recognized or not. You just keep pushing toward the other side of the storm." Nasu further revealed that the song's hidden theme is “revenge,” explaining it by phrasing: "You’re in the mud now, but just wait—you’ll rise and run." “Kūhaku,” on the other hand, was inspired by the concept of underlying ethos of Fate/Grand Order, described by Nasu as a reflection of human perseverance. Sakamoto noted that “Kūhaku” revisits the perspective of the game’s character Mash, focusing on moving forward despite significant losses.

== Critical reception ==
A CDJournal review praised Ichiyo Izawa's arrangement due to its complex structure with repeated key changes, further commenting: "the intro evokes a sense of unease, but the bright melody of the chorus feels like it dispels darkness or clouds."

== Commercial performance ==
"Gyakkō" debuted at number 4 on the Oricon Weekly Singles chart, selling 20,304 on its first week. This marked Sakamoto's first Oricon Top 5 entry since her 2010 single "Down Town / Yasashisa ni Tsutsumareta Nara", and it also became her second highest-charting single after "Triangler". The single ended up charting for 14 weeks, selling 30,000 copies in total.

On the Billboard Japan charts, "Gyakkō" debuted at number 4 on the Hot 100, while also topping the Hot Animation chart.

In March 2019, the song was certified gold by the Recording Industry Association of Japan.

== Track listing ==
All lyrics are written by Maaya Sakamoto.

Gyakkō - CD single
No.	Title	Music	Arrangement	Length
1.	"Gyakkō" (逆光)	Ichiyo Izawa	Izawa; Ryo Eguchi	4:49
2.	"Kūhaku" (空白)	La La Larks	La La Larks	5:03
3.	"Shikisai" (色彩) (unplugged session)	La La Larks	Kento Ohgiya	5:43
4.	"Gyakkō" (Instrumental)			4:49
5.	"Kūhaku" (Instrumental)			4:59
Total length:				25:23

== Personnel ==
Credits adapted from the liner notes of the "Gyakkō" CD single.

- Maaya Sakamoto – songwriting, vocals, backing vocals, production
- Ichiyo Izawa – songwriting, acoustic piano, programming, arrangements, strings arrangements
- Ryō Eguchi – arrangements, strings arrangements
- Toru Ishitsuka – strings arrangements
- Osamu Hidai – drums
- Yu Suto – bass
- Hiroomi Shitara – guitar
- Tomomi Tokunaga Strings – strings
- Hiromitsu Takasu – recording & mixing engineering
- Toshiyuki Kawahito – assistant engineer
- Hiroshi Kawasaki – mastering
- Masao Fukuda – A&R direction
- Hideki Kawaguchi – artist management
- Shirō Sasaki – executive production

== Charts ==
=== Weekly charts ===
Weekly chart performance for "Gyakkō"
Chart (2018)	Peak position
Japan (Oricon)	7
Japan Hot 100 (Billboard Japan)	4
Japan Hot Animation (Billboard Japan)	1
Japan Download Songs (Billboard Japan)	2

=== Monthly charts ===
Monthly chart performance for "Gyakkō"
Chart (2018)	Position
Japan (Oricon)	20
Japan Anime Singles (Oricon)	8

== Certifications ==
Region	Certification	Certified units/sales
Japan (RIAJ) Digital	Gold	100,000^{*}
^{*} Sales figures based on certification alone.
