= Be Mine! (Maaya Sakamoto song) =

Single by Maaya Sakamoto

from the album Follow Me Up
- Released: February 5, 2014
- Genre: Pop
- Length: 4:01
- Label: FlyingDog
- Songwriters: Maaya Sakamoto; The Band Apart
- Producer: Maaya Sakamoto

Maaya Sakamoto singles chronology
"Secrear" (2013)	"Be Mine!" / "Saved." (2014)	"Replica" (2014)

Audio sample
- file; help

Music video
- "Be Mine!" on YouTube

"Be Mine!" (stylized as "Be mine!") is a song recorded by Japanese singer Maaya Sakamoto, from the album Follow Me Up. It is the album's fourth single. It was released by FlyingDog as a double A-side single alongside the song "Saved." on February 5, 2014. The song was written by Sakamoto and composed by The Band Apart. It is the opening theme to the anime series World Conquest Zvezda Plot, for which Sakamoto voices the character of Kaori Hayabusa.

== Chart performance ==
"Be Mine!" debuted on the Oricon Singles Chart at number 7, with 15,000 copies sold in first week. The single charted on the chart for eleven weeks, selling a reported total of 25,000 copies sold.

== Track listing ==
No.	Title	Writer(s)	Arranger(s)	Length
1.	"Be Mine!"	Maaya Sakamoto; The Band Apart	The Band Apart; Ryō Eguchi; Tōru Ishitsuka	4:01
2.	"Saved."	Shōko Suzuki	Ryūji Yamamoto	5:18
3.	"Koe" (声, "Voice")	Sakamoto; Solaya	Solaya	4:41
4.	"Be Mine!" (Instrumental)	The Band Apart	The Band Apart; Eguchi; Ishitsuka	4:01
5.	"Saved." (Instrumental)	Suzuki	Yamamoto	5:18
6.	"Koe" (Instrumental)	Solaya	Solaya	4:37
Total length:				27:57

Limited Edition Mini Live Album: Roots of SSW
No.	Title	Writer(s)	Arranger(s)	Length
1.	"Tooku" (遠く, "Far Away")	Sakamoto	Shin Kōno	5:27
2.	"Grapefruit" (グレープフルーツ, Gurēpufurūtsu)	Yuho Iwasato; Yoko Kanno	Kōno	4:52
3.	"Cloud 9"	Iwasato; Kanno	Kōno	5:13
4.	"Park Amsterdam (The Whole Story)"	Troy; Kanno	Kōno	4:22
5.	"Scrap (Wakare no Uta)" (スクラップ～別れの詩, Sukurappu Wakare no Uta, "Scrap (Parting Song)")	Iwasato; Kanno	Kōno	5:03
6.	"Singer-songwriter" (シンガーソングライター, Shingā Songuraitā)	Sakamoto	Kōno	6:44
Total length:				31:44

== Credits and personnel ==
Personnel

- Vocals, backing vocals – Maaya Sakamoto
- Songwriting – Maaya Sakamoto, The Band Apart
- Arrangement – The Band Apart, Ryō Eguchi, Tōru Ishitsuka
- Bass – Masakazu Hara
- Drums – Eiichi Kogure
- Guitar – Takeshi Arai, Kōichi Kawasaki
- Tambourine – Hiroyuki Watabe
- Electronic keyboard, programming – Ryō Eguchi
- Strings – Tomomi Tokunaga Strings
- Engineering – Naoki Hayami, Hiromitsu Takasu
- Mixing – Takayoshi Yamanouchi
- Mastering – Hiroshi Kawasaki

== Charts ==
Chart (2014)	Peak position	Sales
Japan Daily Singles (Oricon)	4	25,000
Japan Weekly Singles (Oricon)	7	25,000
Japan Hot 100 (Billboard)	22	25,000
Japan Hot Animation (Billboard)	5	25,000
Japan Hot Singles Sales (Billboard)	5	25,000
