= Kore Kara =

Single by Maaya Sakamoto

from the album Follow Me Up
- Released: April 1, 2015
- Genre: Pop
- Length: 5:13
- Label: FlyingDog
- Songwriter: Maaya Sakamoto
- Producer: Maaya Sakamoto

Maaya Sakamoto singles chronology
"Shiawase ni Tsuite Watashi ga Shitte Iru Itsutsu no Hōhō" / "Shikisai" (2015)	"Kore Kara" (2015)	"Anata o Tamotsu Mono" / "Mada Ugoku" (2015)

Audio sample
- "Kore Kara": file; help

"Kore Kara" (これから; lit. "From now on") is a song recorded by Japanese singer Maaya Sakamoto, from the album Follow Me Up. It was released by FlyingDog as the album's sixth and final single exclusively on digital platforms on April 1, 2015. The song was written and composed by Sakamoto and arranged by Shin Kono. It is the theme song to the four-part animated film series Tamayura: Sotsugyō Shashin.

== Composition ==
"Kore Kara" was composed in the key of C-sharp major and set to a tempo of 74 beats per minute, while Sakamoto's vocals span from G♯_{3} to C♯_{5}. Lyrically, the song deals with the theme of graduation. Sakamoto wrote "Kore Kara" specifically for Tamayura: Sotsugyō Shashin, the last chapter in the Tamayura series, one she has been involved with since its beginning in 2010 and for which she has performed several opening themes, including "Yasashisa o Tsutsumareta Nara", "Okaerinasai" and "Hajimari no Umi". In an interview with the music website Natalie, she revealed that she wrote the song with in mind the dream of one day performing it on stage at the Saitama Super Arena, which Sakamoto realized in 2015 while touring to celebrate her 20th anniversary.

== Charts ==
Chart (2015)	Peak position
Japan Hot Animation (Billboard)	20
