= Clear (Maaya Sakamoto song) =

Japanese song by Maaya Sakamoto

Single by Maaya Sakamoto

from the album Single Collection+ Achikochi
- Released: January 31, 2018
- Recorded: 2017
- Studio: Victor Studio
- Genre: Pop
- Length: 4:15
- Label: FlyingDog
- Songwriters: Maaya Sakamoto; Yoshiki Mizuno
- Producer: Maaya Sakamoto

Maaya Sakamoto singles chronology
"Million Clouds" (2016)	"Clear" (2018)	"Hello, Hello" (2018)

Audio sample
- file; help

Music video
- "Clear" on YouTube

"Clear" (stylized as "CLEAR") is a song recorded by Japanese singer Maaya Sakamoto. It was released as a single on January 31, 2018, through FlyingDog. It was written by Sakamoto and composed by Yoshiki Mizuno of the band Ikimono-gakari. "Clear" is the opening theme to the NHK anime Cardcaptor Sakura: Clear Card, the sequel to Cardcaptor Sakura, for which Sakamoto's "Platinum" served as opening theme for the third season close to twenty years prior. An acoustic take of "Platinum" performed on June 4, 2017 at the Itsukushima Shrine in Hiroshima is included as a coupling track on the single.

== Chart performance ==
The single entered the daily Oricon Singles Chart at number 9 on January 30, 2018. It debuted at number 13 on the weekly Oricon Singles Chart, with 9,000 copies sold. "Clear" also charted on several Billboard Japan charts: at number 8 on the Hot 100, at number 2 on Hot Animation, number 4 on Download Songs and at number 12 on Top Singles Sales. The single also charted on the Oricon Digital Singles Chart, ranking at number 4 and selling a reported 18,000 downloads on its first week.

== Track listing ==
No.	Title	Writer(s)	Arranger(s)	Length
1.	"Clear"	Maaya Sakamoto; Yoshiki Mizuno	Shin Kono	4:15
2.	"Record" (レコード, Rekōdo)	Sakamoto; Kohei Dojima	Hiroyasu Yano	4:43
3.	"Platinum" (Acoustic Live Version)	Yuho Iwasato; Yoko Kanno	Kōno	4:21
4.	"Clear" (Instrumental)	Mizuno	Kōno	4:15
5.	"Record" (Instrumental)	Dōjima	Yano	4:37
Total length:				22:13

== Credits and personnel ==
Personnel

- Vocals, backing vocals, production – Maaya Sakamoto
- Songwriting – Maaya Sakamoto, Yoshiki Mizuno
- Arrangement, piano, programming, electronic keyboard – Shin Kōno
- Drums – Yasuo Sano
- Bass – Takeshi Taneda
- Guitar – Tsuneo Imahori
- Strings – Chieko Kinbara Strings
- Mixing – Toshihiko Miyoshi
- Engineering – Hiroaki Yamazaki
- Mastering – Hiroshi Kawasaki

== Charts ==
Chart (2018)	Peak position
Japan Daily Singles (Oricon)	9
Japan Weekly Singles (Oricon)	13
Japan Weekly Digital Singles (Oricon)	4
Japan Hot 100 (Billboard)	8
Japan Hot Animation (Billboard)	2
Japan Download Songs (Billboard)	4
Japan Top Singles Sales (Billboard)	12
Japan Weekly Singles (Mora) (AAC)	4
Japan Weekly Singles (Mora) (FLAC)	18
Japan Weekly Albums (Mora) (AAC)	3
Japan Weekly Albums (Mora) (FLAC)	1
Japan Weekly Singles (Recochoku) (AAC)	8
Japan Weekly Singles (Recochoku) (FLAC)	1
Japan Weekly Albums (Recochoku) (AAC)	21
Japan Weekly Albums (Recochoku) (FLAC)	2

== Sales ==
Region	Certification	Certified units/sales
Japan	—	15,429
Japan Digital	—	25,334
