= Dive (Maaya Sakamoto album) =

Studio album by Maaya Sakamoto
- Released: December 19, 1998
- Studio: Livingston Recording Studios; Metropolis Studios; Z'd Studio; Vincent Studio; Sunrise Studio; Sound Inn Studio; Victor Studio; Soundcity Studio
- Genre: J-pop; pop rock; alternative pop
- Length: 52:12
- Language: Japanese
- Label: Victor Entertainment
- Producer: Yoko Kanno

Maaya Sakamoto chronology
Grapefruit (1997)	Dive (1998)	Single Collection+ Hotchpotch (1999)

Singles from Dive
- 1. "Hashiru" Released: November 21, 1998

Dive (stylized in all caps) is the second studio album by Japanese voice actress and singer Maaya Sakamoto, released on December 19, 1998, by Victor Entertainment.

== Background and release ==
Sakamoto commented that she experienced identity conflicts during the period around her debut and the release of her debut album Grapefruit. She was 17 and 18 at the time and, despite enjoying a typical high school life and successful work, she felt a gap between her self-perception and public image. She commented that this stemmed from her growing public exposure: releasing records under her own name led to receiving an increasing number of fan letters, which was initially exciting but eventually gave rise to a fear that others forming fixed images of who 'Maaya Sakamoto' was before she understood herself, prompting a focus on authenticity through her own words rather than just music. On the other hand, she was often treated her as a child by parents, friends, or staff, which led to inner discord and a fear of lacking originality, manifesting in multiple "sides" of herself depending on the context. She prioritized external praise—behaving as an ideal student, daughter, performer, and fan favorite—before clarifying personal desires. The question of what she wanted to do emerged as a recurring, enduring theme, and these internal struggles are what eventually formed the concept of Dive.

The album was fully produced by Yoko Kanno and recorded in the United Kingdom and Tokyo, with mastering completed in New York. Production spanned six months. During production, the melodies composed by Kanno were divided between Sakamoto and Yuho Iwasato for lyric writing. Sakamoto first contributed lyrics on her debut album Grapefruit, which remained largely untouched by external input. With Dive, however, she began receiving more feedback on her lyric writing, marking what she described as an "awakening" as an artist. She commented: "[On Dive] I wanted people to see a version of me that was at least a little closer to the real thing. I began placing more weight on “communicating in my own words” than on the music itself." Sakamoto maintained a notebook of thoughts and lyric snippets, which she shared with producer Yoko Kanno, lyricist Yuho Iwasato, and her director to shape the album's direction. The process reflected her desire to incorporate personal ideas into lyrics and the overall framework. "Pilot" was the first track Sakamoto wrote lyrics for on the album and her personal favorite among the melodies assigned to her. The song was also Iwasato's first major impression of Sakamoto's lyric-writing ability. Sakamoto ended up writing the lyrics for over half the tracks on the album.

Sakamoto had no input on the sound during production but was consulted on every detail, from mixes to instrument choices, despite initially struggling to discern differences. According to her, this hands-on involvement built her future skills as an artist.

In retrospective, Sakamoto described the album as the point where she finally began digging deeper into herself and contemplating what she really wanted to express, commenting "it captures the hazy, clouded emotions of that time—a teenager's inexplicable gloom" from when she was 17 and 18 years old.

== Critical reception ==
Writing for Mikiki by Tower Records, music writer Hajime Kitano praised Dive by commenting "As conveyed by the unified black and white artwork, the colorful vibrancy of the previous work [Grapefruit] has receded, giving way to a rough-textured band sound paired with a dignified vocal delivery and introspective lyrics, resulting in a masterpiece imbued with a mysterious transparency." Highlighting the international production of the album, CD Journal praised Sakamoto's signature "uncommon love songs," adding that her voice "may seem fragile at first glance, but in truth carries a resolute strength" and "breathes life into a soundscape where despair and hope intersect."

== Commercial performance ==
Dive debuted at number 44 on the Oricon Weekly Albums chart, selling 7,010 copies on its first week. The album charted for three weeks, with reported sales totaling 13,400 copies.

== Track listing ==
All music is composed by Yoko Kanno.

Dive track listing
No.	Title	Lyrics	Length
1.	"I.D."	Maaya Sakamoto	4:41
2.	"Hashiru" (走る, lit. 'Run') (Album ver.)	Yuho Iwasato	5:34
3.	"Baby Face"	Tim Jensen	4:40
4.	"Getsuyō no Asa" (月曜の朝, lit. 'Monday Morning')	Iwasato	4:07
5.	"Pilot" (パイロット)	Sakamoto	3:56
6.	"Heavenly Blue"	Sakamoto; Jensen	4:49
7.	"Peace" (ピース)	Sakamoto	4:51
8.	"Yucca" (ユッカ)	Iwasato	4:54
9.	"Neko to Inu" (ねこといぬ, lit. 'Cat and Dog')	Sakamoto	4:04
10.	"Kodoku" (孤独, lit. 'Loneliness')	Iwasato	4:58
11.	"Dive"	Iwasato	5:26
Total length:			52:05

== Personnel ==
Credits adapted from the liner notes of Dive.

- Maaya Sakamoto – vocals, backing vocals
- Yoko Kanno – songwriting, arrangements, acoustic piano, keyboards, sound production
- Yuho Iwasato – lyrics concept coordinator
- Gabriela Robin – backing vocals (2)
- Junko Hirotani – backing vocals (3, 6)
- Kiyoshi Hiyama – backing vocals (3, 6)
- Yasuhiro Kido – backing vocals (3, 6)
- Neal Wilkinson – drums (1, 2, 3, 5, 10, 11)
- Andy Pask – bass (1, 2, 3, 5, 9, 10, 11)
- Huge Burns – guitar (1, 2, 3, 5, 10, 11)
- Keishi Urata – sound architect
- Gavyn Wright – strings orchestra leader (1, 2, 5, 9, 11)
- Isobel Griffiths – strings contractor (1, 2, 5, 9, 11)
- Yoichi Okabe – percussion (1, 2, 3, 7)
- Tsuneo Imahori – guitar (4, 7, 8)
- Yasuo Sano – drums (7, 8)
- Hitoshi Watanabe – A. bass (7), E. bass (8)
- Toshio Araki – trumpet (6, 7)
- Yoichi Murata – trombone (6, 7)
- Takuo Yamamoto – A. sax (6, 7)
- Masatsugu Shinozaki Group – strings (8)
- Anthony Pleeth – cello (10)
- Toshiaki Ota – recording coordinator
- Saeko Nishimura – artist management
- Masashi Yabuhara – recording, mixing
- Steve Orchard – assistant engineer
- Simon Burwell – assistant engineer
- Adrian Hall – assistant engineer
- Yoshitaka Suzuki – assistant engineer
- Tsukasa Matsunaga – assistant engineer
- Naoshi Fujita – assistant engineer
- Takahiro Suzuki – assistant engineer
- Tsuyoshi Kaizawa – assistant engineer
- Seiji Sekine – assistant engineer
- Hiroshi Tokunaga – assistant engineer
- Yasuhiro Tsurusaki – assistant engineer
- Elle Kawano – recording coordinator
- Ted Jensen – mastering
- Shirō Sasaki – co-producer
- Yukako Inoue – director

== Charts ==
Chart performance for Dive
Chart (1998)	Peak position
Japanese Albums (Oricon)	44
