= Million Clouds =

Single by Maaya Sakamoto
- Released: July 27, 2016
- Genre: Pop
- Length: 4:58
- Label: FlyingDog
- Songwriters: Maaya Sakamoto; Frida Sundemo
- Producer: Maaya Sakamoto

Maaya Sakamoto singles chronology
"Anata o Tamotsu Mono" / "Mada Ugoku" (2015)	"Million Clouds" (2016)	"Clear" (2018)

Audio sample
- "Million Clouds": file; help

Music video
- "Million Clouds" on YouTube

"Million Clouds" is a song recorded by Japanese singer Maaya Sakamoto. It was released as a single on July 27, 2016, through FlyingDog. It was written by Sakamoto and composed by Swedish singer-songwriter Frida Sundemo. The song served as the opening theme to the Tokyo MX anime Amanchu!.

== Chart performance ==
The single debuted at number 24 on the Oricon Singles Chart, with 8,000 copies on its first week. It went on to chart for six weeks, selling a reported total of 11,000 copies.

== Track listing ==
No.	Title	Writer(s)	Arranger(s)	Length
1.	"Million Clouds"	Maaya Sakamoto; Frida Sundemo	Shin Kono	4:15
2.	"Ромашка" (ロマーシカ, Romāshika, "Chamomile")	Sakamoto	Kono	4:33
3.	"Dive" (featuring Gontiti)	Yuho Iwasato; Yoko Kanno	Gontiti	4:59
4.	"Million Clouds" (Piano Version)	Sundemo	Kono	3:20
5.	"Hajimari no Umi" (Live Version)	Taeko Onuki	Kono	4:05
Total length:				21:57

== Credits and personnel ==
Personnel

- Vocals, backing vocals, production – Maaya Sakamoto
- Songwriting – Maaya Sakamoto, Frida Sundemo
- Arrangement, piano, programming, electronic keyboard – Shin Kōno
- Guitar – Tsuneo Imahori
- Percussion – Izumi Misawa
- Strings – Chieko Kinbara Strings
- Mixing – Toshihiko Miyoshi
- Engineering – Hiroaki Yamazaki
- Mastering – Hiroshi Kawasaki

== Charts ==
Chart (2016)	Peak position	Sales
Japan Daily Singles (Oricon)	14	11,000
Japan Weekly Singles (Oricon)	24	11,000
Japan Hot 100 (Billboard)	35	11,000
Japan Hot Animation (Billboard)	12	11,000
Japan Top Singles Sales (Billboard)	26	11,000
