= Secrear =

Single by Maaya Sakamoto
- Released: October 30, 2013
- Genre: Pop
- Length: 4:37
- Label: FlyingDog
- Songwriters: Natsumi; Solaya
- Producer: Maaya Sakamoto

Maaya Sakamoto singles chronology
"Hajimari no Umi" (2013)	"Secrear" (2013)	"Saved." / "Be Mine!" (2014)

Audio sample
- "Secrear": file; help

"Secrear" (セクレアール, Sekureāru) is a song recorded by Japanese singer Maaya Sakamoto. It was released by FlyingDog as an exclusively digital single on October 30, 2013. The song was written by Natsumi and composed and arranged by Solaya. It is the theme song to the Monster Hunter Frontier G, on which it is performed in-game by the character of Diva.

== Composition ==
The song is sung in an original constructed language featured in the game Monster Hunter Frontier G. A Japanese-language version of the song, re-named "Koe" (声; "Voice") and featuring lyrics reinterpreted by Sakamoto herself, was recorded in 2014 and included as a B-side to the double A-side single "Saved." / "Be Mine!".

== Credits and personnel ==
Personnel

- Vocals, backing vocals – Maaya Sakamoto
- Songwriting – Natsumi, Solaya
- Arrangement, programming – Solaya
- Morin khuur – Bo Li (Chinese: 李波)
- Percussion – Matarō Misawa
- Piccolo, flute – Hideyo Takakuwa
- Clarinet – Kimio Yamane
- Harp – Tomoyuki Asakawa
- Strings – Gen Ittetsu Strings
- mixing – Miyoshi Toshihiko
- Engineering – Akitomo Takakuwa, Hiroaki Yamazaki
- Mastering – Hiroshi Kawasaki
