= Gift (Maaya Sakamoto song) =

- 8-cm CD single cover

Single by Maaya Sakamoto

from the album Single Collection+ Hotchpotch
- Language: Japanese
- B-side: "Kimi ni Ai ni Ikō"
- Released: September 22, 1997
- Genre: J-pop; anime song
- Length: 5:48
- Label: Victor Entertainment
- Composer: Yoko Kanno
- Lyricist: Yuho Iwasato
- Producer: Yoko Kanno

Maaya Sakamoto singles chronology
"Yakusoku wa Iranai" (1996)	"Gift" (1997)	"Kiseki no Umi" (1997)

"Gift" is a song by Japanese voice actress and singer Maaya Sakamoto, released as her second single on September 22, 1997, through Victor Entertainment. Co-written by Yuho Iwasato and Yoko Kanno, the song served as ending theme for the television anime series Clamp School Detectives.

== Background ==
"Gift" was used as the second ending theme on the 1997 anime Clamp School Detectives, and is Sakamoto's second song contributed to this series after "Bokura no Rekishi," which was used as theme song for the Clamp School Detectives radio drama. The song was also used as ending theme for Sakamoto's radio program Sakamoto Maaya I.D., which aired on Nack5.

The song was first included on the album Clamp School Detectives Original Soundtrack 2, released on October 22, 1997. Both "Gift" and its b-side, "Kimi ni Ai ni Ikō," were included on Sakamoto's compilation album Single Collection+ Hotchpotch, released on December 16, 1999.

Sakamoto's fifteenth anniversary concert, held at the Nippon Budokan held in 2010, was titled after "Gift", and the song was performed as the opening track. During the concert, Sakamoto herself appeared in a costume designed to represent herself as a gift, featuring a skirt composed of ribbon-wrapped gift boxes and a bow on the back.

"Gift" was also included on Sakamoto's 2010 greatest hits album Everywhere. Commenting about it, Sakamoto noted that despite having recorded the song many years earlier, it did not feel dated to her. She explained that it had hearing the track evoked memories of her long-running radio show Sakamoto Maaya I.D., for which she had great affection.

== Commercial performance ==
"Gift" did not enter the Oricon Singles Chart, and to date it is the only original physical single in Sakamoto's discography to have failed to chart.

== Track listing ==
All lyrics are written by Yuho Iwasato; all music is composed by Yoko Kanno.

Gift - 8-cm CD single
No.	Title	Length
1.	"Gift"	5:48
2.	"Kimi ni Ai ni Ikō" (君に会いにいこう)	5:14
3.	"Gift" (Original Karaoke)	5:48
4.	"Kimi ni Ai ni Ikō" (Original Karaoke)	5:14
Total length:		22:04
