= Arte (manga) =

Japanese manga and anime series

- First tankōbon volume cover, featuring Arte

アルテ (Arute)
- Manga
- Written by: Kei Ohkubo
- Published by: Tokuma Shoten
- English publisher: Media Do (former); Comikey (current)
- Magazine: Monthly Comic Zenon
- Original run: October 25, 2013 – present
- Volumes: 22
- Anime television series
- Directed by: Takayuki Hamana
- Written by: Reiko Yoshida
- Music by: Gorō Itō
- Studio: Seven Arcs
- Licensed by: Crunchyroll (Note: In North America through Crunchyroll, LLC (formerly known as Funimation).); SEA: Muse Communication
- Original network: Tokyo MX, BS Fuji, ytv
- Original run: April 4, 2020 – June 20, 2020
- Episodes: 12

Arte (Japanese: アルテ, Hepburn: Arute) is a Japanese manga series by Kei Ohkubo. It was serialized in Tokuma Shoten's seinen manga magazine Monthly Comic Zenon from October 2013 to April 2025. It was collected in twenty-two tankōbon volumes. The manga is licensed in North America by Comikey. An anime television series adaptation by Seven Arcs aired from April to June 2020.

== Plot ==
In early 16th-century Florence, Italy, Arte is the only daughter of the noble but decadent Spalletti household. Since her childhood, Arte has proved herself as having an unusual talent for painting, but when her father dies, her mother tries to force her to abandon her love for art and find a young nobleman to marry as soon as possible in order to save the Spallettis from ruin.

Arte, however, refuses to give up her dreams, and, going against the beliefs of her time, she starts searching for a master painter to work for, hoping to one day become a master painter herself.

Her strong determination ultimately catches the attention of the young but well-known painter Leo, who finally accepts her as his apprentice. Unfortunately, as time goes on, Arte finds herself falling in love with her mentor, and is forced to make her choice between her personal artistic dream and realistic love.

== Characters ==
Arte Spalletti (アルテ・スパレッティ, Arute Suparetti)
Voiced by: Mikako Komatsu (Japanese); Felecia Angelle (English)
The heiress of the noble Spalletti household of Florence. Since childhood, she had a deep love and talent for painting. To allow his daughter to satisfy her passion, her father provided her with the best teachers, but after his death, her mother forces her to give up her dream of becoming a master painter and get married as soon as possible to save their penniless family. Determined to protect her dreams at all costs, Arte ultimately leaves her house and her noble status behind and goes in search of a master to become an apprentice of, defying all the moral codes of her time.
Leo (レオ, Reo)
Voiced by: Katsuyuki Konishi (Japanese); Gianni Matragrano (English)
A young painter with an unhappy childhood and a past as a beggar, he accepts after many hesitations to take Arte as his apprentice, above all because in her he sees himself when he had decided to pursue his vocation at the expense of his humble origins.
Angelo Parker (アンジェロ・パーカー, Anjero Pākā)
Voiced by: Junya Enoki (Japanese); Wayne Grayson (English)
A young sculptor apprentice, he comes from a relatively wealthy family but was forced to work to help his father, magistrate of the Lordship, put aside the money necessary to pay the dowry of his five sisters. He falls in love with Arte at first sight.
Veronica (ヴェロニカ, Veronika)
Voiced by: Sayaka Ohara (Japanese); Erica Schroeder (English)
Rich, beautiful and a pragmatic courtesan, she is the most desired woman in Florence, with an endless crowd of admirers and clients. She takes a liking to Arte from their first meeting, to the point of commissioning her portrait, which then becomes the debut work of the young painter.
Yuri Falier (ユーリ, Yūri)
Voiced by: Kohsuke Toriumi (Japanese); Doug Erholtz (English)
Venetian nobleman and skilled merchant from the noble house Falier (ファリエル), he accidentally gets to know Arte after visiting Veronica during a visit to Florence. Bewitched by the talent and decisive character of Arte, he proposes that she go to Venice to become both the family painter and the tutor of his niece.
Katarina (カタリーナ, Katarīna)
Voiced by: M.A.O (Japanese); Michelle Marie (English)
The eldest daughter of Malta and Sofia dei Falier (ソフィア), a family of noble merchants and among the oldest in Venice. Arte is summoned to Venice to be her etiquette tutor.
Darcia (ダーチャ, Dācha)
Voiced by: Kiyono Yasuno (Japanese); Marissa Lenti (English)
A seamstress and the daughter of a farmer. She has been sewing expertly since she was a child. Previously, she was jealous of the aristocracy of which Arte was a part, but she was impressed by her hard work and learned how to read and write with Arte teaching her.

== Media ==
=== Manga ===
Written and illustrated by Kei Ohkubo, Arte was serialized in Tokuma Shoten's Monthly Comic Zenon magazine from October 25, 2013, to April 25, 2025. As of June 2026, twenty-two tankōbon volumes have been published. The manga was formerly licensed in North America by Media Do, but is now licensed by digital manga publisher Comikey.

No.	Original release date	Original ISBN	English release date	English ISBN
1	April 19, 2014	978-4-19-980203-4	October 2, 2018	978-1-64-165318-3
2	November 20, 2014	978-4-19-980242-3	June 4, 2019	978-1-64-165321-3
3	June 20, 2015	978-4-19-980275-1	July 16, 2019	978-1-64-165322-0
4	November 20, 2015	978-4-19-980309-3	—	—
5	June 20, 2016	978-4-19-980348-2	—	—
6	January 20, 2017	978-4-19-980391-8	—	—
7	July 20, 2017	978-4-19-980431-1	—	—
8	January 20, 2018	978-4-19-980473-1	—	—
9	July 20, 2018	978-4-19-980504-2	—	—
10	January 19, 2019	978-4-19-980544-8	—	—
11	July 20, 2019	978-4-19-980582-0	—	—
12	January 20, 2020	978-4-19-980611-7	—	—
13	April 20, 2020	978-4-86-720015-5	—	—
14	January 20, 2021	978-4-86-720191-6	—	—
15	August 20, 2021	978-4-86-720256-2	—	—
16	March 19, 2022	978-4-86-720315-6	—	—
17	November 18, 2022	978-4-86-720441-2	—	—
18	August 19, 2023	978-4-86-720533-4	—	—
19	April 19, 2024	978-4-86-720636-2	—	—
20	October 19, 2024	978-4-86-720697-3	—	—
21	August 20, 2025	978-4-86-720795-6	—	—
22	June 19, 2026	978-4-86-720902-8	—	—

=== Anime ===
An anime television series adaptation was announced by Tokuma Shoten on July 19, 2019. The series was animated by Seven Arcs and directed by Takayuki Hamana, with Reiko Yoshida handling series composition and Chieko Miyakawa designing the characters. Gorō Itō composed the series' music. It aired from April 4 to June 20, 2020, on Tokyo MX, BS Fuji, and ytv. Maaya Sakamoto performed the opening theme song "Clover", while Kiyono Yasuno performed the ending theme song "Hare Moyō".

On April 3, 2020, Funimation announced that they licensed the series for streaming in the U.S., Canada, the UK, and Ireland. On October 9, 2020, Funimation announced that the series would receive an English dub, which premiered the following day.

No.	Title (Note: All English titles are taken from Funimation.)	Original release date
1	"I Want to Be an Apprentice"; Transliteration: "Deshi Iri Shigan" (Japanese: 弟子入り志願)	April 4, 2020
In 16th century Florence during the Renaissance, Arte, a daughter of a noble but poor family, is obsessed with drawing. After her father's death, her mother destroys her artwork. Rejecting marriage, Arte decides to become an artisan. She visits local workshops, but is rejected due to being a woman. Humiliated, Arte cuts her hair and threatens to cut off her breasts, but is stopped by Leo, an unsocial local artisan. As a test, Leo challenges her to prepare 20 wood panels for painting by morning. It is revealed this is unreasonably difficult. Arte, unwilling to admit defeat, works through the night, damaging her hands. Leo is surprised to find her passed out the next morning with the boards finished and admits he wanted her to fail. Arte then admits she is determined to forge a life for herself using her own skills. Realizing Arte is exactly like his younger self, Leo makes Arte his official apprentice. Arte moves out of her family home, against her mother's orders, and moves into Leo's workshop, only to realize her room is a dilapidated shed on his roof. Regardless, she decides to do her best as Leo's apprentice.
2	"A New Life"; Transliteration: "Shin Seikatsu" (Japanese: 新生活)	April 11, 2020
Leo provides Arte money to repair her shed. However, while carrying materials home, she trips on her dress and is helped by a sculptor apprentice named Angelo Parker. Arte refuses to be thought of as helpless and ties up her dress for easier movement. She then repairs her shed. Confused, Angelo returns home to his five sisters who rely on him for most of the housework. Angelo's master, Danilo, rejects Arte's request to sketch his newest sculptor due to being a woman. Angelo offers to sneak Arte in the workshop, but Arte insists on convincing Danilo herself. Annoyed, Danilo tells Arte she can see the sculpture if she moves ten bags of clay. Determined, Arte figures out a way to carry them. Impressed, Danilo lets her sketch the sculpture, only to realize Arte strained her fingers and cannot grip her pencil. Angelo asks Arte to consider becoming Danilo's apprentice with allowances made for being a woman, but Arte refuses. Impressed by her effort, Angelo tells his sisters to try doing chores themselves before asking him. Leo is impressed by the new damage to Arte's fingers, proving she has worked hard.
3	"First Job"; Transliteration: "Saisho no Shigoto" (Japanese: 最初の仕事)	April 18, 2020
Leo decides to take Arte somewhere special, but insists she dress in men's clothing. While passing through carnival, they meet Leo's regular customer, a courtesan. Leo then takes Arte to observe a dissection, normally prohibited by the church except during carnival. Arte sketches the body to gain a better understanding of the human form. Arte is accidentally revealed as a woman and since women observing dissection is against Church law, they are forced to hide. Being so close, Arte experiences chest pain, which confuses her. Later, Leo asks Arte to sketch the Arno river for his newest painting of a woman. However, Leo rejects her sketch multiple times. Leo tells her to consider what is most important about the painting and she realizes she focused on the background when focus should have been on the woman. After drawing a less detailed sketch, Leo allows her to paint the background before handing it to the client. That night, Leo informs Arte they must renew her contract with the town notary, which will include a pay rise. He also compliments her spirit. Arte has chest pain again.
4	"Courtesan"; Transliteration: "Korutijāna" (Japanese: コルティジャーナ)	April 25, 2020
Arte continues to overreact around Leo. One of Leo's regular customers, the courtesan Veronica, requests a portrait for a client. Arte is surprised to find Veronica is well educated and cultured. Veronica in turn is surprised Arte does not judge her courtesan career, so she asks Arte to paint her portrait instead. Over several days, Arte and Veronica become close, but Leo notices Arte's distracted behavior. Arte confides in Veronica, who realizes Arte is in love with Leo. As a warning, Veronica shows Arte a former courtesan who fell in love and is now working as a common street prostitute. Over the next few days, Arte sees Veronica playing mind games on a client. Seeing his misery, Arte confronts Veronica about her cruelty. Struggling with the painting, Arte eventually overreacts when a customer insults the hard work of her local baker. She suddenly realizes Veronica also works hard at her job. Determined, she completes the painting and forces herself to act normally around Leo. Delivering the painting to Veronica, Arte admits that while she cannot respect how Veronica treats her clients, she does respect how hard she works to support herself. Veronica accepts this and they remain friends.
5	"Inescapable Bond"; Transliteration: "Kusare'en" (Japanese: 腐れ縁)	May 2, 2020
Arte struggles with hunger due to Leo's unusual meal practices. One of Leo's least favorite customers, Ubertino, commissions a painting, but the colors he wants are so expensive, Leo risks losing money and must negotiate. Arte offers to go in his place, but her first attempt fails, so she asks Veronica to teach her conversational skills. She visits Ubertino again and, knowing he is a wool merchant, shows that she can also design lace patterns. Ubertino agrees to pay more despite having no personal interest in paintings. When she asks why Ubertino commissions Leo so often, he angrily reveals it is due to their "inescapable bond". Arte asks Leo about his youth and he reveals he had to beg for an apprenticeship as he was a homeless beggar, and only his master gave him a chance. Ubertino is pleased with the painting but berates Leo for spending all his money on quality painting supplies instead of a decent meal. Ubertino's flashback shows he promised Leo's master on his deathbed he would look after Leo. Arte realizes Leo and Ubertino do care about each other in a dysfunctional manner and hopes to become that close to Leo.
6	"Trade Guild"; Transliteration: "Dōgyō Kumiai" (Japanese: 同業組合)	May 9, 2020
Arte attends the funeral of a master from Leo's guild. The other masters are honor bound to hire his now unemployed apprentices. Leo refuses another apprentice as his workshop is too small. Arte's presence causes a fight during a game of Calcio. The masters privately discuss Arte and decide she will join the apprentices painting a fresco in a newly built palace to test if she should remain Leo's apprentice. Leo is impressed when Arte fearlessly joins the other apprentices. During the work, many apprentices are impressed when Arte manages to keep up with the intensive labor. Guild Leader Aroldo realizes Arte reminds him of Leo as an apprentice, and plans to support Arte against the masters. With the fresco almost complete, Arte asks to join the apprentices playing Calcio and is accepted by the same apprentice who initially tried to reject her. Lord Yuri Falier, who commissioned the fresco's for his new palace, arrives from Venice and is particularly impressed by one of Arte's sketches, though he is surprised to learn they were drawn by a female apprentice.
7	"The Venetian Noble"; Transliteration: "Venetsia no Kizoku" (Japanese: ヴェネツィアの貴族)	May 16, 2020
Arte becomes friends with a seamstress named Darcia and begins teaching her how to read. Yuri asks Arte to become his family's artisan and tutor to his niece. Leo points out such job offers are rare for apprentices. In the end, she turns him down, preferring to continue training. Arte meets a heavily pregnant lady named Ruthanna. Leo shows great concern for Ruthanna as she is the only daughter of his deceased master. Arte learns from Darcia that Ruthanna's husband died and his greedy family are refusing to return her marriage dowry. Arte even overhears the mother-in-law revealing she only let an artisan's daughter marry her son because of the dowry. Yuri tries to convince Leo to convince Arte to take the job, causing Leo to wonder if he might be holding Arte back. Arte asks Yuri to intervene on Ruthanna's behalf in exchange for becoming his artisan for six months. In gratitude for helping Ruthanna, Leo promises Arte will still be his apprentice when she returns. With Yuri's assistance, Ruthanna receives her dowry and is able to return home to Siena, though she cryptically asks Arte to look after Leo.
8	"A New Chapter"; Transliteration: "Shintenchi" (Japanese: 新天地)	May 23, 2020
Arte tells her friends about going to Venice. Leo advises Arte long term employment is hard to come by, so if she decides to remain in Venice instead of returning to his workshop, he will understand. He also gives her a portable altarpiece he painted himself many years ago. As soon as Arte leaves, Leo realizes his workshop is now too quiet. While sailing to Venice, Arte struggles to gain her sea legs. Arte considers Leo's advice and worries he was glad to get rid of her. Feeling faint, Arte falls overboard, requiring Yuri to rescue her. She tells Yuri her worries and he reveals Leo wants her to take advantage of opportunities only available to her because she is a noble. Reassured Leo does not want her gone, Arte decides to refocus on her new job. They arrive in Venice where Arte is given new clothes and a room in the home of Yuri's sister-in-law, Sofia, and niece, Katarina. Katarina acts shy and polite around Yuri and Sofia, but the instant she is alone with Arte, she reveals her true personality as a rude, snobbish, entitled, lazy brat.
9	"Naughty Child"; Transliteration: "Akudō" (Japanese: 悪童)	May 30, 2020
Arte learns she will tutor Katarina in noble etiquette, but is surprised that Katarina has already mastered etiquette but hides this from her parents. Arte then learns from one of the maids, Daphne, that all Katarina's tutors eventually quit because of her attitude. The next day, Daphne takes Arte to a Venetian church to view the paintings. Arte is insulted by two male apprentices and Daphne is surprised when Arte is unaffected. Deciding to take more drastic steps, Arte forces Katarina to play games outdoors, which she greatly enjoys. Arte learns from Sofia she struggles to connect with Katarina as she was raised mostly by servants in another city, and her husband, Malta, is only interested in his sons. Later that night, Arte learns Katarina studies cookery in secret. The next day, Katarina is surprised and confused when Arte keeps her secret. She confronts Arte who reveals her mother burned her drawings so she sympathizes with Katarina's fear she will be kept from doing what she loves. Realizing she can trust Arte, Katarina decides to tell her everything over a meal.
10	"Katarina's Dinner"; Transliteration: "Katarīna no Bansan" (Japanese: カタリーナの晩餐)	June 6, 2020
At Yuri's home, Katarina happily cooks a large meal. Arte asks about Katarina's childhood and Yuri explains Katarina was raised by a wet nurse named Buona, alongside her son, Gimo. When Buona died, Katarina was taken away from everyone who raised her to live with her parents. Yuri helps Arte when he reveals that Gimo is living on Murano Island. Later, Arte overhears Malta tell Sofia that he will send Katarina to a convent to become a nun if things do not change. Arte then calls them both out. Afterwards, she tells Katarina she needs to stand up for what she wants. Convinced by Arte's words, Katarina decides to visit Gimo. When they arrive at Murano Island, Gimo explains to Katarina that while a friendship between them would never be allowed by her parents, he still loves her like a sister. When they return to Venice, Malta tries to fire Arte, but Katarina surprises him by using her etiquette to request Arte stay. Realizing Arte was right, Sofia also stands up to a furious Malta to ensure Katarina's happiness. Sofia and Katarina then share their first real mother-daughter hug.
11	"The Faliers' Portrait Painter"; Transliteration: "Farieru-ke no Shōzō Gaka" (Japanese: ファリエル家の肖像画家)	June 13, 2020
Now able to focus on Sofia's portrait, Arte decides to visit a local painter's workshop. At the workshop, Arte meets an apprentice named Matei, who admits he is envious of her as being an educated female noble gives her career opportunities denied to most apprentices. Arte is confused by Matei's envy and begins spending more time working. In Florence, Leo is particularly bad tempered as he misses Arte. Ubertino then hires Leo to paint a church ceiling mural. Back in Venice, Arte becomes ill and Yuri scolds her for making Katarina cry. Arte later shows Katarina all the knowledge needed for even a simple painting. When Arte finishes Katarina's portrait, Katarina shows it to Matei to prove that Arte does not rely on her nobility for her hard work. Afterwards, Katarina admits she is angry at Arte for not accepting she was born noble. Arte tells all this to Yuri and he offers her a permanent job. Arte is reluctant, but Yuri points out it would disrespect her fellow painters not to take advantage of opportunities offered to her instead of them. Arte finally understands why Leo told her he would understand if she stayed in Venice.
12	"Apprentice"; Transliteration: "Deshi" (Japanese: 弟子)	June 20, 2020
After finishing Sofia's portrait, Arte must decide if she is going to stay or return to Florence. Meanwhile, Leo begins work on the church ceiling. Arte is visited by Matei, who apologizes to her for what he said. Realizing her talent is to be valued, Arte decides to return to Florence. Returning to Florence, she learns from Darcia that Leo contracted a fever and has been unconscious for several days. Ubertino assures Arte that Leo will recover, but is worried as the church deadline is only a week away. Arte decides to finish it herself, but realizes a week is not enough. To her amazement, everyone she has met since becoming Leo's apprentice help support her. Leo recovers and though he critiques several mistakes, he is proud of her work. Arte explains all the reasons why she wants to remain his apprentice and he accepts her back. The church opens to the public and even Arte's mother is impressed and proud. Arte reveals she secretly included all the people she cares about in the painting. Arte begins writing letters to Katarina, who decides to visit Arte one day. Arte happily returns to her chaotic life as Leo's apprentice.

== Reception ==
The series received mixed reviews from critics. Caitlin Moore of Anime Feminist, reviewed the first episode, saying she thought the series would be like Snow White with the Red Hair but it proved her wrong, saying that it had a "heart of steely determination" and said the series won her over when Arte chopped off her long braid and was "ready to cut off her own breasts before someone stops her." Moore went onto say she liked Arte's character, seeing the series as "something special" and noted that although the series had a vision for Renaissance-era Italy which was not aligned with historical accuracy, it was enough "grit and texture" to hold her interest. In a three-episode check-in on the same site, Dee gave a different view, saying that she was "totally lukewarm" about the series, arguing that it could be shallow, missed the mark on becoming "a charming, inspiring historical fiction" and criticized the possible romantic plotline between Arte and her painting teacher, Leo. In contrast, Stig Høgset of THEM Anime Reviews said the series went a "relatively cheerful" path with its message, with the core theme that Arte wants more control of her life, praised the animation for being "pretty decent" but argued that series could sometimes be a "bit on the nose" when it came to gender, while saying it was "fun to watch."
