= Yakusoku wa Iranai =

Single by Maaya Sakamoto

from the album Grapefruit
- Language: Japanese
- Released: April 24, 1996
- Recorded: 1996
- Genre: J-pop; Anime song
- Label: Victor Entertainment
- Composer: Yoko Kanno
- Lyricist: Yuho Iwasato
- Producer: Yoko Kanno

Maaya Sakamoto singles chronology
"Yakusoku wa Iranai" (1996)	"Gift" (1997)

"Yakusoku wa Iranai" (約束はいらない; lit. "No Need for Promises") is the first single by singer Maaya Sakamoto. Released on April 24, 1996, it was her debut single under composer Yoko Kanno. The song and "Tomodachi" appear in her debut anime, The Vision of Escaflowne. Both songs were included on Sakamoto's solo debut Grapefruit, with "Tomodachi" re-recorded in English as "My Best Friend."

== Background and release ==
Sakamoto began her career as a child actress at age 8, with experience in commercial jingles for brands such as Seibu Department Store and Nestlé, as well as voice acting for Japanese dubs of films like Jurassic Park, My Girl, and The Piano Lesson. At age 15, she auditioned for a voice acting role in the anime The Vision of Escaflowne, marking her first regular role in a TV anime. She recalled the opportunity to take on something new was initially nerve-wracking, but her fresh and unpolished demeanor was seen as a positive, leading to her selection for the lead role of Hitomi Kanzaki.

"Yakusoku wa Iranai" was the song created by Yoko Kanno as the theme song for the anime, and Yuho Iwasato was commissioned to write its lyrics. Regarding the creative process, Iwasato explained that she did not received detailed scripts for Escaflowne instead, she would get an email from Kanno along with the music, explaining things like, “This is the kind of anime, with this theme, and this kind of girl.”, and she did not know the anime's details all that well when coming up with the lyrics. Sakamoto was not initially considered to perform the theme song, and Kanno and her team struggled to find a suitable vocalist. Eventually, Kanno suggested Sakamoto to record a demo of the song, and this eventually led to her selection as the singer in a spontaneous decision. Sakamoto approached the recording with enthusiasm, guided by Kanno's direction, and treated it similarly to acting, aiming to meet the producer's vision. She described the transition from 15-second jingles to a full song as natural, but she approached it with a mix of excitement and nervousness, lacking a strong sense of artistic identity. Nevertheless, she approached the recording with enthusiasm, guided by Kanno's direction, and treated it similarly to acting, aiming to meet the producer's vision.

Recounting this period, Sakamoto stated, "My debut as a singer happened by chance, so I didn’t have any grand resolve or long-term goals. I stepped into this world with a very neutral mindset, so I truly had no sense of myself as an artist. I loved singing, and I was happy about the CD debut, of course, but looking back, I was very childish (...) I had sung for commercials before, but releasing a CD under my own name for others to listen to as a product was surprising even to me." Furthermore, Sakamoto remembered being shocked after visiting a local record store and seeing her name printed on "Yakusoku wa Iranai", commenting that "It felt completely different from performing on stage as a child actor. I loved the song and wanted people to hear it, but I also felt a bit embarrassed, thinking, “What if my friends see this?” It’s contradictory for someone in this line of work, but I’ve never been the type to want to stand out."

"Tomodachi", the b-side to the single, was also written by Iwasato and composed by Kanno. Regarding this song, Sakamoto commented: "[I] recorded "Yakusoku wa Iranai" when I was fifteen, but even though I was singing lines like Kimi o, Kimi o aishiteiru (I love you, I love you) at that age, I was more like, “What is love even?”. I can’t honestly say I understood the meaning of the lyrics back then. But the B-side song, “Tomodachi,” was something I could relate to as a high school student at the time."

== Critical reception ==
Writing for Animate Times, entertainment critic Junichi Tsukagoshi praised "Yakusoku wa Iranai" as a defining piece of 1990s anime music, crediting it with reshaping the concept of voice actors as musical artists. He described the song’s melody as "just purely beautiful" and highlighted its rare three-quarter time signature, noting that Yoko Kanno’s "somewhat eccentric" arrangement perfectly captures the fantastical essence of The Vision of Escaflowne. He emphasized that Yuho Iwasato's lyrics, which weave in Hitomi Kanzaki's name and echo the show's themes of destiny and otherworldly adventure, are "very good" and carry a prophetic quality. Tsukagoshi argued that the song’s magic lies in the balance between the "pure" vocal performance of a 15- to 16-year-old Maaya Sakamoto and the sharp, skillful contributions of Kanno and Iwasato, calling it a "classic" that stands out for its authenticity.

== Cover versions ==
"Yakusoku wa Iranai" has been covered by several artists, including Ikuko Inoue, Eri Kawai, Mikuni Shimokawa, and Junko Iwao. In 2015, The Band Apart covered the song for Sakamoto's tribute album Request.

In 2023, the song was sampled by JPEGMafia and Danny Brown on their song "Kingdom Hearts Key", (which features additional vocals by rapper Redveil), the ninth track off their collaborative album Scaring the Hoes.

In 2024, Nagi Yanagi covered the song for the CrosSing project. This version was released on digital platforms on June 26, 2024.

== Track listing ==
All lyrics are written by Yuho Iwasato; all music is composed by Yoko Kanno.

Yakusoku wa Iranai - 8-cm CD single
No.	Title	Length
1.	"Yakusoku wa Iranai" (約束はいらない)	3:32
2.	"Tomodachi" (ともだち)	3:40
3.	"Yakusoku wa Iranai" (Original Karaoke)	3:32
4.	"Hitomi's Tarot Reading" (ひとみのタロット占い) (voice monologue)	3:13
Total length:		13:57

== Personnel ==
Credits adapted from the liner notes of Yakusoku wa Iranai.

- Maaya Sakamoto – vocals
- Yoko Kanno – keyboards, arrangements, music production
- Masayoshi Furukawa – acoustic guitar
- Shunsuke Sakamoto – synthesizer manipulate (track 1)
- Keishi Urata – synthesizer manipulate (track 1)
- Gabriela Robin – backing vocals (track 1)
- Hitoshi Watanabe – bass (track 2)
- Shigeo Miyata – drums (track 2)
- Yoichi Okabe – percussion (track 2)
- Members of L'Orchestra Dell'Unione Musicisti Roma – strings (track 2)
- Hajime Mizoguchi – music and arrangements (track 4)

== Charts ==
Chart	Peak position	Sales
Oricon Weekly Singles	44	30,140
