= Kiseki no Umi =

- 8-cm CD single cover

Single by Maaya Sakamoto

from the album Single Collection+ Hotchpotch
- Language: Japanese
- B-side: "Active Heart"
- Released: April 22, 1998
- Genre: J-pop; anime song; world music
- Length: 4:22
- Label: Victor Entertainment
- Composer: Yoko Kanno
- Lyricist: Yuho Iwasato
- Producer: Yoko Kanno

Maaya Sakamoto singles chronology
"Gift" (1997)	"Kiseki no Umi" (1998)	"Hashiru" (1998)

"Kiseki no Umi" (奇跡の海; lit. 'Sea of Miracles') is a song by Japanese voice actress and singer Maaya Sakamoto, released as her third single on April 22, 1998, through Victor Entertainment. Co-written by Yuho Iwasato and Yoko Kanno, the song served as opening theme for the television anime series Record of Lodoss War: Chronicles of the Heroic Knight.

== Background ==
"Kiseki no Umi" was used as the second ending theme on the 1998 anime Record of Lodoss War: Chronicles of the Heroic Knight, marking the second time Sakamoto is commissioned to perform the opening theme song for an animated series since her debut single, "Yakusoku wa Iranai" released the year prior. Sakamoto commented that during the recording of the song, she fell ill with a sudden cold and high fever on the scheduled day, forcing the team to postpone the vocal tracking. Vocals were ultimately re-recorded several days later once she had recovered. Fellow label artist Akino Arai, who wrote the ending theme on the same series, contributed with backing vocals on the song. Retrospectively, Sakamoto noted that the vocal key of the track was intentionally set at an very high register, pushing the limits of her range at the time, although she gradually grew accustomed to it over the years.

The song was first included on the soundtrack album Record of Lodoss War: Chronicles of the Heroic Knight Original Soundtrack Vol. 1, released on June 24, 1998. Both "Kiseki no Umi" and its b-side, "Active Heart", were included on Sakamoto's compilation album Single Collection+ Hotchpotch, released on December 16, 1999.

== Critical reception ==
Writing for RAG Music Ranking, Jane Yoimachi described "Kiseki no Umi" as a "bold and majestic track that vividly evokes the world of the anime [Record of Lodoss War]", adding that "[Sakamoto] delivers a singing style in this song that somehow resembles folk music, showcasing the remarkable breadth of her expressive range as a singer."

== Commercial performance ==
"Kiseki no Umi" achieved modest but enduring commercial success on the Oricon Singles Chart. The single debuted and peaked at number 43 selling 6,740 during its first week, and remained within the Top 100 for a total of twelve weeks, with reported sales totaling 66,340 copies. This long-charting record made this single Sakamoto's best-selling release for a decade, until surpassed by "Triangler" in 2008.

== Legacy and impact ==
In 2025, "Kiseki no Umi" ranked eighth in a fan-voting initiative conducted as part of the celebrations of Sakamoto's thirtieth anniversary of her debut, leading up to the release of her second best-of album M30: Your Song.

== Cover versions ==
In 2015, singer-songwriter Akino Arai covered the song for Sakamoto's tribute album Request. Sakamoto specifically requested Arai to cover the song. Arai admitted feeling immense pressure, wondering if she could do justice to the transparent vocals of "teenage Maaya". Yet upon hearing the result, Sakamoto was struck by Arai's voice embodying both an eternal youthfulness she had always associated with her, and a newfound depth, drawing inspiration from seeing a nearby senior continue to evolve and sing over the years.

== Track listing ==
All lyrics are written by Yuho Iwasato; all music is composed by Yoko Kanno.

Kiseki no Umi – 8-cm CD single
No.	Title	Length
1.	"Kiseki no Umi" (奇跡の海, lit. 'Sea of Miracles')	4:22
2.	"Active Heart"	4:19
3.	"Kiseki no Umi" (Original Karaoke)	4:21
4.	"Active Heart" (Original Karaoke)	4:16
Total length:		17:18

== Charts ==
Chart performance for "Kiseki no Umi"
Chart (1998)	Peak position
Japan Singles (Oricon)	43
