= Hashiru =

- 8-cm CD single cover

Single by Maaya Sakamoto

from the album Dive
- Language: Japanese
- B-side: "Pilot"
- Released: November 21, 1998
- Genre: J-pop
- Length: 5:38
- Label: Victor Entertainment
- Composer: Yoko Kanno
- Lyricist: Yuho Iwasato
- Producer: Yoko Kanno

Maaya Sakamoto singles chronology
"Kiseki no Umi" (1999)	"Hashiru" (1998)	"Platinum" (1999)

"Hashiru" (走る; lit. 'Run') is a song by Japanese voice actress and singer Maaya Sakamoto, released as her fourth single on November 21, 1998, through Victor Entertainment. Co-written by Yuho Iwasato and Yoko Kanno, it served as the lead single from Sakamoto's second studio album Dive.

== Background ==
"Hashiru" was the second single released in 1998 by Sakamoto, following the chart success of "Kiseki no Umi." It is also her first single without an anime tie-in, and the first one to feature a photograph of herself on the front cover, as opposed to an anime illustration. The song was released as an advance single for the album Dive, which was released a month later. The single version of "Hashiru" features a different vocal recording than the album version. Sakamoto commented that the vocals for the single version were recorded first, and have "a more innocent-sounding voice" compared to the version on the album.

== Commercial performance ==
"Hashiru" debuted at number 87 on the Oricon Singles Chart, selling 2,300 copies. It remained on the chart for one week only.

== Legacy and impact ==
In 2025, "Hashiru" was included on Sakamoto's thirtieth-anniversary best-of album M30: Your Best, released by FlyingDog, specifically on the second disc featuring fifteen personal favorites chosen by musical collaborators who have supported her career. Its selection was made by music journalist Nariaki Usuki, editor-in-chief of Natalie Music. Reflecting on "Hashiru," Sakamoto noted that since its release, music enthusiasts and industry insiders have frequently praised the track, particularly highlighting its unusually long intro as remarkably stylish for its time. Usuki, on the other hand, explained his choice due to the profound first-impact the song had on him, as he was struck by Sakamoto's unexpectedly mature vocals for her age at the time.

== Cover versions ==
In 2007, Japanese model and singer Nana Akiyama covered the song, which was included as one of the B-sides of her fourth single.

== Track listing ==
All music is composed by Yoko Kanno.

Hashiru - 8-cm CD single
No.	Title	Lyrics	Length
1.	"Hashiru" (走る, lit. 'Run')	Yuho Iwasato	5:38
2.	"Pilot" (パイロット)	Maaya Sakamoto	3:59
3.	"Hashiru" (Vocal Off)		5:37
4.	"Pilot" (Vocal Off)		3:56
Total length:			17:18

== Personnel ==
Credits adapted from the liner notes of Dive.

- Yoko Kanno – keyboards, arrangements, production
- Maaya Sakamoto – vocals, backing vocals
- Gabriela Robin – backing vocals
- Neal Wilkinson – drums
- Andy Pask – bass
- Huge Burns – guitar
- Keishi Urata – sound architect
- Gavyn Wright – strings
- Isobel Griffiths – strings
- Yoichi Okabe – percussion

== Charts ==
Chart performance for "Hashiru"
Chart (1998)	Peak position
Japan Singles (Oricon)	87
