= Shiawase ni Tsuite Watashi ga Shitte Iru Itsutsu no Hōhō =

Single by Maaya Sakamoto

from the album Follow Me Up
- Released: January 28, 2015
- Studio: Victor Studio
- Genre: Pop
- Length: 4:40
- Label: FlyingDog
- Songwriters: Yuho Iwasato; Rasmus Faber
- Producers: Maaya Sakamoto; Rasmus Faber

Maaya Sakamoto singles chronology
"Replica" (2014)	"Shiawase ni Tsuite Watashi ga Shitte Iru Itsutsu no Hōhō" / "Shikisai" (2015)	"Kore Kara" (2015)

Audio sample
- "Shiawase ni Tsuite Watashi ga Shitte Iru Itsutsu no Hōhō": file; help

Music video
- "Shiawase ni Tsuite Watashi ga Shitte Iru Itsutsu no Hōhō" on YouTube

"Shiawase ni Tsuite Watashi ga Shitte Iru Itsutsu no Hōhō" (幸(しあわ)せについて私(わたし)が知(し)っている5(いつ)つの方法(ほうほう); lit. "The Five Keys to Happiness That I Know of") is a song recorded by Japanese singer Maaya Sakamoto, from the album Follow Me Up. It was released as a double A-side single alongside the song "Shikisai" by FlyingDog on January 28, 2015. The song was composed by Rasmus Faber, who also produced the track. The lyrics were written by Yuho Iwasato, marking the first collaboration between Sakamoto and Iwasato in four years, since "More Than Words". "Shiawase ni Tsuite Watashi ga Shitte Iru Itsutsu no Hōhō" is the opening theme to the TBS anime series Gourmet Girl Graffiti.

== Chart performance ==
"Shiawase ni Tsuite Watashi ga Shitte Iru Itsutsu no Hōhō" debuted on the Oricon Singles Chart at number 9, with 10,000 copies sold in first charting week. The single charted on the chart for sixteen weeks, selling a reported total of 17,000 copies sold.

== Track listing ==
No.	Title	Writer(s)	Arranger(s)	Length
1.	"Shiawase ni Tsuite Watashi ga Shitte Iru Itsutsu no Hōhō" (幸せについて私が知っている5つの方法, "The Five Keys to Happiness That I Know of")	Yuho Iwasato; Rasmus Faber	Faber	4:40
2.	"Shikisai"	Maaya Sakamoto; La La Larks	La La Larks; Ryō Eguchi; Tōru Ishitsuka	4:33
3.	"Kimi no Suki na Hito" (君の好きな人, "The One You Love")	Sakamoto; Kento Ohgiya	Ohgiya	4:54
4.	"Shiawase ni Tsuite Watashi ga Shitte Iru Itsutsu no Hōhō" (Instrumental)	Faber	Faber	4:40
5.	"Shikisai" (Instrumental)	La La Larks	La La Larks; Eguchi; Ishitsuka	4:30
Total length:				23:18

Limited Edition DVD: "Maaya Sakamoto × Masato Ishinari Studio Live 2014"
No.	Title	Length
1.	"Tegami"
2.	"Afternoon Repose"
3.	"Okaerinasai"

== Credits and personnel ==
Personnel

- Vocals, backing vocals – Maaya Sakamoto
- Songwriting – Yuho Iwasato, Rasmus Faber
- Production, arrangement, mixing, mastering, programming, electronic keyboard – Rasmus Faber
- Bass – Mad Midget
- Guitar – Jimmy Wahlsteen
- Strings – Claudia Bonfiglioli
- Engineering – Rasmus Faber, Takahiro Okubo

== Charts ==
Chart (2015)	Peak position	Sales
Japan Daily Singles (Oricon)	8	17,000
Japan Weekly Singles (Oricon)	9	17,000
Japan Hot 100 (Billboard)	16	17,000
Japan Hot Animation (Billboard)	6	17,000
Japan Hot Singles Sales (Billboard)	7	17,000
