= Shikisai =

Single by Maaya Sakamoto
- Released: January 27, 2015
- Studio: Victor Studio
- Genre: Pop
- Length: 4:33
- Label: FlyingDog
- Songwriters: Maaya Sakamoto; La La Larks
- Producers: Maaya Sakamoto; La La Larks

Maaya Sakamoto singles chronology
"Replica" (2014)	"Shikisai" / "Shiawase ni Tsuite Watashi ga Shitte Iru Itsutsu no Hōhō" (2015)	"Kore Kara" (2015)

Audio sample
- "Shikisai": file; help

"Shikisai" (色彩(しきさい); lit. "Color") is a song recorded by Japanese singer Maaya Sakamoto. It was released as a double A-side single alongside the song "Shiawase ni Tsuite Watashi ga Shitte Iru Itsutsu no Hōhō" by FlyingDog on January 28, 2015. The song was written by Sakamoto and composed and produced by the Japanese band La La Larks. "Shikisai" is the theme song to the Android and iOS role-playing game Fate/Grand Order. The song also serves as the theme song to the animated television film based on the game, Fate/Grand Order: First Order.

== Chart performance ==
"Shikisai" debuted on the Oricon Singles Chart at number 9, with 10,000 copies sold in first charting week. The single charted on the chart for sixteen weeks, selling a reported total of 17,000 copies sold.

== Track listing ==
No.	Title	Writer(s)	Arranger(s)	Length
1.	"Shiawase ni Tsuite Watashi ga Shitte Iru Itsutsu no Hōhō"	Yuho Iwasato; Rasmus Faber	Faber	4:40
2.	"Shikisai" (色彩, "Color")	Maaya Sakamoto; La La Larks	La La Larks; Ryō Eguchi; Tōru Ishitsuka	4:33
3.	"Kimi no Suki na Hito" (君の好きな人, "The One You Love")	Sakamoto; Kento Ohgiya	Ohgiya	4:54
4.	"Shiawase ni Tsuite Watashi ga Shitte Iru Itsutsu no Hōhō" (Instrumental)	Faber	Faber	4:40
5.	"Shikisai" (Instrumental)	La La Larks	La La Larks; Eguchi; Ishitsuka	4:30
Total length:				23:18

Limited Edition DVD: "Maaya Sakamoto × Masato Ishinari Studio Live 2014"
No.	Title	Length
1.	"Tegami"
2.	"Afternoon Repose"
3.	"Okaerinasai"

== Credits and personnel ==
Personnel

- Vocals – Maaya Sakamoto
- Backing vocals – Maaya Sakamoto, Yumi Uchimura
- Songwriting – Maaya Sakamoto, La La Larks
- Production, all instruments – La La Larks
- Arrangement – La La Larks, Ryō Eguchi, Tōru Ishitsuka
- Electronic keyboard, programming – Ryō Eguchi
- Bass – Keisuke Kubota
- Drums – Turkey
- Electric guitar – Ritsuo Mitsui
- Strings – Tomomi Tokunaga Strings
- Engineering, mixing – Hiromitsu Takasu

== Charts ==
Chart (2015–17)	Peak position
Japan Daily Singles (Oricon)	8
Japan Weekly Singles (Oricon)	9
Japan Hot Singles Sales (Billboard)	7
Japan Yearly Singles (Mora)	57

== Certifications ==
Region	Certification	Certified units/sales
Japan Physical	—	17,000
Japan (RIAJ) Digital single	Platinum	250,000^{*}
^{*} Sales figures based on certification alone.
