= Round Table (band) =

Japanese pop band

- Also known as: Round Table featuring Nino
- Origin: Japan
- Genres: Pop, Electronica, Shibuya-kei, Akishibu-kei
- Years active: 1997–2012 (hiatus), 2025
- Label: Victor Entertainment, Inc.
- Members: Katsutoshi Kitagawa; Rieko Ito
- Website: www.round-table.jp

Round Table is a Japanese pop band known mostly for their anime soundtracks. The band was formed in 1997 with Katsutoshi Kitagawa (vocals, guitar, and bass guitar) and Rieko Ito (vocals and keyboard) as band members. In 2002, Nino joined as a guest vocalist. Nino provides the main vocals for the songs while Kitagawa provides backing vocals. Since then their songs have often been credited as ROUND TABLE featuring Nino. The name of their fifth studio album overall and first featuring Nino, April, came from Nino's birth-month. The album contains their hit single that is most popularly known in the Anime demographic, "Let Me Be With You", as it was used for the opening song for the 2002 adapted anime television series Chobits.

On October 13th, 2025, Nino performed with ROUND TABLE for the first time in 13 years at a concert celebrating the 20th anniversary of Aria the Animation.

== Discography (Round Table) ==
=== Singles ===
- 29 June 1998: Big Wave '71 - EP
1. Ride on the Big Wave
2. Get on the Bicycle!
3. Exotic Ooh-Room
4. In the Season
5. Wild Chocolate Brothers
- 30 September 1998: Do The Afro!
1. Chocolate
2. Glass Green Polka
3. Do the Afro
4. One Day in the September
5. Little Brownie's Theme
- 27 January 1999: Cool Club Rule
1. Cool Club Rule
2. Domino Time Rag
3. Viva!Brownie
- 27 October 1999: Perfect World
1. Perfect World
2. Glad to Be Unhappy
3. Do It Again
- 6 December 2000: Every Every Every
1. Every Every Every
2. Radio Burnin'
3. All the Way Down
- 22 Jan 2021: アイリス'(Iris)
1. アイリス feat. Uruha Rushia

=== Albums ===
- 27 August 1997: World's End
1. Repeat after me
2. Windy
3. World's End
4. So Little Time
5. Mexican Drag Race
6. Arifureta Ichinichi (ありふれた1日)
7. One More Time!!
- 5 December 1997: Something in the Snow
1. Light a Candle
2. Tiny Adventure
3. Everybody's Talkin'
4. Radio Time a GO-GO!!
5. Up to Wednesday, 3p.m.
6. Revenge of the Radio Time
7. Picnic
8. Make a Wish, Blow Out a Candle
- 1 April 1998: Feelin' Groovy
1. How Do You Feel?
2. Feelin' Groovy
3. Don't Ask Me Why
4. Stillness
5. Highway 69
6. Mad Engine joe
7. Beat De Jump
8. Doo-Wop Feelin'
- 27 January 1999: Domino
1. Domino
2. Brownie
3. Cool Club Rule
4. Holiday
5. Play the March
6. Summer Rain
7. Battle Cop B.B.
8. Desert Side of the Moon
9. Ring a Bell
10. Christmas Time
11. Domino Again
12. Everything You Know
- 7 July 1999: Big Wave '72
1. Here Comes the Big Wave
2. Holiday (Mix '72)
3. One Little Cowboy
4. Let's Go to the Beach!
5. Jazz On a Holiday
6. Ukulele to the Beach
7. You Baby
8. Sunset Holiday
9. End Theme
10. Big Wave '71 (Reprise)
- 8 December 1999: Cannon Ball
1. Mr. Cannonballer
2. Perfect World
3. Moon Light
4. Everlasting Daydream
5. It's O.K.? Mr. No.1
6. Bamallama Baby
7. Mr. Cannonballer Strikes Back
8. FLY
9. Timeless
10. So Many Colors
11. Brand New Car
12. Say Goodbye
- 29 March 2000: Look Around (Greatest Hits Album)
1. Introduction
2. Chocolate
3. Cool Club Rule
4. Holiday (Mix '72)
5. World's End
6. Back on My Feet Again
7. Theme from Look Around
8. Radio Time a Go-Go!!
9. Brownie
10. Get on the Bicycle!
11. Windy
12. Beat De Jump
13. Picnic
14. It's a Sunshine Day - cover of the Brady Bunch song
15. Feelin' Groovy
16. Look Around Bossa
- 12 July 2000: Big Wave 2000 - EP
1. Viva! Samba Parade
2. Big Wave
3. Let's Go to the Beach! (Copacabana Mix)
4. Big Wave 2・0・0・0
5. Tiny Adventure (Cool Summer Mix)
6. Find Your Step!
7. Boys Don't Cry - cover of original by The Cure
8. Corcovado
9. Viva! Samba Carnival
- 31 January 2001: RADIO BURNIN'
1. Come On! Come On!
2. Every Every Every (Radio Radio Radio Mix)
3. Goin' to the Radio Show
4. Radio Time #1
5. Hello! It's You
6. No No - Yeah Yeah
7. Baby Baby
8. Radio Is Burning
9. Radio Time #2
10. Everyday
11. Across the Highway
12. 1,2,3 for Jump
13. No Reaction
14. You Are No.1
15. Good Night Rosie
16. Come On! Come On! (Reprise)
- 25 August 2003: Big Wave Sunset
1. Opening
2. Big Wave Sunset
3. Let Me
4. Bossa Rie
5. Youngmen Blues
6. Life
7. In the Rain
8. Tell Me Why
- 1 April 2009: Friday I'm in Love
1. Try a Little Happiness
2. My Girl
3. Under the Moonlight
4. Tooi Machikado (遠い街角)
5. Faraway
6. Friday Night
7. Summer Days
8. Nari Hibiku Kane (鳴り響く鐘)
9. Ai no Yukue (愛の行方)
10. Dancin' All Night
11. Let's Stay Together
12. Dance with Me

== Discography (Round Table featuring Nino) ==
=== Albums ===
Title	Album details	Peak positions
Title	Album details	JPN Oricon
April	Released: 23 April 2003; Label: Victor; Formats: CD	—
Nino	Released: 30 August 2006; Label: Victor; Formats: CD	49
Distance	Released: 24 December 2008; Label: Victor; Formats: CD	155
"—" denotes a recording that did not chart or was not released in that territory.

=== Compilations ===
Title	Album details	Peak positions
Title	Album details	JPN Oricon
Singles Best 2002–2012 Memories	Released: 28 November 2012; Label: Victor; Formats: CD, CD+DVD, digital	58

=== Singles ===
List of singles, with selected chart positions
Title	Date	Peak chart positions	Sales (JPN)	Album
Title	Date	Oricon Singles Charts	Sales (JPN)	Album
"Let Me Be with You"	24 April 2002	34		April
"New World"	22 January 2003	55		April
"Sunny Side Hill"	22 October 2003	112		Nino
"Groovin' Magic"	23 February 2005	103		Nino
"Rainbow"	21 October 2005	40		Nino
"Natsu Machi"	26 April 2006	23		Nino
"Puzzle"	20 July 2006	73		Nino
"Koi wo Shiteru"	25 June 2008	147		Distance
"Nagareboshi"	22 October 2008	74		Distance

=== Special ===
In 2007, the band created a song that ran in the credits of Clamp in Wonderland 2. It was included on the soundtrack.

- 24 October 2007: CLAMP IN WONDERLAND1&2 (PRECIOUS SONGS) - Clamp in Wonderland
1. action! - 坂本真綾
2. Oh! Yeah!! - ROUND TABLE Feat. Nino
3. あなただけのWONDERLAND - 広谷順子
4. 「あなた」が「しあわせ」であるように - 広谷順子
5. action! －without 坂本真綾－
6. Oh! Yeah!! －without Nino－
