= Androp =

Japanese rock band

androp
- Origin: Tokyo, Japan
- Genres: Alternative rock; hard rock; indie rock; indie pop; experimental rock; electronic rock; pop rock
- Years active: 2008–present
- Labels: Respire / Village Again (2008–2011) unBORDE (Warner Music) (2011–present)
- Members: Uchisawa Takahito (Vocals/Guitar); Satou Takuya (Guitar/Keyboards); Maeda Kyosuke (Bass); Ito Akihiko (Drums)
- Website: www.androp.jp

Androp (anne-drop, stylized as androp) is a Japanese rock band formed in 2008 in Tokyo. The band had their indie debut in 2009, and then signed on to a major label Warner Music Japan in 2011. Before their major debut, in November 2010 they contributed to the actress and singer Kou Shibasaki’s single “EUPHORIA”.

== History ==
The band was formed in 2008 around the vocalist, Uchisawa Takahito.

== Band members ==
- Uchisawa Takahito (内澤崇仁) – vocals, guitar
- Satou Takuya (佐藤拓也) – guitar, keyboards
- Maeda Kyosuke (前田恭介) – bass guitar
- Ito Akihiko (伊藤彬彦) – drums

== Discography ==
=== Albums ===
Year	Album details	Oricon charts
2009	anew: Released: December 16, 2009	134
2011	door: Released: February 16, 2011	15
2011	relight: Released: September 21, 2011	12
2012	one and zero: Released: December 19, 2012	14
2014	period: Released: March 5, 2014	10
2015	androp: Released: December 18, 2015	8
2016	best [and/drop]: Released: July 27, 2016	17
2016	blue: Released: October 12, 2016	19

=== Singles ===
Year	Title	Oricon charts	Billboard Japan Hot 100
2012	"World.Words.Lights./You": Released: February 15, 2012	19	22
2012	"Boohoo/AM0:40/Waltz": Released: August 22, 2012	19	18
2013	"Voice": Released: August 21, 2013	22	—
2013	"Missing": Released: November 27, 2013	27	—
2014	"Shout": Released: August 13, 2014	24	7
2015	"Ghost": Released: March 12, 2015	13	—
