= Platinum (Maaya Sakamoto song) =

Song by Maaya Sakamoto

- 8-cm CD single cover

Single by Maaya Sakamoto

from the album Single Collection+ Hotchpotch
- Released: October 21, 1999
- Recorded: 1999
- Genre: J-pop; anime song
- Length: 4:10
- Label: Victor Entertainment
- Composer: Yoko Kanno
- Lyricist: Yuho Iwasato
- Producer: Yoko Kanno

Maaya Sakamoto singles chronology
"Hashiru" (1998)	"Platinum" (1999)	"Yubiwa" (2000)

"Platinum" (Japanese: プラチナ, Hepburn: Purachina) is a song by Japanese voice actress and singer Maaya Sakamoto, released as her fifth single on October 21, 1999, through Victor Entertainment. Co-written by Yuho Iwasato and Yoko Kanno, the song served as the third opening theme for the television anime series Cardcaptor Sakura.

== Background and release ==
The song was composed and produced by Yoko Kanno for the Cardcaptor Sakura anime, specifically as the opening theme for the Sakura Card Act. Its working title during production was revealed to be "Tripper". The title was changed before the final recording, and some of the lyrics were rewritten accordingly (Note: In the opening storyboard published in TV Animation Cardcaptor Sakura Archives, the lyrics are listed as "I am a tripper.") The lyrics, penned by Yuho Iwasato, admittedly took notable effort, as Iwasato shared that she had to rewrite the chorus multiple times until achieving the final version. She recalled: "Back then, my kids were still little, and it was summer vacation. We were on a family trip to see a steam locomotive before it was decommissioned. I had this homework to revise the chorus, and in the middle of it, inspiration struck. I called Yoko Kanno from a diner in front of the station and said, "I think [the chorus should start as] 'I want to find it, I want to make it come true' (mitsuketai na, kanaetai na)." When that first line of the chorus came to me, I felt like I'd finally found the answer!"

An acoustic live version of "Platinum" was included as a bonus track on the single for the 2018 single "Clear". Sakamoto commented that this was intended to evoke fond memories for those rediscovering the Cardcaptor Sakura series.

== Conception and themes ==
According to Sakamoto, the lyrics evoke the optimism of youth awaiting wonderful things to happen.

Sakamoto's perception of the song's lyrics has undergone a significant transformation since she first recorded the song at age 19. Initially, she viewed herself very distant to the song's message, as she viewed the song's optimistic tone as contrasting sharply with her youthful sense of "tragic" determination, particularly with lines like "I want to become stronger and stronger" (motto motto tsuyoku naritai), which felt painfully aspirational given her self-perceived unreliability at the time. Over the years, however, after countless live performances, Sakamoto's interpretation of the song evolved, as she came to embrace the song's core message of belief as a catalyst for action, and particularly lyrics like "I want to become stronger and stronger (motto motto tsuyoku naritai)" and "A tiny light, but someday" (chiisana hikari dakedo itsuka wa), retain an emotional intensity that still brings her to tears, underscoring the song's enduring personal significance.

== Critical reception ==
Wiring for UtaTen, freelance writer Mayuka described "Platinum" as a "a powerful song about the strength and importance of believing", and noted how it stood in stark contrast to the upbeat vibe of "Catch You Catch Me" –the first ending of Cardcaptor Sakura–, delivering a mature ballad brimming with Sakura Kinomoto's newfound understanding and growth. She highlighted how lyrics such as "Just by believing, there's nothing you can't overcome," echoed the anime protagonist's iconic catchphrase "It'll absolutely be okay!," while lines like "I want to become even stronger" beautifully capture her gradual growth from overcoming hardships into adulthood. Calling it "a masterpiece that fans confidently recommend", she suggested listeners to experience it paired with the anime's opening animation to get the full experience.

Japanese magazine CD Journal praised the song's lyrics, which depict a "relentlessly positive world," as well as Sakamoto's singing, declaring that it "wholeheartedly affirms the power of belief with a refreshingly upbeat melody and a pure, untainted singing voice," linking its message to Japanese professional wrestler Antonio Inoki and his quote "As long as you have energy, you can do anything." Japanese media website NT Lab (ねとらぼ) also gave a positive review on the song, commenting: "[Its] liberating sound and uplifting chorus create a sense of excitement upon listening, perfectly matching the world of the [Cardcaptor Sakura] anime."

== Commercial performance ==
"Platinum" debuted and peaked at number 21 on the Oricon Singles Chart, selling 17,740 copies on its first week. The single charted for five weeks, with reported sales totaling 38,260 copies.

In 2017, following the announcement that Sakamoto would perform the opening theme for Cardcaptor Sakura: Clear Card Arc, "Platinum" garnered renewed interest, and subsequently entered the Billboard Japan Hot Animation chart for the first time on the week of October 4 that year, peaking at number 18. That same year, the song was certified gold by the Recording Industry Association of Japan.

== Legacy and impact ==
Sakamoto described "Platinum" as a "turning-point song" in her career, as well as a staple in live performances. The song also ranked first in a fan survey conducted for her twentieth debut anniversary, where fans listed their top three favorite songs via a CD-included postcard. Net Lab conducted a survey in 2022 on Maaya Sakamoto's most popular songs, upon which "Platinum" was ranked first. The song also ranked first on Sakamoto's official survey Maaya's Best Song: Tell Us Your Favorite Maaya Sakamoto Song (Maaya's Best Song ～あなたの一番好きな坂本真綾の曲を教えてください～)" for her thirtieth anniversary project for her 30th anniversary greatest hits album M30: Your Song, where it topped the list among 255 songs released under her name throughout her career.

Sakamoto recognizes it as one her fan-favorite songs, noting that numerous people have shared with her that it was the first CD they ever purchased. Initially she grappled with the song's overwhelming popularity, feeling conflicted as she entered her late 20s and 30s about being defined by a "cute" song from her youth. She admitted to a competitive drive to "surpass 'Platinum'" with newer work, fearing that fans might be nostalgic for her less polished, youthful delivery. However, her perspective evolved, particularly after a tour where she felt the version of "Platinum" she performed was the best in her career, a sentiment reinforced by the audience's enthusiastic response. Sakamoto eventually came to enjoy performing the song with confidence and joy, fully aware of its significance to fans who eagerly anticipate it.

The song has been covered by several artists, including Sakura Tange, Junko Iwao, Aika Yoshioka, Megumi Ogata, ChouCho, Kanako Takatsuki, Ayana Taketatsu, and Hiroko Moriguchi.

== Track listing ==
All music is composed by Yoko Kanno.

Platinum - 8-cm CD single
No.	Title	Lyrics	Length
1.	"Platinum" (プラチナ)	Yuho Iwasato	4:10
2.	"24" (Twenty-four)	Kazumi Someya	4:46
3.	"Platinum" (without Maaya)		4:10
4.	"24" (without Maaya)		4:45
Total length:			14:07

== Charts ==
1999 chart performance for "Platinum"
Chart (1999)	Peak position
Japan (Oricon)	21

2017–2018 chart performance for "Platinum"
Chart (2017–2018)	Peak position
Japan Hot Animation (Billboard Japan)	18
Japan Download Songs (Billboard Japan)	43

== Certifications ==
Region	Certification	Certified units/sales
Japan (RIAJ) Digital	Gold	100,000^{*}
^{*} Sales figures based on certification alone.
