= The Band Apart =

Japanese rock band

the band apart ザ・バンド・アパート
- Origin: Tokyo, Japan
- Genres: Alternative rock
- Years active: 1998–present
- Label: Asian Gothic
- Members: Takeshi Arai; Kawasaki Kouichi; Hara Masakazu; Kogure Eiichi
- Website: www.asiangothic.org/the_band_apart

the band apart (ザ・バンド・アパート, Za Bando Apāto; sometimes abbreviated as バンアパ, and stylized as "the band apart") is a Japanese rock band formed in Tokyo in 1998. Since their formation, they have released 9 albums, 20 EPs and 6 DVDs. Their album Adze of penguin (2008) reached number 9 on the Oricon Albums Chart.

== Discography ==
=== Studio albums ===
- K. and his Bike (2003)
- Quake and Brook (2005)
- Alfred and Cavity (2006)
- Adze of Penguin (2008)
- Scent of August (2011)
- 街の14景 (2013)
- 謎のオープンワールド (2015)
- Memories to Go (2017)
- Ninja of Four (2022)

=== Extended plays ===
- Fool Proof (2001)
- Eric. W (2002)
- Recognize (2004)
- Daniels (2006)
- Fadeouts (for Justice) (2007)
- Intoxication (2010)
- The Surface (2010)
- Detoxification (2011)
- 2012 (2012)
- Tokumaru (2013)
- Bongo (2014)
- TENNIS CLUB E.P. (2015)
- Daniels E.P. 2 (2016)
- Falling in Love (2018)
- POOL e.p. (2019)
- Sons are back e.p. (2020)
- August e.p. (2020)
- September e.p. (2020)
- October e.p. (2020)
- November e.p. (2020)

=== DVDs ===
- Eric the Fool Recognized His Bike Quakes (2005)
- Stanley on the 2nd floor (2007)
- Shits (2009)
- Blessing hamlet (2009)
- String 4 Snowman (2011)
- 510x283 (2014)
