= FlyingDog =

Japanese record label

FlyingDog, Inc.

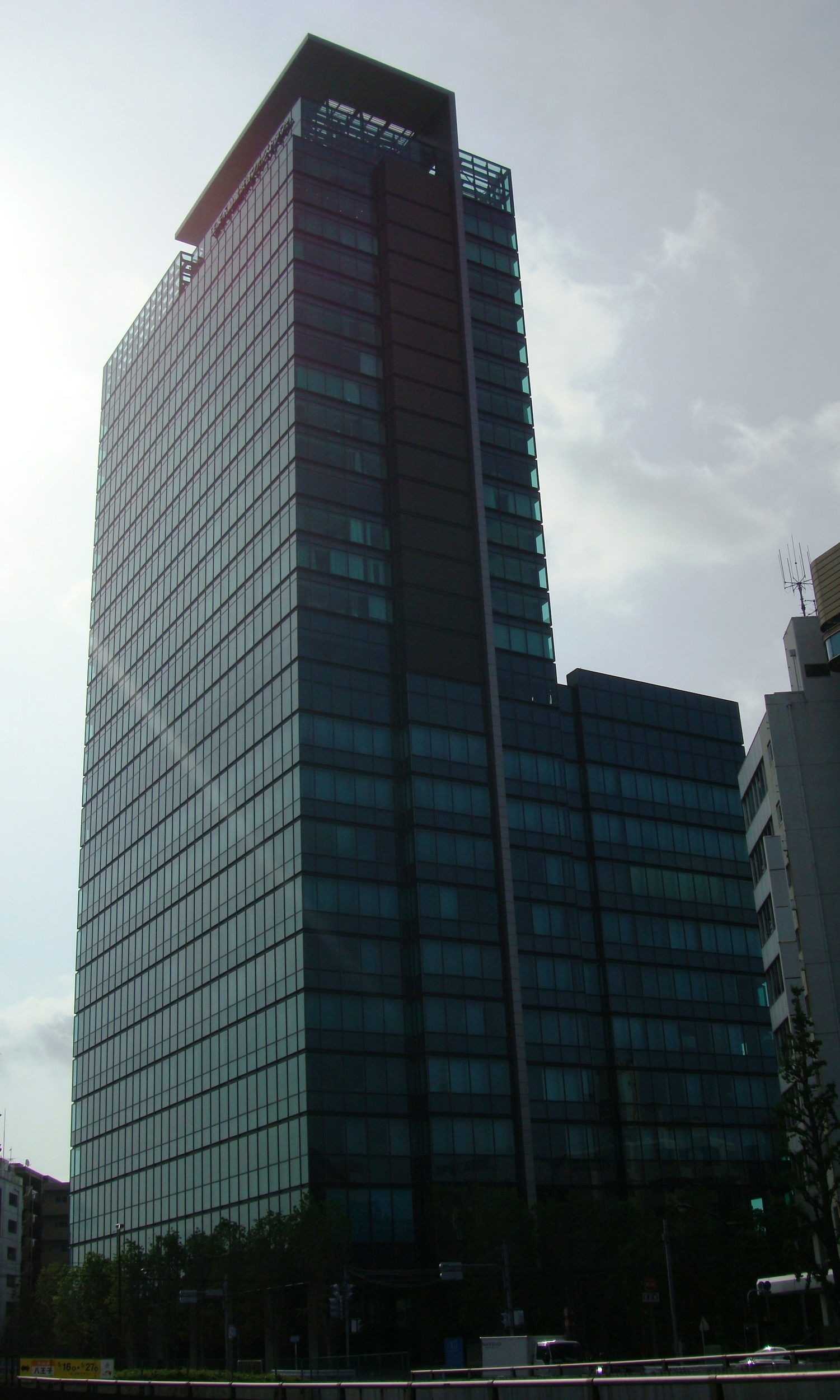
- Headquarters in Shibuya, Tokyo
- Formerly: JVC Entertainment Company, Ltd. (1997-2009)
- Type: Subsidiary
- Industry: Entertainment
- Founded: February 3, 1997; 29 years ago
- Headquarters: Higashi, Shibuya, Tokyo, Japan
- Key people: Shirō Sasaki (president)
- Website: www.jvcmusic.co.jp/flyingdog/

FlyingDog
- Parent company: Victor Entertainment
- Founded: 1967 (first incarnation); February 3, 1997 (second incarnation)
- Country of origin: Japan

FlyingDog, Inc. (株式会社フライングドッグ, Kabushiki-gaisha Furaingu Doggu; also stylized as flying DOG), is a Japanese record label formerly known as the Victor Entertainment subsidiary M-serve (stylized as m-serve), founded in 1997. FlyingDog is a record label that specializes in the production of animation-related video and music software and also handles planning and production of anime films and television series.

== History ==
The FlyingDog trademark was first used by Victor Entertainment in 1976, when it created a record label focusing on the promotion of rock artists that existed through 1980. It was home to artists such as Panta, Maki Nomiya, Masaru Watanabe, and June Yamagishi. In 1997, Victor Entertainment created the subsidiary M-serve which, in 2007, became FlyingDog, a record label officially mandated for the production and promotion of animation-related releases.

== Artists ==
- Yūka Aisaka
- Akino
- Akino Arai
- Yuki Kajiura
- Yoko Kanno
- Houko Kuwashima
- Maaya Sakamoto
- Shino Shimoji
- JUNNA
- Minori Suzuki
- Haruka Chisuga
- Nao Tōyama
- Megumi Nakajima
- Nano
- Yūka Nanri
- Shiena Nishizawa
- Iori Nomizu
- FictionJunction
- May'n
- Manami Numakura
- Kiyono Yasuno
- Minami
- Rei Nakashima
