= Maaya Sakamoto discography =

- Studio albums: 11
- Extended plays: 4
- Compilation albums: 7
- Singles: 37
- DVDs: 7
- Other appearances: 32

The discography of Japanese voice actress and singer Maaya Sakamoto consists of eleven studio albums, four extended plays, six compilation albums, and thirty-six official singles. Sakamoto debuted with her single "Yakusoku wa Iranai" in 1996, released by Victor Entertainment. Since 2007, she releases music under FlyingDog.

Her early albums, like Grapefruit (1997) and Dive (1998) were entirely produced by Yoko Kanno with Yuho Iwasato handling most of its lyrics. By Lucy (2001), Sakamoto’s songwriting emerged, as seven of the twelve tracks feature her own lyrics. Shōnen Alice (2003) marked the end of Yoko Kanno’s essential role behind Sakamoto's music. In 2005, Sakamoto released her first album to not feature Kanno, Yūnagi Loop (2005), in which she collaborated with diverse songwriters like H-Wonder, Takeshi Nakatsuka, Takayuki Hamasaki, and Shoko Suzuki. For Kazeyomi (2009), Sakamoto collaborated with musicians like Koichi Tabo, Kaori Kano, and Aco, and Katsutoshi Kitagawa, who would later became member of her live band and long collaborator. On this record, she also collaborated once again with Yoko Kanno on the hit single “Triangler,” which reached number three on Oricon Singles charts. In 2009, Sakamoto held her first live tour, Maaya Sakamoto Live Tour 2009 “Kazeyomi”, which was later released as her first live DVD titled Live Tour 2009 “We are Kazeyomi!”. This year she also released fifteenth-anniversary greatest hits album Everywhere, whose title track is Sakamoto’s first self-written and composed song. Her sixth studio album, You Can't Catch Me (2011), which features contributions from different songwriters, including Atsushi Suemitsu, Suneohair, and Hideyoshi Sakurai, became her first number one record on the Japanese charts. Her album Singer-Songwriter (2013) was entirely produced, written and composed by Sakamoto.

The 2015 tribute album Request features artists like Sugizo and Mayu Watanabe covering her songs. Mini-albums like Easy Listening (2001), 30Minutes Night Flight (2007), and Driving in the Silence (2011) explore different thematic concepts.

== Albums ==
=== Studio albums ===
Title	Album details	Peak chart positions	Sales
Title	Album details	JPN	Sales
Grapefruit	Released: April 23, 1997; Label: Victor Entertainment; Formats: CD, digital download	76	JPN: 4,000
Dive	Released: December 14, 1998; Label: Victor Entertainment; Formats: CD, digital download	44	JPN: 13,000
Lucy	Released: March 28, 2001; Label: Victor Entertainment; Formats: CD, digital download	16	JPN: 43,000
Shōnen Alice	Released: December 10, 2003; Label: Victor Entertainment; Formats: CD, digital download	8	JPN: 50,000
Yūnagi Loop	Released: October 26, 2005; Label: Victor Entertainment; Formats: CD, digital download	8	JPN: 45,000
Kazeyomi	Released: January 14, 2009; Label: FlyingDog; Formats: CD, digital download	3	JPN: 50,000
You Can't Catch Me	Released: January 12, 2011; Label: FlyingDog; Formats: CD, digital download	1	JPN: 40,000
Singer-Songwriter	Released: March 27, 2013; Label: FlyingDog; Formats: CD, digital download	6	JPN: 20,000
Follow Me Up	Released: September 30, 2015; Label: FlyingDog; Formats: CD, digital download	4	JPN: 22,000
Kyō Dake no Ongaku	Released: November 27, 2019; Label: FlyingDog; Formats: CD, digital download	11	JPN: 14,000
Kioku no Toshokan	Released: May 31, 2023; Label: FlyingDog; Formats: CD, digital download	7	JPN: 11,000

=== Extended plays ===
Title	Album details	Peak chart positions	Sales
Title	Album details	JPN	Sales
Easy Listening	Released: August 8, 2001; Label: Victor Entertainment; Formats: CD, digital download	12	JPN: 30,000
30 Minutes Night Flight	Released: March 21, 2007; Label: Victor Entertainment; Formats: CD, digital download	12	JPN: 30,000
Driving In The Silence	Released: November 9, 2011; Label: FlyingDog; Formats: CD, digital download	3	JPN: 20,000
Duets	Released: March 17, 2021; Label: FlyingDog; Formats: CD, digital download	14	JPN: 8,000

=== Compilation albums ===
Title	Album details	Peak chart positions	Sales
Title	Album details	JPN	Sales
Single Collection+ Hotchpotch	Released: December 16, 1999; Label: Victor Entertainment; Formats: CD, digital download	14	JPN: 60,000
Single Collection+ Nikopachi	Released: July 30, 2003; Label: Victor Entertainment; Formats: CD, digital download	3	JPN: 70,000
Everywhere	Released: March 31, 2010; Label: FlyingDog; Formats: CD, digital download	3	JPN: 65,000
Single Collection+ Mitsubachi	Released: November 14, 2014; Label: FlyingDog; Formats: CD, digital download	9	JPN: 30,000
Single Collection+ Achikochi	Released: July 15, 2020; Label: FlyingDog; Formats: CD, digital download	5	JPN: 20,000
M30: Your Best	Released: October 22, 2025; Label: FlyingDog; Formats: CD, digital download	7	JPN: 11,000
Yoin	Released: July 29, 2026; Label: FlyingDog; Formats: CD, digital download	4	

=== Live albums ===
Title	Album details
Live 2013 "Roots of SSW"	Released: February 5, 2014; Label: FlyingDog; Formats: Digital download
Live Tour 2015-2016 "Follow Me Up" Final at Nakano Sunplaza	Released: July 27, 2016; Label: FlyingDog; Formats: CD, DVD, digital download

=== Other albums ===
List of other albums with notes
Title	Description	Notes
"Chizu to Tegami to Koi no Uta" Yori - Haru	Released: March 21, 2007; Label: Victor Entertainment; Formats: Digital download	Digital compilation album released to commemorate Sakamoto's tenth anniversary in the music industry. It includes eleven spring-themed songs linked to Chizu to Tegami to Koi no Uta (地図と手紙と恋のうた, lit. 'Maps, Letters, and Love Songs'), Sakamoto's photo and lyrics collection book released on April 1, 2007.
Request	Released: April 22, 2015; Label: FlyingDog; Formats: CD, digital download	Tribute album released to commemorate Sakamoto's twentieth anniversary in the music industry. Its limited edition includes a bonus CD with the original tracks performed by Sakamoto.

== Singles ==
=== 1990s–2000s ===
List of singles as lead artist
Title	Year	Peak chart positions		Sales	Certifications	Album
Title	Year	JPN	JPN Hot 100 (Note: The Billboard Japan Hot 100 chart was established in 2008.)	Sales	Certifications	Album
"Yakusoku wa Iranai"	1996	44		JPN: 30,000		Grapefruit
"Gift"	1997	—				Single Collection+ Hotchpotch
"Kiseki no Umi"	1998	43		JPN: 65,000		Single Collection+ Hotchpotch
"Hashiru"	1998	87		JPN: 2,000		Dive
"Platinum"	1999	21	— (Note: In 2017, "Platinum" entered the Billboard Japan Hot Animation chart at number 18, and in 2018 it entered the download chart at number 43.)	JPN: 38,000	RIAJ (dig.): Gold	Single Collection+ Hotchpotch
"Yubiwa"	2000	30		JPN: 19,000		Single Collection+ Nikopachi
"Shippo no Uta"	2000	39		JPN: 11,000		Single Collection+ Nikopachi
"Mameshiba"	2000	47		JPN: 8,000		Lucy
"Hemisphere"	2002	22		JPN: 54,000		Single Collection+ Nikopachi
"Gravity"	2003	23		JPN: 27,000		Single Collection+ Nikopachi
"Tune the Rainbow"	2003	9		JPN: 39,000		Single Collection+ Nikopachi
"Loop"	2005	7		JPN: 42,000		Yūnagi Loop
"Kazemachi Jet"	2006	14		JPN: 21,000		Kazeyomi
"Spica"	2006	14		JPN: 21,000		Single Collection+ Mitsubachi
"Saigo no Kajitsu"	2007	19		JPN: 14,000		Kazeyomi
"Triangler"	2008	3	5	JPN: 91,000	RIAJ (dig.): Platinum	Kazeyomi
"Ame ga Furu"	2008	9	34	JPN: 21,000		Kazeyomi
"Magic Number"	2009	12	36	JPN: 20,000		Everywhere
"—" denotes a recording that did not chart or was not released in that territory.

=== 2010s ===
List of singles as lead artist
Title	Year	Peak chart positions		Sales	Certifications	Album
Title	Year	JPN	JPN Hot 100	Sales	Certifications	Album
"Utsukushii Hito"	2010	—	—			You Can't Catch Me
"Down Town"	2010	5	16	JPN: 25,000		You Can't Catch Me
"Yasashisa ni Tsutsumareta Nara"	2010	5	—	JPN: 25,000		Single Collection+ Mitsubachi
"Buddy"	2011	10	18	JPN: 22,000		Single Collection+ Mitsubachi
"Okaerinasai"	2011	8	13	JPN: 18,000		Single Collection+ Mitsubachi
"More Than Words"	2012	16	25	JPN: 16,000		Single Collection+ Mitsubachi
"Hajimari no Umi"	2013	19	22	JPN: 11,000		Follow Me Up
"Secrear"	2013	—	—			Single Collection+ Mitsubachi
"Be Mine!"	2014	7	22	JPN: 25,000		Follow Me Up
"Saved."	2014	7	18	JPN: 25,000		Follow Me Up
"Replica"	2014	17	24	JPN: 9,300		Follow Me Up
"Shiawase ni Tsuite Watashi ga Shitte Iru Itsutsu no Hōhō"	2015	9	16	JPN: 17,000		Follow Me Up
"Shikisai"	2015	9	26	JPN: 17,000	RIAJ (dig.): Platinum	Follow Me Up
"Kore Kara"	2015	—	— (Note: "Kore Kara" did not enter the Billboard Japan Hot 100, but peaked at number 20 on the Hot Animation chart.)			Follow Me Up
"Anata o Tamotsu Mono" (with Cornelius)	2015	18	46	JPN: 5,700		Single Collection+ Achikochi
"Mada Ugoku" (with Cornelius)	2015	18	—	JPN: 5,700		Single Collection+ Achikochi
"Million Clouds"	2016	24	35	JPN: 10,500		Single Collection+ Achikochi
"Clear"	2018	13	8	JPN: 15,600		Single Collection+ Achikochi
"Hello, Hello"	2018	15	43	JPN: 7,000		Single Collection+ Achikochi
"Gyakkō"	2018	4	4	JPN: 30,000	RIAJ (dig.): Gold	Single Collection+ Achikochi
"Uchū no Kioku"	2019	21	47	JPN: 5,800		Single Collection+ Achikochi
"—" denotes a recording that did not chart or was not released in that territory.

=== 2020s ===
List of singles as lead artist
Title	Year	Peak chart positions		Sales	Certifications	Album
Title	Year	JPN	JPN Hot 100	Sales	Certifications	Album
"Clover"	2020	— (Note: "Clover" did not enter the Oricon Weekly Singles chart, but peaked at number 31 on the Digital Singles chart.)	— (Note: "Clover" did not enter the Billboard Japan Hot 100, but peaked at number 35 on the download chart.)			Single Collection+ Achikochi
"Yakudō"	2020	6	17	JPN: 20,000	RIAJ (dig.): Gold	Yoin
"Dokuhaku"	2020	6	31	JPN: 20,000		Yoin
"Sumire"	2022	12	— (Note: "Sumire" did not enter the Billboard Japan Hot 100, but its double A-side single with "Kotoba ni Dekinai" peaked at number 13 on the Top Singles Sales chart. As a standalone single, it also entered the Hot Animation chart at number 14, and the download chart at number 24.)	JPN: 7,300		Kioku no Toshokan
"Kotoba ni Dekinai"	2022	12	— (Note: "Kotoba ni Dekinai" did not enter the Billboard Japan Hot 100, but its double A-side single with "Sumire" peaked at number 13 on the Top Singles Sales chart. As a standalone single, it also entered the download chart at number 55.)	JPN: 7,300		Kioku no Toshokan
"Mada Tōku ni Iru"	2023	11	— (Note: "Mada Tōku ni Iru" did not enter the Billboard Japan Hot 100, but its double A-side single with "Un_Mute" peaked at number 9 on the Top Singles Sales chart.)	JPN: 6,300		Kioku no Toshokan
"Un_mute"	2023	11	— (Note: "Un_Mute" did not enter the Billboard Japan Hot 100, but its double A-side single with "Mada Tōku ni Iru" peaked at number 9 on the Top Singles Sales chart.)	JPN: 6,300		Kioku no Toshokan
"Dakishimete"	2024	12	— (Note: "Dakishimete" did not enter the Billboard Japan Hot 100, but peaked at number 14 on the Top Singles Sales chart.)	JPN: 4,700		Non-album singles
"Nina"	2024	11	— (Note: "Nina" did not enter the Billboard Japan Hot 100, but peaked at number 11 on the Top Singles Sales chart.)	JPN: 4,600		Non-album singles
"Drops"	2025	7	— (Note: "Drops" did not enter the Billboard Japan Hot 100, but peaked at number 10 on the Top Singles Sales chart.)	JPN: 6,300		Non-album singles
"Tokei"	2025	— (Note: "Tokei" did not enter the Oricon Weekly Singles chart, but peaked at number 4 on the Digital Singles chart.)	95			Yoin
"—" denotes a recording that did not chart or was not released in that territory.

== Video albums ==
Title	Details	Notes
03†	Released: December 10, 2003; Formats: DVD	Short film directed by Hidenori Sugimori with music by Yoko Kanno.
Live Tour 2009 "We are Kazeyomi!"	Released: March 20, 2009; Formats: DVD	Concert held on January 24, 2009, at the Tokyo International Forum, the last date of Sakamoto's concert tour associated with her album Kazeyomi.
15th Anniversary Live "Gift" at Nippon Budokan	Released: August 11, 2010; Formats: DVD, Blu-ray disc	Concert held at the Nippon Budokan on March 31, 2010, the day of Sakamoto's 30th birthday, to commemorate the fifteenth anniversary of her debut.
Live 2011 "In the Silence"	Released: May 30, 2012; Formats: DVD, Blu-ray disc	Live concert held on December 16, 2011, at the Galaxy Theatre in Tennozu, Tokyo, where Sakamoto performed all the songs from her three concept albums —Easy Listening, 30 Minutes Night Flight, and Driving in the Silence— in the exact order of the discs, structured in three parts.
Maaya Best Clips	Released: January 23, 2013; Formats: DVD, Blu-ray disc	Released on the same day as Single Collection+ Mitsubachi, it has the same track list of the Blu-ray Disc included on the limited edition of that album.
Countdown Live 2012-2013: Tour “Mitsubachi” Final	Released: June 12, 2013; Formats: DVD, Blu-ray disc	Concert held on December 31, 2012, at the Nakano Sunplaza Hall in Tokyo.
20th Anniversary Live "Follow Me" at Saitama Super Arena	Released: November 25, 2015; Formats: DVD, Blu-ray disc	Concert held on April 25, 2015, at the Saitama Super Arena, to commemorate the twentieth anniversary of Sakamoto's debut.
25th Anniversary Live "Yakusoku wa Iranai" at Yokohama Arena	Released: October 27, 2021; Formats: DVD, Blu-ray disc	Concert held on March 21, 2021, at Yokohama Arena, the second day of Sakamoto's concerts to commemorate the twenty-fifth anniversary of her debut.
30th Anniversary Live "M30: Your Best" at Ariake Arena	Released: December 9, 2026; Formats: DVD, Blu-ray disc	Set of two stand-alone concerts held on April 18 and 19, 2026, at Ariake Arena, to commemorate Sakamoto's thirtieth anniversary of her debut.

== Other appearances ==
List of other appearances, showing other performing artists, year released, and album name
Title	Year	Other performer(s)	Album
"Yakusoku wa Iranai"	1996		The Vision of Escaflowne Original Soundtrack
"Pocket o Kara ni Shite"	1996		The Vision of Escaflowne Original Soundtrack
"Aoi Hitomi"	1996		The Vision of Escaflowne Original Soundtrack 3
"Hikari no Naka e"	1996		The Vision of Escaflowne Original Soundtrack 3
"Bokura no Rekishi"	1997		Clamp School Detectives Mini Sound Track
"Yakusoku wa Iranai" (TV Edit)	1997		The Vision of Escaflowne Lovers Only
"Tomodachi"	1997		The Vision of Escaflowne Lovers Only
"Kaze ga Fuku Hi"	1997		The Vision of Escaflowne Lovers Only
"Love Mania!" (as Qawool Towles)	1998	Rio Natsuki, Mifuyu Hiiragi, Etsuko Kozakura	The Mysterious World of El-Hazard Music Edition
"Asu e no Tobira: The Door Into Tomorrow"	1998		Asu e no Tobira ~The Door Into Tomorrow~
"Love Love Fantasy" (as Whoops!!)	1999	Chieko Higuchi	Love Love Fantasy
"Itsuka" (as Whoops!!)	1999	Chieko Higuchi	Love Love Fantasy
"Teens"	1999		Device Reign Soundtrack
"Jeanie"	1999	Chieko Higuchi	Jeanie
"Wasurenai yo..."	1999	Chieko Higuchi	Jeanie
"Dakishimete: 'Click' in My Heart"	1999	Chieko Higuchi	Tiles Complex -Yasashiku Furaretai-/Dakishimete: 'Click' in My Heart
"Story"	1999		Voice Carnival Music CD
"Wasurenai Mama"	1999		Voice Carnival Music CD
"Taikutsu to Yūtsu" (as Tanya Lipinski)	1999		Kita e. White Illumination Pure Songs and Pictures
"Yoake no Kaze Kikinagara" (as Moe Katsuragi)	1999		Yoake no Kaze Kikinagara
"Yumeiro Lollipop" (as Karin Junmai)	2000		Kōya no Medarot/Yumeiro Lollipop
"Dream Power -Tsubasa Naki Monotachi e-" (as A・G・A・S)	2000	A・G・A・S	Dream Power -Tsubasa Naki Monotachi e-
"Primary Days"	2000		Asu wa Koi Shite ~Prime Beat Planet~ Bonus CD
"Yubiwa" (Movie Ver.)	2000		Escaflowne Original Soundtrack
"You're Not Alone" (Hitomi & Sóra Duet Ver.)	2000	Shanti Snyder	Escaflowne Original Soundtrack
"Call Your Name" (Short Ver.)	2000		Escaflowne Prologue 1 Earth; Escaflowne Prologue 2 Gaea
"Yubiwa" (Acoustic Ver.)	2000		Escaflowne Prologue 1 Earth; Escaflowne Prologue 2 Gaea
"Haru no Petal"	2000		Napple Tale Kaiju Zukan
"Natsu no Petal"	2000		Napple Tale Kaiju Zukan
"Aki no Petal"	2000		Napple Tale Kaiju Zukan
"Fuyu no Petal"	2000		Napple Tale Kaiju Zukan
"Susumu Toki"	2000		Napple Tale Kaiju Zukan
"Modoru Toki"	2000		Napple Tale Kaiju Zukan
"Dreams in a Pie"	2000		Napple Tale Kaiju Zukan
"Sanctuary"	2001		Earth Girl Arjuna Original Soundtrack 2 Onna no Minato
"Saigo no Mameshiba"	2001		Earth Girl Arjuna Original Soundtrack 2 Onna no Minato
"Here"	2002		23-ji no Ongaku
"Daniel"	2002		23-ji no Ongaku
"Kissing the Christmas Killer"	2002		23-ji no Ongaku
"Trust me"	2002		23-ji no Ongaku
"Fado"	2002		23-ji no Ongaku
"Toto"	2002		23-ji no Ongaku
"Teens"	2003		Game Vocal Best ~Chiyomaru Shikura Music Collection Vol.1~
"Cloud 9"	2004		Wolf's Rain O.S.T. 2
"Tell Me What the Rain Knows"	2004		Wolf's Rain O.S.T. 2
"Mata Ashita!" (as Haruhi Fujioka)	2006	Mamoru Miyano, Masaya Matsukaze, Kenichi Suzumura, Yoshinori Fujita, Ayaka Saito, Daisuke Kirii	Ouran High School Host Club Soundtrack & Character Song Collection Part 2
"Action!"	2007		OVA 'Clamp In Wonderland 1 & 2' Theme Song Collection <Precious Songs>
"Choco to Yūki"	2008		CM Yoko
"Nyan Nyan Service Medley"	2008	May'n, Megumi Nakajima	Macross Frontier O.S.T.2 Nyan Tra☆
"Aimo: Koi no Uta" (as Ranshe)	2008		Macross Frontier Vocal Collection Nyan Tama♀
"Haha to Ko Ranka no Aimo" (as Ranshe)	2008	Megumi Nakajima	Macross Frontier Vocal Collection Nyan Tama♀
"Loop" (TV size)	2010		Tsubasa Chronicle Original Soundtrack - Future Soundscape I
"April Fool"	2011	Tomita Lab	Tomita Keiichi Works Best: Beautiful Songs to Remember
"Lazy Line Painter Jane"	2012	Atsushi Suemitsu	From Your Pianist
"Ichiban Toshigami no Minashigo"	2014		Daddy Long Legs ~From Ashinaga Ojisan~ Highlight Studio Recording CD
"Kono Hito wa Dare?"	2014		Daddy Long Legs ~From Ashinaga Ojisan~ Highlight Studio Recording CD
"Yana Ko"	2014		Daddy Long Legs ~From Ashinaga Ojisan~ Highlight Studio Recording CD
"Shiawase no Himitsu"	2014		Daddy Long Legs ~From Ashinaga Ojisan~ Highlight Studio Recording CD
"Sekai de Ichiban Wakaranai Hito"	2014		Daddy Long Legs ~From Ashinaga Ojisan~ Highlight Studio Recording CD
"Anata no Me no Iro" (Reprise 2)	2014		Daddy Long Legs ~From Ashinaga Ojisan~ Highlight Studio Recording CD
"Mr. Onna no Ko Kirai"	2014	Yoshio Inoue	Daddy Long Legs ~From Ashinaga Ojisan~ Highlight Studio Recording CD
"Hoka no Ko no You ni"	2014	Yoshio Inoue	Daddy Long Legs ~From Ashinaga Ojisan~ Highlight Studio Recording CD
"Shiranakatta Koto"	2014	Yoshio Inoue	Daddy Long Legs ~From Ashinaga Ojisan~ Highlight Studio Recording CD
"Anata no Me no Iro"	2014	Yoshio Inoue	Daddy Long Legs ~From Ashinaga Ojisan~ Highlight Studio Recording CD
"Rockwillow"	2014	Yoshio Inoue	Daddy Long Legs ~From Ashinaga Ojisan~ Highlight Studio Recording CD
"Anata no Me no Iro" (Reprise 1)	2014	Yoshio Inoue	Daddy Long Legs ~From Ashinaga Ojisan~ Highlight Studio Recording CD
"Show Window no Onna no Ko"	2014	Yoshio Inoue	Daddy Long Legs ~From Ashinaga Ojisan~ Highlight Studio Recording CD
"Shiawase no Himitsu" (Reprise)	2014	Yoshio Inoue	Daddy Long Legs ~From Ashinaga Ojisan~ Highlight Studio Recording CD
"Sotsugyoushiki"	2014	Yoshio Inoue	Daddy Long Legs ~From Ashinaga Ojisan~ Highlight Studio Recording CD
"Kokoro o Hikisaida"	2014	Yoshio Inoue	Daddy Long Legs ~From Ashinaga Ojisan~ Highlight Studio Recording CD
"Sotsugyoushiki" (Reprise)	2014	Yoshio Inoue	Daddy Long Legs ~From Ashinaga Ojisan~ Highlight Studio Recording CD
"Yana Yatsu" (Reprise)	2014	Yoshio Inoue	Daddy Long Legs ~From Ashinaga Ojisan~ Highlight Studio Recording CD
"Itsumo"	2014	Yoshio Inoue	Daddy Long Legs ~From Ashinaga Ojisan~ Highlight Studio Recording CD
"Hitomi Fall in Love" (20th Anniversary Version)	2014	Rikako Aikawa, Akiho Arai, Mayumi Iizuka, Mami Kingetsu, Yumiko Kobayashi, Lisa Komine, Tomo Saeki, Ryoko Shinya, Haruka Chisuga, Sako Chiba, POARO (Takashi Ifukube, Ken Washizaki), Risa Matsumoto, Akihi Mizuno, Mariya Yamamoto	Hitomi de Ele-phant!
"Waiting for the Rain" (TV edit)	2015		Gakusei Toshi Asterisk Original Soundtrack
"Arakawa Shōkei"	2016	Tomita Lab	Superfine
"Shikisai" (game size)	2017		Fate/Grand Order Original Soundtrack I
"Mikazuki"	2017		The Best Covers of Dreams Come True: Dori Uta Vol.1
"Tomoru Hikaru"	2018	Cornelius	Design Ah 2
"Clear" (TV size)	2018		Cardcaptor Sakura: Clear Card Original Soundtrack
"Ashita o Shiranai"	2018		Tribute to The Band Apart
"Gyakkō" (game size)	2019		Fate/Grand Order Original Soundtrack III
"Map for Love"	2021	Tomita Lab, Ryosuke Nagaoka, Kento Nagatsuka, Naz, Bird, Sakura Fujiwara, Yasuyuki Horigome, Sara Yoshida, Ryohu	7+
"Nankyoku ni Saku Hana e"	2021	Yoshiki Mizuno	Hiroba
"Dokuhaku" (game size)	2021		Fate/Grand Order Original Soundtrack V
"Break Free" (TV size ver.)	2022	Tsukasa Saito	Sing: Next Stage Original Soundtrack
"Mada Tōku ni Iru" (TV size ver.)	2024		The Fire Hunter Original Soundtrack
"Dakishimete" (TV size ver.)	2024		The Fire Hunter Original Soundtrack

== Songwriting credits ==
Year	Title	Artist	Album / EP	Credits	Label
2008	"Aimo (Tori no Uta)"	Ranka Lee (Megumi Nakajima)	Macross Frontier O.S.T.1 Nyan FRO.	Lyrics	FlyingDog
2008	"Ao no Ether"	Ranka Lee (Megumi Nakajima)	Macross Frontier O.S.T.2 Nyan TRA	Lyrics	FlyingDog
2008	"Aimo O.C."	Ranka Lee (Megumi Nakajima)	Macross Frontier O.S.T.2 Nyan TRA	Lyrics	FlyingDog
2016	"Watashi e"	Negicco	Tea for Three	Lyrics	T-Palette Records
2016	"Kaze wa Yokoku naku Fuku"	Walküre	Zettai Reido θ Novatic/Hametsu no Junjō	Lyrics	FlyingDog
2016	"Kaze wa Yokoku naku Fuku"	Freyja Wion (Minori Suzuki)	Walküre Trap!	Lyrics	FlyingDog
2018	"Crosswalk"	Minori Suzuki	Miru Mae ni Tobe!	Lyrics	FlyingDog
2018	"L'ambition"	Daisuke Namikawa	Picture	Lyrics	Lantis
2019	"Hikari no Kehai"	KinKi Kids	O Album	Lyrics	Johnny's Entertainment
2021	"Tōmei"	Mamoru Miyano	The Entertainment	Lyrics	King Records
2021	"Aishiteru"	Walküre	Walküre Reborn!	Lyrics	FlyingDog
2022	"Deeper"	Tomita Lab feat. Saori Hayami	+7	Lyrics	Speedstar Records
2022	"Latest Train"	Kohei Dojima	Fit	Lyrics	Quwabara² Records
