= Everywhere (Maaya Sakamoto album) =

Greatest hits album by Maaya Sakamoto
- Released: March 31, 2010
- Recorded: 1996–2010
- Genres: J-pop; anime song; alternative pop
- Label: FlyingDog
- Producers: Mitsuyoshi Tamura; Maaya Sakamoto

Maaya Sakamoto chronology
Kazeyomi (2009)	Everywhere (2010)	You Can't Catch Me (2011)

Everywhere is the first best-of album by Japanese voice actress and singer-songwriter Maaya Sakamoto, released on March 31, 2010, through FlyingDog. The double-disc compilation coincided with Sakamoto's thirtieth birthday and her live performance at the Nippon Budokan held on the same day, marking her fifteenth anniversary since her 1996 debut.

== Background and release ==
Having sung various television commercial songs as a child actress, Sakamoto debuted as a singer at age sixteen—while still in high school—with the single "Yakusoku wa Iranai" (1996). Collaborating closely with producer Yoko Kanno, she began writing her own lyrics as early as her debut album Grapefruit (1997), driven by a desire to meet the expectations of the adults around her and the thrill of discovering new facets of herself with each song. Entering university, she embraced a freer, more feminine expressiveness, which infused her third album Lucy (March 2001); the subsequent mini-album Easy Listening (August 2001) boldly incorporated electronic beats, marking vivid evolution with each release. Yet while cultivating a distinct artistic identity, she continued singing anime and drama theme songs. Her fourth album Shōnen Alice (2003) channeled the frustration and pain she felt for the first time by challenging herself by debuting on the musical Les Misérables, while also marking her departure from Kanno’s production. Sakamoto called her subsequent single in this new era, “Loop,” her “second debut.”

Everywhere compiles songs that were pivotal for Sakamoto at key moments over fifteen years. The album arrived at a point Sakamoto identified as a natural milestone, as her fifteenth anniversary carried deeper resonance than the tenth. For nine years, Sakamoto worked exclusively under producer Yoko Kanno. But a creative shift in her ninth year opened doors to collaborations with multiple songwriters, rendering a decade-mark reflection premature. She commented: “At the ten-year mark, I could not bring myself to look back [...] I felt like I had to look only forward.” That turning point aligned with her 2005 album Yūnagi Loop. Only after completing her 2009 album Kazeyomi did she feel the eras coalesce: “The things that had been separated in my mind—‘the Kanno era’ and ‘everything after’—finally came together as one.”

She personally selected all thirty tracks from her catalog spanning 1996 to 2009. The track order follows the sequence in which she wished to hear the songs. She selected "I.D." to be opening track of the album, as it expressed the internal conflict she had during the first years of her career, "being an ordinary high school girl on one hand, yet unable to fully share that with others", as her popularity as both a voice actress and singer soared. Five years after her “second debut,” she also decided to re-recorded "Loop," wanting to sing it again while deeply savoring its lyrics, while also being re-arranged. The closing track on the album is “Everywhere,” which marks Sakamoto's first time not only writing lyrics but also composing one of her songs. Sakamoto commented that the song was written during a five-week solo trip abroad in 2009. At a guesthouse piano, melody and lyrics arrived simultaneously. The track reflects a hard-won perspective: “The place to return to was right there all along.” Long focused on distant goals and self-criticism, Sakamoto arrived at gratitude for what was already near, influenced by the fulfillment of her artistic journey.

The album was released on SHM-CD format, as a standard and limited edition. The limited edition included a DVD featuring the music videos for "Magic Number" and "Everywhere".

== Critical reception ==
CD Journal praised "[Sakamoto's] crystal-clear vocals, lyrics drawn with fresh sensibility, and beautiful melodies" on the album, which showcased her fifteen-year career spanning the "golden duo era" with Yoko Kanno, to her collaborations with Shōko Suzuki and others musicians.

== Commercial performance ==
Everywhere debuted at number 3 on the Oricon Weekly Albums chart, selling 47,381 copies on its first week. The album charted for eleven weeks, with reported sales totaling 67,108 copies.

== Track listing ==
Everywhere - disc 1
No.	Title	Lyrics	Music	Arrangement	Length
1.	"I.D."	Maaya Sakamoto	Yoko Kanno	Kanno	4:39
2.	"Mameshiba" (マメシバ)	Sakamoto	Kanno	Kanno	6:07
3.	"Birds"	Sakamoto	Kanno	Hog	5:30
4.	"Uchū Hikōshi no Uta" (うちゅうひこうしのうた, lit. 'The Astronaut's Song')	Hiroshi Ichikura	Kanno	Kanno	3:45
5.	"Yubiwa (23 Carat)" (指輪 -23カラット-, lit. 'Ring (23 Carat')	Yuho Iwasato	Kanno	Kanno	3:41
6.	"Kiseki no Umi" (奇跡の海, lit. 'Sea of Miracles')	Iwasato	Kanno	Kanno	4:18
7.	"Hemisphere" (ヘミソフィア)	Iwasato	Kanno	Kanno	4:07
8.	"Kōcha" (紅茶, lit. 'Black Tea')	Sakamoto	Kanno	Kanno	5:31
9.	"Kaze ga Fuku Hi" (風が吹く日, lit. 'The Day When the Wind Blows')	Iwasato	Kanno	Kanno	5:53
10.	"Gift"	Iwasato	Kanno	Kanno	5:47
11.	"Pilot" (パイロット)	Sakamoto	Kanno	Kanno	3:55
12.	"Tune the Rainbow"	Iwasato	Kanno	Kanno	5:30
13.	"Kazamidori" (カザミドリ, lit. 'Weather Vane')	Sakamoto	Haruna Yokota	Zentaro Watanabe	4:50
14.	"Yakusoku wa Iranai" (約束はいらない, lit. 'Promises Not Needed')	Iwasato	Kanno	Kanno	3:32
15.	"Loop (Sunset Side)" (ループ～sunset side)	H's	H-Wonder	Toshiyuki Mori	4:49
Total length:					71:54

Everywhere - disc 2
No.	Title	Lyrics	Music	Arrangement	Length
1.	"Magic Number (123! Mix)" (マジックナンバー <123!mix>)	Sakamoto	Katsutoshi Kitagawa	Kitagawa; Shin Kono	4:58
2.	"Remedy"	Sakamoto	Solaya	Solaya	4:31
3.	"Hikari Are" (光あれ, lit. 'Let There Be Light')	Sakamoto	Kanno	Kanno	4:23
4.	"Boku-tachi ga Koi o Suru Riyū" (僕たちが恋をする理由, lit. 'The Reason Why We Fell in Love')	Sakamoto	Michiko Takada	Mori	5:31
5.	"Daniel" (ダニエル)	Troy	Kanno	Kanno	3:46
6.	"Yucca" (ユッカ)	Iwasato	Kanno	Kanno	4:54
7.	"Blind Summer Fish"	Sakamoto	Kanno	Hog	3:54
8.	"Gravity"	Troy	Kanno	Kanno	3:16
9.	"No Fear/Aisuru Koto" (NO FEAR／あいすること, lit. 'No Fear/To Love')	Shōko Suzuki	Suzuki	Suzuki	4:10
10.	"30 Minutes Night Flight"	Sakamoto	Toshiaki Yamada	Mori	5:58
11.	"Platinum" (プラチナ)	Iwasato	Kanno	Kanno	4:09
12.	"Feel Myself"	Iwasato; Sakamoto	Kanno	Kanno	6:54
13.	"Universe" (ユニバース)	Sakamoto	Suzuki	Mori	4:28
14.	"Pocket o Kara ni Shite" (ポケットを空にして, lit. 'Empty Your Pockets')	Iwasato	Kanno	Kanno	4:01
15.	"Everywhere"	Sakamoto	Sakamoto	Kono	5:36
Total length:					70:29

== Personnel ==
Credits adapted from the liner notes of Everywhere.

- Maaya Sakamoto – production, main vocals, backing vocals (disc 1: 1-4,7,9-12,14-15 / disc 2: 1-2,9,15)
- Mitsuyoshi Tamura (tmf) – production
- Yoko Kanno – sound production, acoustic piano & keyboards (disc 1: 1-2,4-12,14 / disc 2: 3,5-6,8,11-12,14)
- Hog – sound production (disc 1: 3 / disc 2: 7)
- Gabriela Robin – backing vocals (disc 1: 1-2,4-12,14 / disc 2: 3,5-6,8,11-12,14)
- Junko Hirotani – backing vocals (disc 1: 1-2,4-12,14 / disc 2: 3,5-6,8,11-12,14)
- M's precious – performance (disc 1: 3 / disc 2: 7)
- Yasuo Sano – drums (disc 1: 1-2,4-12,14 / disc 2: 1,15)
- Shigeo Miyata – drums (disc 1: 1-2,4-12,14 / disc 2: 3,5-6,8,11-12,14)
- Neal Wilkinson – drums (disc 1: 1-2,4-12,14 / disc 2: 3,5-6,8,11-12,14)
- Hitoshi Watanabe – bass (disc 1: 1-2,4-12,14 / disc 2: 3,5-6,8,11-12,14)
- Vagabond Suzuki – bass (disc 1: 1-2,4-12,14 / disc 2: 3,5-6,8,11-12,14)
- Andy Pask – bass (disc 1: 1-2,4-12,14 / disc 2: 3,5-6,8,11-12,14)
- Tsuneo Imahori – guitars (disc 1: 1-2,4-12,14 / disc 2: 1,3,5-6,8,11-12,14)
- Masayoshi Furukawa – guitars (disc 1: 1-2,4-12,14 / disc 2: 3,5-6,8,10-12,14)
- Hisaaki Hogari – guitars, additional ambient tracks (disc 1: 1-2,4-12,14 / disc 2: 3,5-6,8,11-12,14)
- Huge Burns – guitars (disc 1: 1-2,4-12,14 / disc 2: 3,5-6,8,11-12,14)
- Keishi Urata – synthesizer manipulating (disc 1: 1-2,4-12,14 / disc 2: 3,7)
- Shunsuke Sakamoto – synthesizer manipulating (disc 1: 1-2,4-12,14 / disc 2: 3,5-6,8,11-12,14)
- Yoichi Okabe – percussion (disc 1: 1-2,4-12,14 / disc 2: 3,5-6,8,11-12,14)
- Mataro Misawa – percussion (disc 1: 1-2,3,4-12,14 / disc 2: 1,3,5-6,7,8,11-12,14)
- Toshio Araki – trumpet (disc 1: 1-2,4-12,14 / disc 2: 3,5-6,8,11-12,14)
- Yoichi Murata – trombone (disc 1: 1-2,4-12,14 / disc 2: 3,5-6,8,11-12,14)
- Takuo Yamamoto – saxophone (disc 1: 1-2,4-12,14 / disc 2: 3,5-6,8,11-12,14)
- Naruyoshi Kikuchi – saxophone (disc 1: 1-2,4-12,14 / disc 2: 3,5-6,8,11-12,14)
- Hiroshi Shibayama – English horn (disc 1: 1-2,4-12,14 / disc 2: 3,5-6,8,11-12,14)
- Masatsugu Shinozaki Strings – strings (disc 1: 1-2,4-12,14 / disc 2: 3,5-6,8,11-12,14)
- Gen Ittetsu Strings – strings (disc 1: 1-2,4-12,14 / disc 2: 1,2,3,5-6,8,11-12,14)
- Gavyn Wright – orchestra reader (disc 1: 1-2,4-12,14 / disc 2: 3,5-6,8,11-12,14)
- Isobel Griffiths – contractor (disc 1: 1-2,4-12,14 / disc 2: 3,5-6,8,11-12,14)
- Kenji Fujii – guitars (disc 1: 3 / disc 2: 7)
- Seiichi Takubo – synthesizer manipulating (disc 1: 3 / disc 2: 7)
- Zentaro Watanabe – guitars, bass, programming (disc 1: 13)
- Kyoichi Shiino – drums (disc 1: 13)
- Tomoyuki Asakawa – acoustic piano (disc 1: 13), grand harp (disc 2: 13)
- Masami Horisawa – cello (disc 1: 13)
- Toshiyuki Mori – acoustic piano (disc 1: 15), synthesizer (disc 2: 4), all other instruments (disc 2: 10,13)
- Tom Tamada – drums (disc 1: 15)
- Yuji Okiyama – bass (disc 1: 15 / disc 2: 10,13)
- Hirokazu Ogura – guitars (disc 1: 15)
- Kō Okumura – trombone (disc 1: 15)
- Masahiko Sugasaka – flugel horn (disc 1: 15)
- Chiharu Mikuzuki – bass (disc 2: 1)
- Shin Kono – acoustic piano (disc 2: 1,15)
- Yasuhiro Hase – programming (disc 2: 1)
- Solaya – guitars, programming (disc 2: 2)
- Kazuya Miyano – bass (disc 2: 2)
- Satoru Shionoya – acoustic piano (disc 2: 4)
- Shōko Suzuki – acoustic piano, backing vocals (disc 2: 9)
- Satoshi Shoji – oboe (disc 2: 13)
- Nobumasa Yamada – percussion (disc 2: 13)
- Chieko Kinbara Strings – strings (disc 2: 13,15)
- Tomohiko Ohkanda – bass (disc 2: 15)
- Masato Ishinari – guitars (disc 2: 15)
- Masao Fukuda – A&R director
- Masashi Yabuhara – mixing engineer
- Nobumasa Yamada – mixing engineer
- Hirokazu Fukushima – mixing engineer
- Shinichi Akagawa – mixing engineer
- Seiji Sekine – mixing engineer
- Hiroshi Kawasaki – mastering engineer
- Hideki Kawaguchi – artist manager
- Shirō Sasaki – executive producer
- Rie Tomokane – A&R desk

== Charts ==
Chart performance for Everywhere
Chart (2010)	Peak position
Japan (Oricon)	3
Japan Top Album Sales (Billboard Japan)	4
