= Kazemachi Jet =

Single by Maaya Sakamoto

from the album Kazeyomi
- Language: Japanese
- A-side: "Spica" (double A-side)
- Released: June 14, 2006
- Genre: J-pop; anime song
- Length: 3:52
- Label: Victor Entertainment
- Composer: Shōko Suzuki
- Lyricist: Maaya Sakamoto
- Producers: Mitsuyoshi Tamura; Maaya Sakamoto

Maaya Sakamoto singles chronology
"Loop" (2005)	"Kazemachi Jet" / "Spica" (2006)	"Saigo no Kajitsu" (2007)

"Kazemachi Jet" (風待ちジェット; lit. 'Jet Awaiting Favorable Wind') is a song by Japanese singer-songwriter and voice actress Maaya Sakamoto. Co-written by Sakamoto and Shōko Suzuki, the song served as ending theme for the second season of the television anime series Tsubasa: Reservoir Chronicle, and was released as a double A-side single along with "Spica" on June 14, 2006, by Victor Entertainment.

== Development and release ==
In 2005, Sakamoto previously performed the ending theme "Loop" for the first season of Tsubasa: Reservoir Chronicle. Upon being commissioned to contribute with the ending theme for the second season of the series, she teamed up with Shōko Suzuki, whom she also worked with on her previous Yūnagi Loop ("No Fear/Aisuru Koto", "A Happy Ending"). From this process, Sakamoto came up with the songs "Kazemachi Jet" and "Spica", both of which were submitted as candidates to be the ending theme for Tsubasa. For writing the lyrics for "Kazemachi Jet," Sakamoto read the original script and envisioned consciously wrote something that would fit the story, while also wanting to stay true to her current emotional state at that time. She commented that she wrote the lyrics after the conclusion of her fan-club tour for her album Yūnagi Loop, while in a highly energized state due to recent live performances, which caused the lyrics to emerge quickly. She commented that she was satisfied with the result, as she was able to find the "perfect balance" between the things she was feeling and the world of Tsubasa. Sakamoto explained that her songwriting generally revolves around one or two core ideas expressed in various ways, and she aimed for a light, non-preachy tone so listeners might sing along unconsciously. For selecting the arrangements Sakamoto considered the animation's worldview and the ending sequence, aiming for a "sparkly, fantasy-flavored" vibe.

"Kazemachi Jet" was re-recorded and remixed for Sakamoto's 2009 album Kazeyomi under the title "Kazemachi Jet ~kazeyomi edition", which became a staple in her live performances following the Kazeyomi tour. A third version, featuring newly recorded vocals and a remix of the original track, later appeared on the 2012 compilation Single Collection+ Mitsubachi. She explained her motive to record yet another new version as an attempt document her current vocal approach and artistic growth years after the initial 2006 release.

== Composition and themes ==
Lyrically, "Kazemachi Jet" is centered on the perspective of Syaoran, the protagonist of Tsubasa: Reservoir Chronicle. It portrays his forward-looking determination, protective resolve toward Sakura, and boyish innocence. Despite occasional wavering or stumbling, Syaoran maintains a positive attitude and strength. The track also emphasizes his care for Sakura and his companions, as well as the friendships that develop through repeated encounters and partings during their journey. Additionally, Sakamoto intended to convey that people often underestimate their inner potential or worry excessively about limits, suggesting there may be something much greater within.

== Artwork ==
The photoshoot for the single took place at Honda Airport in Ogawa City, Saitama Prefecture.

== Commercial performance ==
"Kazemachi" (Note: As the double A-side single "Kazemachi Jet/Spica.") debuted at number 14 on the Oricon Weekly Singles Chart, selling 14,160 copies on its first week. The single charted for six weeks, with reported sales totaling 21,670 copies.

== Track listing ==
All lyrics are written by Maaya Sakamoto.

Kazemachi Jet/Spica - CD single
No.	Title	Music	Arrangement	Length
1.	"Kazemachi Jet" (風待ちジェット)	Shōko Suzuki	Takahiro Iida	3:52
2.	"Spica" (スピカ)	H-Wonder	H-Wonder	4:14
3.	"Kazemachi Jet" (without Maaya)			3:52
4.	"Spica" (without Maaya)			4:11
Total length:				16:09

== Personnel ==
Credits adapted from the liner notes of the CD single.

- Maaya Sakamoto – songwriting, vocals, backing vocals, production
- Shōko Suzuki – songwriting, piano, chorus arrangements
- Takahiro Iida – arrangements, chorus arrangements, other instruments
- Taichi Nakamura – guitar
- Naoto – violin
- Seiji Sekine – mixing engineer
- Shohei Kasuya – mixing assistant
- Kayo Abe – coordinator
- Hiroshi Kawasaki – mastering
- Mitsuyoshi Tamura – production
- Hidekazu Maiyama – artwork photographer

== Charts ==
Chart performance for "Kazemachi Jet"
Chart (2006)	Peak position
Japan Singles (Oricon)	14
