= Easy Listening (disambiguation) =

Easy listening is a popular music genre and radio format.

Easy Listening may also refer to:

- Easy Listening (Johnny Smith album), 1958
- Easy Listening (Maaya Sakamoto album), 2001
- Easy Listening (Pigface album), 2003
- Easy Listening (Billboard chart), a music chart from the 1960s and 1970s that ranked songs by the amount of airplay received on easy listening (now referred to as adult contemporary) radio stations in the United States.
- "Easy Listening", a song from the album Archaeology by the Rutles
