= Spica (Maaya Sakamoto song) =

Single by Maaya Sakamoto

from the album Single Collection+ Mitsubachi
- Language: Japanese
- A-side: "Kazemachi Jet" (double A-side)
- Released: June 14, 2006
- Genre: J-pop; anime song
- Length: 4:14
- Label: Victor Entertainment
- Composer: H-Wonder
- Lyricist: Maaya Sakamoto
- Producers: Mitsuyoshi Tamura; Maaya Sakamoto

Maaya Sakamoto singles chronology
| "Loop" (2005) | "Kazemachi Jet" / "Spica" (2006) | "Saigo no Kajitsu" (2007) |

"Spica" (スピカ) is a song by Japanese singer-songwriter and voice actress Maaya Sakamoto. Co-written by Sakamoto and H-Wonder, the song served as insert song for the second season of the television anime series Tsubasa: Reservoir Chronicle, and was released as a double A-side single along with "Kazemachi Jet" on June 14, 2006, by Victor Entertainment.

== Background and release ==
"Spica" originated as one of several demo tracks created for potential use as the ending theme for the second season of Tsubasa: Reservoir Chronicle. Both "Spica" and the A-side "Kazemachi Jet" were among the final candidates considered for use in the series, and Sakamoto wrote the lyrics for both tracks while envisioning the anime's world, ensuring that each song aligned with its emotional tone despite their differing styles.

In contrast to "Kazemachi Jet," which channels straightforward positive energy and reflects the forward momentum of protagonist Syaoran, "Spica" was crafted to explore a different artistic desire: a song with distinctly feminine qualities. Sakamoto explained her inspiration on the song by stating: "I wanted to express not women's softness, but their strength—like maternal strength. I used to think maternity was something people gain with age, but I have come to think that women have it at their core no matter how young. Now that I am in my late twenties, I have started feeling the urge to protect younger kids or those weaker than me. I used to think it had nothing to do with me. Also, sometimes it is nice to sing as a woman who can support a guy."

Eventually "Kazemachi Jet" was selected as ending theme for the anime and, although written for the anime, "Spica" was not explicitly tied-in to Tsubasa: Reservoir Chronicle at the time of the announcement of the release of the double A-side single. However, the song was subsequently used as an insert song in the anime. "Spica" was not included on Sakamoto's 2008 album Kazeyomi, nor was it included on any soundtrack album of Tsubasa: Reservoir Chronicle. It ultimately made its first album appearance in the 2012 compilation Single Collection+ Mitsubachi.

== Composition and themes ==
"Spica" is written from the perspective of the Tsubasa: Reservoir Chronicle character Sakura, contrasting with the Syaoran-centered viewpoint of "Kazemachi Jet". Sakamoto described the song as conveying Sakura's supportive gaze toward Syaoran: “It is important to keep moving forward with courage, but also it is okay to show weakness sometimes.” The lyrics emphasize feminine strength and maternal nature, portraying a form of love expressed through quiet presence and emotional understanding rather than overt action. Sakamoto noted that while both songs share the same emotional core, they form a complementary pair, reflecting the dual perspectives of the anime's protagonists.

== Personnel ==
Credits adapted from the liner notes of the CD single.

- Maaya Sakamoto – songwriting, vocals, production
- H-Wonder – songwriting, all other instruments, arrangements
- Udai Shika – string arrangements
- Kenji Suzuki – guitar
- Chiharu Mikuzuki – bass
- Shoko Oki – violin
- Mikiko Ise – violin
- Kaori Naruse – viola
- Masayuki Nakahara – mixing engineer
- Yoshinobu Ohmura – mixing assistant
- Kohji Satoh – coordinator
- Hiroshi Kawasaki – mastering
- Mitsuyoshi Tamura – production

== Charts ==
Chart performance for "Spica"
| Chart (2006) | Peak position |
|---|---|
| Japan Singles (Oricon) (Note: As the double A-side single "Kazemachi Jet/Spica.") | 12 |
