= Kazeyomi =

Studio album by Maaya Sakamoto
- Released: January 14, 2009
- Genres: J-pop; anime song; pop rock
- Length: 58:10
- Language: Japanese
- Label: FlyingDog
- Producers: Mitsuyoshi Tamura; Maaya Sakamoto

Maaya Sakamoto chronology
| 30Minutes Night Flight (2007) | Kazeyomi (2009) | Everywhere (2010) |

Singles from Kazeyomi
- 1. "Kazemachi Jet" Released: June 14, 2006; 2. "Saigo no Kajitsu" Released: November 21, 2007; 3. "Triangler" Released: April 23, 2008; 4. "Ame ga Furu" Released: October 29, 2008

Kazeyomi (かぜよみ; lit. 'Wind Reading') is the sixth studio album by Japanese voice actress and singer Maaya Sakamoto, released on January 14, 2009, by FlyingDog.

== Background and release ==
Kazeyomi marks her first original full-length album in approximately three years since Yūnagi Loop, following the concept mini-album 30Minutes Night Flight released in March 2007. Sakamoto revealed she entered production with strong conviction that the album would be exceptional, which according to her it stemmed by feeling confidence she would be able to express her feelings effectively on the record. She attributed this mindset largely to recording "Traingler" the year prior, an upbeat track with deep band sounds unlike anything she had sung before; delivering it casually gave her the courage to break out of her own mold, leaving her unafraid of future challenges.

For the album, Sakamoto collaborated with a diverse array of composers and arrangers, including Yoko Kanno (following their reunion after approximately five years on the single "Triangler"), Shōko Suzuki, Neko Saito, Kaori Kano, Kōichi Tabo (Superfly), Shin Kono, Aco, and Zentaro Watanabe.

Apart from the previously-released single tracks "Saigo no Kajitsu", "Triangler", and "Ame ga Furu", notable tracks include the opening track "Vento," was sung entirely in Esperanto, with the title meaning "wind." She also re-recorded her 2006 single "Kazemachi Jet" with Shoko Suzuki's arrangement, with Suzuki also providing backing vocals in the chorus. The track "Ai no Ether" is a self-cover for the song used she wrote lyrics for Macross Frontier, recorded as a piano-and-vocals version with Yoko Kanno on piano. "Colors" reunited Sakamoto with lyricist Tim Jensen, whom she collaborated with on several of her English-lyrics songs in the past. As for "Kazamidori" Sakamoto commented that upon listening to the melody by Haruna Yokota she felt instantly inspired to come up with lyrics for it, which convey the message of "entrusting one’s fate to the wind while still walking firmly with free will." She positioned "Kazamidori" as the album's conceptual core, as it is about a theme that strongly overlaps with her own way of being.

Sakamoto viewed the work as the culmination of her musical journey since parting with longtime producer Yoko Kanno years earlier, incorporating influences from every experience in her life—positive and negative—into a complete acceptance of self. Upon completion, she felt quiet bliss rather than overwhelming emotion, stating, "I am so glad I have sung my way here."

The album title and partial track listing were revealed on November 10, 2008, with additional tracks announced on November 17, 2008, and the full track listing and CD artwork on December 1, 2008.

Two album was released in two format: a standard CD-only edition and a limited edition including a bonus DVD.

== Promotion ==
The album included several high-profile anime tie-ins, such as "Triangler", used as opening theme song for the television anime series Macross Frontier, and "Ame ga Furu" and "Remedy", which were used as ending themes for Linebarrels of Iron. "Kazemachi Jet" is a new version of the Tsubasa: Reservoir Chronicle ending theme provided by Sakamoto. "Saigo no Kajitsu" and "Sonic Boom" were used on the original video animation Tsubasa: Tokyo Revelations and Tsubasa: Spring Thunder Chronicles, respectively. Lastly, "Colors" was also used as image song for the Konica Minolta Planetarium "Manten" exhibit at Sunshine City, specifically tied to the program Planet Cafe: Hoshi no Niji (Rainbow of Stars).

== Critical reception ==
CD Journal highlighted Sakamoto's vocal delivery on Kazeyomi, noting how her singing seemed to revel in the variety of partnerships with composers like Yoko Kanno, Shoko Suzuki, and Kaori Kano, while appreciating her lyric-writing contributions to most tracks.

== Commercial performance ==
Kazeyomi debuted at number 3 on the Oricon Weekly Albums chart, selling 36,061 copies on its first week. The album charted for seven weeks, with reported sales totaling 53,246 copies.

== Track listing ==
All lyrics are written by Maaya Sakamoto, except where noted.

Kazeyomi track listing
| No. | Title | Lyrics | Music | Arrangement | Length |
|---|---|---|---|---|---|
| 1. | "Vento" | Mina Kubota | Kubota | Kubota | 1:39 |
| 2. | "Triangler" (トライアングラー) | Gabriela Robin | Yoko Kanno | Kanno | 4:39 |
| 3. | "Kazemachi Jet" (風待ちジェット, lit. 'Jet Awaiting Favorable Wind') (Kazeyomi edition) | | Shōko Suzuki | Suzuki | 4:20 |
| 4. | "Remedy" | | Solaya | Solaya | 4:34 |
| 5. | "Ame ga Furu" (雨が降る, lit. 'The Rain Falls') | | Kaori Kano | Neko Saito | 5:18 |
| 6. | "Get No Satisfaction!" | | Katsutoshi Kitagawa | Shin Kono | 4:15 |
| 7. | "Ao no Ether" (蒼のエーテル, lit. 'Blue Ether') | | Kanno | Kanno | 4:01 |
| 8. | "Shitsuren Cafe" (失恋カフェ, lit. 'Heartbreak Cafe') | | Kōichi Tabo | Taichi Nakamura | 4:17 |
| 9. | "Sonic Boom" | | Yūichi Ichikawa | Ichikawa | 4:23 |
| 10. | "Peanuts" (ピーナッツ) | | Shuichi Miyake | Miyake | 3:40 |
| 11. | "Saigo no Kajitsu" (さいごの果実, lit. 'The Last Fruit') | | Shōko Suzuki | Saito | 4:50 |
| 12. | "Colors" | Tim Jensen | Aco | Kono | 4:25 |
| 13. | "Kazamidori" (カザミドリ, lit. 'Weathervane') | | Haruna Yokota | Zentaro Watanabe | 4:55 |
| 14. | "Guitar Hiki ni Naritai na" (ギター弾きになりたいな, lit. 'I Want to Be a Guitar Player') | | Tomoki Kanda | Kanda | 2:54 |
| Total length: | | | | | 58:10 |

Limited edition DVD
| No. | Title | Length |
|---|---|---|
| 1. | "Saigo no Kajitsu" (Music video) |
| 2. | "Triangler" (Music video) |
| 3. | "Ame ga Furu" (Music video) |

== Personnel ==
Credits adapted from the liner notes of Kazeyomi.

- Maaya Sakamoto – lead vocals, backing vocals (all), hand clapping (10)
- Mina Kubota – acoustic piano (1)
- Yū Sugino Strings – strings (1)
- Yasuo Sano – drums (2, 6)
- Wataru Watanabe – electric bass (2)
- Tsuneo Imahori – guitars (2, 12)
- Yoko Kanno – keyboards (2), acoustic piano (7)
- Keiji Urata – synthesizer manipulation (2)
- Shunsuke Sakamoto – synthesizer manipulation (2)
- Masatsugu Shinozaki Strings – strings (2)
- Kiyoshi Kamada – drums (3)
- Mamoru Ōta – electric bass (3)
- Hirokazu Ogura – guitars (3)
- Shoko Suzuki – acoustic piano, Prophet-5, background vocals (3)
- Ryūji Yamamoto – Wurlitzer, synthesizer manipulation (3)
- Masahiro Takekawa – violin (3)
- Kazuya Miyano – electric bass (4)
- Gen Ittetsu Strings – strings (4)
- Solaya – all other instruments (4)
- Shigeo Miyata – drums (5, 11)
- Tomio Inoue – electric bass (5, 11)
- Haruo Kubota – electric guitar (5)
- Tadaei Yonekawa – acoustic guitar (5)
- Yuko Takahashi – percussion (5)
- Tomoyuki Asakawa – harp (5), acoustic piano (13)
- Great Eida Strings – strings (5, 11)
- Chikashi Mikazuki – electric bass (6)
- Jun Matsue – guitars (6)
- Shin Kono – synthesizer programming, keyboards (6, 12)
- Chieko Kinbara Strings – strings (6)
- Toyohiko Tamada – drums (8)
- Hideharu Munakata – electric bass (8)
- Taichi Nakamura – guitar (8)
- Kōji Igarashi – keyboards (8)
- Takushi Maeda – percussion (8)
- Takuo Yamamoto – tenor saxophone (8)
- Kōji Nishimura – trumpet (8)
- Yōichi Murata – trombone (8)
- Toshiyuki Sugino – drums (9)
- Tomoyuki Ishikawa – electric bass (9)
- Yuichi Ichikawa – guitars, programming (9)
- Yui Mutō – violin (9)
- Azusa Haraguchi – cello (9)
- Shuichi Miyake – all instruments (10)
- Cashew Nuts – hand clapping (10)
- Fumio Yanagisawa – guitar (11)
- Makoto Katayama – guitar (11)
- Matarō Misawa – percussion (11)
- Kyoichi Shiino – drums (13)
- Zentaro Watanabe – synthesizer programming, electric guitar, electric bass (13)
- Masami Horisawa – cello (13)
- Tomoki Kanda – guitars, mixing engineer (14)
- Kazuya Kotani – percussion (14)

== Charts ==
=== Weekly charts ===
Weekly chart performance for Kazeyomi
| Chart (2009) | Peak position |
|---|---|
| Japan (Oricon) | 3 |

=== Yearly charts ===
Yearly chart performance for Kazeyomi
| Chart (2009) | Position |
|---|---|
| Japan (Oricon) | 166 |
