= 30Minutes Night Flight =

- Standard edition cover

EP by Maaya Sakamoto
- Released: March 21, 2007
- Studio: Azrite Studio; Victor Studio; Amp-box
- Genre: J-pop
- Length: 30:00
- Language: Japanese
- Label: Victor Entertainment
- Producer: Toshiyuki Mori; Mitsuyoshi Tamura; Maaya Sakamoto

Maaya Sakamoto chronology
Yūnagi Loop (2005)	30Minutes Night Flight (2007)	Kazeyomi (2009)

30Minutes Night Flight is the second conceptual extended play by Japanese voice actress and singer Maaya Sakamoto, released on August 8, 2001, by Victor Entertainment. It consists of seven tracks that total exactly 30 minutes in length, and it revolves around an original story written by Sakamoto herself.

== Background and release ==
30Minutes Night Flight is Sakamoto's second conceptual mini-album, following Easy Listening (2001). Production of the album began around June 2006, with Sakamoto gathering songs and developing the idea over an extended period. She commented that her creative process began by writing a booklet story, scripting scenarios like a film director, then selecting or commissioning songs that would fit in it. When writing, Sakamoto commented she got inspiration from the idea of the ominous presence of space and the sky everyone's lives. She commented: "I wanted to capture moments where the vastness of space and the sky feel directly connected to everyday life. I wanted listeners to feel everyday life and the universe as one through the music—and I wanted to experience that sensation myself."

All tracks were composed first, with the lyric-writing process coming afterward. Sakamoto wrote lyrics for four of the album's tracks after receiving the completed compositions. For the title track "30Minutes Night Flight," Sakamoto commented that upon hearing the track sent by Toshiaki Yamada (of the band Gomes The Hitman) she immediately felt inspired and completed the lyrics on the same day, as she felt it perfectly matched her vision. For "Dreaming," Sakamoto declared she purposely wrote lyrics about "a hopeless, lingering ex-relationship" to contrast its gentle and bright melody, adding "I did not want it to leave a bad aftertaste, so the ending is fairly positive, but the lyrics themselves are actually pretty pathetic." "Kioku: There’s no End" was written and composed by Shōko Suzuki, whom Sakamoto previously worked with on Yūnagi Loop. Sakamoto revealed that she requested revisions to Shoko Suzuki's original lyrics, which initially depicted a fiercely independent woman capable of living independently. Noting Suzuki's own blend of femininity, cuteness, and resilient strength, Sakamoto asked her to "leave a little room for someone to want to protect her," ensuring the character retained vulnerability. The final version explores a profound theme of life and death, conveying that even after losing someone precious, connections endure across the vast universe. Sakamoto praised its dignified tone. "Bokutachi ga Koi o Suru Riyū" was the track Sakamoto spent the most time crafting for the album. Upon receiving Michiko Takada's composition, she had a clear vision but struggled to articulate it, wary of slipping into clichéd love-song territory; she aimed instead for a taut, tense atmosphere evoking winter air. Though it took considerable effort, she was highly satisfied with the result, believing it uniquely captured her current emotions about love and the deeper question of why people fall in love at all, distinguishing it from her previous love songs. The recording was done live in one take with just piano, synthesizer, and vocals. For "Setsuna," written and composed by Toshiaki Yamada, Sakamoto observed that lyrics by men often reveal a distinct sensibility from women's, noting how these particular lyrics convey a boyish, masculine romance reminiscent of the playful mischief of a literary teenage boy. Lastly, "Universe" was originally created to be played in a planetarium, a setting Sakamoto knows well as one of her favorite places, enabling her to vividly envision a fitting song. The lyrics begin in a personal, intimate space before expanding dramatically into cosmic vastness in the chorus. The phrase “6 billion lonelinesses” emerged first in her mind, becoming a core keyword alongside “universe,” with the rest of the lyrics constructed around them.

Unlike the varied arrangers on her previous studio album, Yūnagi Loop, for this record Sakamoto teamed with a single arranger and sound producer—Toshiyuki Mori, to create a unified sound.

30Minutes Night Flight was released in two formats: a standard edition and a limited edition, the latter including a bonus DVD containing a completely original animated short film produced by Gekidan Inu Curry, a new unit from Production I.G.

== Concepts and themes ==
The album was structured around an original story written by Sakamoto, which follows a woman who, during a sleepless night, opens her window and sees a silver toy airplane in the sky. She boards the plane and flies over cities, borders, and lives that mirror her own—realizing her loneliness is not unique: “People living all over the world, completely unrelated to her. Yet somehow, they all resemble her—worrying over the same things, laughing at the same sights”. The journey ascends to space, where Earth glows from countless human gazes like searchlights. Reassured, she returns to bed; upon waking, dawn begins as the plane fades.

Sakamoto further commented that the album was about “a 30-minute night flight dedicated to everyone who has ever spent a sleepless night”.

== Artwork ==
The album’s cover artwork was shot in Finland, featuring photos of Sakamoto that also tie in with her lyric collection Chizu to Tegami to Koi no Uta, released on April 18, 2007.

== Promotion ==
The album track "Universe" was played at Tokyo's Ikebukuro Planetarium "Starlight Dome Manten" for the program Night Flight: World Starry Skies - Music from Maaya Sakamoto until May 2007.

== Commercial performance ==
30Minutes Night Flight debuted at number 12 on the Oricon Weekly Albums chart, selling 18,484 copies on its first week. The album charted for seven weeks, with reported sales totaling 29,219 copies.

== Track listing ==
30Minutes Night Flight track listing
No.	Title	Lyrics	Music	Length
1.	"30Minutes Night Flight"	Maaya Sakamoto	Toshiaki Yamada	5:55
2.	"Dreaming" (ドリーミング)	Sakamoto	Kensuke Okuda	4:01
3.	"Kioku: There's No End" (記憶 -there's no end, lit. 'Memories: There's No End')	Shōko Suzuki	Suzuki	4:25
4.	"Bokutachi ga Koi o Suru Riyū" (僕たちが恋をする理由, lit. 'The Reason Why We Fell in Love')	Sakamoto	Michiko Takada	5:34
5.	"Setsuna" (セツナ, lit. 'Fleeting Moment')	Yamada	Yamada	4:23
6.	"Universe" (ユニバース)	Sakamoto	Suzuki	4:31
7.	"30Minutes Night Flight: Sound of a New Day"		Toshiyuki Mori	1:09
Total length:				30:00

Limited edition bonus DVD
No.	Title	Director	Length
1.	"Universe" (Short Film)	Production I.G

== Personnel ==
Credits adapted from the liner notes of 30Minutes Night Flight.

- Maaya Sakamoto – main vocals, backing vocals, production
- Mitsuyoshi Tamura – production
- Toshiyuki Mori – sound production, arrangements, programming, manipulating, all instruments (1, 3, 7); Rhodes & Hammond organ (2); synthesizer (4); piano, Hammond organ, minimoog (5); all other instruments (6)
- Yuji Okiyama – bass (1, 6)
- Masayoshi Furukawa – guitars (1, 2)
- Nobuo Eguchi – drums (2)
- Hideki Matsubara – bass (2)
- Motoya Hamaguchi – percussion (2)
- Michiko Takada – composition (4)
- Satoru Shionoya – piano (4)
- Noriyasu Kawamura – drums, tambourine (5)
- Seiji Kameda – bass (5)
- Susumu Nishikawa – guitar (5)
- Tomoyuki Asakawa – grand harp (6)
- Satoshi Shoji – oboe (6)
- Nobumasa Yamada – percussion (6)
- Chieko Kinbara Strings – strings (6)
- Hiroshi Kawasaki – mastering
- Toshiyuki Mori – recording
- Nobumasa Yamada – recording, mixing
- Shohei Kasuya – assistant engineer
- Fumi Shinohara – assistant engineer
- Fumio Miyata – musician coordination
- Akira Shinkawa – assistant
- Noriyuki Ota – coordination
- Yukako Inoue – A&R
- Shirō Sasaki – executive producer
- Shigeaki Komatsu – executive producer

== Charts ==
Chart performance for 30Minutes Night Flight
Chart (2007)	Peak position
Japan (Oricon)	12
