= Saigo no Kajitsu / Mitsubachi to Kagakusha =

Single by Maaya Sakamoto

from the album Kazeyomi
- Released: November 21, 2007
- Recorded: 2007
- Genre: J-Pop
- Length: 19:48
- Label: Victor Entertainment
- Songwriters: Maaya Sakamoto, Shōko Suzuki, solaya, Neko Saitō

Maaya Sakamoto singles chronology
"Kazemachi Jet" / "Spica" (2006)	"Saigo no Kajitsu / Mitsubachi to Kagakusha" (2007)	"Triangler" (2008)

Music video
- "Saigo no Kajitsu" on YouTube

"Saigo no Kajitsu / Mitsubachi to Kagakusha" (さいごの果実 / ミツバチと科学者, The Last Fruit / The Honeybee and the Scientist) is Japanese singer Maaya Sakamoto's 14th single. "Saigo no Kajitsu" was featured as the ending theme for the Tsubasa Chronicle OVA Tokyo Revelations. When writing "Saigo no Kajitsu", Sakamoto described Syaoran's fate as sad because he becomes the antagonist of his friends and is a clone.

== Track listing ==
CD (VTCL-35008)
No.	Title	Lyrics	Music	Length
1.	"Saigo no Kajitsu (さいごの果実)" (Tsubasa TOKYO REVELATION ending theme song)	Maaya Sakamoto	Shōko Suzuki	4:51
2.	"Mitsubachi to Kagakusha (ミツバチと科学者)"	Maaya Sakamoto	solaya	3:49
3.	"Saigo no Kajitsu (w/o Maaya)" (Instrumental)		Shōko Suzuki	4:50
4.	"Mitsubachi to Kagakusha (w/o Maaya)" (Instrumental)		solaya	3:46
5.	"Saigo no Kajitsu (short size)" (Short Version)	Maaya Sakamoto	Shōko Suzuki	2:29
Total length:				19:48

== Charts ==
Chart	Peak position	Sales
Oricon Weekly Singles	19	14,152
