= Ame ga Furu =

Single by Maaya Sakamoto

from the album Kazeyomi
- B-side: "Praline"
- Released: October 29, 2008
- Recorded: 2008
- Genre: J-pop
- Length: 21:09
- Label: Victor Entertainment
- Songwriters: Maaya Sakamoto; Kaori Kano; Taiyo Yamazawa; Neko Saitō; Seiji Muto

Maaya Sakamoto singles chronology
"Triangler" (2008)	"Ame ga Furu" (2008)	"Magic Number" (2009)

Music video
- "Ame ga Furu" on YouTube

Ame ga Furu (雨が降る, It's raining) is Maaya Sakamoto's seventeenth single. The title track was used as the ending theme for the mecha anime Linebarrels of Iron.

== Track listing ==
CD (VTCL-35045)
No.	Title	Lyrics	Music	Length
1.	"Ame ga Furu (雨が降る)" (Linebarrels of Iron ending theme song)	Maaya Sakamoto	Kaori Kano; Neko Saito(arrange)	5:19
2.	"Praline (プラリネ)"	Maaya Sakamoto	Taiyo Yamazawa; Seiji Muto(arrange)	5:13
3.	"Ame ga Furu (w/o Maaya)" (Instrumental)		Kaori Kano; Neko Saito(arrange)	5:19
4.	"Praline (1+1)" (Piano and vocals only version)		Taiyo Yamazawa; Seiji Muto(arrange)	5:18
Total length:				21:09

== Charts ==
Chart	Peak position	Sales
Oricon Weekly Singles	9	21,766
