= Triangler =

Single by Maaya Sakamoto

from the album Kazeyomi
- B-side: "Kotomichi"
- Released: April 23, 2008
- Recorded: 2008
- Genre: J-pop
- Length: 18:52
- Label: Victor Entertainment
- Songwriters: Yoko Kanno, Gabriela Robin
- Producer: Yoko Kanno

Maaya Sakamoto singles chronology
"Saigo no Kajitsu / Mitsubachi to Kagakusha" (2007)	"Triangler" (2008)	"Ame ga Furu" (2008)

Music video
- "Triangler" on YouTube

"Triangler (トライアングラー)" is Maaya Sakamoto's sixteenth single. The title track was used as the opening theme for the mecha anime Macross Frontier and won the 2008 Animation Kobe award for best theme song. The single reached number 3 on Oricon weekly chart and so far is the best selling single of Maaya Sakamoto.

In April 2011, the song was certified as a gold download to cellphones by the RIAJ, for legal downloads in excess of 100,000.

== Track listing ==
CD (VTCL-35024)
No.	Title	Lyrics	Music	Length
1.	"Triangler (トライアングラー)" (Macross Frontier first opening theme song)	Gabriela Robin	Yoko Kanno	4:42
2.	"Kotomichi (ことみち, Different Paths)"	Maaya Sakamoto	Michiko Takada	4:47
3.	"Triangler (w/o Maaya)" (Instrumental)		Yoko Kanno	4:39
4.	"Kotomichi (w/o Maaya)" (Instrumental)		Michiko Takada	4:43
Total length:				18:52

== Charts ==
Chart	Peak position	Sales
Oricon Weekly Singles	3	91,539
2008 Oricon top 100 singles	76	

== Certifications ==
Digital downloads
Region	Certification	Certified units/sales
Japan (RIAJ)	Platinum	250,000^{*}
^{*} Sales figures based on certification alone.
