= Grapefruit (Maaya Sakamoto album) =

Studio album by Maaya Sakamoto
- Released: April 23, 1997
- Recorded: 1996–1997
- Studio: Victor Studio; Capri Digital Studio; Studio Forum
- Genre: J-pop
- Length: 51:59
- Label: Victor Entertainment
- Producer: Yoko Kanno

Maaya Sakamoto chronology
Grapefruit (1997)	Dive (1998)

Singles from Grapefruit
- 1. "Yakusoku wa Iranai" Released: April 24, 1996

Grapefuit (Japanese: グレープフルーツ, Hepburn: Gurēpufurūtsu) is the debut studio album by Japanese singer Maaya Sakamoto, released on April 23, 1997, by Victor Entertainment.

On March 24, 2010, the album was re-issued by FlyingDog.

== Background and development ==
In 1996, while Sakamoto was sixteen years old and still in high school, she was cast as the main role of the television anime series The Vision of Escaflowne. Yoko Kanno, who was in charge of the anime's music, had yet to choose someone to sing the opening theme for the series. Kanno requested a demo tape from Sakamoto, and upon hearing it, she decided to have her sing the theme song, "Yakusoku wa Iranai." Prior to this, Sakamoto had some studio experience, as she previously had sung in various commercial jingles, which made her comfortable in the studio environment. Thus, during the recording process, she commented the work atmosphere was relaxed, allowing her to enjoy the process rather than feel nervous. However, the decision to materialize her singing debut came unexpectedly, leaving her mentally unprepared and feeling like she did not fully understand the process. She would later comment about this process: "I was still a child [and] I kind of felt like I didn't really know what was going on [...] I was nowhere close to being ready mentally.”

While the release of "Yakusoku wa Iranai" materialized rapidly through a series of coincidences, she admittedly never envisioned a sustained recording career, as she had no formal music training and never imagined a career involving the consistent release of works. According to her, she loved singing and was delighted to be given the opportunity to sing, but at the time her main focus was being a student.

However, growing interest in her voice prompted a series of new songs and opportunities kept coming her way, leading her from one song to the next. Sakamoto assumed that interest in her associated somehow to kogal high school girls, although she neither resembled nor identified with the stereotype, as she saw herself as a teenager "with a personality that [had] always felt hesitant to draw attention to [herself]." Despite this, she approached each song request with quiet determination, forming her own interpretations of the requests and striving to meet them fully. During this period, she also had her first awareness of what would come "next," giving rise to the desire to "sing again someday." Beyond simply singing what was given, she began to feel, for the first time, the urge to imagine the future: "It would be nice to have a next," and "I’d like to try it this way next time." According to Sakamoto, every new track brought higher challenges, which she embraced with enjoyment, discovering new dimensions in her vocal range and expressive abilities. Repeating this process several times is what led to the collection of songs that was subsequently compiled into the album Grapefruit.

"I started singing by pure chance, and there is this utterly unguarded vibe from when I was 15 or 16—like I wasn't thinking at all [...] That raw, fresh innocence people talk about feels kind of embarrassing, almost shy-making. But capturing that fleeting moment of life in sound is something precious, and there are songs here that I don't think I will ever be able to sing again.”

– Sakamoto's comment on Grapefruit, Barks (2005)

Sakamoto commented that during the creation of the album she realized for the first time that some of the tracks were written especially for her—not tied to anime themes or insert songs, but solely for 'Maaya Sakamoto' as an artist. She found this profoundly moving, recognizing the rarity of music made exclusively for one individual amid the vast world of songs. This realization sparked her first sense of longing for a future in music: the desire to sing again, to imagine "what's next," and to envision how she might shape it herself, moving beyond simply performing what was given. Grapefruit also marked the first time Sakamoto wrote her own lyrics, introducing her personal thoughts into the creative process rather than relying solely on provided material. Throughout the lyric-writing, she received no suggestions or requests for revisions from anyone.

Lyricist Yuho Iwasato was approached by Yoko Kanno to contribute to Sakamoto's emerging solo project, and beginning with "Yakusoku wa Iranai," the first songs created for Sakamoto had The Vision of Escaflowne in mind—as they were commission as insert songs for the series, she saw her not as an anime vocalist, but as a standalone singer, and did not have the preconception of creating an "anime song" when working on her music. Iwasato further revealed that, in fact she did not know the story of Escaflowne in detail, and that when writing the lyrics for the insert songs, she rather had the image of the teenage Sakamoto who would end up recording the songs in mind. During the creative process, Iwasato commented that she had plenty of liberty and she was given the impression "everything was allowed." Although she was the lyricist, Kanno was completely fine with her changing the syllable placement however she pleased, which she would subsequently define her work triad with Kanno and Sakamoto an "experimental space beyond the usual role of a lyricist." Co-written with Iwasato, the album's opening track "Feel Myself" marked the first time Sakamoto penned her own lyrics.

== Promotion ==
Grapefruit is closely tied to the anime series The Vision of Escaflowne, which aired on TV Tokyo and featured several of Sakamoto's early recordings. Apart from the anime's opening theme "Yakusoku wa Iranai", the album includes the Escaflowne image song "Pocket o Kara ni Shite", which previously appeared on the album The Vision of Escaflowne Original Soundtrack, released on June 5, 1996. Additional Escaflowne-related tracks on the album include an English version of the insert song "Tomodachi" ("My Best Friend"), and "Aoi Hitomi", which appeared first on the album The Vision of Escaflowne Original Soundtrack 3, released on September 21, 1996, A compilation album titled The Vision of Escaflowne: Lovers Only, released on January 22, 1997, further promoted these connections by including the TV edit version of "Yakusoku wa Iranai" alongside the song "Kaze ga Fuku Hi."

== Critical reception ==
In a review for CD Journal, Grapefruit was praised for its youthful, sweet-and-sour charm, further adding: "[Its] lyrics, melody, and vocals all have a straightforward quality that feels refreshing. There is no forced effort to impress; the attitude of simply expressing what she wants to sing creates a sense of freshness [and] the arrangement is dedicated to supporting her world." Writing for Amazon Japan, musician Keiichi Okabe described the album as a blend of "a vocalist’s expressive power—unbelievable for a debut—with the fresh innocence typical of a first release," and praised Sakamoto's vocals, commenting: "Her voice and lyrics, brimming with the transparent purity unique to a girl on the cusp of adulthood, intertwine with high-quality tracks to create refreshing pop perfectly suited to the title Grapefruit."

== Commercial performance ==
Grapefruit debuted at number 76 on the Oricon Weekly Albums chart, selling 3,980 copies on its first week. The album only charted for one week.

== Track listing ==
All music is composed by Yoko Kanno.

Grapefruit track listing
No.	Title	Lyrics	Length
1.	"Feel Myself"	Yuho Iwasato; Maaya Sakamoto	6:56
2.	"I and I"	Iwasato	5:18
3.	"Grapefuit" (グレープフルーツ)	Iwasato	5:23
4.	"Migi Hoppe no Nikibi" (右ほっペのニキビ, lit. 'A Pimple On My Right Cheek')	Sakamoto	4:05
5.	"Pocket o Kara ni Shite" (ポケットを空にして, lit. 'Empty Your Pockets')	Iwasato	4:04
6.	"Orenji-iro to Yubikiri" (オレンジ色とゆびきり, lit. 'Orange Color and a Pinky Promise')	Sakamoto	4:46
7.	"Aoi Hitomi" (青い瞳, lit. 'Blue Eyes') (Remix)	Iwasato	3:19
8.	"Yakusoku wa Iranai" (約束はいらない, lit. 'I Don't Need Promises')	Iwasato	3:34
9.	"My Best Friend (Note: English version of "Tomodachi".)"	Etsuko	3:42
10.	"Kaze ga Fuku Hi" (風が吹く日, lit. 'The Day When the Wind Blows') (Maaya version)	Iwasato	5:56
11.	"Sono Mama de Ii n da" (そのままでいいんだ, lit. 'It's Okay That Way')	Gabriela Robin	4:51
Total length:			51:59

== Personnel ==
Credits adapted from the liner notes of Grapefruit.

- Yoko Kanno – songwriting, arrangements, production, keyboards, accordion (7)
- Maaya Sakamoto – vocals, songwriting (1, 4, 6)
- Yuho Iwasato – songwriting (1–3, 5, 7–10)
- Etsuko – English lyrics translation (9)
- Gabriela Robin – lyrics (11), backing vocals (8)
- Shigeo Miyata – drums (1, 5, 9)
- Hitoshi Watanabe – bass (1–6, 9–10), mandolin (5)
- Tsuneo Imahori – guitar (1–4, 6, 10–11)
- Masayoshi Furukawa – guitar (1), acoustic guitar (5, 8)
- Keishi Urata – synthesizer manipulation
- Ikuo Kakehashi – percussion (1)
- Toshio Araki – trumpet (1)
- Yoichi Murata – trombone (1)
- Takuo Yamamoto – alto saxophone (1)
- Yoshie Hiragakura – drums (2, 4)
- Mataro Misawa – percussion (2, 4)
- Masatsugu Shinozaki Group – strings (2, 4)
- Yoichi Okabe – percussion (5, 9)
- Shunsuke Sakamoto – synthesizer manipulation (5, 8)
- Yasuo Sano – drums (6, 10)
- Yuichiro Goto Group – strings (7)
- Members of L'Orchestra dell'Unione Musicisti Roma – strings (9)
- Hiroshi Shibayama – English horn (10)
- Shirō Sasaki – A&R
- Yukako Inoue – A&R
- Toshiaki Ota – recording coordination
- Saeko Nishimura – artist management
- Shinichi Akagawa – recording, mixing
- Masashi Yabuhara – recording, mixing
- Yoshikazu Sasahara – recording
- Hideaki Okuhara – recording
- Franco Patrignani – recording
- Yukie Ishimoto – assistant engineer
- Alessandro Ara Benedetti – assistant engineer
- Nick Friend – assistant engineer
- Hiroshi Kawasaki – mastering

== Charts ==
Chart performance for Grapefruit
Chart (1997)	Peak position
Japanese Albums (Oricon)	76
