= Loop (Maaya Sakamoto song) =

Single by Maaya Sakamoto
- Released: May 10, 2005
- Genre: J-pop
- Label: Victor Entertainment
- Songwriters: Maaya Sakamoto, h-wonder

Maaya Sakamoto singles chronology
"Tune the Rainbow" (2003)	"Loop" (2005)	"Kazemachi Jet" / "Spica" (2006)

"Loop" (ループ, Rūpu) is the 12th single by Japanese singer Maaya Sakamoto. It was her first single that was not composed by Yoko Kanno.

"Loop" was used as the ending theme for the first season of Tsubasa Chronicle.

== Single track listing ==
CD (VICL-35791)
No.	Title	Lyrics	Music	Length
1.	""Loop" (ループ, Rūpu)"	h's	h-wonder	5:24
2.	""High Touch" (ハイタッチ, Hai Tacchi)" (Tsubasa Chronicle 2nd series insert song)	Maaya Sakamoto	Takeshi Nakatsuka	3:42
3.	""Loop (w/o Maaya)" (ループ (w/o Maaya), Rūpu (uisuauto Māya))" (Instrumental)		h-wonder	5:24
4.	""High Touch (w/o Maaya)" (ハイタッチ (w/o Maaya), Hai Tacchi (uisuauto Māya))" (Instrumental)		Takeshi Nakatsuka	3:40
Total length:				18:08

== Charts ==
Chart	Peak position	Sales
Oricon Weekly Singles	7	42,446
