= Easy Listening (Maaya Sakamoto EP) =

EP by Maaya Sakamoto
- Released: August 8, 2001
- Studio: Soundcity Studio
- Genre: Electronic music; alternative pop; pop rock; R&B
- Length: 35:30
- Language: Japanese
- Label: Victor Entertainment
- Producer: Hog

Maaya Sakamoto chronology
Lucy (2001)	Easy Listening (2001)	Single Collection+ Nikopachi (2003)

Easy Listening (Japanese: イージーリスニング, Hepburn: Ījī Risuningu) is the first extended play by Japanese voice actress and singer Maaya Sakamoto, released on August 8, 2001, by Victor Entertainment.

== Background and release ==
Easy Listening was produced almost concurrently with Sakamoto's third studio album Lucy. While Sakamoto described Lucy as a "snapshot" of herself at the time, as well as representing the "orthodox 'Maaya Sakamoto' path," for Easy Listening she sought an experimental departure from a wholly different viewpoint, deliberately adopting a different persona for it. Created in collaboration with composer Yoko Kanno, on this album Sakamoto aimed to present a side of herself compared to her previous works, marking her first conceptual album.

The album centered on the concept of "listen at ease", with Sakamoto imposing strict self-imposed rules to explore new creative boundaries. Since the beginning of the project, Sakamoto set "a huge number of conditions" in mind, such as expressly avoiding an immature sound. On the other hand, she avoided her signature acoustic sound, which had characterized her music up to that date, in favor of beat-driven tracks. She described the process as learning to "work freely inside the rules I myself had set up." The cover artwork features a cage, symbolizing a bird allowed to fly only within defined bounds—a metaphor for the album's constrained yet liberating creative framework.

On the album, both Sakamoto and Kanno chose to present themselves as different personas, crediting themselves in katakana instead of using their names in kanji. (Note: On the album, both Maaya Sakamoto and Yoko Kanno's names are credited as "サカモトマーヤ" and "カンノヨウコ", with their names written in katakana, as opposed to their actual names in kanji, "坂本真綾 and "菅野よう子".) Sakamoto commented that this was a subtle distance that allowed her to write more boldly than usual. For example, she noted that she would have found it embarrassing to include such passionate love songs on her standard albums, but the katakana pseudonym served as a "mask" that enabled freer expression. Sakamoto believed the approach also granted Kanno greater creative liberty. On the other hand, the album's production was credited to the collective 'Hog,' a name invented by Kanno. 'Hog' was officially described as the people behind the album's sound and visuals, which included designing the television commercial, make-up artists, stylists, and arrangers behind the album.

== Critical reception ==
Easy Listening received praise from critics. Makiko Nakamichi of Newtype described Sakamoto as a "gemstone" that gained brilliance through new encounters, expressing joy at discovering "yet another new sparkle" in her through the album. Tetsuya Yamaguchi of Pia Magazine described it as "A pop work of such high quality that you can’t help but get absorbed in it." Kyoko Inoue of What's In contrasted the album with Sakamoto's previous work Lucy, which she found warm and approachable. She described Easy Listening as giving an "aloof impression"—like someone saying, “I don’t really need you to pay that much attention to me”—yet noted its rich tones irresistibly draw the ear, ultimately leaving her "completely taken in" just as with Lucy.

== Commercial performance ==
Easy Listening debuted at number 12 on the Oricon Weekly Albums chart, selling 21,290 copies on its first week. The album charted for three weeks, with reported sales totaling 32,060 copies.

== Track listing ==
All lyrics are written by Maaya Sakamoto, except where noted; all music is composed by Yoko Kanno

Easy Listening track listing
No.	Title	Lyrics	Length
1.	"Inori"		5:21
2.	"Blind Summer Fish"		3:54
3.	"Doreddo 39"		4:33
4.	"Afternoon Repose"	Shanti Snyder	5:59
5.	"Bitter Sweet"		5:14
6.	"Another Grey Day in the Big Blue World"	Chris Mosdell	5:02
7.	"Birds"		5:31
Total length:			35:30

== Personnel ==
Credits adapted from the liner notes of Easy Listening.

- Maaya Sakamoto – vocals, backing vocals
- Hog – production
- Kenji Fujii – guitars
- Mataro Misawa – percussion
- Tomofumi Satoshi – oboe
- Shoji Togame – clarinet
- Keishi Urata – synthesizer manipulation
- Seiichi Takubo – synthesizer manipulation assistant
- Shanti Snyder – humming
- Masashi Yabuhara – recording, mixing engineer
- Sheela-e – assistant engineer
- Ted Jensen – mastering

== Charts ==
Chart performance for Easy Listening
Chart (2001)	Peak position
Japanese Albums (Oricon)	12
