= Yūnagi Loop =

Studio album by Maaya Sakamoto
- Released: October 26, 2005
- Studio: Victor Studio; Studio Blan; Zaq Studio; others
- Genre: J-pop; soft pop; pop rock; bossa nova
- Length: 55:24
- Language: Japanese
- Label: Victor Entertainment
- Producer: Mitsuyoshi Tamura; Maaya Sakamoto

Maaya Sakamoto chronology
Shōnen Alice (2003)	Yūnagi Loop (2005)	30Minutes Night Flight (2007)

Singles from Yūnagi Loop
- 1. "Loop" Released: May 10, 2005

Yunagi Loop (Japanese: 夕凪LOOP, Hepburn: Yūnagi Rūpu; lit. 'Evening Calm Loop') is the fifth studio album by Japanese voice actress and singer Maaya Sakamoto, released on October 26, 2005, by Victor Entertainment.

== Background and release ==
Recorded when Sakamoto was twenty-five years old, the album marks a major turning point in her career as it is the first not to be fully produced by longtime collaborator Yoko Kanno, who had overseen all of her previous releases since her 1996 debut. Instead, Sakamoto worked with a variety of producers, arrangers, and engineers, creating the album one song at a time. She described the album as a condensed portrait of her then self: open, fearless, and shaped by new encounters that drew out previously unknown facets of her artistry.

The decision to collaborate with multiple creators stemmed from a growing awareness of dependency within her long-standing team, which had felt like family since she was fifteen. Sakamoto's partnership with Kanno spanned eight years, from her debut single to her album Shōnen Alice. The shift away from Kanno's sole production was described by Sakamoto as a natural progression rather than a deliberate break. She commented: "It wasn’t like 'I want to go solo!' or what we fought [...] It just felt like a natural part of the flow, and suddenly the timing came [...] It was not just me, I think Kanno-san felt the same moment too. Like, “Maybe it is time to go on a journey.”

Approaching her tenth anniversary in the industry while still only 25, Sakamoto sought to explore untapped possibilities in her singing and confront her introverted tendencies. "Facing the parts I’d avoided became a theme," she stated, likening the process to embarking on a journey of adventure and challenge. That journey began with “Loop” in May 2005, which became Sakamoto's first single to be produced by someone other than Kanno. For Sakamoto, the change was both liberating and revealing. Working with Kanno had trained her in high-speed, intuitive creation—memorizing melodies on the spot as she played the piano, recording harmonies instantly. This foundation allowed her to adapt smoothly to new collaborators, even as she navigated the challenges of starting from scratch with each one. Sakamoto described Kanno as a life mentor during her teenage years, exerting a profound influence that remained unchanged. Their bond allowed communication without words, creating a reassuring comfort, yet Sakamoto later recognized how this had fostered complacency and personal reliance over eight years, revealing those years had forged her own distinctive style. According to Sakamoto, this foundation enabled her to adapt to new collaborators. Despite her self-admitted shyness, she embraced the challenge of starting fresh with each producer, beginning every session by introducing herself; she viewed the process as an opportunity to overcome personal limitations and rediscover herself as a vocalist.

Composers involved on the album included H-Wonder (who handled "Loop"), former Flying Kids member Takashi Hamazaki, Ryosuke Nakanishi, and Shusui from canna; lyricists include Sakamoto herself, Haruichi Shindō (under his pseudonym 'H's'), Shōko Suzuki, Yuho Iwasato, among others. Unlike previous albums built on unspoken understanding with Kanno, Yūnagi Loop required active communication. Sakamoto selected tracks from demos, wrote lyrics based on melodies, and shaped arrangements through direct dialogue with arrangers. Some contributors wrote multiple songs, allowing deeper creative relationships to develop. Her ability to memorize and sing harmony parts instantly—honed under Kanno's methods—impressed new collaborators and ensured smooth recording sessions. Sakamoto noted a shift from the tension of past albums, where she carried an "honor-student mentality" and pressure to conform, to a more neutral vocal presence achieved by relinquishing self-imposed frameworks and allowing collaborators to draw out unfamiliar sides of her.

The album's thematic core emerged during a photoshoot in Scotland for Shōnen Alice. Standing amid a 360-degree horizon, Sakamoto realized: “You don’t have to come this far. Even in the middle of Tokyo, you can feel a connection to a much wider world.” She wanted to capture that sense of stillness—moments when time stops, when everyday life reveals vast inner space. Musically, the album reflects her newfound openness. No longer bound by a single producer's vision, Sakamoto explored diverse sounds while retaining her signature clarity and emotional precision. Some collaborators contributed multiple tracks, allowing deeper creative bonds to form. As for the album's lyrics, Sakamoto commented that she wanted to focus on sincerity—translating the feelings and images evoked by each melody into words without pretense. The result is a collection of songs that feel close, relatable, and deeply personal: the “ordinary 25-year-old me,” as she defined it. Sakamoto also deliberately sought lyrics from other writers that differed from her own biased style, requesting flavors she could not produce herself. While past albums saw her adapting external lyrics to fit her persona, this time she focused on self-exploration, intentionally embracing styles and themes she had previously avoided.

According to Sakamoto, the album title aims to convey the idea of a momentary stillness, represented by the word Yūnagi (夕凪, lit. 'evening calm') nestled inside life's continuous cycles (loops)—from the planetary to the personal ("within the countless daily loops, the sudden moment the wind stops"). Sakamoto used it to express her then standpoint in life: a serene pause where she could observe both the overwhelming motion of the world and the tender repetition of everyday human connections.

The album was released in a standard edition and a limited first-press edition, the latter including a CD-ROM which contained the video clips for "Loop" and "Honey Come."

== Critical reception ==
CD Journal described Yūnagi Loop as a "masterpiece" in which Sakamoto reveals the hidden emotions within her, marking her departure from Yoko Kanno's production toward a deliberate pursuit of a more “refined pop” sound. The review praised the album's "meticulously crafted and sparkling arrangements," over which Sakamoto's airy yet subtly melancholic vocals glide with buoyant ease.

== Commercial performance ==
Yūnagi Loop debuted at number 8 on the Oricon Weekly Albums chart, selling 32,070 copies on its first week. The album charted for six weeks, with reported sales totaling 45,552 copies.

== Track listing ==
Yūnagi Loop track listing
No.	Title	Lyrics	Music	Arrangement	Length
1.	"Hello"	Maaya Sakamoto	Shusui; Robin Fredriksson; Ola Larsson; Fredeik Hult	Ryosuke Nakanishi	5:18
2.	"Honey Come" (ハニー・カム)	Takashi Hamazaki	H-Wonder	H-Wonder	4:50
3.	"Loop" (ループ)	H's	H-Wonder	H-Wonder	5:24
4.	"Wakaba" (若葉, lit. 'New Leaves')	Sakamoto	Shusui	Nakanishi	5:23
5.	"Paprika" (パプリカ)	Yuho Iwasato	Takeshi Nakatsuka	Nakatsuka	3:54
6.	"My Favorite Books"	H's	Ryō Yoshimata	Yoshimata	4:20
7.	"Tsuki to Hashirinagara" (月と走りながら , lit. 'While Running with the Moon')	Hamazaki	Hamazaki	Hamazaki	3:54
8.	"No Fear/Aisuru Koto" (NO FEAR／あいすること, lit. 'No Fear/To Love')	Shōko Suzuki	Suzuki	Suzuki	4:12
9.	"Unison" (ユニゾン)	Yuho Iwasato	Shusui	Nakanishi	5:41
10.	"Fuyu Desu ka" (冬ですか, lit. 'Is It Winter?')	Sakamoto	H-Wonder	H-Wonder	4:55
11.	"Yūnagi Loop" (夕凪LOOP)	Sakamoto	Nakatsuka	Nakatsuka	4:55
12.	"A Happy Ending"	Sakamoto	Suzuki	Suzuki	2:55
Total length:					55:41

Yūnagi Loop - limited edition bonus CD-ROM
No.	Title	Length
1.	"Honey Come" (Music Video)
2.	"Loop" (Music Video)

== Personnel ==
Credits adapted from the liner notes of Yūnagi Loop.

- Maaya Sakamoto – lead vocals, backing vocals (all), theremin (9), lyrics (1, 4, 9–12), producer

Musicians

- Ryōsuke Nakanishi – arrangement, programming, manipulation (1, 4, 9)
- H-Wonder – composition, arrangement, programming, manipulation (2, 3, 10)
- Takeshi Nakatsuka – composition, arrangement, programming, manipulation (5, 11)
- Ryo Yoshimata – composition, arrangement, programming, manipulation, piano (6)
- Takashi Hamazaki – lyrics, composition, arrangement (7); lyrics (2); guitars (7)
- Shōko Suzuki – lyrics, composition, arrangement, piano, keyboards (8, 12); backing vocals (8, 12)
- Shusui – songwriting (1, 4, 9)
- Yuho Iwasato – lyrics (5, 9)
- H's – lyrics (3, 6)
- Robin Fredrikson – composition (1)
- Ola Larsson – composition (1)
- Fredrik Hult – composition (1)
- Yoshihiko Chino – guitar (1, 4)
- Kenji Suzuki – guitar (2, 3)
- Koichiro Tashiro – acoustic guitar (5)
- Yoshiaki Kanoh – guitar (6)
- Taiji Sato – guitars, backing vocals (7)
- Keiichi Takahashi – guitar (9)
- Naoki Hayashibe – guitar (10)
- Kensuke Okuda – guitar (11)
- Hiroshi Sawada – bass (11)
- Yūji Hirayama – bass (2)
- Chiharu Mikuzuki – bass (3)
- Kiyofumi Onoda – bass (6)
- Ryo Nakagawa – bass (7)
- Tomohito Aoki – wood bass (10)
- Kenji Kawagoe – drums (6)
- Hideaki Sakai – percussion, backing vocals (7)
- Tōru Hasebe – drums (10)
- Kiyoshi Kamada – drums (11)
- Naoto Strings – strings (1)
- Violin: Naoto Takahashi
- Osamu Iyoku – violin (1)
- Yu Manabe – violin (1)
- Mikiko Ise – violin (1)
- Shōko Miki – viola (1)
- Kaori Banba – viola (1)
- Daisuke Kitaguchi – cello (1)
- Kana Moriya – cello (1)
- Gen Ittetsu Group – strings (6)
- Gen Ittetsu – violin (6)
- Maki Nagata – violin (6)
- Crusher Kimura – violin (6)
- Daisuke Kadowaki – violin (6)
- Yu Manabe – viola (6)
- Takuya Mori – viola (6)
- Masami Horisawa – cello (6)
- Kaori Morita – cello (6)
- Ayako Himata – violin (4, 9)
- Yoshinari Takegami – saxophone (10)
- Eric Miyashiro – trumpet (10)
- Eijiro Nakagawa – trombone (10)
- Takahiro Iida – synthesizer manipulation (12)

Production

- Mitsuyoshi Tamura – producer
- Naoki Ibaraki – mixing (1), recording (1)
- Masayuki Nakahara – recording, mixing (2, 3, 10)
- Seiji Sekine – recording, mixing (4, 7–9, 12)
- Yoichi Kuzushima – recording, mixing (5, 11)
- Haruhiko Sato – recording, mixing (6)
- Shigeo Miyamoto – mastering
- Kohji Satoh – coordination (3)
- Haruka Cho – coordination (5, 11)
- Hideki Kawaguchi – artist management
- Yukako Inoue – A&R
- Miyuki Umeda – studio coordination
- Shiro Sasaki – executive producer
- Teruo Saegusa – executive producer
- Hiroshi Inami – executive producer

== Charts ==
Chart performance for Yūnagi Loop
Chart (2005)	Peak position
Japan (Oricon)	8
