= Maaya Sakamoto =

Japanese voice actress (born 1980)

- 坂本 真綾
- Born: March 31, 1980 (age 46); Itabashi, Tokyo, Japan
- Education: Toyo University
- Occupations: Actress; voice actress; singer
- Years active: 1988–present
- Agent: Fortunerest
- Spouse: Kenichi Suzumura (m. 2011)
- Children: 1
- Musical career
- Genres: J-pop; anime song
- Instruments: Vocals; guitar; piano; melodica
- Years active: 1996–present
- Labels: FlyingDog; Victor

Japanese name
- Kanji: 坂本 真綾
- Hiragana: さかもと まあや
- Katakana: サカモト マアヤ
Transcriptions
- Romanization: Sakamoto Maaya
- Website: www.jvcmusic.co.jp/maaya/

Maaya Sakamoto (坂本 真綾, Sakamoto Maaya; born March 31, 1980) is a Japanese actress and singer. She made her debut as a voice actress in 1992 as the voice of Chifuru in the anime Little Twins, and became known as the voice of Hitomi Kanzaki in The Vision of Escaflowne. Other major anime roles include Shinobu Oshino in Monogatari, Haruhi Fujioka in Ouran High School Host Club, Shiki Ryōgi in The Garden of Sinners, Ciel Phantomhive in Black Butler, Crona in Soul Eater, Leila Malcal in Code Geass: Akito the Exiled, Motoko Kusanagi in Ghost in the Shell: Arise, Merlin in The Seven Deadly Sins, Eto in Tokyo Ghoul, and Echidna in Re:Zero − Starting Life in Another World. In video games, she has voiced Aerith Gainsborough in the Compilation of Final Fantasy VII series, Aigis in Persona 3, Lightning in the Final Fantasy XIII games, the adult Sherry Birkin in Resident Evil, and Maki Harukawa in Danganronpa V3: Killing Harmony. In the Japanese-dubbed versions of international films, Sakamoto has voiced Padmé Amidala in the Star Wars franchise and Rosalina in The Super Mario Galaxy Movie.

Sakamoto has performed songs in both English and Japanese. She released her debut single, "Yakusoku wa Iranai", in collaboration with Yoko Kanno under Victor Entertainment on April 24, 1996. Her singles "Tune the Rainbow", "Loop", "Ame ga Furu", and "Triangler" have all reached the top 10 Oricon singles chart: "Triangler" in particular charted at number 3 and remained charting for 26 weeks. Her albums have had similar success, with Shōnen Alice and Yūnagi Loop both reaching the top 10 Oricon albums chart; and her album You Can't Catch Me, released on January 12, 2011, became her first release to ever reach number 1. She held a concert at the Nippon Budokan on her 30th birthday.

== Career ==
Born in Tokyo, Sakamoto grew up in a family, formed by her parents and older brother. She started working as a voice actress at an early age and the first leading role she was given was in the 1993 OVA Little Twins.

In 1996, she was given the role of Hitomi Kanzaki, the leading role in the TV anime series The Vision of Escaflowne. For this anime she also performed the opening theme, which was released as her debut single on April 24, 1996. The single was produced by Yoko Kanno, who was also in charge of the soundtrack for Escaflowne. Her first album, Grapefruit, was released on April 23, 1997.

Sakamoto's early music was produced by Kanno and her team, which included Yūho Iwasato, Shanti Snyder and Tim Jensen. Sakamoto worked almost exclusively with Kanno and company for almost a decade. Apart from her work as a voice actress and singer, in October 1996 Sakamoto also debuted as a radio host presenting her own program, Sakamoto Maaya no Naisho-banashi, on radio station Nack 5.

In addition to her work as an Anime Seiyuu, Sakamoto performed the dub voice for many Hollywood actresses, such as Anna Chlumsky in My Girl (Note: For 1994 TV Asahi Broadcast Version, the Macaulay Culkin role was dubbed by Yū Hayashi.), Anna Paquin in Amistad and True Blood, Claire Danes in William Shakespeare's Romeo + Juliet, (Note: For Theatrical and Fox Video Release as well as 2000 TV Asahi Broadcast Version.) and Christina Ricci in Casper (Note: For 1998 Nippon TV Broadcast Version.). Furthermore, Sakamoto also performed theme songs for several anime series, including "Gift" for Clamp School Detectives (1997), "Kiseki no Umi" for Record of Lodoss War: Chronicles of the Heroic Knight (1998) and "Platinum" for Cardcaptor Sakura (1999), which won the Best Theme Song awards from Anime Grand Prix for two consecutive years.

In 2002, Sakamoto worked again with Kanno and Yūho Iwasato for her 10th single, "Hemisphere", the opening theme for the TV anime series RahXephon. Released on February 21, 2002 (Note: "Hemisphere" release one day after the release of the "Sōda! We're Alive" by Morning Musume, the fourth single from the group's fourth studio album "4th Ikimashoi!".), "Hemisphere" peaking at number 22 in the Oricon and number 24 in the Count Down TV weekly charts.

In 2003, Sakamoto made her debut as a theatre actress on the Japanese version of the musical Les Misérables, playing the role of Éponine. This year she also starred in her first TV drama Suekko Chounan Ane San-nin, and also played the leading role in the short film 03† directed by Hidenori Sugimori. On the other hand, Sakamoto's 11th single "Tune the Rainbow" (Released on April 2, 2003), which was used as the main theme song for RahXephon: Pluralitas Concentio, The only anime movie that was nominated for the 35th Seiun Award for Best Dramatic Presentation. (Note: losing to The Lord of the Rings: The Two Towers.) became her first Top 10 single in Japan, peaking at number 9 in the Oricon weekly charts. Her fourth album, Shōnen Alice, released on December 10, 2003, became her first Top 10 album on the Oricon charts and also her last record to be produced exclusively by Yoko Kanno; since this release Sakamoto would involve further in the music making process and production of her records. Her fifth album, Yūnagi Loop, released on October 26, 2005, was her first co-produced by herself along with musician Mistuyoshi Tamura, whom she would continue working in her subsequent records. This album's only single, "Loop" the ending theme for TV anime series Tsubasa Chronicle peaked at number seven on the Oricon charts, also becoming her highest chart peaking single at that time. For this album's, Sakamoto has collaborated with many various well-known lyricist and composers, including Yūho Iwasato, Haruichi Shindō, Robin Fredriksson (Note: Fredriksson was subsequently work with artist such as Carly Rae Jepsen, Taylor Swift, Gwen Stefani, Imagine Dragons and OneRepublic as Mattman & Robin.) and Shusui. (Note: Shusui was previously work with artist such as KinKi Kids, Kyoko Fukada, Tackey & Tsubasa, Nami Tamaki and Arashi.)

In 2008, Sakamoto worked once again with Kanno for her 15th single, "Triangler", which was used as opening theme for the TV anime series Macross Frontier. "Triangler" became a big hit, peaking at the Top 3 single of the Oricon charts. The single ended up becoming Sakamoto's biggest selling single to date, with more than 90,000 copies sold. The song was later included in Sakamoto's sixth album, Kazeyomi, which was released in January 2009 and also peaked within the Top 3. For promoting this album, Sakamoto began her first low-scale national tour, on which she held three concerts in Nagoya, Osaka and Tokyo. The tour was later released as her first live DVD on August 11, 2011.

In 2010, Sakamoto celebrated her 15th anniversary in the entertainment industry, releasing on her 30th birthday her greatest hits album Everywhere, and also holding a concert at the Nippon Budokan. also in 2010, Sakamoto played the role of Ritsuko Nonomura in Japanese musical adaption of the South Korean movie A Moment to Remember, (Note: based on the 2001 Yomiuri TV-Nippon TV dorama Pure Soul.) along with Rina Chinen and Rina Uchiyama. In 2011, her seventh album, You Can't Catch Me, became her first album to reach the first stop of the Oricon charts.

Her 2012 Mitsubachi tour concluded with an announcement at her New Year's Eve concert of a new full-length album of songs written and composed solely by Sakamoto, as well as a short concert tour to support it. The album, titled Singer Song Writer, featured two new versions of Sakamoto's previous compositions "Everywhere" and "Chikai", as well as eight original tracks.

On September 25, 2017, the NHK Anime World website revealed that Sakamoto would perform "Clear" (Sakamoto 27th single, Released on January 31, 2018), the opening song for the anime adaptation of Cardcaptor Sakura: Clear Card. Sakamoto and Yoshiki Mizuno from Ikimonogakari co-written the song's lyrics, while music arrangement was arranged by Shin Kono. (Note: Kōno Composition credits include Crying Out Love, In the Center of the World, Journey Under the Midnight Sun, Iryū: Team Medical Dragon and Jūhan Shuttai!, Kōno also previously arrangement songs for J-Pop Artist such as Aco, Crystal Kay, Chemistry and Rip Slyme.)

== Collaborations ==
Sakamoto first worked with the composer Yoko Kanno in her 1996 debut single, "Yakusoku wa Iranai" ("Promises Not Needed"), which was used as the opening theme for the anime series The Vision of Escaflowne. Kanno collaborated with Sakamoto up until her fifth album, Yūnagi Loop, which has no songs composed by Kanno. Sakamoto also performed three songs for the series Wolf's Rain, for which Kanno was the composer: "Gravity" (which is sung completely in English), "Tell Me What The Rain Knows" (with lyrics by Chris Mosdell) and "Cloud 9". She performed "Hemisphere", the opening theme of the series RahXephon, as well as two songs for the series' theatrical version RahXephon: Pluralitas Concentio: "Tune the Rainbow" and "The Garden of Everything" (duet with Steve Conte). In 2008, Sakamoto and Kanno collaborated again for "Triangler", the opening theme song for the series Macross Frontier. She also performed the song "cream" with HIDE, which was featured in the Ghost in the Shell: Stand Alone Complex mini album be Human. She was one half of the voice acting duo Whoops!!, alongside Chieko Higuchi.

== Personal life ==
Sakamoto graduated from Toyo University with a Bachelor's degree in sociology in 2002. On August 8, 2011, she married the voice actor and her frequent co-star Kenichi Suzumura. On April 21, 2022, the couple announced the birth of their first child.

== Filmography ==
=== Animation ===
List of voice performances in animation
Year	Title	Role	Notes	Source
1992	Little Twins	Chifuru	Debut role OVA	
1996	The Vision of Escaflowne	Hitomi Kanzaki	First major voice role	
1996	Mizuiro Jidai	Natsumi Kugayama		
1998	El-Hazard: The Alternative World	Qawool Towles		
1998	Record of Lodoss War: Chronicles of the Heroic Knight	Leaf		
1998	Cowboy Bebop	Stella Bonnaro		
1998	Nightwalker: The Midnight Detective	Riho Yamazaki		
1999	Medabots	Karin Juniei		
1999	Omishi Magical Theater: Risky Safety	Moe Katsuragi		
2000	Ghost Stories	Miyuki Watanabe		
2001	Geneshaft	Beatrice Ratio		
2001	Case Closed	Yuki Takeno	Ep. 249–50	
2001	Kokoro Library	Tamaon 珠音		
2001	Hellsing Ultimate	Rip van Winkle	OVA	
2002	RahXephon	Reika Mishima		
2002	Kanon	Mishio Amano		
2002	.hack//Sign	Aura		
2002	Daigunder	Betty		
2002	Jing: King of Bandits	Mimosa		
2002	Petite Princess Yucie	Aries		
2002	Ghost in the Shell: Stand Alone Complex	Young Motoko Kusanagi		
2002	Naruto	Matsuri		
2002	Barom One	Noriko Kido		
2003	Wolf's Rain	Hamona		
2003	Heat Guy J	Princess		
2003	.hack//Legend of the Twilight	Aura		
2004	Kita e. Pure Session	Tanya Lipinsky	OVA	
2004	Fantastic Children	Mel		
2004	Mobile Suit Gundam Seed Destiny	Lunamaria Hawke		
2004	Black Jack	Yuko Mizuhara		
2004	Diebuster	Lal'c Melk Mark	OVA	
2005–06	Tsubasa: Reservoir Chronicle series	Tomoyo		
2005	Fushigiboshi no FutagoHime	Ballerina Fairy		
2005	Final Fantasy VII: Advent Children	Aerith Gainsborough	OVA	
2005	Mushishi	Amane	Ep. 25	
2006	Ouran High School Host Club	Haruhi Fujioka		
2006	Binbō Shimai Monogatari	Kyō Yamada		
2006	Death Note	Kiyomi Takada		
2006	D.Gray-man	Lou Fa 蝋花		
2006	Kanon	Mishio Amano	2006 TV series	
2007	Naruto Shippuden	Matsuri		
2007	Bamboo Blade	Rin Suzuki		
2007	Nasu: A Migratory Bird with Suitcase	Hikaru Toyoki	OVA	
2008	Gunslinger Girl -Il Teatrino-	Elizaveta		
2008	Fist of the North Star: The Legends of the True Savior: Legend of Toki	Rin	OVA	
2008	Macross Frontier	Ranshe Mei		
2008	Duel Masters Cross	Shizuka シズカ		
2008	Soul Eater	Crona		
2008–09	Birdy the Mighty: Decode series	Sayaka Nakasugi		
2008	Takane no Jitensha	Takane Takasumi		
2008	Sands of Destruction	Morute Urshela		
2008	Blade of the Immortal	Machi		
2008–14	Black Butler series	Ciel Phantomhive	Also Book of Circus	
2009	Canaan	Alphard Al Sheya		
2009	Kenomoto no Chat	Chacha Kenomoto	OVA	
2010	Cobra the Animation	Secret シークレット		
2010	Arakawa Under the Bridge series	Nino		
2010	The Tatami Galaxy	Akashi		
2010	Star Driver	Sarina Endō		
2011	Suzy's Zoo: Daisuki! Witzy	Narrator		
2011	Appleseed XIII	Deunan Knute	Multi-platform release	
2011	Marvel Anime: Blade	Makoto		
2011	Bunny Drop	Masako		
2011	Tiger & Bunny	Tomoe Kaburagi		
2011	Last Exile: Fam, The Silver Wing	Roshanak Babar		
2011	Black Jack Chart XI: Visited Memories	Yurie Saionji 西園寺ゆりえ	OVA	
2012–24	Monogatari series	Shinobu Oshino; Kiss-shot Acerola-orion Heart-under-blade; Princess Acerola	Starting from Nisemonogatari, including OVAs, ONAs and films	
2012	Psycho-Pass	Rikako Ōryō		
2013–14	Ghost in the Shell: Arise	Motoko Kusanagi	OVA series Also anime shorts in 2014	
2013	Coppelion	Shion Ozu		
2013	Magi: The Kingdom of Magic	Scheherazade		
2014	World Conquest Zvezda Plot	Kaori Hayabusa		
2014	Captain Earth	Moco		
2014–15	Alice in Borderland	Saori Shibuki	OVA	
2014–21	The Seven Deadly Sins series	Merlin	Episode 20 - Debut	
2015	Tokyo Ghoul √A	Eto, others		
2015	The Heroic Legend of Arslan	Farangis		
2015	Ghost in the Shell: Arise – Alternative Architecture	Motoko Kusanagi		
2015	Ushio and Tora	Sumako Aotsuki		
2015	God Eater	Alisa Ilynichna Omela		
2015	Go! Princess Precure	Asuka Kitakaze	Ep. 36	
2016	Osiris no Tenbin		Season 2	
2016–18	Chi's Sweet Adventure	Mother		
2016	The Great Passage	Kaguya Hayashi		
2017	Re:Creators	Magane Chikujōin		
2017	Made in Abyss	Lyza		
2017	Fate/Apocrypha	Jeanne d'Arc		
2018	Cutie Honey Universe	Honey Kisaragi/Cutie Honey		
2018	The Legend of the Galactic Heroes: Die Neue These Kaikō	Annerose von Grünewald		
2018	Sword Art Online: Alicization	Quinella/Administrator		
2019	Fruits Basket	Akito Sōma		
2019	Demon Slayer: Kimetsu no Yaiba	Tamayo		
2019	Carole & Tuesday	Crystal		
2019	To the Abandoned Sacred Beasts	Elizabeth Weezer (Arachne)		
2019	Ensemble Stars!	Anzu		
2019	BEM	Mysterious Lady		
2019	Fire Force	Sho Kusakabe		
2019	Fate/Grand Order - Absolute Demonic Front: Babylonia	Leonardo da Vinci		
2019	Stars Align	Kinuyo Kasuga		
2019	Chihayafuru 3	Haruka Inokuma		
2019	Case File nº221: Kabukicho	Irene Adler		
2020	Drifting Dragons	Ascella		
2020	Oda Cinnamon Nobunaga	Marie "Lily" Antoinette		
2020	Sing "Yesterday" for Me	Kyōko Sayama		
2020	Fruits Basket: 2nd Season	Akito Sōma		
2020	The Millionaire Detective Balance: Unlimited	Suzue Kanbe		
2020–21	Re:Zero − Starting Life in Another World	Echidna		
2021–2022	Yashahime: Princess Half-Demon	Zero / Otsuyu		
2021	Sorcerous Stabber Orphen: Battle of Kimluck	Carlotta		
2021	Pretty Boy Detective Club	Mayumi Dōjima		
2021	Battle Game in 5 Seconds	Omoto Iori		
2021	Fena: Pirate Princess	Helena		
2021	Platinum End	Mirai Kakehashi (child)		
2021	Ranking of Kings	Magic Mirror		
2021	Super Crooks	Kasey	ONA	
2022	Deaimon	Shinri Yukihira		
2022	Ultraman 2nd Season	Izumi	ONA	
2022	Tekken: Bloodline	Ling Xiaoyu	ONA	
2022	Tatami Time Machine Blues	Akashi	ONA	
2022	Arknights: Prelude To Dawn	Talulah Artorius		
2023	Trigun Stampede	Rem Saverem		
2023	Kaina of the Great Snow Sea	Amerote		
2023	The Fire Hunter	Akira		
2023–present	Fate/Grand Order: Fujimaru Ritsuka Doesn't Get It	Leonardo da Vinci	ONA	
2023	Dr. Stone: New World	Francois		
2024	Dead Mount Death Play	Saint	Ep. 24	
2024	A Condition Called Love	Tsukiha Shibamura/Shibamū		
2024	Chi's Sweet Summer Vacation	Mother	ONA	
2024–2025	Orb: On the Movements of the Earth	Rafał		
2025	Miru: Paths to My Future	Girl		
2025	The Too-Perfect Saint: Tossed Aside by My Fiancé and Sold to Another Kingdom	Fiana Isphil		
2025	Once Upon a Witch's Death	Tethys		
2025	Gnosia	Ju	Ep. 12	
2026	One Piece: Heroines	Miucha		
2026	The Ghost in the Shell	Motoko Kusanagi		

=== Film ===
List of voice performances in film
Year	Title	Role	Notes	Source
1995	Ghost in the Shell	Motoko Kusanagi (young)		
2000	Escaflowne	Hitomi Kanzaki		
2000	Cardcaptor Sakura: The Sealed Card	The Hope		
2003	RahXephon: Pluralitas Concentio	Haruka Mishima, Reika Kamina		
2005	Tsubasa Reservoir Chronicle the Movie: The Princess in the Birdcage Kingdom / xxxHOLiC Midsummer Night's Dream	Princess Tomoyo		
2006	Legend of Raoh: Chapter of Death in Love	Lin		
2007	Legend of Raoh: Chapter of Fierce Fight	Lin		
2007	The Garden of Sinners: Overlooking View	Shiki Ryōgi		
2007	The Garden of Sinners: A Study in Murder – Part 1	Shiki Ryōgi		
2007	Sword of the Stranger	Hagihime		
2008	The Garden of Sinners: Remaining Sense of Pain	Shiki Ryōgi		
2008	.hack//G.U. Trilogy	Aura		
2008	The Garden of Sinners: The Hollow Shrine	Shiki Ryōgi		
2008	Chocolate Underground	Carol Hunter		
2008	The Garden of Sinners: Paradox Spiral	Shiki Ryōgi		
2008	The Garden of Sinners: Oblivion Recording	Shiki Ryōgi		
2009	Evangelion: 2.0 You Can (Not) Advance	Mari Illustrious Makinami		
2009	The Garden of Sinners: A Study in Murder – Part 2	Shiki Ryōgi		
2009	Macross Frontier: Itsuwari no Utahime	Ranshe Mei ランシェ・メイ		
2010	Trigun: Badlands Rumble	Ameila Ann McFly		
2011	Macross Frontier: Sayonara no Tsubasa	Ranshe Mei ランシェ・メイ		
2011	Everlasting Heart	Gin-Ō-gō	live-action	
2011	Fullmetal Alchemist: The Sacred Star of Milos	Julia Crichton		
2011	Tekken: Blood Vengeance	Ling Xiaoyu		
2012	Code Geass: Akito the Exiled	Leila Malcal	Ep. 1, 5	
2012	Tiger & Bunny: The Beginning	Tomoe Kaburagi		
2012	Fuse Teppō Musume no Torimonochō	Funamushi		
2012	Evangelion: 3.0 You Can (Not) Redo	Mari Illustrious Makinami		
2013	Star Driver: The Movie	Sarina Endō		
2013	Ghost in the Shell: Arise	Motoko Kusanagi		
2013	Space Pirate Captain Harlock	Nami		
2013	The Garden of Sinners: Future Gospel	Shiki Ryōgi	Also extra chorus	
2014	Persona 3 The Movie: #2 Midsummer Knight's Dream	Aigis		
2015	Persona 3 The Movie: #3 Falling Down	Aigis		
2015	Crayon Shin-Chan: My Moving Story! Cactus Large Attack!	Carolina		
2015	Ghost in the Shell: The Movie	Motoko Kusanagi		
2016	Kizumonogatari Part 1: Tekketsu	Kiss-Shot Acerola-Orion Heart-Under-Blade		
2016	Persona 3 The Movie: #4 Winter of Rebirth	Aigis		
2016	Kizumonogatari Part 2: Nekketsu	Kiss-Shot Acerola-Orion Heart-Under-Blade		
2017	Black Butler: Book of the Atlantic	Ciel Phantomhive		
2017	Kizumonogatari Part 3: Reiketsu	Kiss-Shot Acerola-Orion Heart-Under-Blade		
2018	Bungo Stray Dogs: Dead Apple	Agatha Christie		
2018	The Seven Deadly Sins the Movie: Prisoners of the Sky	Merlin		
2019	Is It Wrong to Try to Pick Up Girls in a Dungeon?: Arrow of the Orion	Artemis		
2019	NiNoKuni	Saki, Velsa		
2019	The Legend of the Galactic Heroes: Die Neue These Seiran	Annerose von Grünewald		
2020	Fate/Grand Order: Camelot - Wandering; Agaterám	Leonardo da Vinci		
2021	Evangelion: 3.0+1.0 Thrice Upon a Time	Mari Illustrious Makinami		
2021	Fate/Grand Order: Camelot - Paladin: Agateram	Leonardo da Vinci		
2021	Words Bubble Up Like Soda Pop	Maria		
2021	The Seven Deadly Sins: Cursed by Light	Merlin		
2021	Child of Kamiari Month	Shiro		
2021	Bright: Samurai Soul	Chihaya		
2022	The First Slam Dunk	Haruko Akagi		
2023	Pretty Cure All Stars F	Cure Supreme, Prim		
2024	Kizumonogatari -Koyomi Vamp-	Kiss-shot Acerola-orion Heart-under-blade		
2024	Mobile Suit Gundam SEED Freedom	Lunamaria Hawke		
2024	Look Back	Woman from 4-koma		
2024	Acma: Game: The Final Key	Korzia	live-action	
2026	Labyrinth	Shiori's mother		
2026	Puella Magi Madoka Magica The Movie: Walpurgisnacht: Rising	Wasu		

=== Drama CD ===
List of voice performances in drama CDs
Title	Role	Notes	Source
Karakurizōshi Ayatsuri Sakon Volume 2 "AdashigaHara suicide crow hell" 人形草紙あやつり左近 第2巻「あだしが原心中鴉地獄」	Akane Kashiwazaki 柏崎茜	CD（A）	
Audio drama masterpiece election Wizard of Oz オーディオ・ドラマ名作選 オズの魔法使い	Dorothy	CD（A）	
Kanon	Mishio Amano		
M Kimi wo Tsutaete	Kaori Musashino	Radio	
Ouran High School Host Club	Haruhi Fujioka	podcast and other recordings	
Pathway for Santa Claus -Santa ga kureta okurimono-	Child		

=== Video games ===
List of voice performances in video games
Year	Title	Role	Notes	Source
1997	The Vision of Escaflowne	Hitomi Kanzaki	PS1	
1998	Panzer Dragoon Saga	Azel	Sega Saturn	
1998	Tail Concerto	Princess Terria	PS1	
1999	Kita e series	Tanya Lipinski	Dreamcast	
2000	Boku no Natsuyasumi	Moe	PS1; Also Portable in 2006	
2000–07	Kanon games	Mishio Amano		
2000	Napple Tale	Porch Arsia	Dreamcast	
2002	Kingdom Hearts	Aerith Gainsborough	PS2	
2002–03	.hack series	Natsume, Aura		
2002	Boku no Natsuyasumi 2	Patient Yasuko Sagara / hospitalization 相楽靖子／入院患者	PS2; Also Portable in 2010	
2002	Panzer Dragoon Orta	Azel	Xbox	
2003	Dead or Alive Xtreme Beach Volleyball	Lisa Hamilton	Xbox	
2003	Rahxephon: Blue Sky Fantasia	Reika Mishima	PS2	
2005	Fullmetal Alchemist 3: Kami o Tsugu Shōjo	Sophie Bergmann	PS2	
2005	Kingdom Hearts II	Aerith Gainsborough	PS2; Also Final Mix in 2007	
2005	Dead or Alive 4	La Mariposa (Lisa)	Xbox 360	
2006–07	Persona 3	Aigis	Also FES, Portable	
2006	Jeanne d'Arc	Jeanne d'Arc	PSP	
2006	Armored Core 4	Fiona Jarnefelt	PS3	
2006	Sonic the Hedgehog	Princess Elise	PS3/Xbox 360	
2007	Saint Seiya Hades: Zodiac chapter	Pandora	PS2	
2007	Ouran High School Host Club	Haruhi Fujioka	PS2	
2007	Crisis Core: Final Fantasy VII	Aerith Gainsborough	PSP	
2007	ASH: Archaic Sealed Heat	Emu	DS	
2008	Rune Factory 2	Kyle	DS	
2008	Armored Core: For Answer	Fiona Jarnefelt	PS3	
2008	God of War: Chains of Olympus	Eos エオス	PSP	
2008	Sands of Destruction	Morte Asherah	DS	
2008	Super Robot Wars Z	Lunamaria Hawke	PS3/PS4	
2008	Ace Combat 6	Matilda	Xbox 360	
2008–09	428: Shibuya Scramble	Sadaka サダカ	Wii	
2008	Suikoden Tierkreis	Marica	DS	
2008	White Knight Chronicles	Princess Cisna	PS3	
2009	Bamboo Blade ~ challenge of "it from" ~ バンブーブレード ～“それから”の挑戦～	Rin Suzuki	PSP	
2009	Final Fantasy XIII	Lightning	Android/iOS/PC/PS3/Xbox 360	
2010	Ar Tonelico Qoga: Knell of Ar Ciel	Tyria, Tokesakiria ティリア／塔ヶ崎理亜	PS3	
2010	God Eater	Alisa Ilynichna Omela	PSP; Also Burst	
2010	Dead or Alive Paradise	Lisa	PSP	
2010	White Knight Chronicles II	Queen Cisna	PS3	
2010	Fate/extra	Shiki Ryōgi	PSP	
2010	The 3rd Birthday	Aya Brea	PSP	
2011	Star Driver#Star Driver shine of tact Galactic Bishounen legend Star Driver 輝きのタクト 銀河美少年伝説	Sarina Endō	PSP	
2011	Dissidia 012 Final Fantasy	Lightning, Aerith Gainsborough	PSP	
2011	Super Robot Wars Z2: Destruction Chapter	Lunamaria Hawke	PSP	
2011	Dead or Alive: Dimensions	La Mariposa	3DS	
2011	Gundam Memories: Tatakai no Kioku ガンダムメモリーズ ～戦いの記憶～	Lunamaria Hawke ルナマリア・ホーク	PSP	
2011	Black Rock Shooter: The Game	Black Rock Shooter, White Rock Shooter	PSP	
2011	Tales of Xillia	Agria	PS3	
2011–12	Tekken Tag Tournament 2	Ling Xiaoyu	Arcade/PS3/Xbox 360/Wii U	
2011	Final Fantasy Type-0	Diva	PSP	
2011	Final Fantasy XIII-2	Lightning	Android/iOS/PC/PS3/Xbox 360	
2012	Super Robot Wars Z2: Rebirth Chapter	Lunamaria Hawke	PSP	
2012	Bakemonogatari Portable	Shinobu Oshino	PSP	
2012	Dead or Alive 5	La Mariposa	PC/PS3/Xbox 360; Also Last Round in 2015	
2012	Project X Zone	Ling Xiaoyu, Alisa Ilinichina Amiella, Aura	3DS	
2012	Tales of Xillia 2	Agria	PS3	
2013	Monster Hunter Frontier G	Utahime	PC/PS3/PS Vita/Wii U/Xbox 360	
2013	Resident Evil 6	Sherry Birkin	Special Package	
2013	Saint Seiya: Brave Soldiers	Pandora		
2013	God Eater 2	Alisa Ilynichna Omela	PSP	
2013	Lightning Returns: Final Fantasy XIII	Lightning	Android/iOS/PC/PS3/Xbox 360	
2014	Sengoku Basara 4	Ii Naotora	PS3; Also Sumeragi in 2015	
2014	Granblue Fantasy	Arulumaya, Dark Angel Olivia	Android/iOS/PC	
2014	Super Robot Wars Z3: Hell Chapter	Mari Illustrious Makinami	PS3	
2014	Persona Q: Shadow of the Labyrinth	Aigis	3DS	
2014	Persona 4: The Ultimax Ultra Suplex Hold	Aigis	PS3	
2014	Super Robot Wars OG Saga: Masō Kishin F – Coffin of the End	Premier-Zania Val Halle Vere レミア・ザニア・ヴァルハレヴィア	PS3	
2014	Fatal Frame: Maiden of Black Water	Rui Kagamiya	Wii U	
2015	Captain Earth Mind Labyrinth	Moco	PS Vita	
2015	Digimon Story: Cyber Sleuth	Kyōko Kuremi	PS4/PS Vita	
2015–17	Tekken 7	Ling Xiaoyu	Arcade/PC/PS4/Xbox One	
2014	Super Robot Wars Z3: Heaven Chapter	Lunamaria Hawke, Lal'C Mellk Mal, Mari Illustrious Makinami	PS3/PS Vita	
2015	Return to PopoloCrois: A Story of Seasons Fairytale	Pietro		
2015–16	Fate/Grand Order	Alexander, Jeanne d'Arc/Jeanne d'Arc Alter, Leonardo da Vinci, Shiki Ryōgi	Android/iOS	
2015	Dragon's Dogma Online	Pawn (Female)		
2015	Saint Seiya: Soldiers' Soul	Pandora		
2015	Arslan: The Warriors of Legend	Farangis	PS3/PS4	
2015	Project X Zone 2	Ling Xiaoyu, Alisa Ilynichna Omela, Aura	3DS	
2015	Dissidia Final Fantasy NT	Lightning	Arcade/PS4	
2016	Yakuza Kiwami	Yumi Sawamura	PS3/PS4	
2016	Zero Time Dilemma	Mira	3DS	
2016	World of Final Fantasy	Lightning	PC/PS4/PS Vita	
2017	Danganronpa V3: Killing Harmony	Maki Harukawa	PC/PS4/PS Vita	
2017	Dissidia Final Fantasy Opera Omnia	Lightning, Aerith Gainsborough	Android/iOS	
2017	Super Robot Wars V	Lunamaria Hawke, Mari Makinami Illustrious	PC/PS4/PS Vita/Switch	
2017	Mobius Final Fantasy	Lightning	Android/iOS/PC	
2017	Magia Record: Puella Magi Madoka Magica Side Story	Shinobu Oshino	Android/iOS	
2017	Itadaki Street: Dragon Quest and Final Fantasy 30th Anniversary	Lightning	PS4/PS Vita	
2017	Shin Megami Tensei: Strange Journey Redux	Zelenin	3DS	
2017	Digimon Story: Cyber Sleuth - Hacker's Memory	Kyōko Kuremi	PS4/PS Vita	
2018	Valkyria Chronicles 4	Leena "Kai" Schulen	PC/PS4/Switch/Xbox One	
2018	God Eater Resonant Ops	Alisa Ilynichna Omela	Android/iOS	
2018	Persona 3: Dancing Moon Night	Aigis	PS4/PS Vita	
2018	BlazBlue: Cross Tag Battle	Aigis	PC/PS4/Switch	
2018	Persona Q2: New Cinema Labyrinth	Aigis		
2019–20	Tales of the Rays	Alisa Ilynichna Omela, Agria	Android/iOS	
2019	Dead or Alive 6	La Mariposa	PC/PS4/Xbox One	
2019	Days Gone	Sarah Whitaker	PS4	
2019	Pachi-Slot Tekken 4	Ling Xiaoyu	Pachislot	
2019	Death Stranding	Mama	PS4	
2019	The Seven Deadly Sins: Grand Cross	Merlin	Android/iOS	
2019–21	The King of Fighters All Star	Ling Xiaoyu, Merlin	Android/iOS	
2020	Kingdom Hearts III Re Mind	Aerith Gainsborough	PS4/Xbox One	
2020	Final Fantasy VII Remake	Aerith Gainsborough	PS4	
2020	Ryū ga Gotoku Online	Yumi Sawamura	Android/iOS/PC	
2020	Final Fantasy Crystal Chronicles: Remastered Edition	Hana Kohl	Android/iOS/PS4/Switch	
2021	Fire Emblem Heroes	Erinys	Android/iOS	
2021	Rent-A-Girlfriend: Heroine All Stars	Merlin	Android/iOS	
2021	Demon Slayer: Kimetsu no Yaiba – The Hinokami Chronicles	Tamayo		
2022	Crisis Core: Final Fantasy VII Reunion	Aerith Gainsborough	PC/PS4/PS5/Switch/Xbox One/Xbox Series	
2023	Final Fantasy VII: Ever Crisis	Aerith Gainsborough	Android/iOS	
2023	Fate/Samurai Remnant	Lancer		
2024	Tekken 8	Ling Xiaoyu	PC/PS5/Xbox Series	
2024	Persona 3 Reload	Aigis	PC/PS4/PS5/Xbox One/Xbox Series	
2024	Final Fantasy VII Rebirth	Aerith Gainsborough	PS5	
2024	Demon Slayer: Kimetsu no Yaiba – Sweep the Board	Tamayo		
2024	Goddess of Victory: Nikke	Mari Makinami Illustrious	Android/iOS	
2024	Visions of Mana	Lyza	PC/PS4/PS5/Xbox Series	
2024	Sword Art Online: Fractured Daydream	Quinella/Administrator		
2025	Demon Slayer: Kimetsu no Yaiba – The Hinokami Chronicles 2	Tamayo		
2025	Final Fantasy Tactics: The Ivalice Chronicles	Flower Peddler		
2025	Digimon Story: Time Stranger	Alphamon	PC/PS5/Xbox Series	
2026	Resident Evil Requiem	Sherry Birkin	PC/PS5/Switch 2/Xbox Series	
2026	Dissidia Duellum Final Fantasy	Lightning Farron	Android/iOS	
2026	Final Fantasy Resonance	Lightning	PC/PS5/Switch/Switch 2/Xbox Series	

=== Television dramas ===
List of performances in television dramas
Year	Title	Role	Notes	Source
2003	The Eldest Boy and His Three Elder Sisters	Emi	Eps. 6–7	
2011	Ouran High School Host Club	Narrator (voice)		
2024	ACMA:GAME	Korzia (voice)		
2026	Garo: Higashi no Kairou	Aquas (voice)		

=== Commercials ===
List of voice performances in commercials
Year	Title	Role	Notes	Source
2019	The Way of the Househusband	Miku		

=== Musicals ===
- Angel Touch - Rin Otō
- Bangare - Nin Sasaki
- Daddy Long Legs ~Ashinaga Oji-san Yori~ - Jerusha Abbott
- Les Misérables (Japanese production) - Éponine Thénardier
- Letter ~ Bring to Light - Ritsuko Nonomura
- Mizuiro Jidai - Natsumi Kugayama

=== Radio ===
- Sakamoto Maaya no Vitamin M (坂本真綾のビタミンＭ) - Bay-FM
- Sakamoto Maaya Chizu to Tegami to Koi no Uta (坂本真綾 地図と手紙と恋のうた) - TBS Radio
  - Broadcast date: April 7, 2007 ~ March 28, 2009
- Konica Minolta presents Night on the Planet - Tokyo FM
- Yellow tail music tail - Tokyo FM
- Sapporo Beer Key of Dish - Tokyo FM
- Sakamoto Maaya no Naisho Hanashi (坂本真綾のナイショ話) - Nack5
- Girls' School Fantasy – NACK5
- Sakamoto Maaya I.D. (坂本真綾 I.D.) - Nack5, FM Osaka, FM Aichi
- Sakamoto Maaya no Who Is Lucy (坂本真綾のWho Is Lucy; Sakamoto Maaya's Who Is Lucy) – FM Fukuoka, Sendai City-FM, FM-Nigata, K-Mix
- Sakamoto Maaya I.D. Night Flight (坂本真綾 I.D. Night Flight) - Nack5, FM Osaka, North Wave, Cross FM
- Sakamoto Maaya no Escaflowneeyes (坂本真綾のEscaflowneeyes; Sakamoto Maaya's Escaflowneeyes) - Nippon Cultural Broadcasting
- Sakamoto Maaya no Lucy's Radio Show (坂本真綾のLucy's Radio Show; Sakamoto Maaya's Lucy's Radio Show) - Nippon Cultural Broadcasting

=== Webcast ===
- Maaya Sakamoto's Full Moon Recital Hall (September 23, October 23, November 22, December 21, 2010) -Ustream
  - reading of Japanese literary works
  - one of the special projects offered by a Japanese online magazine "Saizensen"

== Dubbing roles ==
=== Live-action ===
Title	Role	Voice dub for	Notes	Source
Heat	Lauren Gustafson	Natalie Portman	1998 TV Asahi edition	
Star Wars: Episode I – The Phantom Menace	Padmé Amidala	Natalie Portman		
Star Wars: Episode II – Attack of the Clones	Padmé Amidala	Natalie Portman		
Cold Mountain	Sara	Natalie Portman	2007 TV Tokyo edition	
Garden State	Sam	Natalie Portman		
Star Wars: Episode III – Revenge of the Sith	Padmé Amidala	Natalie Portman		
Paris, je t'aime	Francine	Natalie Portman		
Mr. Magorium's Wonder Emporium	Leslie	Natalie Portman		
My Blueberry Nights	Francine	Natalie Portman		
Black Swan	Nina Sayers	Natalie Portman		
Hesher	Nicole	Natalie Portman		
Thor	Jane Foster	Natalie Portman		
No Strings Attached	Dr. Emma K. Kurtzman	Natalie Portman		
Your Highness	Isabel	Natalie Portman		
Thor: The Dark World	Jane Foster	Natalie Portman		
Jane Got a Gun	Jane Hammond	Natalie Portman		
Jackie	Jacqueline "Jackie" Kennedy	Natalie Portman		
Song to Song	Rhonda	Natalie Portman		
Annihilation	Lena	Natalie Portman		
Avengers: Endgame	Jane Foster	Natalie Portman		
Lucy in the Sky	Lucy Cola	Natalie Portman		
Thor: Love and Thunder	Jane Foster / Mighty Thor	Natalie Portman		
Pan Am	Laura Cameron	Margot Robbie		
Z for Zachariah	Ann Burden	Margot Robbie		
Slaughterhouse Rulez	Audrey	Margot Robbie		
A Big Bold Beautiful Journey	Sarah	Margot Robbie		
6 Underground	Amelia / Five	Adria Arjona		
28 Days Later	Selena	Naomie Harris		
The Adventurers	Amber Li	Zhang Jingchu		
Agatha Christie's Poirot	Egg	Kimberley Nixon		
Agent Cody Banks	Natalie Connors	Hilary Duff		
Alice in Wonderland (1985 film)	Alice Kingsleigh	Natalie Gregory		
Alice in Wonderland (2010 film)	Alice Kingsleigh	Mia Wasikowska	2013 Fuji TV edition	
Alien: Covenant	Janet "Danny" Daniels	Katherine Waterston		
The Amateur	Sarah	Rachel Brosnahan		
Are You There God? It's Me, Margaret.	Barbara Simon	Rachel McAdams		
Bad Company	Julie Benson	Kerry Washington		
Barbie	Physicist Barbie	Emma Mackey		
Beetlejuice Beetlejuice	Lydia Deetz	Winona Ryder		
Belle	Dido Elizabeth Belle	Gugu Mbatha-Raw		
Black Adam	Adrianna Tomaz	Sarah Shahi		
Boogeyman 3	Sarah Morris	Erin Cahill		
Brilliant Legacy	Go Eun Sung	Han Hyo-joo		
Caravan of Courage: An Ewok Adventure	Cindel Towani	Aubree Miller		
Casper	Kathleen "Kat" Harvey	Christina Ricci	1998 NTV edition	
Curly Sue	Curly Sue	Alisan Porter		
Darkness Falls	Caitlin Greene	Emma Caulfield		
Death Note	Mia Sutton	Margaret Qualley		
Die Hard	Lucy McClane	Taylor Fry	1990 TV Asahi edition	
Divergent	Beatrice "Tris" Prior	Shailene Woodley		
The Divergent Series: Insurgent	Beatrice "Tris" Prior	Shailene Woodley		
The Divergent Series: Allegiant	Beatrice "Tris" Prior	Shailene Woodley		
Doctor Who	Rose Tyler	Billie Piper		
Dr. Dolittle 2	Charisse Dolittle	Raven-Symoné		
Elementary	Kitty Winter	Ophelia Lovibond		
The End of Oak Street	Denise Platt	Anne Hathaway		
The End of the Tour	Sarah	Anna Chlumsky		
ER	Charlene "Charlie" Chiemingo	Kirsten Dunst		
Fantastic Four	Sue Storm / Invisible Woman	Jessica Alba	2008 NTV edition	
The Fantastic Four: First Steps	Sue Storm / Invisible Woman	Vanessa Kirby		
Avengers: Doomsday	Sue Storm / Invisible Woman	Vanessa Kirby		
Fatal Attraction	Ellen Gallagher	Ellen Hamilton Latzen	1990 Fuji TV edition	
Fathers and Daughters	Katie Davies	Amanda Seyfried		
Final Destination 3	Julie Christensen	Amanda Crew		
Five Children and It	Athena	Jennifer Claridge		
Flight 29 Down	Taylor Hagan	Lauren Storm		
Furious 7	Ramsey	Nathalie Emmanuel		
The Fate of the Furious	Ramsey	Nathalie Emmanuel		
F9	Ramsey	Nathalie Emmanuel		
Fast X	Ramsey	Nathalie Emmanuel		
Genius	Aretha Franklin	Cynthia Erivo		
Glee	Rachel Berry	Lea Michele		
Godzilla vs. Kong	Ilene Andrews	Rebecca Hall		
Godzilla x Kong: The New Empire	Ilene Andrews	Rebecca Hall		
Grand Prince	Sung Ja-hyun	Jin Se-yeon		
Grey's Anatomy	Bonnie Crasnoff	Monica Keena	Season 3	
Hart of Dixie	Dr. Zoe Hart	Rachel Bilson		
He Got Game	Mary Shuttlesworth	Zelda Harris		
Helix	Dr. Sarah Jordan	Jordan Hayes		
High School Musical	Taylor McKessie	Monique Coleman		
High School Musical 2	Taylor McKessie	Monique Coleman		
The Hole	Elizabeth "Liz" Dunn	Thora Birch		
Hop	Sam O'Hare	Kaley Cuoco		
The Horse Whisperer	Grace MacLean	Scarlett Johansson		
Houdini & Doyle	Adelaide Stratton	Rebecca Liddiard		
House of the Dragon	Lady Alicent Hightower	Olivia Cooke		
Hunted	Sam Hunter	Melissa George		
Hwarang: The Poet Warrior Youth	Aro	Go Ara		
Independence Day: Resurgence	Patricia Whitmore	Maika Monroe		
Indiana Jones and the Dial of Destiny	Helena Shaw	Phoebe Waller-Bridge		
Inherent Vice	Sortilège	Joanna Newsom		
Iron Sky: The Coming Race	Obianaju "Obi" Washington	Lara Rossi		
Jumong	Lady Soseono	Han Hye-jin		
Jurassic Park	Lex Murphy	Ariana Richards		
L.A.'s Finest	Nancy McKenna	Jessica Alba		
Life	Dr. Miranda North	Rebecca Ferguson		
Life with Mikey	Angie Vega	Christina Vidal		
Little Fires Everywhere	Elena Richardson	Reese Witherspoon		
The Little Witch	Kleine Hexe	Karoline Herfurth		
Lost Girl	Mackenzie "Kenzi" Malikov	Ksenia Solo		
The Lucky One	Beth Green	Taylor Schilling		
Mac and Me	Debbie	Lauren Stanley		
The Man Who Cried	Suzie	Christina Ricci		
The Man Who Invented Christmas	Kate Dickens	Morfydd Clark		
Mars	Marta Kamen	Anamaria Marinca		
Masters of the Universe	Evil-Lyn	Alison Brie		
The Midnight After	Yuki	Janice Man		
Midnight Sun	Katherine Price	Bella Thorne		
A Minecraft Movie	Alex	Kate McKinnon		
MirrorMask	Helena Campbell	Stephanie Leonidas		
Monster Hunt	Pawn Shop Owner	Tang Wei		
Near Dark	Sarah Colton	Marcie Leeds		
The Nevers	Zephyr Alexis Navine / Amalia True	Laura Donnelly		
New York Minute	Jane Ryan	Ashley Olsen		
The Night House	Beth	Rebecca Hall		
The Notebook	Allison "Allie" Hamilton	Rachel McAdams		
The Nutcracker and the Four Realms	Sugar Plum Fairy	Keira Knightley		
The Odyssey	Penelope	Anne Hathaway		
Pacific Rim: Uprising	Jules Reyes	Adria Arjona		
Pan	Mary	Amanda Seyfried		
Peter Pan & Wendy	Mary Darling	Molly Parker		
Piranha 3D	Kelly Driscoll	Jessica Szohr		
Poltergeist	Dana Freeling	Dominique Dunne	1996 TV Asahi edition	
Prince of Persia: The Sands of Time	Princess Tamina	Gemma Arterton		
Ready Player One	Art3mis / Samantha Cook	Olivia Cooke		
Restless	Annabel "Annie" Cotton	Mia Wasikowska		
Romeo + Juliet	Juliet Capulet	Claire Danes		
Saaho	Amritha "Amu" Nair	Shraddha Kapoor		
The School Nurse Files	Ahn Eun-young	Jung Yu-mi		
Scream Queens	Hester Ulrich	Lea Michele		
Shameless	Fiona Gallagher	Emmy Rossum		
Silent Hill: Revelation	Heather Mason / Sharon Da Silva	Adelaide Clemens		
Since Otar Left	Marina	Nino Khomasuridze		
The Sisterhood of the Traveling Pants	Lena Kaligaris	Alexis Bledel		
The Sisterhood of the Traveling Pants 2	Lena Kaligaris	Alexis Bledel		
Snow White and the Huntsman	Snow White	Kristen Stewart		
So Little Time	Chloe Carlson	Ashley Olsen		
Step Up 3D	Natalie	Sharni Vinson		
Stoker	India Stoker	Mia Wasikowska		
Stretch	Charlie	Jessica Alba		
The Surprise	Anne de Koning	Georgina Verbaan		
Terminator: Dark Fate	Grace	Mackenzie Davis		
Tom & Jerry	Preeta	Pallavi Sharda		
Train to Busan	Seong-kyeong	Jung Yu-mi		
Transcendence	Bree	Kate Mara		
True Blood	Sookie Stackhouse	Anna Paquin		
The Vampire Diaries	Sybil	Nathalie Kelley		
Under Siege 2: Dark Territory	Sarah Ryback	Katherine Heigl	1998 TV Asahi edition	
Vicky Cristina Barcelona	Cristina	Scarlett Johansson		
War & Peace	Natasha Rostova	Lily James		
Wasabi	Yumi Yoshimido	Ryōko Hirosue	TV Tokyo edition	
Wednesday	Isadora Capri	Billie Piper		
World War Z	Segen	Daniella Kertesz		

=== Animation ===
Title	Role	Notes	Source
Barbie and the Magic of Pegasus	Barbie		
Barbie: Fairytopia	Barbie		
The Boss Baby: Family Business	Carol Templeton		
Brandy & Mr. Whiskers	Brandy Harrington		
Inside Out 2	Ennui		
Legends of Oz: Dorothy's Return	Dorothy Gale		
The Lego Movie 2: The Second Part	General Sweet Mayhem		
The Lord of the Rings: The War of the Rohirrim	Éowyn		
Sing	Rosita		
Sing 2	Rosita		
Spider-Man: Into the Spider-Verse	Lyla		
Star Wars: Clone Wars	Padmé Amidala		
Star Wars: The Clone Wars (film)	Padmé Amidala		
Star Wars: The Clone Wars (TV)	Padmé Amidala		
The Super Mario Galaxy Movie	Rosalina		
Tinker Bell	Fawn		
Tinker Bell and the Lost Treasure	Fawn		
Tinker Bell and the Great Fairy Rescue	Fawn		
Tinker Bell and the Secret of the Wings	Fawn		
Tinker Bell and the Pirate Fairy	Fawn		
Tinker Bell and the Legend of the NeverBeast	Fawn		
What If...?	Jane Foster		

== Discography ==
Studio albums

- Grapefruit (1997)
- Dive (1998)
- Lucy (2001)
- Shōnen Alice (2003)
- Yūnagi Loop (2005)
- Kazeyomi (2009)
- You Can't Catch Me (2011)
- Singer-Songwriter (2013)
- Follow Me Up (2015)
- Kyō Dake no Ongaku (2019)
- Kioku no Toshokan (2023)

== Awards and nominations ==
In the 23rd Anime Grand Prix, she ranked tenth place under the voice actress category with 126 votes.

In addition, in the first Seiyu Awards, she was nominated for "Best Actress in a leading role" for her portrayal of Haruhi Fujioka in Ouran High School Host Club as well as "Best Musical Performance" for Tsubasa Chronicle's ending theme Loop.

Year	Award	Category	Nominated work	Result	Ref.
2008	13th Animation Kobe Awards	Radio Kansai Award	"Triangler"	Won	
2013	The 38th Kazuo Kikuta Theatre Awards	Theater Award	Daddy Long Legs	Nominated	
2025	Famitsu Dengeki Game Awards 2024	Voice Acting	Final Fantasy VII Rebirth	Won	

== Publications ==
=== Serialization ===
- Sakamoto Maaya no Manpukuron (坂本真綾の満腹論) – Currently in Newtype.

- A monthly column

=== Books ===
- I.D. (アイディ。) – December 9, 2005 – Essay collection
- Chizu to Tegami to Koi no Uta (地図と手紙と恋のうた) – April 18, 2008 – Photo and lyrics book compilation
- from everywhere. – February 21, 2011 – Essay collection
