= List of Katana Maidens: Toji No Miko episodes =

- Starring: Kaede Hondo; Azumi Waki; Saori Ōnishi; Hina Kino; Eri Suzuki; Risae Matsuda
- No. of episodes: 24

Release
- Original network: AT-X, Tokyo MX, MBS, BS11
- Original release: January 5 – June 22, 2018

Katana Maidens: Toji No Miko is an anime television series, which is co-produced between Genco and Studio Gokumi. Kodai Kakimoto directed the series, while Tatsuya Takahashi is in charge of scripts and Yoshinori Shizuma is the character designer. Kaede Hondo, Saori Ōnishi, Azumi Waki, Hina Kino, Risae Matsuda and Eri Suzuki performed both the first opening theme "Save Me Save You" and the first ending theme "Kokoro no Memoria" (心のメモリア). They also performed the second opening theme "Shinkakei Colors" (進化系Colors) and the second ending theme "Mirai Epilogue" (未来エピローグ). The series aired from January 5 to June 22, 2018. It ran for 24 episodes. Crunchyroll streamed the series, while Funimation produced an English dub.

A new anime television series titled Mini Toji aired from January 5 to March 16, 2019, on AT-X, Tokyo MX, BS11, and MBS. The series is animated by Project No.9 and directed by Yuu Nobuta, with Aoi Akashiro handling the series' scripts, and Hiromi Ogata designing the characters. The opening theme is "Kono Bangumi wa Ura Wakaki Kōmuin-tachi no Teikyō de Okuri Itashimasu" (この番組はうら若き公務員たちの提供でお送りいたします, This Program is Made Possible By Young Government Workers) by Kaede Hondo and Himika Akaneya under their character names. The series ran for 11 episodes. Crunchyroll streamed the series.

== Katana Maidens ~ Toji No Miko ==
No.	(Note: All English titles are taken from Crunchyroll.)	Original air date
1	"The Point of a Sword"; Transliteration: "Kissaki no Muku Saki" (Japanese: 切っ先の向く先)	January 5, 2018
Kanami and Mai are students at Minoseki Academy, and are chosen to represent the school at a national tournament. Upon arriving at the tournament, Kanami and Mai briefly meet several students from the other participating schools, though Kanami takes a particular interest in Hiyori, as she is intrigued by her fighting style. During the tournament, Kanami, Mai, and Hiyori quickly fight their way to the top, resulting in Kanami and Hiyori reaching the final match. However, instead of battling Kanami, Hiyori instead attempts to assassinate the official observing the match, Yukari Origami. Hiyori's attempt is foiled by Yukari's bodyguards, but Kanami intervenes and both she and Hiyori escape the tournament grounds. Yukari stops her bodyguards from pursuing, letting them get away.
2	"The Distance Between Them"; Transliteration: "Futari no Kyori" (Japanese: 二人の距離)	January 12, 2018
Kanami and Hiyori run from the authorities and Hiyori questions Kanami's motives for helping her. They run and hide in the city areas, where they enjoy themselves while Mai, having gained permission from her school principal, starts searching for them using her family's resources. After an Aradama appears in the city, the pair work together to exterminate it, but are found by Mai who was also alerted to the Aradama's presence. Hiyori and Mai clash briefly before Kanami stops them, and reveals that Hiyori attacked Yukari because she believes Yukari is actually a disguised Aradama, and Kanami also glimpsed the eye and power of an Aradama when Yukari defended herself. Mai decides to let them go, and gives Kanami the cookies she left behind in the dormitory and a contact number before seeing them off.
3	"Innocent Sword"; Transliteration: "Musō no Ken" (Japanese: 無想の剣)	January 19, 2018
Kanami and Hiyori use the number that Mai had given them and are met by Rui, a former Minoseki student who agrees to help them by the request of Minoseki's headmaster, President Hashima. Rui allows Kanami and Hiyori to stay in her apartment. Meanwhile, the Sword Administration continues to investigate the situation, but Yukari refuses to mobilize the military to pursue Kanami and Hiyori. Frustrated at the apparent lack of progress, President Yukina of Renpu Academy sends Sayaka to track them down. Rui puts Kanami and Hiyori in contact with one of her online friends, who tells them to go to a specified location. Sayaka then attacks, but Kanami is able to disarm and befriend her.
4	"The Burden of Resolution"; Transliteration: "Kakugo no Omo-sa" (Japanese: 覚悟の重さ)	January 26, 2018
Kanami and Hiyori continue on their way to the meeting point, though Hiyori warns Kanami not to join her if she doesn't have the resolve to kill. They are then intercepted by Ellen and Kaoru who battle them briefly, but Kanami and Hiyori flee when Ellen and Kaoru call in their S-Equipment. Meanwhile, the Sword Administration detects the deployment of the S-Equipment, which was sent without their knowledge or permission. Suspecting the involvement of a rebel faction in the military, Yukari sends the Elite Guard to investigate. Kanami resolves to stay by Hiyori's side to protect her and prevent her from killing anybody except aradama. Hiyori reveals she knows about Yukari's true identity due to a letter from her mother, who tried to vanquish it but failed. The Elite Guard then arrives in the area, prepared to hunt down Kanami and Hiyori.
5	"A Night of Mountain Hunting"; Transliteration: "Yama Kari no Yoru" (Japanese: 山狩りの夜)	February 2, 2018
Kanami and Hiyori are approached by Ellen and Kaoru, who claim they are working for Mokusa, a faction of Toji who oppose Yukari. The battle they had was merely to test their abilities. Hiyori remains skeptical, but they are separated by an Aradama swarm. Ellen realizes that the Aradama did not appear on her electronic detection device, which is controlled by the Origami family. Meanwhile, Kanami and Hiyori are attacked by Maki and Suzuka. Kaoru is attacked by the swarm, which is revealed to be controlled by Yomi, who can release them from her body. Back at the Sword Organization, Mai meets Sayaka while Yukari promises Yume that she will arrange a fun "game" for her. Working together, Kanami and Hiyori are able to subdue Maki, giving them an opening to escape. Kaoru defeats Yomi in battle and forces her to flee, but passes out from the strain. The next morning, Ellen appears at the Elite Guard's base camp.
6	"The Space Between Humans and Disgrace"; Transliteration: "Hito to Kegare no Hazama" (Japanese: 人と穢れの狭間)	February 9, 2018
Kaoru wakes up and reunites with Kanami and Hiyori. Ellen allows herself to be captured by the Elite Guard. Suzuka interrogates Ellen, believing her to be a part of Mokusa since her grandfather is also a suspected member. Maki and Suzuka leave the camp to investigate a possible sighting of Hiyori, and Ellen takes the opportunity to escape and steal a noro syringe Yomi uses to replenish her Aradama. Yomi pursues Ellen, who is saved when Kanami, Hiyori, and Kaoru arrive to help. Yomi then injects herself with multiple noro syringes but loses control of her powers and falls unconscious. Kanami and her group escape the area via submarine.
7	"Heart Ache"; Transliteration: "Kokoro no Uzuki" (Japanese: 心の疼き)	February 16, 2018
Yukina attempts to inject Sayaka with noro in order to increase her power, but Sayaka rejects the injection. On the submarine, Kanami and Hiyori meet Richard Friedman, Ellen's grandfather and one of the leaders of Mokusa. He reveals that Hiyori's mother helped found the organization, and they first grew suspicious of Yukari when she began making sudden breakthroughs in noro research. Back in Japan, Mai receives a call from Sayaka and goes out to look for her, discovering that Sayaka fled from Yukina. Yume arrives and attacks the girls, but is forced to retreat when Yukina arrives. Sayaka calmly refuses to return to Renpu, citing how she has made friends and doesn't want to lose them by sacrificing her emotions. President Hashima arranges for Mai and Sayaka to go into hiding with Mokusa, where they are reunited with Kanami. They are then met by Richard and Mokusa's other leader, Akane Origami.
8	"Day of Disaster"; Transliteration: "Saiyaku no Hi" (Japanese: 災厄の日)	February 23, 2018
Akane explains to Kanami and her friends that twenty years ago, a massive aradama named Princess Tagitsu attacked Sagami Bay, causing great destruction. A number of Toji led by Yukari were sent to battle it. Included in the force were Kanami and Hiyori's mothers: Minato and Kagari, respectively. Yukari, Kagari, and Minato proceeded to carry out a secret technique to suppress Princess Tagitsu, and it was apparently defeated, though Kagari and Minato were heavily injured. However, Akane explains that the technique would have involved Kagari sacrificing herself to banish Princess Tagitsu to the netherworld, and their failure allowed Princess Tagitsu to possess Yukari. Kagari and Minato lost their powers and retired to start families, but the injuries they suffered shortened their lifespans and they both died young. Though Kagari and Minato failed, Akane muses that their failure led to Kanami and Hiyori being born. The next day, Kanami and her friends undergo rigorous training while the noro sample is taken to Osafune Academy for further study. Meanwhile, Yukari reveals that she has finally tracked down Akane's location.
9	"After the Festival"; Transliteration: "Matsuri no Ato" (Japanese: 祭りのあと)	March 2, 2018
After a training session, Kanami and her friends are invited to attend the village's festival, where they enjoy the festivities. Friedman explains to them that the village shrine is one of the few left in Japan that possesses noro not confiscated by the Origami family. Furthermore, he reveals that as more noro is collected together, it has a greater chance of producing a powerful and intelligent aradama. The disaster at Sagami Bay was caused by humans foolishly collecting too much noro in one place, and Mokusa fears that Yukari is deliberately gathering the noro to create another great aradama. After the festival, Sword Administration forces led by Yume arrive and raid the village, though Yume begins coughing blood despite defeating many Mokusa toji. Kanami's group are able to evacuate with Friedman and Akane but many of Mokusa's toji are left behind and captured.
10	"Resolve for Tomorrow"; Transliteration: "Ashita e no Ketsui" (Japanese: 明日への決意)	March 9, 2018
Yukari continues her attack on Mokusa by raiding Minoseki, Osafune, and Heijou academies, arresting the directors, and disarming their toji. Meanwhile, Yukari goes to her stockpile of noro and lets it engulf her. In the submarine, Friedman suggests that they flee overseas to escape. However, Kanami and her friends decide to keep fighting when they're suddenly hit with an odd sensation. Friedman warns them that such a thing happened right before the appearance of Princess Tagitsu, which suggests that Yukari is attempting to summon another great aradama. Kanami and her friends decide to confront Yukari, while Akane stages a press conference to draw attention. At the bay, Akane appears before the gathered press and warns the public about the coming of the great aradama. At the same time, Kanami and her friends launch from the submarine in specialized aircraft and land at the Sword Administration headquarters. The Elite Guard scramble to respond as Kanami disembarks wearing full armor.
11	"Gleam of Moonlight"; Transliteration: "Gekka no Hirameki" (Japanese: 月下の閃き)	March 16, 2018
Kanami and her friends assault the Origami family shrine while the Elite Guard attempts to intercept them. Ellen and Kaoru team up to fight Yume, Mai and Sayaka face Yomi, and Kanami and Hiyori encounter Maki and Suzuka. Yukina arrives and tries to convince Sayaka to join her side again, but Mai refuses to let Sayaka be used as tool. Yume manages to defeat Ellen and Kaoru, but begins succumbing to her illness as she becomes obsessed with fighting Kanami. After a fierce battle, Kanami and Hiyori are able to defeat Maki and Suzuka and proceed into the shrine, and confront Yukari, who has already absorbed all of the noro and prepares to battle them.
12	"A Single Sword"; Transliteration: "Hitotsu no Tachi" (Japanese: ひとつの太刀)	March 23, 2018
Ellen and Kaoru regain consciousness and meet with Kanami and Hiyori. Working together, Mai and Sayaka are able to defeat Yomi, and Sayaka tells Yukina that she pities her before leaving to join the others. Suzuka stays behind to dispose of Yume's body before she revives as an aradama while Maki goes to find Yukari. Kanami and Hiyori begin to battle Yukari, but are clearly outmatched by Yukari and Princess Tagitsu's abilities. Kanami, seeing a weakness, manages to wound Yukari, causing her to reveal her true form as Princess Tagitsu. Mai, Sayaka, Ellen, and Kaoru arrive to join the battle against Princess Tagitsu while Maki is shocked at the revelation. During the battle, it's revealed that Kagari sacrificed herself to banish Princess Tagitsu to the netherworld, but Minato followed to rescue her. Unable to accept the loss of both of her friends, Yukari agreed to let herself be possessed by Princess Tagitsu to save them. Despite their numbers advantage, Kanami's friends are taken out one by one by Princess Tagitsu until Kanami herself is knocked out, leaving only Hiyori standing. Minato's spirit temporarily possesses Kanami's body and is able to weaken Princess Tagitsu enough to allow Hiyori to perform the banishing technique. Kanami regains consciousness just in time to pull Hiyori out of the netherworld as Princess Tagitsu is defeated. Everybody outside watches as Princess Tagitsu dissolves into blue light as Kanami and her friends lay unconscious.
12.5	"Short Version Digest"; Transliteration: "Sōshūhen Daijesuto" (Japanese: 総集編 ダイジェスト)	March 30, 2018
A recap of episodes 1 to 12.
13	"Hero of the Next Generation"; Transliteration: "Jidai no Eiyū" (Japanese: 次代の英雄)	April 6, 2018
As a result of Princess Tagitsu's defeat, her body dissolves, spreading her collected noro all over Japan and resulting in a sharp increase in the appearance of aradama. This results in the government being forced to temporarily use Toji academy students to fight the aradama. Four months later, Kanami and her friends are part of the task force battling the aradama with the exception of Hiyori, who considers retiring from being a Toji now that she's fulfilled her mother's wish. Kanami also befriends Ayumu, a student from Ayanokouji Academy. Kaoru is privately informed by Director Maniwa that a mysterious unidentified Toji is stealing noro for an unknown purpose. They confront Suzuka, suspecting the culprit may be Maki. Meanwhile, Yukina secretly continues her noro experiments on Yomi, with assistance from the president of Ayanokouji. Upon hearing about the noro thief, Hiyori decides to resume being a Toji and reunites with Kanami.
14	"Family Scene"; Transliteration: "Kazoku no Jōkei" (Japanese: 家族の場景)	April 13, 2018
Mai hears news about how more and more Toji students are being forced to transfer out of their academies by their parents due to safety concerns. Mai's own father expresses his wish to have Mai transferred out of Minoseki, to which Mai protests. Meanwhile, a mysterious Toji assists other Toji in fighting an aradama. Upon viewing a recording, Kanami believes the mysterious Toji is Maki due to her fighting style. The next day, Mai's father takes her to a lab his company is funding, where Friedman and Ellen's parents are researching ways to use noro as a power source. Ellen is also present, and confides in Mai that her father is most likely funding the research to find a way to safely neutralize noro so Mai wouldn't have to risk her life as a Toji any more. However, the noro thief arrives and steals the lab's noro, and manages to escape despite Mai and Ellen's efforts to stop her. Upon seeing Mai's determination to fight, Mai's father decides to change his mind and allow Mai to continue as a Toji. Meanwhile, it is revealed that Yukina and Yomi are working with the noro thief.
15	"Slothful Person's Honor"; Transliteration: "Namakemono no Ichibu" (Japanese: 怠け者の一分)	April 20, 2018
Kaoru is tasked with leading a squad of Toji to investigate sightings of an aradama in the forest, though she doesn't take the assignment seriously due to her lazy nature. Sayaka temporarily joins the squad, and her skills quickly win over the affection of the other squad members, including Nene, much to Kaoru's annoyance. They find the aradama in a harmless squirrel form and Sayaka prepares to destroy it. Kaoru stops her, citing how her family believes that Toji should not kill aradama that don't pose a threat, asking Sayaka if she would kill Nene simply for being an aradama. Sayaka then learns from Kaoru to think before she kills when the squirrel aradama suddenly mutates, forcing Kaoru to destroy it. After Kaoru and Sayaka leave the scene to the noro recovery team, the noro thief attacks. Maki intervenes, but cannot stop the thief from escaping. Kaoru and Sayaka return to see Maki fleeing the scene, and mistakenly believe her to be the noro thief. Despite the noro being stolen, the mission is considered successful since the aradama was destroyed with no casualties.
16	"Audience in the Prison"; Transliteration: "Rōkan no Haietsu" (Japanese: 牢監の拝謁)	April 27, 2018
Kanami and her friends celebrate Sayaka's birthday and they begin to discuss the identity of the noro thief. They talk to Akane, who confirms that the noro thief is actually Princess Tagitsu as a human-like aradama. Akane then brings Kanami and Hiyori to the Ministry of Defense, where another aradama named Princess Takiri warns them that Princess Tagitsu is already gaining strength for her next plan. Princess Takiri also requests that Princess Ichikishima be brought to her. Akane reveals to Kanami and Hiyori that Yukari had been keeping three great aradama suppressed when she was possessed, and they were all released when she was defeated, with Princess Tagitsu on the loose and Princesses Takiri and Ichikishima in government custody. Kanami and Hiyori are assigned to guard Princess Takiri when Princess Tagitsu attacks, and they are able to repel her with help from Maki. Princess Tagitsu retreats and tells Yukina that they must move ahead with their plan, while Akane warns Yukari that Princess Tagitsu knows Princess Takiri's location.
17	"The Goddesses' Madness"; Transliteration: "Joshin-tachi no Kyōsō" (Japanese: 女神たちの狂騒)	May 4, 2018
Kanami, Hiyori, Maki, and Suzuka accompany Akane to meet Yukari, who has fully recovered from her possession and is in charge of protecting Princess Ichikishima. Yukari explains that when she and Princess Tagitsu were defeated, Princess Tagitsu abandoned Yukari and split herself into three entities due to her conflicting desires. The current Princess Tagitsu wants to destroy humans, Princess Takiri wants to control and rule over humans, and Princess Ichikishima wants to combine humans and aradama to advance to the next stage in evolution. The three Princesses will battle one another and the winner would inherit their true body which still resides in the netherworld. Akane informs them that their priority now is to protect Princess Takiri. Afterwards, Yukari formally apologizes to Kanami and Hiyori about what happened to their mothers. Meanwhile, President Souraku continues to delay forming Princess Tagitsu's imperial guard due to being reluctant to recruit her own students. Later, Yomi attacks and mortally wounds several of Souraku's students, including Ayumu, which forces Souraku to inject them with noro to save their lives. Later, Souraku reluctantly forms the imperial guard, though Yukina appears unaware of what Yomi did. The imperial guard, with Ayumu among them, swear loyalty to Princess Tagitsu.
18	"Aradama Domination"; Transliteration: "Aradama no Chōryō" (Japanese: 荒魂の跳梁)	May 11, 2018
Kanami and her friends are assigned to protect Princess Takiri. However, negotiations with Princess Takiri do not go well, as she sees humans as nothing more than subjects to be ruled. Kanami suggests sparring with Princess Takiri, since she believes seeing each other face to face is the best way for humans and aradama to understand each other, but Princess Takiri refuses. Later, Nene visits Princess Takiri, who looks into Nene's memories and witnesses now Nene was tamed by and able to coexist with humans. She reconsiders her opinion about humans and agrees to spar with Kanami. However, they are interrupted when Princess Tagitsu and her imperial guard attack. The defenders are quickly overwhelmed and Princess Tagitsu absorbs Princess Takiri. Princess Tagitsu easily defeats Kanami and her friends, who are only narrowly saved by Nene transforming into his aradama form. Having achieved her objective, Princess Tagitsu retreats, and Kanami is left shocked at seeing the death of Princess Takiri as well as seeing Ayumu fighting for Princess Tagitsu.
19	"Call of the Evil God"; Transliteration: "Magagami no Yobigoe" (Japanese: 禍神の呼び声)	May 18, 2018
One week after Princess Tagitsu's attack, Kanami and her friends are shocked to see Princess Tagitsu publicly reveal her identity, claiming that the great disaster at Sagami Bay was the fault of the Toji. Yukina blackmails the government over their involvement in the disaster, forcing them into siding with Princess Tagitsu. The move splits the Sword Administration in two, with Director Maniwa leading the human faction while Yukina leads Princess Tagitsu's faction, supported by students from Ayanokouji Academy. The government then moves to apprehend Yukari and Princess Ichikishima on Princess Tagitsu's orders, but they are able to escape. Meanwhile, Kanami and her friends are called to an important mission while Yukina assembles the imperial guard to track Princess Ichikishima.
20	"The Last Goddess"; Transliteration: "Saigo no Megami" (Japanese: 最後の女神)	May 25, 2018
Kanami and her friends are sent to rescue Yukari and Princess Ichikishima as they are pursued by Yomi and the imperial guard. Meanwhile, Souraku meets with Yukari and apologizes, regretting her role in assisting Princess Tagitsu and getting her students involved. Kanami and the others arrive just in time to intercept the imperial guard, and Kanami defeats Ayumu while Maki and Suzuka defeat Yomi. Yukari and Princess Ichikishima continue to flee, with Princess Ichikishima wondering why everybody is going through such lengths to protect her when she considers her existence unnecessary. Yukari reassures her, telling her that it was thanks to Princess Ichikishima that she was able to keep her sanity while being possessed. Princess Tagitsu then attacks, and Yukari stays behind to battle her. Princess Ichikishima flees and encounters Hiyori, offering to fuse with her in order to save Yukari. With Princess Ichikishima's power, Hiyori is able to save Yukari and force Princess Tagitsu to retreat.
21	"Sword of the Thunder God"; Transliteration: "Raijin no Ken" (Japanese: 雷神の剣)	June 1, 2018
Having absorbed Princess Ichikishima and becoming part aradama, Hiyori fears losing control of her powers and flees to avoid hurting Kanami. Yukari follows Hiyori and begins to train her on how to suppress and control her aradama side. Kanami is ordered to return to the base camp where she reunites with the rest of her friends, who are then tasked to search for Hiyori. Meanwhile, Princess Tagitsu attacks Hiyori, but Hiyori is able to gain the upper hand and defeats Princess Tagitsu, absorbing her just as Kanami and the others arrive. Yukari then declares that if Hiyori cannot control the aradama, then she will banish her to the netherworld. Kanami goads Hiyori into a sword duel, with Kanami being the victor and tearfully telling Hiyori that they can work together to save her. However, Princess Tagitsu emerges from Hiyori, having faked her death, and takes the opportunity to kill and absorb Hiyori.
22	"Gate of the Netherworld"; Transliteration: "Kakuriyo no Mon" (Japanese: 隠世の門)	June 8, 2018
Having absorbed the essence of the other princesses, Princess Tagitsu begins opening a portal to the netherworld so she can retrieve her true body. With no more need of Yukina, she betrays and cuts ties with her. Kanami and her friends decide to go on a mission to retrieve Hiyori's sword while Souraku sides with the Sword Administration to stop Princess Tagitsu. Kanami's friends hold off the imperial guard and hostile aradama while Kanami and Yukari go to confront Princess Tagitsu. Meanwhile, Yukina is saved from a pack of aradama by Yomi. Kanami realizes Hiyori is still alive within Princess Tagitsu and manages to cut her, allowing Hiyori to escape. Kanami, Hiyori, and Yukari temporarily retreat and reunite with their friends.
23	"Moment's End"; Transliteration: "Setsuna no Hate" (Japanese: 刹那の果て)	June 15, 2018
Kanami, Hiyori, and the rest of the group take a brief rest before facing Princess Tagitsu, who they learn is attempting plunge Earth into the netherworld by opening a massive portal. Meanwhile, Maki and Suzuka find Yukina giving funeral rites to Yomi, who had died. They take Yukina away, leaving Yomi's body to be absorbed by a mass of noro. Kanami and her friends engage Princess Tagitsu, but she proves too powerful, leaving only Kanami and Hiyori as her opponents. With no other choice, both Kanami and Hiyori manage to stab Princess Tagitsu and prepare the ritual to banish her to the netherworld. Some time later, Ayumu awakens in the hospital and asks where Kanami is, wanting to apologize to her.
24	"The United Maidens"; Transliteration: "Musubi no Miko" (Japanese: 結びの巫女)	June 22, 2018
Kanami and Hiyori seal Princess Tagitsu in the netherworld along with themselves, closing the portal and saving the world. Two months later, life has gone back to normal, with the Sword Administration taking steps to prepare for Princess Tagitsu's eventual return. Kanami and Hiyori are officially declared missing, though their friends are certain they will return. In the netherworld, Kanami and Hiyori meet the spirits of the teenage versions of Kagari and Minato, who were left behind when the real Kagari and Minato unsuccessfully tried to seal Princess Tagitsu. After having a brief reunion, Kagari and Minato show Kanami and Hiyori a path to return to the real world, since their bodies are still intact. After returning, Kanami and Hiyori face off against each other again in the final match of the school tournament.

== Mini Toji ==
No.	Title	Original release date
0	"Katana Maidens Quickening Arc 205-Second Introduction Special!"; Transliteration: "Kana bi bi-en no "toji miko taidō hen" 205 byō de shōkai tokuban!" (Japanese: 可奈美・美炎の「とじみこ 胎動編」205秒で紹介特番！)	January 5, 2019
1	"Special Training"; Transliteration: "Tokkun" (Japanese: とっくん)	January 12, 2019
2	"Present"; Transliteration: "Purezento" (Japanese: ぷれぜんと)	January 19, 2019
3	"Evening Cherry Blossoms"; Transliteration: "Yo zakura" (Japanese: よざくら)	January 26, 2019
4	"Getting Along"; Transliteration: "Nakayoshi" (Japanese: なかよし)	February 2, 2019
5	"Big Sister"; Transliteration: "Onē-san" (Japanese: おねえさん)	February 9, 2019
6	"Omusubi"; Transliteration: "Omusubi" (Japanese: おむすび)	February 16, 2019
7	"Horizon Alliance"; Transliteration: "Horaizo n dō mei" (Japanese: ほらいぞんどうめい)	February 23, 2019
8	"Sulking"; Transliteration: "Yasagure" (Japanese: やさぐれ)	March 2, 2019
9	"Festival"; Transliteration: "Omatsuri" (Japanese: おまつり)	March 9, 2019
10	"Fireworks"; Transliteration: "Hanabi" (Japanese: はなび)	March 16, 2019

== Home release ==
=== Japanese ===
In Japan, Media Factory released the series in 6 volumes from April 25, 2018, to September 26, 2018.

Media Factory (Japan, Region 2 / A)
Volume	Episodes	Release date	Ref.
1	1–4	April 25, 2018	
2	5–8	May 25, 2018	
3	9–12	June 27, 2018	
4	13–16	July 25, 2018	
5	17–20	August 24, 2018	
6	21–24	September 26, 2018	

=== English ===
Funimation (Region A, B)
Volume	Episodes	Release date	Ref.
1	1–12	March 26, 2019	
2	13–24	May 21, 2019	
