= Bonobono =

Manga series by Mikio Igarashi

- Cover of manga volume 29

ぼのぼの
- Manga
- Written by: Mikio Igarashi
- Published by: Takeshobo
- Magazine: Manga Club (1986–2020); Manga Life (1986–2022); Manga Life Original (2022–present)
- Original run: March 1986 – present
- Volumes: 50
- Manga

Bono-chan
- Written by: Mikio Igarashi
- Published by: Takeshobo
- Magazine: Manga Life
- Original run: April 2016 – April 2020
- Volumes: 8
- Anime film
- Directed by: Mikio Igarashi
- Produced by: Atsushi Tashiro
- Written by: Mikio Igarashi
- Music by: Gontiti
- Studio: Group TAC
- Released: November 13, 1993
- Runtime: 103 minutes
- Anime television series
- Directed by: Hitoshi Nanba
- Produced by: Keisuke Iwata; Katsutoshi Kanesaka
- Written by: Tetsuo Yasumi
- Music by: Kazunori Miyake
- Studio: Group TAC
- Original network: TXN (TV Tokyo)
- Original run: April 20, 1995 – March 28, 1996
- Episodes: 48
- Video game

Bonogurashi
- Developer: Amuse, Bandai Visual
- Publisher: Amuse, Bandai Visual
- Genre: Simulation
- Platform: 3DO
- Released: April 21, 1995
- Video game

Bonogurashi: Kore de Kanpeki Disu
- Developer: Amuse
- Publisher: Amuse
- Genre: Adventure
- Platform: Sony PlayStation
- Released: June 7, 1996
- Anime film

Bonobono: Kumomo no Ki no Koto
- Directed by: Kōki Kumagai
- Produced by: Akihiro Itō
- Written by: Mikio Igarashi; Kōki Kumagai
- Music by: Gontiti
- Studio: Amuse Pictures
- Released: August 10, 2002
- Runtime: 61 minutes
- Anime television series
- Directed by: Hidenori Yamaguchi
- Produced by: Daisuke Hara; Yasunari Maeda; Yōko Matsushita
- Written by: Mitsutaka Hirota
- Music by: Takatsugu Wakabayashi
- Studio: Eiken
- Original network: Fuji TV
- Original run: April 2, 2016 – present
- Episodes: 537

Bonobono (ぼのぼの) is a Japanese yonkoma manga series written and illustrated by Mikio Igarashi. From March 1986 to March 1987, the series ran in the Takeshobo manga magazine Tensai Club before the magazine was replaced with Manga Club, where it had been serialized from April 1987 to April 2020. It had also been serialized in Manga Life from April 1986 to July 2022. In July 2022, the series moved to Manga Life Original after Manga Life folded. It has been adapted into an anime television series, as well as two anime films and two video games.

While the series is considered a yonkoma manga, most of the "stories" use eight panels. The series follows the main character, a young sea otter after whom the manga is titled, and his daily adventures with his friends from the nearby forest. Bonobono combines gag comic and philosophical questions, bringing up comparisons to other manga such as Azumanga Daioh, and to films such as Forrest Gump.

In 1988, Bonobono won the Kodansha Manga Award in the General category. An anime film was released in theaters on November 13, 1993, and an anime television series was broadcast on TV Tokyo from April 20, 1995, through March 28, 1996. One day after the TV series began, a simulation game was released on the 3DO system. The following June, an adventure game was released on the PlayStation. Several ehon—or "picture books"—have been released since the manga series was first introduced over 30 years ago.

== Characters ==
- Bonobono (ぼのぼの): A mellow sea otter that lives with his father by the ocean near the forest. His mother died in childbirth. He is a bit naïve in the ways of the world, and is curious in general. Never seen without a shellfish in his hand, in case he gets hungry.
- Shimarisu-kun/Chipmunk (シマリスくん): A young chipmunk who is friends with Bonobono. He has a habit of asking if people are going to bully him (いじめる? Ijimeru?) and is regularly tormented by Araiguma and his older sister Shō. However, he does bring some of it on himself; depending on the day, he can unintentionally or even intentionally say things to rile them up. Like Bonobono, he always carries something with him, in his case a walnut.
- Araiguma-kun/Raccoon (アライグマくん): A young raccoon who is friends with Bonobono. He has a very short fuse and often plays the tsukkomi for his other two friends. He likes to bully Shimarisu, and often gets into trouble with his father.
- Sunadori Neko-san/Fishing Cat (スナドリネコさん): An animal who is not native to the Forest, but is the currently named strongest animal there after defeating Higuma no Taishō. Bonobono and friends often ask him questions about certain subjects. In general, he's often portrayed as one of the more sensible residents of the Forest.
- Bonobono's Father (ぼのぼののおとうさん): The father of Bonobono. He is a somewhat bumbling man who tries to bond with his son in silly ways. He speaks with pauses in between phrases. Likes to go on long journeys. His wife died in childbirth.
- Araiguma-kun's Father (アライグマくんのおとうさん): The father of Araiguma-kun. A very ornery animal, he gets set off at the slightest annoyance or indiscretion. Takes out his anger constantly on Araiguma-kun.
- Kuzuri-kun/Wolverine (クズリくん): A young wolverine that walks on all fours. He has a bad habit of pooping all over the forest.
- Kuzuri-kun's Father (クズリくんのおとうさん): The father of Kuzuri-kun. The closest thing the Forest has to a medicine man, Kuzuri-kun's Father has plenty of plants and herbs in his home that are relevant to the topic at hand. Resourceful, but somewhat eccentric. He is very proud of his son.
- Fenegi-kun/Fennec Kitsune/Fenny (フェネギくん): A young fennec fox who is friends with Bonobono and company. Self conscious.
- Shō Nee-chan (しょうねえちゃん): One of Shimarisu-kun's elder sisters. She loves to pick on him and always wins their fights, but has a soft spot for him underneath her bullying nature.
- Dai Nee-chan (だいねえちゃん): One of Shimarisu-kun's elder sisters. Acts very proper and elegant, but often embellishes information she gets. She desires for Shimarisu-kun to become independent.
- Anaguma/Badger (アナグマくん): A stoic young badger whose acquaintances are Bonobono and friends. No one can tell what is on his mind, since he does not emote.
- Higuma no Taishō/Boss Bear (ヒグマの大将): The former strongest of the Forest before being defeated by Sunadori Neko. While he is benevolent and wishes to protect the Forest, he does not wish for Sunadori Neko to be there since he is an outsider. Lives away from his wife and child. Immense in size.
- Shimacchau Ojisan/The Putaway Man (しまっちゃうおじさん): A tall serval-like animal that seems to exist only in Bonobono's imagination as a bogeyman. If Bonobono does something wrong, Shimacchau Ojisan will hypothetically come and lock him away in a cave.

== Books ==
In addition to the original tankōbon releases, the first twenty tankōbon volumes have been rereleased in bunkoban format as 15 volumes. Several stand-alone picture books have been released as well.

For the first film, an ekonte—or storyboard—volume and a set of four film comics have been released.

=== Manga ===
==== Tankōbon ====
Takeshobo released all the volumes of manga listed below.

- Volume 1, ISBN 4-88475-317-8, March 1987
- Volume 2, ISBN 4-88475-318-6, December 1987
- Volume 3, ISBN 4-88475-319-4, September 1988
- Volume 4, ISBN 4-88475-320-8, August 1989
- Volume 5, ISBN 4-88475-468-9, September 1990
- Volume 6, ISBN 4-88475-516-2, June 1991
- Volume 7, ISBN 4-88475-555-3, November 1991
- Volume 8, ISBN 4-88475-645-2, May 1993
- Volume 9, ISBN 4-88475-670-3, October 1993
- Volume 10, ISBN 4-88475-761-0, November 1994
- Volume 11, ISBN 4-88475-827-7, August 1995
- Volume 12, ISBN 4-8124-5001-2, January 1996
- Volume 13, ISBN 4-8124-5085-3, September 1996
- Volume 14, ISBN 4-8124-5123-X, March 1997
- Volume 15, ISBN 4-8124-5166-3, December 1997
- Volume 16, ISBN 4-8124-5230-9, September 1998
- Volume 17, ISBN 4-8124-5250-3, August 1999
- Volume 18, ISBN 4-8124-5330-5, December 1999
- Volume 19, ISBN 4-8124-5415-8, August 2000
- Volume 20, ISBN 4-8124-5465-4, January 2001
- Volume 21, ISBN 4-8124-5666-5, May 2002
- Volume 22, ISBN 4-8124-5777-7, February 2003
- Volume 23, ISBN 4-8124-5838-2, July 2003
- Volume 24, ISBN 4-8124-5904-4, January 2004
- Volume 25, ISBN 4-8124-6009-3, July 2005
- Volume 26, ISBN 4-8124-6095-6, January 2005
- Volume 27, ISBN 4-8124-6273-8, October 2005
- Volume 28, ISBN 4-8124-6483-8, July 2006
- Volume 29, ISBN 978-4-8124-6574-5, April 2007
- Volume 30, ISBN 978-4-8124-6800-5, March 2008
- Volume 31, ISBN 978-4-8124-7130-2, July 2009
- Volume 32, ISBN 978-4-8124-7146-3, August 2009
- Volume 33, ISBN 978-4-8124-7214-9, December 2009
- Volume 34, ISBN 978-4-8124-7436-5, August 2010
- Volume 35, ISBN 978-4-8124-7631-4, July 2011
- Volume 36, ISBN 978-4-8124-7781-6, May 2012
- Volume 37, ISBN 978-4-8124-8362-6, July 2013
- Volume 38, ISBN 978-4-8124-8517-0, February 2014
- Volume 39, ISBN 978-4-8124-8732-7, July 2014
- Volume 40, ISBN 978-4-8019-5292-8, June 2015
- Volume 41, ISBN 978-4-8019-5482-3, March 2016
- Volume 42, ISBN 978-4-8019-5790-9, March 2017
- Volume 43, ISBN 978-4-8019-621-56. March 2018
- Volume 44, ISBN 978-4-8019-655-60. March 2019
- Volume 45, ISBN 978-4-8019-690-18. March 2020
- Volume 46, ISBN 978-4-8019-724-45. March 2021
- Volume 47, ISBN 978-4-8019-758-28. March 2022
- Volume 48, ISBN 978-4-8019-809-83. July 2023
- Volume 49, ISBN 978-4-8019-841-58. September 2024
- Volume 50, ISBN 978-4-8019-901-04. July 2026

==== Bunkoban ====
Takeshobo released all the volumes of manga listed below.

- Volume 1, ISBN 4-8124-0938-1, July 2002
- Volume 2, ISBN 4-8124-0939-X, July 2002
- Volume 3, ISBN 4-8124-0940-3, July 2002
- Volume 4, ISBN 4-8124-0941-1, July 2002
- Volume 5, ISBN 4-8124-0942-X, July 2002
- Volume 6, ISBN 4-8124-1053-3, January 2003
- Volume 7, ISBN 4-8124-1054-1, January 2003
- Volume 8, ISBN 4-8124-1055-X, January 2003
- Volume 9, ISBN 4-8124-1056-8, January 2003
- Volume 10, ISBN 4-8124-1057-6, January 2003
- Volume 11, ISBN 4-8019-0172-7, January 2015
- Volume 12, ISBN 4-8019-0238-3, March 2015
- Volume 13, ISBN 4-8019-0306-1, May 2015
- Volume 14, ISBN 4-8019-0390-8, July 2015
- Volume 15, ISBN 4-8019-0666-4, March 2016

==== Film comics ====
These books contain scenes from the first Bonobono film laid out in comic book format. All were released by Takeshobo.

- Volume 1, ISBN 4-88475-683-5, December 1993
- Volume 2, ISBN 4-88475-684-3, December 1993
- Volume 3, ISBN 4-88475-685-1, January 1994
- Volume 4, ISBN 4-88475-686-X, January 1994

=== Storyboards ===
This book contains the storyboards for the first Bonobono film.

- Bonobono no Ekonteshū (ぼのぼの絵コンテ集), ISBN 4-88475-254-6, November 1993, Takeshobo

=== Picture books ===
Various Bonobono picture books have been released, including the following. Titles are listed chronologically.

- Kawaisō no Koto (かわいそうのこと), ISBN 4-88475-027-6, December 1987, Takeshobo
- Shimarisu-kun Daikatsuyaku!! Gō (シマリスくん大活躍!!号), ISBN 4-88475-027-6, December 1987, Takeshobo
- Ōkii no Koto Chiisai no Koto (大きいのこと 小さいのこと), ISBN 4-88475-033-0, June 1988, Takeshobo
- Megane Yamane-kun no Koto (メガネヤマネくんのこと), ISBN 4-88475-041-1, May 1989, Takeshobo
- Kurisumasu no Koto (クリスマスのこと), ISBN 4-8124-0421-5, November 1998, Takeshobo
- Minna Omoide na no Darō: Bonobono no Kagashū (みんな思い出なのだろう―ぼのぼの詩画集), ISBN 4-88475-253-8, November 1993, Takeshobo
- Bonobono (ぼのぼの), ISBN 4-88475-255-4, December 1993, Takeshobo
- Tsuwaio no Koto (ツワイオのこと), ISBN 4-8124-2761-4, July 2006, Takeshobo

== Anime ==
=== 1993 film ===
The first theatrical release, titled Bonobono, opened in theaters on 1993-11-13. The film has since been broadcast on domestic television in Japan, including on broadcast satellite channels such as NHK BS-2. The film has been released on VHS and DVD in Japan, including in a "no cut" edition.

==== Staff ====
- Director: Mikio Igarashi
- Screenplay: Mikio Igarashi
- Animation directors: Yūji Mutō, Tameo Kohanawa
- Producer: Atsushi Tashiro
- Planning: Ippei Takahashi, Masayuki Miyashita, Shin Unosawa, Atsushi Tashiro, Naomasa Tsuruta
- Art director: Atsushi Ioki
- Music: Gontiti
- Distribution: Gaga Communications
- Theme song: Hatsukoi
  - Lyrics: Kanata Asamizu
  - Composition, Vocals: Yoshiyuki Ohsawa

==== Cast ====
- Bonobono: Toshiko Fujita
- Shimarisu-kun: Sumie Baba
- Araiguma-kun: Yūsaku Yara
- Araiguma-kun's father: Chikao Ōtsuka
- Kuzuri-kun's father: Kazuo Kumakura
- Kuzuri-kun: Sakiko Uran
- Higuma-san: Yūko Sasaki
- Kohiguma-kun: Mayumi Kumagai
- Bonobono's father: Mikio Igarashi
- Shō Nee-chan: Mayumi Tanaka
- Dai Nee-chan: Manami Sasaki
- Higuma no Taishō: Tesshō Genda
- Sunadorineko-san: Hōchū Ōtsuka
- Shimarisu-kun's father: Kazuyuki Sekiguchi
- Shimarisu-kun's mother: Yukiko Shibata
- Fennec Kitsune-kun: Kanako Tanaka
- Fennec Kitsune-kun's father: Takahiro Fujita

=== 1995 TV series ===
The Bonobono anime television series ran from April 20, 1995, through March 28, 1996, as part of the "Anime Can" (アニメ缶, Anime Kan) series on Tuesday evenings from 7:00 pm to 7:30 pm on TV Tokyo. Each episode was 15 minutes long, and was paired with an episode of Bit the Cupid to fill out the 30-minute timeslot. The series has been rebroadcast on several different channels and networks, including Animax and the on-demand internet streaming service GyaO.

The entire TV series was released as two DVD box sets on April 20, 2007.

==== Staff ====
- Planning: Takashi Sakurai, Atsushi Tashiro
- Director: Hitoshi Nanba
- Series Director: Tetsuo Yasumi
- Character Design: Yūka Hotani
- Chief Animation Director: Yūka Hotani
- Writers: Tetsuo Yasumi, Yasuhiro Komatsuzaki, Satoru Nishizono, Shōji Yonemura, Kazuhiko Gōdo, Chinatsu Hōjō
- Episode Directors: Kiyotaka Ōhata, Takashi Ikebata, Shinichi Watanabe, Takashi Yamazaki, Daiji Suzuki, Kiyoshi Fukumoto, Kiyoko Sayama, Tetsuya Watanabe, Takashi Asami, Kazunari Kume, others
- Music: Kazunori Miyake
- Audio Director: Susumu Aketagawa
- Music Producer: Sumio Matsuzaki
- Art Director: Kō Watanabe
- Editor: Masashi Furukawa
- Director of Photography: Mitsunobu Yoshida
- Producers: Keisuke Iwata (TV Tokyo), Masatoshi Kanesaka
- Animation Producer: Kenjirō Kawato
- Animation Production: Group Tac
- Production: TV Tokyo, Amuse, Inc.

==== Theme songs ====
Chikamichi Shitai (近道したい)
Lyrics, Vocals: Kyōko Suga
Composition, Arrangement: Etsuko Yamakawa
Ending theme for episodes 1–23 and 48
Love, Two Love
Lyrics, Composition, Vocals: Kyōko Suga
Arrangement: Ryō Yonemitsu
Ending theme for episodes 24–47

==== Cast ====
- Bonobono: Kumiko Watanabe
- Shimarisu-kun: Konami Yoshida
- Araiguma-kun: Keiji Fujiwara
- Sunadorineko-san: Jūrōta Kosugi
- Araiguma-kun's father: Hideyuki Umezu
- Araiguma-kun's mother: Keiko Han
- Bonobono's father: Takashi Nagasako
- Dai Nee-chan: Miki Narahashi
- Shō Nee-chan: Mayumi Tanaka
- Shimarisu-kun's father: Chafurin
- Shimarisu-kun's mother: Konami Yoshida
- Kuzuri-kun: Sakiko Uran
- Tamago no Kimi-kun: Sakiko Uran
- Kuzuri-kun's father: Sakiko Uran
- Fennec Kitsune-kun: Michiyo Yanagisawa
- Fennec Kitsune-kun's father: Keaton Yamada
- Bōzu-kun: Midori Nakazawa
- Beaver-san: Masahiro Anzai
- Bōzu-kun's mother: Rin Mizuhara
- Kohiguma-kun: Aya Ishizu
- Kokujira-kun: Aya Ishizu
- Higuma no Taishō: Kiyoyuki Yanada
- Higuma-san: Junko Hagimori
- Hae: Kōji Tobe
- Shimatchū Oji-san, others: Nobuo Tobita
- Yama-Ō, others: Yūji Ueda
- Ki no Obake: Chie Satō
- Min Min: Akiko Yajima
- Nan Nan: Kōji Yusa
- Ōsanshōuo-san: Toshiya Ueda
- Kaeru-kun: Toshiya Ueda
- Kokujira-kun's mother: Mari Mashiba
- Nagareboshi-kun: Hiromi Ishikawa
- Rabi Nii-chan: Nobuyuki Hiyama
- Chirabi-chan: Kae Araki
- Chibisuke to Okera-kun: Fujiko Takimoto
- Kashira to Gonzo: Kōji Ishii

=== TV specials ===
Following the anime television series, nine specials were aired on TV Tokyo. At the beginning of each special, the next special was also introduced and showed some animation from it. The specials used a lot of animation from the series, and while the content fit the season in which the special was broadcast, the music, scripts, and jokes were changed for each of the specials. The voice actors from the TV series were used for the specials.

- Oshōgatsu Da yo: Bonobono no World (January 2, 1997)
- Kodomo no Hi Da yo: Bonobono no World (May 5, 1997)
- Natsu Yasumi Da yo: Bonobono no World (July 21, 1997)
- Taiiku no Hi Da yo: Bonobono no World! (October 10, 1997)
- Oshōgatsu Da yo: Bonobono no World! (January 1, 1998)
- Kodomo wa Kaze no Ko: Bonobono no World! (February 1, 1998)
- Kodomo no Hi Da yo: Bonobono no World (May 5, 1998)
- Shokuyoku no Aki Da yo: Bonobono no World! (September 23, 1998)
- Oyako Anime Gekijō Bonobono: Jōji Namahage (December 23, 1998)

=== 2002 film ===
Bonobono: Kumomo no Ki no Koto (ぼのぼの クモモの木のこと) was the second theatrical Bonobono movie, released by Amuse Pictures in theaters in Japan on August 10, 2002. It was done completely in 3D.

==== Staff ====
- Original Story: Mikio Igarashi
- Director: Kōki Kumagai
- Producer: Akihiro Itō
- Screenplay Supervisor: Mikio Igarashi
- Screenplay: Mikio Igarashi, Kōki Kumagai
- Planning: Kiyoshi Tsuji, Akihiro Itō
- Music: Gontiti
- Storyboards: Mikio Igarashi, Kōki Kumagai
- Executive Producers: Ippei Takahashi, Yasumasa Makimura

==== Cast ====
- Bonobono: Yūto Uemura
- Shimarisu-kun: Konami Yoshida
- Araiguma-kun: Kappei Yamaguchi
- Bobo-kun: Etsuko Kozakura
- Bobo-kun's father: Masashi Sugawara
- Bobo-kun's mother: Sumi Shimamoto
- Kuzuri-kun: Yōko Michihira
- Kuzuri-kun's father: Yūichi Nagashima
- Sunadorineko-san: Reo Morimoto
- Araiguma-kun's father: Danshi Tatekawa

=== 2016 TV series ===
A 2nd anime television adaptation started airing on April 2, 2016. Unlike the previous television series, the episode runtime has been cut from 15 minutes to 5 minutes per episode. A Planetarium special Bono Bono - Uchū kara Kita Tomodachi (Bono Bono - The Friend That Came From Space) was shown at the Gotanda Cultural Center from September 16 to October 9, 2017. Crunchyroll only simulcasted the first three seasons of the series and is no longer available. On December 21, 2019, the series had a crossover with Gachapin. The anime was on hiatus due to the COVID-19 pandemic from May to June 2020. It resumed on June 20, 2020. As of November 10, 2026, it has aired 537 episodes.

==== Staff ====
- Director: Hidenori Yamaguchi

==== Theme song ====
Bonobono Suru (bonobonoする)
Lyrics, Vocals: Monobright

==== Cast ====
- Bonobono: Fukuko Yukimiyama
- Shimarisu-kun: Aya Ogata
- Araiguma-kun: Shinpei Takano
- Sunadorineko-san: Yūki Kurofuji

== Games ==
Two games based on the Bonobono series have been released. The first was Bonogurashi (ぼのぐらし), a simulation game released on 1995-04-21 for the 3DO Interactive Multiplayer system by Amuse and Bandai Visual.

The second game was titled Bonogurashi: Kore de Kanpeki Disu (ぼのぐらし〜これで完璧でぃす〜), an adventure game released by Amuse for the PlayStation system on 1996-06-07.
