= Gontiti =

Japanese acoustic guitar duo

Gontiti ゴンチチ
- Origin: Osaka, Japan
- Years active: 1978–present
- Labels: Epic; Sony; Pony Canyon; FlyingDog
- Members: Gonzalez Mikami; Chichi Matsumura
- Website: gontiti.jp

Gontiti (ゴンチチ, Gon'chichi; sometimes rendered gontiti or GONTITI) is a Japanese acoustic guitar duo formed in 1978 by Masahiko "Gonzalez" Mikami (ゴンザレス三上, Gonzaresu Mikami; born 30 December 1953 in Osaka, Japan) and Masahide "Titi" Matsumura (チチ松村, Chichi Matsumura; born 6 September 1954, also in Osaka). Gontiti's music incorporates a number of styles, including bossa nova, flamenco, and classical music.

== Recordings ==
As of 2007 Gontiti have recorded more than thirty original albums and compilations. Most of their recordings have been for Epic/Sony Records. The duo have also provided music for a number of Japanese films, most notably the 2004 Hirokazu Kore-eda film Dare mo shiranai, released in English-speaking countries as Nobody Knows.

=== Discography ===
Album title (Album title in Japanese)	Year released	Label	Note
Another Mood (Another Mood)	1983	Casablanca	Debut album; Released as "Gonzalez Mikami & Titi Matsumura"
Wakiyaku de arutomo shirazuni (脇役であるとも知らずに)	1984	Epic/Sony Records	Second album
Physics (PHYSICS)	1985	Epic/Sony Records	Third album
Sunday Market (SUNDAY MARKET)	1986	Epic/Sony Records	Released in US from Portrait Records
JAPANESE IN WINTER (冬の日本人)	1986	Epic/Sony Records	
Legacy of Madam Q (マダムQの遺産)	1987	Epic/Sony Records	
Yellow Tornade	1988	Nektar	Compilation album from a label of West Germany
Twinkle Garden (Twinkle Garden)	1988	Epic/Sony Records	Mini album in 3-inch CD
In the Garden (In the Garden)	1988	Epic/Sony Records	
Spirit of Gontiti (Spirit of Gontiti)	1989	Epic/Sony Records	Best of album released with its counterpart Body of Gontiti
Body of Gontiti (Body of Gontiti)	1989	Epic/Sony Records	Best of album released with its counterpart Spirit of Gontiti
Devonian Boys (Devonian Boys)	1990	Epic/Sony Records	
Another Mood + Wakiyaku de arutomo shirazuni (Another Mood + 脇役であるとも知らずに)	1990	Epic/Sony Records	Re-release of first & second album
Fingering Christmas (Fingering Christmas)	1990	Epic/Sony Records	
KIT (KIT)	1991	Epic/Sony Records	
Munou no hito (無能の人)	1991	Epic/Sony Records	Soundtrack album of a Naoto Takenaka film
Gravity Loves Time (Gravity Loves Times)	1992	Epic/Sony Records	
Never on Sundays: Original Soundtrack (「日曜はダメよ」オリジナル・サウンドトラック)	1993	Epic/Sony Records	Soundtrack album of a television drama series
Bonobono: Original Soundtrack (ぼのぼの Original soundtrack)	1993	Epic/Sony Records	Soundtrack album of an animated film Bonobono
VACANCES (VACANCES)	1994	Epic/Sony Records	Best of album
Black Ant's Life (Black Ant's Life)	1995	Epic/Sony Records	
LIVE (LIVE)	1996	Epic/Sony Records	First live album
TELEVISION SOUND TRACK: SONGS OF RHEIN (NHK「世界悠々父なる大河、ライン」オリジナル・サウンドトラック)	1997	Epic/Sony Records	Maxi single from soundtrack of a television program
EASY BUSY (EASY BUSY)	1997	Epic/Sony Records	Teresa Bright is a guest vocalist
DUO (DUO)	1997	Epic/Sony Records	First album made by only two guitars of Gontiti
Strings with Gontiti (Strings with Gontiti)	1998	Epic/Sony Records	
Red Box (Red Box)	1999	Epic/Sony Records	
Best of Gontiti Works (Best of Gontiti Works)	2000	Epic/Sony Records	Best of album
GUITARS (GUITARS)	2001	Pony Canyon	Second album made by only two guitars of Gontiti; SACD hybrid disc released in 2005
Nangoku-ongaku: Resort Music Series (南国音楽 Resort Music Series)	2001	Epic Records Japan	Best of album; SACD disc
made in Ukulele (made in Ukulele)	2002	Pony Canyon	Includes soundtrack of an animated film Bonobono: Kumomo no Ki no Koto; SACD hybrid disc released in 2005
gontiti best (gontiti best)	2002	Epic Records Japan	Best of album
Yokohama Kaidashi Kikou: Best Soundtracks (ヨコハマ買い出し紀行 ベスト・サウンドトラックス)	2002	Sony Music Entertainment Japan	Best of soundtrack album of a radio drama and an original video animation Yokohama Kaidashi Kikou
A Magic Wand of "Standards" (A Magic Wand of "Standards")	2002	Pony Canyon	SACD hybrid disc released in 2005
GONTITI RECOMMENDS GONTITI (GONTITI RECOMMENDS GONTITI)	2003	Epic Records Japan	Best of album; Double album
gontiti 25th Anniversary CD (gontiti 25th Anniversary CD)	2003	Pony Canyon	Best of album by re-recording; SACD hybrid disc released in 2005
Nobody Knows: Original Soundtrack (映画「誰も知らない」 サウンドトラック)	2004	Pony Canyon	Maxi single from soundtrack of a Hirokazu Kore-eda film Nobody Knows
XO (XO)	2004	Pony Canyon	SACD hybrid disc released in 2005
Otona no natsu-yasumi: Original Soundtrack (おとなの夏休み オリジナル・サウンドトラック)	2005	Pony Canyon	Soundtrack album of a television drama series
Garyū hitosuji (我流一筋)	2006	Pony Canyon	
Gontiti Super Best 2001-2006 (Gontiti スーパーベスト 2001-2006)	2007	Pony Canyon	Best of album
ONLINE LIMITED 1 (ONLINE LIMITED 1)	2007	In The Garden Records	Released only in online music store
Still Walking: Original Soundtrack (映画「歩いても歩いても」サウンドトラック)	2008	In The Garden Records	Soundtrack album of a Hirokazu Kore-eda film Still Walking
VSOD -very special ordinary days- (VSOD -very special ordinary days-)	2008	Epic Records Japan	
LIVE At Shirakawa Hall '09 (Online Limited 2) (LIVE At Shirakawa Hall '09 (Online Limited 2))	2009	In The Garden Records	Live album; Released only in online music store
MERRY CHRISTMAS with GONTITI -BEST SELECTION OF CHRISTMAS SONGS- (MERRY CHRISTMAS with GONTITI -BEST SELECTION OF CHRISTMAS SONGS-)	2010	Epic Records Japan	
humble music (humble music)	2011	Epic Records Japan	Third album made by only two guitars of Gontiti
Going My Home: Original Soundtrack (ドラマ「ゴーイング マイ ホーム」サウンドトラック)	2012	In The Garden Records	Soundtrack album of a Hirokazu Kore-eda television drama series; Released only in online music store
Ore wa mada honki dashitenaidake: Original Soundtrack (映画「俺はまだ本気出してないだけ」本気音楽集)	2013	Epic Records Japan	Soundtrack album of a Yūichi Fukuda film based on a manga I'll Give It My All... Tomorrow
"Amanchu!" Original Soundtrack (TVアニメ「あまんちゅ!」オリジナルサウンドトラック)	2016	FlyingDog	Soundtrack album of the animated adaptation of Kozue Amano's manga Amanchu!
"Amanchu! ~Advance~" Original Soundtrack (TVアニメーション「あまんちゅ! ~あどばんす~」オリジナルサウンドトラック )	2018	FlyingDog	Soundtrack album of the second season of Amanchu!
we are here -After 40 years, we are here-	2018	Pony Canyon	Original album celebrating 40 years as a music duo
