= Yuuna and the Haunted Hot Springs =

Japanese manga and anime series

- First tankōbon volume cover, featuring Yuuna Yunohana

ゆらぎ荘の幽奈さん (Yuragi-sō no Yūna-san)
- Genre: Comedy; Harem; Supernatural
- Manga
- Written by: Tadahiro Miura
- Published by: Shueisha
- English publisher: NA: Seven Seas Entertainment
- Imprint: Jump Comics
- Magazine: Weekly Shōnen Jump
- Original run: February 8, 2016 – June 8, 2020
- Volumes: 24
- Original video animation
- Directed by: Tsuyoshi Nagasawa
- Produced by: Nobuhiro Nakyama; Takamitsu Sueyoshi; Mamoru Minagawa (#1); Tomoyuki Oowada (#1–3); Takumi Kusakabe (#2–3); Takatoshi Chino (#4)
- Written by: Hideaki Koyasu
- Music by: Tomoki Kikuya
- Studio: Xebec (#1–3); Signal.MD (#4)
- Released: July 4, 2018 – December 4, 2020
- Episodes: 4
- Anime television series
- Directed by: Tsuyoshi Nagasawa
- Produced by: Nobuhiro Nakayama; Takamitsu Sueyoshi; Tomoyuki Oowada; Takumi Kusakabe
- Written by: Hideaki Koyasu
- Music by: Tomoki Kikuya
- Studio: Xebec
- Licensed by: BI: MVM Entertainment; NA: Aniplex of America
- Original network: Tokyo MX, GYT, GTV, BS11, KBS, Sun TV, GBS, MTV, AT-X
- Original run: July 14, 2018 – September 29, 2018
- Episodes: 12
- icon

Yuuna and the Haunted Hot Springs (Japanese: ゆらぎ荘の幽奈さん, Hepburn: Yuragi-sō no Yūna-san) is a Japanese manga series written and illustrated by Tadahiro Miura. The manga was serialized in Shueisha's Weekly Shōnen Jump magazine from February 2016 to June 2020, and collected into twenty-four tankōbon volumes.

In North America, Seven Seas Entertainment published the series in English under its Ghost Ship imprint from 2018 to 2023. An anime television series adaptation produced by Xebec aired from July to September 2018.

== Plot ==
The series follows the life of the luckless and homeless high school student Kogarashi Fuyuzora. In his search for a home, he is introduced to the Yuragi Inn, a cheap boarding house and former hot springs inn. The reason the rent is so cheap is because it is haunted by the beautiful ghost spirit Yuuna whose corpse was discovered at the inn. Kogarashi then helps Yuuna with her unfinished business, all while discovering the supernatural secrets of the rest of the female tenants.

== Characters ==
Kogarashi Fuyuzora (冬空 コガラシ, Fuyuzora Kogarashi)
Voiced by: Yūki Ono
A powerful psychic who can vanquish his foes easily. Prior to the start of the story, he was homeless before coming to the Yuragi Inn. As a child, he often lived in orphanages. Much to his chagrin, his body was susceptible to being easily possessed by spirits, causing misfortune in his childhood. However, he was able to become physically and spiritually stronger after training under Ōga Makyōin (魔境院逢牙, Makyōin Ōga), a descendant of the Yatahagane (八咫鋼, Yatahagane) family. He is the only known living person that can use the abilities of the Yatahagane, but also inheriting the weaknesses of the Yatahagane. Kogarashi is extremely popular with the females around him with almost all of the female characters being love interests of his.
Yuuna Yunohana (湯ノ花 幽奈, Yunohana Yūna)
Voiced by: Miyuri Shimabukuro
She is a ghost who is bound to the Yuragi Inn. She has no recollection of her life when she was alive and asks for Kogarashi's assistance in helping her discover who she was, developing an attachment to him in the process. In the manga however, she was revealed to be a clone made from Mahoro Tenko and a legendary monster Garandō. She is the legendary Genryūsai Tenko, a powerful warrior known for psychic prowess. She later uses her skills after she unlocks her memories, but retained her Yūna identity, and her bound ghost status was weakened enough to roam at the inn by night. At the end of the series she stays bound to the world of the living despite clearing her regrets due to wanting to stay with Kogarashi whom she marries soon after.
Sagiri Ameno (雨野 狭霧, Ameno Sagiri)
Voiced by: Rie Takahashi
A ninja from a clan of demon-slaying ninjas. She is dedicated to her duty as a ninja, spending time going on missions to destroy harmful supernatural creatures. Although she too has developed feelings towards Kogarashi, she chooses to bottle them up for her own pride and her intent on not getting in the way of the other girls who love Kogarashi. After she unlocked her ultimate spiritual armor, she confessed her love.
Hibari Ameno (雨野 雲雀, Ameno Hibari)
Voiced by: Honoka Inoue
The cousin of Sagiri who is also a ninja. She considers herself as a rival to Sagiri and wants to surpass her one day. She met Kogarashi and forced him to pretend to be her boyfriend to unnerve Sagiri. Eventually, she moves into the Yuragi Inn after being infatuated with Kogarashi's heroism as well as assisting Sagiri in her missions. In later chapters she eventually confessed and was rejected by Kogarashi (similar to Karura Hiogi), however that event only made her feelings stronger, making her bolder in her further pursuit of him. She also unlocked her ultimate ability, but Kogarashi still does not reciprocate her feelings in the slightest and continues to reject her.
Urara Kawashima (浦方 うらら, Kawashima Urara)
Sagiri and Hibari's friend and fellow Ninja. She uses her communication via telepathy and her paper shikigami.
Yaya Fushiguro (伏黒 夜々, Fushiguro Yaya)
Voiced by: Yui Ogura
A timid girl who acts as a vessel for a cat god. She exhibits catlike behavior as well as having cat ears and a tail when she is possessed by it. Through their bond, she is able to call on its power whenever it is needed, and she can also warp in more cat gods through her body, but at the cost of her cat abilities temporarily.
Chitose Nakai (仲居 ちとせ, Nakai Chitose)
Voiced by: Sayaka Harada
A zashiki-warashi who is the caretaker of the Yuragi Inn. She has the power to manipulate the fortune of others, but she rarely uses it because of its potential consequences. She also enters middle school thanks to Tsutomu, her childhood friend turned principal. She hides the fact that she enters school, until her cover was blown.
Nonko Arahabaki (荒覇吐 呑子, Arahabaki Nonko)
Voiced by: Ai Kakuma
An oni who works as a manga author. She loves to drink alcohol, and as she becomes more intoxicated, her power as an oni grows, but not always needed to drink it, her clan absorb the alcohol. She is formerly a member of the Yoinozaka (宵ノ坂, Yoinozaka) family, one of the three great families in Japan, but left the clan and pursued her passions. She is quite energetic, but an airhead.
Chisaki Miyazaki (宮崎 千紗希, Miyazaki Chisaki)
Voiced by: Eri Suzuki
A girl who befriends Kogarashi after meeting him during the first day of high school. She is also a popular girl at school, known for her beauty. She later develops feelings for Kogarashi when he shows to be a dependable person. She also befriends Yuuna, but is initially unable to see her due to a lack of supernatural powers, thus relying on written forms of communication to talk to her. When Koyuzu possesses her, she develops her ghost vision, allowing her to see Yuuna.
Oboro Shintō (神刀 朧, Shintō Oboro)
Voiced by: Mikako Komatsu
Oboro moves into the Yuragi Inn after being impressed by Kogarashi's strong physical and spiritual prowess. Her initial motivation to moving in was to preserve her family's bloodline by attempting to seduce Kogarashi. As she continues on this plan and interacting with the fellow tenants though, she begins to display emotion and genuine romantic feelings towards him. Oboro also has a younger half-brother named Genshiro Ryuga (龍雅 玄士郎, Ryūga Genshirō) (Voiced by: Yoshimasa Hosoya), who is the head of the Ryuuga clan and the current Black Dragon God.
Karura Hiōgi (緋扇 かるら, Hiōgi Karura)
Voiced by: Sora Amamiya
A tengu whose family is affiliated with the Yoinozaka family. She fell in love with Kogarashi when he stopped a conflict between the Yoinozaka and the Tenko (天狐, Tenko) family. Ever since then, she dedicated her time to finding Kogarashi. After rediscovering him, she abducts him to try and force him to marry her through a ritual, which ends in failure. After being rejected by Kogarashi, she strives to make amends with him for what she had done. Hiōgi tries her best to capture Kogarashi's heart as her clairvoyance ability shows he still harbors feelings for her. Hiōgi also has a nue for best friend named Mikogami Matora (ミコガミマトラ, Matora Mikogami) (Voiced by: Natsumi Fujiwara), who is always looking to challenge the strongest people she meets in combat.
Koyuzu Shigaraki (信楽 こゆず, Shigaraki Koyuzu)
Voiced by: Anzu Haruno
A tanuki who had been secretly stalking Chisaki in order to create the perfect human disguise. After being discovered by Chisaki, Kogarashi, and Yuuna, she eventually starts living in the Yuragi Inn after living alone for some time. She can create leaf charms that can transform themselves or other objects into new forms, but terrible on human transformation herself, a fact that she cannot go live like other tanukis who lives in human world. She can also possess other people, especially Chisaki. She was mature enough to live on her own, according to her race's rules, as tanukis are mature at a year old, and she is ten years old.
Miria Katsuragi (葛城 ミリア, Katsuragi Miria)
Voiced by: Nanami Yamashita
A young kitsune who is another member of Tenko clan, but on the branch family. Like Koyuzu, she can create leaf charms that can transform themselves or other objects into new forms. Miria though can live in the human world as she has mastered human transformation. She initially ventured to the Yuragi Inn just to find out if the rumor of Genryūsai Tenko was there, and was surprised to find it in Yuuna. Miria ends up enjoying her time at the Inn and joins the other girls in their fun, while creating a friendly rivalry with Koyuzu.

== Media ==
=== Manga ===
Written and illustrated by Tadahiro Miura, Yuuna and the Haunted Hot Springs was serialized in Shueisha's shōnen manga magazine Weekly Shōnen Jump from February 8, 2016, to June 8, 2020; a special chapter was published in Jump Giga on July 27 of that same year. Shueisha has compiled its chapters into twenty-four individual tankōbon volumes, released from June 3, 2016, to December 4, 2020. In North America, the series has been licensed in English by Seven Seas Entertainment, who released the first volume under its Ghost Ship imprint from May 8, 2018, to June 6, 2023.

==== Volumes ====
No.	Original release date	Original ISBN	English release date	English ISBN
1	June 3, 2016	978-4-08-880715-7	May 8, 2018	978-1-947804-04-3
1. "Yuuna and the Haunted Hot Springs"; 2. "The Secrets of Yuragi-sou"; 3. "Yuuna's Ping Pong Showdown"; 4. "School Spirit"; 5. "Yuuna and the Stuffed Animal Army"; 6. "Yuuna and the Great Chase"; 7. "A Sweet Holiday with Yuuna"
2	August 4, 2016	978-4-08-880754-6	June 26, 2018	978-1-947804-10-4
8. "Sagiri, Yokai Hunter"; 9. "Yaya, Cautious Kitty"; 10. "Sizing Up Yuuna"; 11. "Crunch Time for Nonko"; 12. "Kogarashi Gets Soapy"; 13. "Yuuna and Koyuzu Get Spirited Away"; 14. "Quick-Changing Yuuna"; 15. "Sagiri Passes Inspection"; 16. "Oboro, Whatever It Takes"
3	October 4, 2016	978-4-08-880794-2	August 7, 2018	978-1-947804-14-2
17. "Chisaki and the Haunted Hot Springs"; 18. "Chisaki, Caught Between a Tanuki and a Hard Place"; 19. "Chitose's Secret Adventure"; 20. "Yuuna is Watching (From Above)"; 21. "Renge's Secret"; 22. "Oboro and the Haunted Hot Springs"; 23. "Overly Aggressive Sagiri"; 24. "Kogarashi and the Seaside Summer School"; 25. "Chisaki's Test of Courage"; Bonus Chapter. "Koyuzu Asks Too Much"
4	December 2, 2016	978-4-08-880825-3	November 27, 2018	978-1-947804-25-8
26. "Slow Dancing with Yuuna"; 27. "Sagiri and the Final Exams"; 28. "Yuuna Goes South"; 29. "Kogarashi and the Legend of the Tragic Lovers"; 30. "Yuuna Before the Haunted Hot Springs"; 31. "Koyuzu and the Miyazakis"; 32. "Sagiri and the Shinobi Village"; 33. "Kogarashi and the Shinobi Village"; 34. "Stop, Hibari!!"
5	April 4, 2017	978-4-08-881025-6	March 26, 2019	978-1-947804-29-6
35. "Yaya and the Cat Teaser"; 36. "Oboro Is Okay with Being Second Best"; 37. "Oboro Goes to School"; 38. "Hibari and the Haunted Hot Springs"; 39. "It's Always Halloween at Yuragi-sou"; 40. "Yuuna and the Rugged Rabbit"; 41. "Hibari's Shapely Strategy"; 42. "Yuuna and the School Festival"; 43. "Sagiri's School Festival Meltdown"
6	July 4, 2017	978-4-08-881075-1	July 2, 2019	978-1-947804-35-7
44. "Yuuna and the Little Mermaid"; 45. "Yuragi-sou and the Cabinet of Curiosities"; 46. "Yuuna and the New Dawn"; 47. "Chisaki and the Blanket of Snow"; 48. "Hibari's Distress"; 49. "Sagiri and the Girls' Secret"; 50. "Magical Girl Koyuzu"; 51. "Sagiri's Numerous Worries"; 52. "Yuuna and the School Uniform Date"
7	September 4, 2017	978-4-08-881201-4	November 26, 2019	978-1-947804-41-8
53. "When Yuuna Was Alive"; 54. "Chisaki's Seasonal Job"; 55. "A Very Yuragi-sou Christmas"; 56. "A New Year's Shrine Visit with Yuuna"; 57. "Kogarashi's Birthday"; 58. ""Karura" and "Matora""; 59. "Karura and the Secret Room"; 60. "Operation Rescue Kogarashi"; 61. "Yaya Calls for Backup"
8	November 2, 2017	978-4-08-881220-5	January 28, 2020	978-1-947804-46-3
62. "The Battle to Capture Matora"; 63. "Karura vs. Yuuna"; 64. "Just Who Are You, Yuuna?"; 65. "Oboro Goes a Courtin'"; 66. "Nonko and Her Editor"; 67. "Valentine Extravaganza ①"; 68. "Valentine Extravaganza ②"; 69. "Valentine Extravaganza ③"; 70. "Yuuna on Ice"
9	January 4, 2018	978-4-08-881316-5	May 5, 2020	978-1-947804-53-1
71. "Operation: Lovey-Dovey Part-Time Job"; 72. "Li'l Kogarashi"; 73. "White Day Fantasy"; 74. "Shion-san's All Out Debut"; 75. "Back to School"; 76. "Thrilling Full Body Measurements"; 77. "Casefile: Panties"; 78. "Welcome, Shion-chan!"; 79. "Strategy of the Cursed Game"
10	April 4, 2018	978-4-08-881354-7	August 18, 2020	978-1-947804-56-2
80. "Sagiri Goes Down Memory Lane"; 81. "Meow Meow Paradise"; 82. "Career Day"; 83. "Karura vs. Oboro, Round One, Fight!"; 84. "The Seven Wonders of Yukemuri High School: Report 1"; 85. "Chisaki's Nightmares"; 86. "Matora's Hard Battle"; 87. "Yuuna & the Yukemuri Hot Springs Music Festival ①"; 88. "Yuuna & the Yukemuri Hot Springs Music Festival ②"; Close-Up Extra: "Tossin' and Turnin' with Yuuna"
11	July 4, 2018	978-4-08-881398-1; 978-4-08-908311-6 (BD)	November 24, 2020	978-1-947804-59-3
89. "Yuuna & the Yukemuri Hot Springs Music Festival ③"; 90. "Hibari Hits the Books"; 91. "Shion & Chisaki's Big Day Out!!"; 92. "A Heart-Throbbing Sleepover"; 93. "Miria & The Haunted Hot Springs"; 94. "Sagiri's Mission"; 95. "Yumesaki-sensei's Attack Pose"; 96. "Oboro's Perplexion"; 97. "Oboro's Feelings"; Extra Edition
12	October 4, 2018	978-4-08-881590-9; 978-4-08-908312-3 (BD)	January 26, 2021	978-1-947804-61-6
98. "Don't Underestimate Kogarashi"; 99. "Cursed Kogarashi"; 100. "A Day in the Afterlife of Yuuna-san"; 101. "Stop! Don't Do it, Hibari-chan!"; 102. "Hibari-chan's True Feelings"; 103. "Hibari-chan's Determination!!"; 104. "Magical Girl Koyuzu-chan :re"; 105. "Chisaki-san's Rainy Days"; 106. "The Great Water War! ①"
13	December 4, 2018	978-4-08-881665-4; 978-4-08-908340-6 (BD)	March 30, 2021	978-1-64827-487-9
107. "The Great Water War! ②"; 108. "The Great Water War! ③"; 109. "Sagiri's Super Secret Mission"; 110. "The Itsy-Bitsy Kogarashi"; 111. "Yumesaki-sensei Goes Nuts?!"; 112. "Nakai-san's Secret"; 113. "Kisara-sama the Super Psychic?!"; 114. "Where'd Yuuna-san Go?!"; 115. "Karura-sama's Herculean Task"
14	February 4, 2019	978-4-08-881718-7	May 25, 2021	978-1-64827-488-6
116. "Island Survival with Chisaki-san"; 117. "Hibari's on a Diet"; 118. "Let's Go to the Ocean!"; 119. "Kogarashi & His Master"; 120. "Ouga-san's Regrets"; 121. "Nonko Goes All-Out"; 122. "Up Close with Sagiri & Hibari..."; 123. "Yuuna-san Closes in on the Tenko Clan"; 124. "Yuuna-san's Family"
15	April 4, 2019	978-4-08-881794-1	September 7, 2021	978-1-64827-489-3
125. "Tenko Genryusai is... Yuuna?"; 126. "The Mastermind Revealed?!"; 127. "Byakuei Throws Down!"; 128. "Byakuei and Yuuna"; 129. "Ouga's Wish"; 130. "Koyuzu vs. Miria"; 131. "Karura the Stalker"; 132. "I Can See You, Chisaki"; 133. "Sagiri Heads Home"; Extra Content: "Manna-san and the Haunted Hot Springs"
16	June 4, 2019	978-4-08-881864-1	December 7, 2021	978-1-64827-494-7
134. "Yoinozaka's Shakuhito"; 135. "The Truth Behind Sagiri-san's Engagement"; 136. "Sagiri-san Grows Wary"; 137. "How Sagiri-san Fights"; 138. "Clumsy Sagiri-san"; 139. "Around the World with Yumesaki-sensei"; 140. "Nagai-san's Heart-Throbbing Adventure from School"; 141. "So Close?! A Hot Spring Incident!"; 142. "Chisaki-san Wants to Close the Distance"; Extra Content: "Yuuna and the Others Join the Saotome Shimai!"
17	August 2, 2019	978-4-08-882019-4	January 4, 2022	978-1-64827-498-5
143. "Yukemuri High School Trip ①"; 144. "Yukemuri High School Trip ②"; 145. "Chisaki-san and a White T-shirt"; 146. "A Future with Chisaki-san"; 147. "These Ten Years with Chisaki-san"; 148. "Time-Traveling Chisaki-san"; 149. "Chisaki-san Awakens from Her Dream"; 150. "Large Boob Panic?! At Yuragi-sou!"; 151. "The Seven Wonders of Yukemuri High School: Report 2"
18	October 4, 2019	978-4-08-882079-8	February 15, 2022	978-1-64827-509-8
152. "Oboro-san's Proposal"; 153. "Yuragi-sou in the Sights"; 154. "Everyone's Small"; 155. "Little Kogarashi-kun"; 156. "Little Kogarashi-kun Heads to Yuragi-sou"; 157. "Tenko Nadare-san Appears!"; 158. "The Tenko House and Yuragi-sou"; 159. "Kogarashi-kun's Psychic Training"; 160. "Everyone's Psychic Training"
19	December 4, 2019	978-4-08-882142-9	April 26, 2022	978-1-63858-144-4
161. "Kogarashi-kun and the Replenishing Stone"; 162. "Kogarashi-kun Gets Serious"; 163. "On the Other Hand, Yuuna and the Others"; 164. "The Reason Yuuna-san and Everyone Fight"; 165. "Kogarashi-kun the Medium"; 166. "Yuragi-sou Back to Normal"; 167. "Kogarashi-kun and the Great Danger"; 168. "The Seven Wonders of Yukemuri High School: Report 3"; 169. "Yuragi-sou Strip Rock, Paper, Scissors"
20	February 4, 2020	978-4-08-882202-0	July 19, 2022	978-1-63858-207-6
170. "Klutz No More?!"; 171. "Invasion of the Body Pillow Snatchers"; 172. "Yuuna's Macho Man Transformation"; 173. "Yuragi-sou's Ultimate Autumn Sports Festival Begins!"; 174. "An All-Kogarashi Sports Festival?!"; 175. "Yuragi-sou's Ultimate Autumn Sports Festival Ends!"; 176. "Off-Duty Sagiri"; 177. "Silent Yuragi-sou"; 178. "The Seven Wonders of Yukemuri High School: Report 4"
21	April 3, 2020	978-4-08-882251-8	November 1, 2022	978-1-63858-298-4
179. "Meowranga"; 180. "Happy Halloween, Yumesaki-sensei"; 181. "Yuuna's Surprise Party"; 182. "Oboro's Date"; 183. "Twisted Games"; 184. "Enter the Incubus!"; 185. "Yumesaki-sensei's New Look"; 186. "Tell Me, Yumesaki-sensei!"; 187. "Demon Slayer Bras"
22	June 4, 2020	978-4-08-882333-1	December 27, 2022	978-1-63858-684-5
188. "Burn! Karura-san and Matora-san"; 189. "Showdown! Karura vs. Matora"; 190. "Chisaki's Feelings"; 191. "Chisaki's Decisions"; 192. "The Culture Festival's Three Sisters?"; 193. "Yuuna Opens Up"; 194. "Kogarashi-kun Attacks"; 195. "Sagiri, a Few Years Later"; 196. "Yuragi-sou, a Few Years Later"
23	September 4, 2020	978-4-08-882406-2	April 11, 2023	978-1-63858-760-6
197. "Ryuzen Appears?!"; 198. "Continue! Sagiri-san, a Few Years Later"; 199. "Hibari. a Few Years Later"; 200. "Meandering Yuragi-sou"; 201. "Oboro-san, a Few Years Later"; 202. "Karura-sama, a Few Years Later"; 203. "Re: A Future with Chisaki"; 204. "Yuuna-san Sees"; 205. "Yuuna-san Remembers"
24	December 4, 2020	978-4-08-882496-3; 978-4-08-908385-7 (BD)	June 6, 2023	978-1-63858-877-1
206. "Genryusai, Again"; 207. "Yunohana Yuuna"; 208. "Kogarashi and the Haunted Hot Springs"; 209. "Yuuna and the Haunted Hot Springs"; Extra Content. "Hiyori-san Comes to Yuragi-sou"; Epilogue. "Everyone After All ~Yuragi-sou After Hours~"; Afterword; Final Chapter Celebration Illustrations; Costume & Settings!!

=== Anime ===
An anime adaptation of the manga was announced in the 50th issue of Weekly Shōnen Jump magazine in November 2017, later revealed to be a television series. The anime is directed by Tsuyoshi Nagasawa at Xebec, with Hideaki Koyasu handled series composition, Kyoko Taketani designed the characters, Jin Aketagawa handled sound direction and Tomoki Kikuya composed the music. The opening theme is "Momoiro Typhoon" (Note: 桃色タイフーン, lit. "Peach-Colored Typhoon") performed by Luna Haruna, while the ending theme song is "Happen" performed by cast members Miyuri Shimabukuro, Eri Suzuki, and Rie Takahashi. It aired from July 14 to September 29, 2018, and broadcast on BS11 and Tokyo MX. The series is licensed in North America by Aniplex of America and simulcast on Crunchyroll. The series ran for 12 episodes. MVM Entertainment acquired the series for distribution in the UK and Ireland.

An original video animation (OVA) episode was bundled with the manga's 11th volume which was released on July 4, 2018. A second OVA episode was bundled with the manga's 12th volume which was released on October 4, 2018. A third OVA episode was bundled with the manga's 13th volume which was released on December 4, 2018. A two-episode OVA produced by Signal.MD was bundled with the manga's 24th volume, which was released on December 4, 2020.

==== Episodes ====
No.	Title (Note: All English titles are taken from Crunchyroll.)	Original release date
1	"The Yuragi Inn's Yuuna"; Transliteration: "Yuragi-sō no Yūna-san" (Japanese: ゆらぎ荘の幽奈さん)	July 14, 2018
Kogarashi helps an elderly couple from a Youkai and asks them for the direction of Yuragi Inn. As soon as he reaches the Inn, he enters the hot spring bath and finds that the ghost is actually a girl after seeing her naked. The ghost knocks him down with a bucket and when he wakes up he meets the Inn-keeper Chitose Nakai; Drunk woman Nonko Arahabaki; Dangerous girl Sagiri Ameno and Cat-girl Yaya Fushiguro. When he returns to his room he finds that the ghost is his roommate and her name is ‌Yuuna Yunohana. He is not able to exorcise her and wants to help her to pass on. The next day an unknown person enters his room when he is out and tries to forcibly exorcise Yuuna but after hearing Yuuna's response Kogarashi helps her and beats the unknown Psychic.
2	"Yuuna and the Hot Spring Ping Pong"; Transliteration: "Onsen Takkyū no Yūna-san" (Japanese: 温泉卓球の幽奈さん)	July 21, 2018
Kogarashi finds out that Yuuna's poltergeist powers activates while she is asleep often resulting in his waking up to uncompromising situations every morning. He also finds out that the residents could actually see Yuuna causing him to question their identities. They reveal their true nature and powers when they successfully defend themselves against the exorcists of the Gudon clan. Later on, because of several misunderstandings, Kogarashi has to defend himself against being evicted. He wins, but an accident results in another embarrassing situation yet again.
3	"Yuuna Goes to School"; Transliteration: "Kasoke Yūna-san no Gakkō e Yuku" (Japanese: 幽奈さん学校へゆく)	July 28, 2018
Yuuna wakes up to find Kogarashi nowhere. She learns from Chitose that he went for his high-school opening ceremony. Yunna also leaves to see the school together with Kogarashi. No one is able to see Yuuna. Yuuna tries to examine the skirt of the most beautiful girl of the class Chisaki Miyazaki but when Kogarashi tries to stop her everyone thinks that he flipped Chisaki's skirt. During class introduction, Kogarashi declares that he is a Psychic but everyone takes it as a joke. After school Chisaki asks for his help. She tells him that the stuffed toys in her house are moving on their own. Kogarashi is able to catch the culprit who is the 10 year old tanuki-girl, Shigaraki Koyuzu, envious of Chisaki's breasts. Kogarashi helps the girl move in Yuragi Inn. Next day he gets some cookies from Chisaki as thanks and become friends with her.
OVA 1 (3.5)	"Welcome to Yuragi Inn"; Transliteration: "Yuragi sō ni yotte yōkoso" (Japanese: ゆらぎ荘にようこそ)	July 4, 2018
OVA 1 (3.5)	"Kogarashi Turns into Bubbles"; Transliteration: "Kogarashi awa to naru" (Japanese: コガラシ泡となる)	July 4, 2018
Kogarashi and Yuuna wake up and meet up with Chitose who asks Kogarashi to call the other residents of Yuragi Inn for breakfast. With the help of Yuuna he is able to call others for breakfast but is gravely injured. He then goes to his part-time job but when he returns no one is there in the Inn to welcome him. He sees Yaya's cat and follow him and finds that everyone has set up a welcome party for him. After some days Kogarashi is tasked with cleaning the hot-spring bath. While cleaning Shigaraki enters sleepwalking and turns Kogarashi into body-shampoo. He is not able to turn back to normal. Then all the residents of the Inn come to bath and Kogarashi is able to feel all of their bodies. Just when he had enough and wanted to turn back to normal, Shigaraki cancels her spell and he returns to normal only to be beaten by Sagiri.
4	"Sagiri is Watching Youkai!"; Transliteration: "Yōkai Wotchingu! Sagiri-san" (Japanese: 妖怪ウォッチング！狭霧さん)	August 4, 2018
4	"Yaya is Cautious"; Transliteration: "Yaya, Osoruosoru" (Japanese: 夜々、おそるおそる)	August 4, 2018
Sagiri is a member of the Chuuma Ninja Army who work at night to exterminate evil Youkai. She was given the task to terminate a youkai who only attacks couples. So she asks Kogarashi to accompany her. The Youkai creates smoke which destroys fibre so the couples who were attacked by the Youkai lost their clothes. Kogarashi removes the smoke and Sagiri lands the final blow and they are able to defeat the Youkai. The next day the residents of Yuragi Inn hear that Chitose is leaving for a meeting at the association of hot springs for some days. So everyone decides to take turn in making food but everyone messes up except Kogarashi who was trained by a possessed ghost to make grilled fish. After eating Kogarashi's fish Yaya follows Kogarashi everywhere even to his bath. After getting beaten by her once he learns that she wants to eat the grilled fish again, so he makes some grilled fish and takes it to her but she fed it to her Cat-God and says that she wanted her God to try the fish. From then Yaya follows Kogarashi every now and then.
5	"Yuuna's Body Measurements"; Transliteration: "Yuuna-san no Shintai Sokutei" (Japanese: 幽奈さんの身体測定)	August 11, 2018
5	"Nonko's Crunch Time"; Transliteration: "Shuraba no Nonko-san" (Japanese: 修羅場の呑子さん)	August 11, 2018
Chisaki wants to know more about Yuuna. So Kogarashi gives them an idea. Now they are able to talk to each other through writing notes. During class, Chisaki and Yuuna continue talking. Chisaki asks her where she lives. Yuuna says that both Kogarashi and she live together. Chisaki is flustered after hearing that and causes a commotion and is punished by the teacher to arrange the materials after the class. Yuuna helps Chisaki and, in return, she removes her school uniform to let Yuuna examine it. When Kogarashi enter the room they are found in an embarrassing position. Then they go to the school roof where Yuuna shows her school uniform to them. When they return home, Kogarashi learns that Nonko is a mangaka and helps her to complete her manga before the deadline. He founds that even being a drunkard she never touched alcohol while doing her work. But after she hands her work to her editor Rui Haneshima, she starts drinking again.
6	"Ms. Nakai's Secret Adventure"; Transliteration: "Nakai-san no Himitsu no Bōken" (Japanese: 仲居さんの秘密の冒険)	August 18, 2018
6	"A Sweet Day Off with Yuuna"; Transliteration: "Yūna-san to Amai Kyūjitsu" (Japanese: 幽奈さんと甘い休日)	August 18, 2018
After Kogarashi and Yuuna left for school, Chitose puts on a school uniform and sneaks out. She doesn't want anyone to find out about her going to middle school. As she moves down the stairs she sees Kogarashi and Yuuna returning because Kogarashi forgot his gym uniform. She use her power to avoid being seen by them and reaches her school. She happily spends time with her friends and after school, goes to hang out with them. Some delinquents try to hit on her and her friends but she uses her power and Kogarashi comes and saves them. She is able to hide herself from Kogarashi and goes back to being the Inn-keeper and welcomes Kogarashi home. Next day Kogarashi asks Yuuna if she wants to do something to clear her lingering regert. But Yuuna doesn't remember anything. So Chitose sets them up on a date to the newly opened hot spring Yunowal. They both go on a date but are not able to spend it like couples because Yuuna is a ghost. Kogarashi tries hard to make her fulfill her regret but all in vain. After sliding together he passes out and wakes up in the waiting lounge. Then he and Yuuna go to have a bath together where Yuuna tells him not to try very hard and she would like to come here again but on a real date.
7	"Yuuna's Mysterious Disappearance"; Transliteration: "Yūna-san no Kamigakushi" (Japanese: 幽奈さんの神隠し)	August 25, 2018
Yuuna helps Shigaraki on her first errand. Meanwhile Ryuuga and Oboro searching for a suitable spouse for Ryuuga encounters them. Ryuuga witnesses the poltergeist powers of Yuuna and announces her as her bride and takes her away to his castle. Ryuuga makes Yuuna cosplay in various costumes. And here Shigaraki finds Kogarashi and tells him everything. Kogarashi, Sagiri and Shigaraki infiltrates the castle to rescue Yuuna. Sagiri and Shigaraki moves forward while Kogarashi is caught by the guards as a decoy.
8	"Oboro Stops at Nothing"; Transliteration: "Shudan o Erabanai Oboro-san" (Japanese: 手段を選ばない朧さん)	September 1, 2018
While Kogarashi holds Ryuuga back as a decoy, Sagiri and Shigaraki sneak into the castle to save Yuuna but are attacked by Oboro. Shigaraki is able to escape thanks to Yuuna. But Oboro defeats Sagiri and takes both her and Yuuna to Ryuuga. Ryuuga decides to marry both Yuuna and Sagiri. Yuuna tries to sacrifice herself for the safety of the other two but Kogarashi interrupts and provokes Ryuuga. Angered Ryuuga kicks Kogarashi and he ends up getting hit on a mountain and falls down. Everyone thinks that he is dead but he stands up punches Ryuuga who goes flying in the sky. Oboro is not able to accept the defeat of her master and attacks Kogarashi but Nonko arrives in time and stops her. Then Kogarashi resolves the matter without fighting and they return with Yuuna. Next morning Kogarashi wakes up with Oboro by his futon asking to make a child with a strong warrior like him for the future of Ryuuga clan.
9	"Chisaki of the Yuragi Inn"; Transliteration: "Yuragi-sō no Chisaki-san" (Japanese: ゆらぎ荘の千紗希さん)	September 8, 2018
Chisaki promised Yuuna that she will visit Yuragi Inn on the weekend. When she reaches the Inn she is a bit afraid due to the Inn being called haunted. But assures herself that the ghost might be Yuuna. As soon as she opens the door she sees Oboro on top of Kogarashi trying to seduce him. Kogarashi leaves for his part-time job and says he will be back tomorrow. Yuuna introduces everyone to Chisaki and vice versa. Sagiri becomes envious of her thinking she (Chisaki) is more feminine than her (Sagiri). Chisaki is even able to cook better and is easily able to tame Yaya. Chisaki is a fan of Nonko's manga so Nonko asks Chisaki to stay over for the night. Yuuna, Chisaki and Shigaraki sleep in the same room and talks about various things. Shigaraki brings the topic of love interest but it doesn't go well and then they practice cosplay to seduce men. In the middle of night Chisaki wakes up to find Yuuna on top of her and sets her aside. When she was about to continue sleeping Kogarashi returns from his job and sleeps beside Chisaki. Oboro enters and again tries to seduce Kogarashi but he tells her he won't do it to anyone other than the one he loves and sends her back. Chisaki thinks of Kogarashi as a good man. She leaves at morning but not before warning Yuuna about her sleeping behaviour.
10	"The Overly Aggressive Sagiri"; Transliteration: "Seme sugiru Sagiri-san" (Japanese: 攻め過ぎる狭霧さん)	September 15, 2018
10	"The Seaside School and Kogarashi"; Transliteration: "Rinkai Gakkō to Kogarashi-kun" (Japanese: 臨海学校とコガラシくん)	September 15, 2018
The school plans on going on a sea-side trip. Urara Urakata, partner of Sagiri in the Chuuma Ninja Army encourages her to buy a sexy swim-suit and asks to make Kogarashi tag along. She somehow manages to ask Kogarashi to come along with her by lying him that a Youkai has appeared in the swim-suit shop. The three of them enters the shop and the two tries different swim-suit while Kogarashi attentively waits for the Youkai to appear. After choosing their swim-suits Kogarashi learns that there was no Youkai. They reach the sea and everyone goes to swim in the water. Kogarashi asks Urara if the rumor about a Youkai appearing in the sea is true or not. Then suddenly some tentacles come out from the water and captures all the girls and tears their swim-suits but Kogarashi damages the main body of the Youkai and defeats it. No one believes him to be a psychic so Chisaki and their group plans a test of courage to prove that he is a psychic.
11	"Dancing Cheek to Cheek with Yuuna"; Transliteration: "Chīku Dansu to Yūna-san" (Japanese: チークダンスと幽奈さん)	September 22, 2018
11	"Sagiri and the Final Exam"; Transliteration: "Kimatsu Tesuto to Sagiri-san" (Japanese: 期末テストと狭霧さん)	September 22, 2018
Kogarashi is partnered with Chisaki for the test of courage. Their plan to prove that Kogarashi is a Psychic fails. But then two of the students accidentally wake a strong Youkai from sleep but Kogarashi is able to stop it from attacking the students. The girls talk about the cheek-to-cheek dance the day after and the next day Yuuna tries to ask Kogarashi for escorting her but stop half way but Kogarashi interprets what she was trying to say and asks her to dance with him. When they return after the trip Kogarashi, Sagiri and Yaya starts preparing for their upcoming exams but Oboro makes a love potion by the help of Shigaraki to make Kogarashi fall in love with her but Sagiri drinks the potion and falls for Kogarashi.She climbs on top of Kogarashi and stuffs his head in her breasts. Just then the effect of the potion wears off and she becomes embarrassed and locks herself in her room.
12	"Yuuna and the Haunted Hot Springs And..."; Transliteration: "Yuragi-sō no Yūna-san to..." (Japanese: ゆらぎ荘の幽奈さんと)	September 29, 2018
Everyone leaves for their home during summer vacation, the only left residents are Kogarashi, Yuuna, Nonko and Oboro. Nonko gets a call and learns that her helper is down with a cold, so she asks the remaining members for help in return for a trip to Okinawa. After completing the manga they all go to the beach where Nonko, Oboro and Yuuna make Kogarashi rub sun-oil on their back. After an accident in which Kogarashi goes flying in the sky, he sees a ghost standing on a cliff. After investigating they found that the ghost is waiting for her dead lover to come and meet her which is also supposed to be her lingering regret. Kogarashi and Yuuna decide to help them and makes the lovers to meet up with each other. Then they are able to peacefully ascend to heaven. Kogarashi asks for the details about Yuuna life when she was alive. But she doesn't remember any thing. Kogarashi promises to make her happy and someday help her in fulfilling her lingering regret. After the vacations are over their life continues again with the same good-morning blow.
OVA–2	"Oboro-san and the Hot Springs"; Transliteration: "Yuragi sō no Oboro-san" (Japanese: ゆらぎ荘の朧さん)	October 4, 2018
OVA–2	"Miyazaki and Koyuzu: Parent and Child"; Transliteration: "Miyazaki Oyako to Koyuzu-chan" (Japanese: 宮崎親子とこゆずちゃん)	October 4, 2018
Oboro asks for advice from all the residents of Yuuragi-Inn for ways to make Kogarashi fall in love with her but everything she tries goes in vain. While taking to Oboro during bath, Yuuna realises that she is in love with Kogarashi but denies it to Oboro. Koyuzu spents her summer at the Miyazaki's. Both Chisaki and her mother get fond of Koyuzu and ask her to stay with them forever but Koyuzu kindly rejects their offer because she thinks that if she starts living with them, she will come to accept that she is not a complete adult, which she doesn't want.
OVA–3	"Yaya and the Foxtail"; Transliteration: "Yaya to Nekojarashi" (Japanese: 夜々と猫じゃらし)	December 4, 2018
OVA–3	"Oboro-san is Alright with 2 Fans"; Transliteration: "Oboro-san wa 2 oshide ī" (Japanese: 朧さんは２推しでいい)	December 4, 2018
Kogarashi is working part-time at a festival. He finds that Yaya also came to the festival because it is a festival for cat gods. Yaya asks for Kogarashi's help to make fish for the cat gods. But a cat god Amazaki comes to have revenge from Yaya for his defeat. Yaya is able to defeat the cat god with a little help from Kogarashi. Yuuna, Oboro, Miyazaki and Koyuzu talk about love and their relationship with Kogarashi. They think that Kogarashi might be into idols so they practice to become idols but Kogarashi enters the room while they are practicing but leaves soon pretending to not have seen anything.
OVA–4	"Kogarashi, Bewitched"; Transliteration: "Noroware no Kogarashi" (Japanese: 呪われのコガラシ)	December 4, 2020
OVA–4	"Last Minute!? Hot Spring Happening!"; Transliteration: "Girigiri!? Onsen Hapuningu!" (Japanese: ギリギリ!? 温泉ハプニング！)	December 4, 2020
Hibari and Sagiri were on a mission for squadron. Their target was a dangerous ghost, a spellcaster. There, Kogarashi was doing his part-time job. When he nearly defeated it, the ghost threw a powerful spell on him. Now, the spell can only remove by seeing twelve panties or he'll die.

=== Video games ===
A video game by FuRyu titled Yuuna and the Haunted Hot Springs: Steam Dungeon (Note: ゆらぎ荘の幽奈さん 湯けむり迷宮 (ダンジョン), Yuragi-sō no Yūna-san: Yukemuri Dungeon) was released for PlayStation 4 on November 15, 2018. In November 2023, FuRyu announced that they would release a new PC version of the game, titled Yuuna and the Haunted Hot Springs: The Thrilling Steamy Maze Kiwami, in English, Simplified and Traditional Chinese on Steam. In December 2023, FuRyu later announced ports for the new version on Nintendo Switch, PlayStation 5, iOS and Android. The new versions are set to release on January 18, 2024.

A smartphone game titled Yuragi-sō no Yūna-san: Dororon Onsen Daikikō (Note: 「ゆらぎ荘の幽奈さん」ドロロン温泉大紀行) began service in April 2019 and ended service on December 25, 2019.

== Reception ==
=== Critical reception ===
Rebecca Silverman of Anime News Network gave the first manga volume an overall "B" rating citing the good relationship forming between Yuuna and Kogarashi, some funny moments, and the attractive artwork. She was critical about the side characters being "mostly just annoying", and "dated tropes" that "drag things down". Sean Gaffney from A Case Suitable for Treatment gave the first manga volume a favorable review calling the main male character a “confident Jump hero in the Luffy/Soma tradition". Gaffney noted a-lot of similarities to the series To Love Ru other than this "nice change" from a passive male character, and stated that he liked the way Yuuna was "translated and adapted". Stig Høgset from THEM Anime Reviews reviewed the anime adaptation and gave it a 4/5 star rating saying that it was "old-school" for "both good and bad". Høgset said in his review that he liked the anime for its "unassuming, but still clearly noticeable character progression as more quiet slice-of-lives". He was critical though, about the mixed bag of comedy, and the main character's harassment of "a whole lot of women" even if it was unintentional. Høgset in the end said that while the series rates a "weak 4" the anime adaptation of Yuuna and the Haunted Hot Springs's "heart more than makes up for its shortcomings".

=== Controversy ===
The series attracted controversy in Japan when a "character poll" featuring "sexualized" images ran in a magazine whose readers include children. Lawyer Keiko Ōta urged parents to not let their sons read the magazine, saying that "depicting sexual harassment as pleasure is a problem." A gender studies professor at Osaku University also weighed in on the matter saying that young boys are learning to see females as sexual objects. Those in support of the magazine's images said that seeing erotic images is a necessary part of growth into adulthood. Others which include lawyer Yamato Satō expressed concerns about excessive censorship. Sculptor and manga artist Megumi Igarashi criticized the hype citing "The ego of parents who want their children to remain innocent forever." Manga artist Tatsuya Egawa also criticized the hype by comparing the images to the series Harenchi Gakuen while calling those who want to ban the content "sadly stupid".
