= Hiromi Ishikawa =

Japanese actress and voice actress

Hiromi Ishikawa (石川寛美, Ishikawa Hiromi; born November 12, 1961) is a Japanese actress and voice actress from Tokyo. She is represented by two talent agencies: 81 Produce and Caramel Box, and was formerly represented as a stage actor by Theatre Echo.

== Filmography ==
=== Television animation ===
- Bonobono - Nagareboshi-kun
- Brave Police J-Decker - Yuta Tomonaga
- Buckets de Gohan - Rīchi
- Cynical History Hour - Tsuneko
- Crayon Shin-chan - Atsuko Kutsuzoko
- Daigunder - Makoto
- Detective Conan - girl
- Dr. Slump - the Prince
- El Hazard: The Alternative World - Parnasse
- Flint the Time Detective - Rodan
- Hamtaro - Oasis-kun; Omar
- Imagination Science World Gulliver Boy - James the 2nd
- Kindaichi Shōnen no Jikenbo (1997) - Chris Einstien (ep. 13–15)
- Kurogane Communication - Spike
- Mahōjin Guru Guru - Zaza
- Mobile Suit Victory Gundam - Francesca O'Hara
- Mokke - Kazuma Hiyoshi (ep. 17)
- Nintama Rantarō - Ibuki; Naomi
- Pluster World - Harnia
- Pokémon - Tsukushi
- Romeo no Aoi Sora - Michaelo
- Shaman King - Kagami
- The Simpsons - Della
- Trapp Ikka Monogatari - Johanna
- Yamato Takeru - Manta; Namuji

=== Radio ===
- Final Fantasy Tactics Advance - Doned Radiuju
