= Colori Colore Creare =

Japanese manga series

- First tankōbon volume cover
- Genre: Science fantasy
- Manga
- Written by: Kozue Amano
- Published by: Mag Garden
- English publisher: NA: Titan Comics
- Imprint: Blade Comics
- Magazine: Mag Comi
- Original run: March 10, 2022 – present
- Volumes: 9

Colori Colore Creare is a Japanese manga series written and illustrated by Kozue Amano. It began serialization on Mag Garden's Mag Comi manga website in March 2022.

== Synopsis ==
The series is set in a town hidden by a veil called Onobori. It is centered around Aka, a girl who lives in a coffee shop with her grandfather. One day, Aka encounters a hungry cat, and decides to feed it a rice ball, then it suddenly grows.

== Publication ==
Written and illustrated by Kozue Amano, Colori Colore Creare began serialization on Mag Garden's Mag Comi manga website on March 10, 2022. Its chapters have been compiled into nine tankōbon volumes as of October 2026.

In May 2025, Titan Comics announced that they had licensed the series for English publication, with the first volume initially set for a May 2026 release.

| No. | Original release date | Original ISBN | English release date | English ISBN |
|---|---|---|---|---|
| 1 | November 10, 2022 | 978-4-8000-1262-3 | August 25, 2026 | 978-1-78774-881-1 |
1. "Rainbow Fanfare"; 2. "The God's Name"; 3. "Beginner's Badge"; 4. "Singin' in the Rain"; 5. "A Faraway City"
| 2 | April 10, 2023 | 978-4-8000-1319-4 | January 5, 2027 | 978-1-78774-882-8 |
| 3 | October 10, 2023 | 978-4-8000-1374-3 | — | — |
| 4 | April 10, 2024 | 978-4-8000-1437-5 | — | — |
| 5 | October 9, 2024 | 978-4-8000-1509-9 | — | — |
| 6 | April 10, 2025 | 978-4-8000-1575-4 | — | — |
| 7 | October 9, 2025 | 978-4-8000-1645-4 | — | — |
| 8 | April 10, 2026 | 978-4-8000-1730-7 | — | — |
| 9 | October 8, 2026 | 978-4-8000-1818-2 | — | — |

== Reception ==
The series was ranked 6th in the fourth Sanyodo Bookstore Comic Awards in 2023.
