= Amanchu! =

Japanese manga series

- First tankōbon volume cover

あまんちゅ！
- Genre: Slice of life
- Manga
- Written by: Kozue Amano
- Published by: Mag Garden
- Magazine: Monthly Comic Blade
- Original run: 29 November 2008 – 10 May 2021
- Volumes: 17
- Anime television series
- Directed by: Junichi Sato; Kenichi Kasai
- Produced by: Hisao Iizuka; Satoshi Suzuki; Ito Masaki; Asuka Yamazaki; Kaneko Hirotaka; Yasuaki Ogawa
- Written by: Deko Akao
- Music by: Gontiti
- Studio: J.C.Staff
- Licensed by: Crunchyroll (expired): UK: Anime Limited
- Original network: AT-X, Tokyo MX, Sun TV, SBS, KBS, BS11
- Original run: 8 July 2016 – 23 September 2016
- Episodes: 12 + OVA
- Anime television series

Amanchu! Advance
- Directed by: Junichi Sato; Kiyoko Sayama
- Written by: Deko Akao; Hiroko Fukuda
- Music by: Gontiti
- Studio: J.C.Staff
- Licensed by: Crunchyroll (expired)
- Original network: AT-X, Tokyo MX, BS11
- Original run: 7 April 2018 – 23 June 2018
- Episodes: 12

Amanchu! (あまんちゅ！) is a Japanese manga series written and illustrated by Kozue Amano. It was serialized in Mag Garden's Monthly Comic Blade magazine from November 2008 to May 2021, with its chapters collected in 17 tankōbon volumes. An anime television series adaptation by J.C.Staff aired between July and September 2016. The second season of the anime series aired between April and June 2018.

== Plot ==
Futaba Ooki, a shy girl who just moved in from the city to the oceanside town of Shizuoka, meets Hikari Kohinata, an erratic girl who loves scuba diving. Together, they join their school's Diving Club and discover the joys of underwater exploration.

== Characters ==
Hikari Kohinata (小日向 光, Kohinata Hikari)
Voiced by: Eri Suzuki
An energetic girl who loves scuba diving. She's usually an absent-minded person, although she can be pretty insightful at times, especially when it comes to noticing how people feel. Being the kind of girl with a unique world view, she ends up dragging her friends along for her activities, usually making people discover new things. She usually says "Happyan~" when impressed or curious. She is nicknamed "Pikari" by her friends.
Futaba Ooki (大木 双葉, Ōki Futaba)
Voiced by: Ai Kayano
A girl who moved in from the city and joins the Diving Club on one of Hikari's impulses, even not knowing how to swim. She is an introverted person, and lacks self-confidence to the point of being let down by the smallest of failures. Usually being scared of new experiences, she's usually bound to follow Hikari's impulses to attain such. They eventually become best friends. She is nicknamed "Teko" by Hikari.
Ai Ninomiya (二宮 愛, Ninomiya Ai)
Voiced by: Saori Ōnishi
An upperclassman in the Diving Club. She's usually well-spirited and hot-blooded, although when put in romantic situations, she can show a softer side. She's usually the comic relief of the series, acting violently toward her younger brother, but deep inside she cares a lot for him.
Makoto Ninomiya (二宮 誠, Ninomiya Makoto)
Voiced by: Yūichirō Umehara
Ai's younger brother, who is also in the Diving Club. Being more calm-minded than his older sister, he's usually the comic relief character, being the main aim of Ai's violence.
Mato Katori (火鳥 真斗, Katori Mato)
Voiced by: Shizuka Itō
Hikari and Futaba's homeroom teacher and the advisor of the Diving Club. An experienced scuba diver and dedicated teacher. Although strict and serious, she firmly believes that practical work and self-discovery are important to every person's development.
Aria (ありあ) / Advisor Cha (ちゃ顧問, Cha-Komon)
Voiced by: Yurika Kubo
A cat who hangs around the Diving Club's room. Sometimes it's seen wearing a diaper or a small cape.
Ohime (お姫, Ohime)
Voiced by: Aya Suzaki
A small kitten that hangs around with Aria in the Diving Club's room. She was saved from a bunch of crows by Hikari and Futaba when she was a stray. With Hikari unable to find someone to adopt her, the principal stepped in to care for her and give Aria somebody to socialize with.
Kino Kohinata (小日向きの, Kohinata Kino)
Voiced by: Kikuko Inoue
Hikari's grandmother who runs a scuba diving gear rental shop by the beach.
Kokoro Misaki (岬こころ, Misaki Kokoro)
Voiced by: Ai Yamamoto
Kotori Misaki (岬ことり, Misaki Kotori)
Voiced by: Ai Kakuma
Kodama Kohinata (小日向こだま, Kohinata Kodama)
Voiced by: Aya Suzaki

== Media ==
=== Manga ===
Written and illustrated by Kozue Amano, Amanchu! was serialized in Mag Garden's shōnen manga magazine Monthly Comic Blade from 29 November 2008 to 10 May 2021. Mag Garden collected its chapters in seventeen tankōbon volumes, released from 10 August 2009 to 10 November 2021.

==== Volumes ====
No.	Japanese release date	Japanese ISBN
1	10 August 2009	978-4-86127-642-2
2	10 February 2010	978-4-86127-696-5
3	10 August 2010	978-4-86127-757-3
4	10 March 2012	978-4-86127-960-7
5	10 October 2012	978-4-80000-051-4
6	10 May 2013	978-4-80000-147-4; ISBN 978-4-8000-0101-6 (LE)
7	9 November 2013	978-4-80000-227-3; ISBN 978-4-8000-0233-4 (LE)
8	10 May 2014	978-4-80000-301-0; ISBN 978-4-8000-0279-2 (LE)
9	10 February 2015	978-4-80000-410-9
10	9 July 2016	978-4-80000-599-1; ISBN 978-4-8000-0569-4 (LE)
11	10 September 2016	978-4-80000-610-3; ISBN 978-4-8000-0570-0 (LE)
12	10 April 2018	978-4-80000-756-8; ISBN 978-4-8000-0738-4 (LE)
13	9 June 2018	978-4-80000-780-3; ISBN 978-4-8000-0780-3 (LE)
14	10 April 2019	978-4-8000-0842-8
15	10 December 2019	978-4-8000-0919-7
16	27 February 2021	978-4-8000-1054-4; ISBN 978-4-8000-0965-4 (LE)
17	10 November 2021	978-4-8000-1142-8; ISBN 978-4-8000-0966-1 (LE)

=== Anime ===
A 12-episode anime television series adaptation aired between 8 July 2016 and 23 September 2016 and was simulcast by Crunchyroll. The series is directed by Junichi Sato and Kenichi Kasai, and written by Deko Akao. It is produced by animation studio J.C.Staff, with character designs by Yoko Ito. The music was composed by Gontiti and produced by Flying Dog. The opening theme song is "Million Clouds" by Maaya Sakamoto, while the ending song titled "Futari Shōjo" (ふたり少女, lit. Two Girls) is sung by Tekopikari, a duo consists of Eri Suzuki and Ai Kayano. An original video animation was included in the seventh Blu-ray/DVD volume released on 29 March 2017, later releasing on Crunchyroll on 12 October 2017. The series has been renewed with a second season titled Amachu! Advance. It aired between 7 April 2018 and 23 June 2018. The second season's opening theme is "Crosswalk" by Minori Suzuki and the ending theme is "Hello, Hello" by Maaya Sakamoto, and an insert song "Tieleusha" by Mina Kubota. Most of the staff returned, as Kiyoko Sayama replaced Kenichi Kasai as director. It also ran for 12 episodes. Crunchyroll streamed the second season.

==== Amanchu! ====
No.	English title (Note: All English titles are taken from Crunchyroll.) Original Japanese title	Original release date
1	"The Story of the Girl and the Ocean"; Transliteration: "Shōjo to Umi no Koto" (Japanese: 少女と海のコト)	8 July 2016
Futaba Ooki, a shy girl who had just moved from Tokyo to the beachside town of Shizuoka, catches the eye of her eccentric classmate, Hikari Kohinata, who instantly befriends her.
2	"The Story of Doing Something Bad With Hikari"; Transliteration: "Hikari to Ikenai Koto" (Japanese: 光といけないコト)	15 July 2016
On her way to school, Hikari races against her homeroom teacher, Mato Katori, who she discovers to be a fellow scuba diver. Later that day, Hikari drags Futaba to the school's Diving Club, where they try on some drysuits and take a dip in the pool. Moved by Hikari's high spirits, Futaba decides to join her in diving.
3	"The Story of the Secret to Excitement and Happiness"; Transliteration: "Wakuwaku to Shiawase no Kotsu no Koto" (Japanese: ワクワクと幸せのコツのコト)	22 July 2016
Hikari leads Futaba to a road filled with cherry blossom trees to cheer her up. The next day, Hikari and Futaba sign up for the Diving Club, where Mato, the club's advisor, teaches Futaba about air pressure and ear equalization.
4	"The Story of Excitement and the Despairing Heart"; Transliteration: "Wakuwaku to Akirameru Kokoro no Koto" (Japanese: ワクワクと諦める心のコト)	29 July 2016
Futaba comes to observe a scuba diving class run by Hikari's grandmother, Kino. The next day, Futaba has her first experience diving in the school's pool, struggling to keep water out of her eye mask and losing confidence. However, with Hikari's guiding her as her buddy, she begins to get used to being underwater, managing to go to the deepest parts of the pool.
5	"The Story of the First Time at Sea With Friends"; Transliteration: "Nakama to Hajimete no Umi no Koto" (Japanese: 仲間と初めての海のコト)	5 August 2016
Noticing Futaba struggling with strength, Mato has her and Hikari go jogging to build up strength. Along the way, they come across some students from diving school, Ai and Makoto Ninomiya, who turn out to be their upperclassmen in the Diving Club. After a hectic first meeting, Ai holds a meeting to discuss how Futaba will be aiming for an Open Water Diver Certification, which somehow ends in a chalk drawing session.
6	"The Story of the False Wish"; Transliteration: "Honto janai Negai no Koto" (Japanese: ホントじゃない願いのコト)	12 August 2016
Futaba undergoes a pool course at the indoor pool, managing to properly learn how to clear her mask. However, it soon becomes apparent that Futaba doesn't actually know how to swim. Following the lesson, Mato takes Futaba and Hikari on a drive, where Futaba thanks Hikari for helping her find her own wish.
7	"The Story of the End of Rain"; Transliteration: "Ame no Owari no Koto" (Japanese: 雨のおわりのコト)	19 August 2016
7	"The Story of the Beginning of Summer"; Transliteration: "Natsu no Hajimari no Koto" (Japanese: 夏のはじまりのコト)	19 August 2016
On a rainy day, Mato decides to follow Hikari as she boards a train, discovering that her only reason for doing so was to witness some blooming hydrangeas for a brief instant. Later, on a particularly hot day, Mato has the club play red light green light as punishment for skipping on their exam studies.
8	"The Story of the Feelings Yet Hidden"; Transliteration: "Himeta Omoi no Koto" (Japanese: 秘めた思いのコト)	26 August 2016
8	"The Story of Things Yet Unknown"; Transliteration: "Madamada Shiranai Koto" (Japanese: まだまだ知らないコト)	26 August 2016
Makoto becomes concerned when Ai receives what appears to be a love letter from her classmate, only to later find it was addressed to another girl. Later, as Futaba and Hikari take part in various fitness exams, Hikari helps Futaba improve her self-confidence during the 1000m run.
9	"The Story of the Memories You Can't Erase"; Transliteration: "Kesenai Omoide no Koto" (Japanese: 消せない思い出のコト)	2 September 2016
Futaba, who always takes photos to remember each moment, becomes shocked when her phone's memory has become full, requiring her to delete or move her old photos, including those of her friends from Tokyo. As Futaba finds herself unable to delete any of her old photos to make room for new memories, Hikari and the others buy her a digital photo frame to store all of her photos, both old and new.
10	"The Story of Losing Your Way in Today"; Transliteration: "Kyō to Iu Tsuitachi o Mayō Koto" (Japanese: 今日という一日を迷うコト)	9 September 2016
Futaba and Hikari invite Ai to hang out with them as they go shopping for logbooks and swimsuits. Afterwards, the girls go to the beach, where Futaba tells Kino about all the things she has learned since meeting Hikari. Futaba expresses her concerns about whether she can become a suitable buddy for Hikari, though Hikari expresses that she's had times when she lost her way as well, saying that it is a chance to have more fun. Afterwards, Futaba finally manages to pass the pool course, allowing her to move on to the Open Diver course with everyone.
11	"The Story of the Cat and the Kitten"; Transliteration: "Neko to Koneko no Koto" (Japanese: 猫と子猫のコト)	16 September 2016
Futaba and Hikari follow the club's mascot, Cha, leading them to take a path that neither of them has been down before. Along the way, they come across a small kitten that appears to have been separated from her mother. With neither girl able to take the kitten in, they decide to ask around at school for a potential owner, eventually getting found by Mato, who reminds them of responsibility involved in taking care of a life. Hearing Futaba wants to help the kitten like she helped her, Hikari convinces her mother to let the kitten stay at her house until they can find an owner. Just then, the school's principal, who is Cha's owner, decides to take in the kitten, who is given the name Ohime.
12	"The Story of the Blue World"; Transliteration: "Aoi Sekai no Koto" (Japanese: 青い世界のコト)	23 September 2016
The Open Diver course begins, with Futaba and Hikari paired up as buddies. Futaba loses one of her fins on the way to the descent point, but it gets picked up by another diver, turning her fears of the unknown world beneath her into excitement. Guided by the bubbles of the other divers, Futaba reaches the bottom of the ocean floor, wowed by the scenery and sealife spread out before her. Clearing all the tasks before her, Futaba passes the course with flying colors and becomes a fully-fledged Open Diver. Afterwards, Futaba and Hikari thank each other for everything that's happened since they became friends.
13 (OVA)	"The Story of the Promised Summer and New Memories"; Transliteration: "Yakusoku no Natsu to Atarashī Omoide no Koto" (Japanese: 約束の夏と新しい思い出のコト)	29 March 2017
Futaba's friends from her old school, Chizuru and Akane, come to Izu to pay her a visit. As Hikari and Kino give them a tour of the town, Chizuru starts to feel jealous over how close Futaba is with Hikari. The next day, Chizuru and Akane are invited to take part in a beginner's diving course. In her eagerness to keep up with Futaba, Chizuru experiences severe pain from forgetting to equalize her ears. Thankfully, she is helped out by Hikari, who leads her the rest of the way and shows her the beauty of the ocean. Afterwards, Chizuru gives Hikari her gratitude and apologises for her attitude towards her before returning home with Akane, promising to come again someday.

==== Amanchu! Advance ====
No.	English title Original Japanese title	Original release date
1	"The Story of One Summer Night and a Confession"; Transliteration: "Aru Natsu no Yoru to Kokuhaku no Koto" (Japanese: ある夏の夜と告白のコト)	7 April 2018
After helping out at Kino's beach house during a lunch rush, Futaba decides to return there the next day while Hikari goes scuba diving with the others. While there, Hikari accidentally goes into an outdoor hot spring without her bikini top, putting her at risk of being exposed before the other girls come to save her. Later, after Hikari holds a barbecue party for everyone, Futaba worries about what she'd do if she has to part ways with Hikari, but Hikari encourages her to enjoy every moment they spend together.
2	"The Story of Midsummer and Sparkling Eyes"; Transliteration: "Natsu no Mannaka to Kirakira no Hitomi no Koto" (Japanese: 夏の真ん中とキラキラの瞳のこと)	14 April 2018
3	"The Story of the Pro and the Expert of Happiness"; Transliteration: "Shiawase no Puro to Tatsujin no Koto" (Japanese: 幸せのプロと達人のコト)	21 April 2018
4	"The Story of Autumn and a Tender Happiness"; Transliteration: "Aki to Fuwari hito no Shiawase no Koto" (Japanese: 秋とふわり人の幸せのコト)	28 April 2018
5	"The Story of the Jet-Black Mermaid and the Solitude of 18m Under"; Transliteration: "Shikkoku no Ningyo to 18m no Kodoku no Koto" (Japanese: 漆黒の人魚と18mの孤独のコト)	5 May 2018
6	"The Story of a Halloween Night's Dream"; Transliteration: "Harowin no Yoru no Yume no Koto" (Japanese: ハロウィーンの夜の夢の物語)	12 May 2018
7	"The Story of the Neverending School Festival"; Transliteration: "Eien no Gakuensai no Koto" (Japanese: 永遠のガクエンサイのコト)	19 May 2018
8	"The Story of Fleeting, Unfulfilled Desires"; Transliteration: "Todokanai Hakanai Omoi no Koto" (Japanese: 届かない儚いオモイのコト)	26 May 2018
9	"The Story of Tears and an Endless Dream"; Transliteration: "Owari no Nai yume to Namida no Koto" (Japanese: 終わりのない夢とナミダのコト)	2 June 2018
10	"The Story of a New Beginning and New Feelings"; Transliteration: "Sono Hajimari ni Omou Koto" (Japanese: そのはじまりに想うコト)	9 June 2018
11	"The Story of Cold, Flames and Well Wishes"; Transliteration: "Kaze to Honō to o medeu to no Koto" (Japanese: 風邪と炎とおめでうとのコト)	16 June 2018
12	"The Story of Future possibilities" Transliteration: "Itsu ka, mada shiranai asu no koto" (Japanese: いつか、まだ知らない明日のコト)	23 June 2018
