= Katana Maidens: Toji No Miko =

Japanese anime television series

- Key visual

刀使ノ巫女 (Toji No Miko)
- Genre: Adventure, fantasy
- Created by: Gokaden Keikaku
- Manga
- Written by: Sakae Saito
- Published by: Kadokawa Shoten
- Magazine: Monthly Shōnen Ace
- Original run: October 26, 2017 – March 26, 2019
- Volumes: 3
- Anime television series
- Directed by: Kōdai Kakimoto
- Written by: Tatsuya Takahashi
- Music by: Yukari Hashimoto
- Studio: Studio Gokumi
- Licensed by: Crunchyroll (streaming); SA / SEA: Medialink
- Original network: AT-X, Tokyo MX, MBS, BS11
- Original run: January 5, 2018 – June 22, 2018
- Episodes: 24
- Video game

Katana Maidens ~ Toji No Miko: Kizamishi Issen no Tomoshibi
- Developer: Game Studio
- Publisher: Square Enix
- Directed by: Ishiyama Takanari
- Produced by: Takanori Shīna
- Music by: Kazuki Yanagawa
- Genre: Visual novel
- Platform: iOS 9.0 and above, Android 4.1 and above
- Released: March 19, 2018
- Anime television series

Mini Toji
- Directed by: Yuu Nobuta
- Written by: Aoi Akashiro
- Studio: Project No.9
- Licensed by: Crunchyroll (streaming); SA / SEA: Medialink
- Original network: AT-X, Tokyo MX, BS11, MBS
- Original run: January 12, 2019 – March 16, 2019
- Episodes: 10
- Novel
- Written by: Aoi Akashiro
- Published by: Shueisha
- Imprint: JUMP j-BOOKS
- Published: July 19, 2019
- Original video animation

Katana Maidens – Tomoshibi
- Directed by: Tomohiro Kamitani
- Written by: Aoi Akashiro
- Music by: Yukari Hashimoto; Kazuki Yanagawa
- Studio: Project No.9
- Licensed by: SA / SEA: Medialink
- Released: October 25, 2020 – November 29, 2020
- Runtime: 24 minutes
- Episodes: 2
- icon

Katana Maidens: Toji No Miko (刀使ノ巫女, Toji No Miko; lit. 'Sword-wielding Shrine Maidens') is a Japanese anime television series produced by Genco, co-produced by Crunchyroll, and animated by Studio Gokumi.

== Plot ==
The story is centered around a group of sword-wielding shrine maidens called Toji, who attend school while improving their extermination skills and serve as a unit in the police force in order to exorcise mysterious, hostile creatures known only as aradama. The government authorizes the Toji to wear swords and serve as government officials, and the government has set up five schools throughout the country for the girls to attend. The girls live ordinary school lives, while occasionally performing their duties, wielding their swords and using various powers to fight and protect the people. In the spring, the five schools send their best Toji to compete in a tournament. As the tournament concludes in an unexpected fashion shortly into the series, a multi-layered conflict starts to unfold and develop involving different factions of Toji and aradama, and its mysterious background slowly unveils following from near the end of World War II.

== Characters ==
=== Main characters ===
Kanami Eto (衛藤 可奈美, Etō Kanami)
Voiced by: Kaede Hondo (Japanese); Sarah Wiedenheft (English)
Portrayed by: Makiko Saito
Kanami is a second-year student in the middle school division of Minoseki Academy. She is a friend of Mai. She is a cheerful and positive girl who has many friends, and is a kenjutsu enthusiast. Her fighting style is the Yagyū Shinkage-ryū style. Wields the katana, Chidori. She later helps stab Princess Tagitsu with Hiyori, and gets stuck in the netherworld for two months before she manages to return following a reunion with her mom.
Hiyori Jujo (十条 姫和, Jūjō Hiyori)
Voiced by: Saori Ōnishi (Japanese); Jeannie Tirado (English)
Portrayed by: Marika Tani
Hiyori is a 14-year-old girl who studies in Heijou Institute as a third-year middle school student. As a Toji, she is often seen wearing the uniform of Heijou Institute. She has a serious, cool and stoic personality, has a strong sense of duty and will do anything to achieve what she has decided to do. Her mother, former Toji Kagari Juujou, died when she was small, and she has since carried a grudge against the Origami Family. Her fighting style is the Kashima Shintō-ryū style. Wields the katana, Kogarasumaru.
Mai Yanase (柳瀬 舞衣, Yanase Mai)
Voiced by: Azumi Waki (Japanese); Bryn Apprill (English)
Portrayed by: Yoshino Kitagawa
Mai is a middle school second year student from Minoseki Academy as well as Kanami's friend. She has purple hair and green eyes and she is from a rich family. She possesses an older-sister like tendency to take care of others, and always thinks about her friends. At school, she possesses great skill in swordsmanship. Her fighting style is the Hokushin Ittō-ryū style. Wields the katana, Magoroku Kanemoto.
Sayaka Itomi (糸見 沙耶香, Itomi Sayaka)
Voiced by: Hina Kino (Japanese); Apphia Yu (English)
Portrayed by: Saki Takeuchi
Sayaka is a first year student in the middle division of Renpu Girls' School. Despite being young, she is a genius Toji. She handles her duties with ease, but she has a hard time communicating with the people around her. Her fighting style is the Ono-ha Itto-ryū style. Wields the katana, Myoho Muramasa.
Kaoru Mashiko (益子 薫, Mashiko Kaoru)
Voiced by: Risae Matsuda (Japanese); Lara Woodhull (English)
Portrayed by: Sakina Kuwae
Kaoru is a first year high school student of Osafune Girls' Academy. She is 15 years old – among the oldest of the group in the first season. She is typically seen as a sluggish girl that always conserves her energy, which is later explained due to being overworked. In combat, she is a power fighter who effortlessly uses a large sword despite her petite build. She relies on Ellen a lot. Her fighting style is the Yakumaru Jigen-ryū style. Wields the katana, Nenekirimaru.
Ellen Kohagura (古波蔵 エレン, Kohagura Eren)
Voiced by: Eri Suzuki (Japanese); Alexis Tipton (English)
Portrayed by: Rimo Hasegawa
Ellen is a first year high school student of Osafune Girls' Academy, and like Kaoru, she is also 15 years old. She is half-Japanese, with a Japanese father and an American mother. She has a good relationship with Kaoru as a partner. She immediately acts friendly to people she meets, and has a tendency to make up nicknames to anyone she meets in combat. Her fighting style is the Taisha-ryū style. Wields the katana, Echizen Yasutsugu.

==== Original Video Animation ====
Several new characters are introduced in this ova, where they are the main characters. This OVA adapts the game entitled "Toji No Miko: Kizamishi Issen no Tomoshibi" which has many differences from the anime including the character who plays the main character and this OVA is also referred to as the anime sequel although there are clear contradictions between the story and the end of season 1 of the anime with this OVA.

Mihono Asakura (安桜 美炎, Asakura Mihono)
Voiced by: Himika Akaneya
Mihono is a first year high student from Minoseki Academy. An apprentice to Kanami, she is one of the duelist in the competition, which she lost. She later promises to Kanami for a rematch. She is the first to see Kanami and Hiyori return from the other world back to the current reality. Wields the kanata, Kashuu Kiyomitsu. (This is the story of the game version which is of course different from the anime)
Kiyoka Musumi (六角 清香, Musumi Kiyoka)
Voiced by: Akane Fujita
A second year student and an apprentice to Hiyori. The daughter of a noble family, she is a talented swordswoman with a promising future, but she is in fact shy and timid, and also dislikes fighting, hence she does not like becoming a Toji, only enters it because of the family's pressure. She likes romance novels and magazines. Wields the katana, Renge Fudou Teruhiro.
Kofuki Shichinosato (七之里 呼吹, Shichinosato Kofuki)
Voiced by: Hiromi Igarashi
A third year student from Renpu Girls' School. She is a girl with a straightforward manner of speaking and a tendency to move according to what she wants. She likes to exterminate Aradama, and takes delight in the act itself. She is one of the school's top student, but she has a tendency of going alone, thus she is inexperienced in teamwork tactics. She is special for wielding not just one, but two types of katana, Chatan Nakiri and Niou Kiyotsuna.
Mirja Kitora (木寅ミルヤ, Kitora Miruya)
Voiced by: Manami Numakura
A second year high school student from Ayanokouji Martial Arts School. Of Nordic origin, she is 16 years old. She is a commander figure who shows great ability in analyzing situations and devising the most suitable strategies in combat. She is also a cool beauty whose devotion serves as a sharp contrast to her duties. On the other hand, she is also an addicted otaku who knows Toji's signature traits from memory and will talk about it with sparkling eyes when it becomes the topic. Wields the katana, Jikkyuu Mitsutada.
Chie Setouchi (瀬戸内 智恵, Setouchi Chie)
Voiced by: Kaori Ishihara
A third year high school student from Osafune Girls' Academy and of 17 years old, making her the oldest of her group. She is Mihono's childhood friend and acts as a sister-like figure. Originally from Gifu, she moved to Okayama before her middle school year. Wields the katana, Sohayanotsurugi.

=== Origami Family staff ===
Yukari Origami (折神 紫, Origami Yukari)
Voiced by: Asami Seto (Japanese); Katelyn Barr (English)
Portrayed by: Ryoha Kitagawa
Yukari is the current head of the Origami Family and the chief of the National Police Agency Special Sword Administration Bureau. She wields two katana, Okanehira and Dojigiri Yasutsuna and her fighting style is the Niten Ichi-ryū style. During the Tragedy of Sagami Bay she served as the commanding officer of the special duty team and defeated the great Aradama, later becoming the great hero.
Maki Shido (獅童 真希, Shidō Maki)
Voiced by: Yumi Uchiyama (Japanese); Morgan Garrett (English)
Maki is the first-seat member of the Origami Family Elite Guard and Yukari's bodyguard. She graduated from Heijou Institute. She is the commander of Aradama operations. Her fighting style is the Shindō Munen-ryū style. Wields the katana, Usumidori (Hoemaru).
Suzuka Konohana (此花 寿々花, Konohana Suzuka)
Voiced by: M.A.O (Japanese); Jill Harris (English)
Suzuka is the second-seat member of the Origami Family Elite Guard. Her fighting style is the Kurama-ryū style. Wields the katana, Kujikanesada.
Yomi Satsuki (皐月 夜見, Satsuki Yomi)
Voiced by: Mai Fuchigami (Japanese); Felecia Angelle (English)
Yomi is the third-seat member of the Origami Family Elite Guard. Her fighting style is the Shinjin-ryū style.
Yume Tsubakuro (燕 結芽, Tsubakuro Yume)
Voiced by: Inori Minase (Japanese); Jad Saxton (English)
Yume is the fourth-seat member of the Origami Family Elite Guard. Yume possesses the highest proficiency in swordsmanship. She is a genius Toji whose ability exceeds that of Maki, a two-time successive tournament champion. Her fighting style is the Tennen Rishin-ryū style. Wields the katana, Nikkari Ao'e.
Yukina Takatsu (高津 雪那, Takatsu Yukina)
Voiced by: Yukana^{Ep. 3 credits} (Japanese); Trina Nishimura^{Ep. 3 credits (English)} (English)
Yukina is the President of Renpu Girls School. A woman with a sharp tongue and an impatient personality, Yukina lashes out at anyone who displeases her or the head of the Origami Family. In the end she will do something she will probably regret for the rest of her life
Princess Tagitsu (タギツヒメ, Tagitsuhime)
Voiced by: Rina Hidaka^{Ep. 16 credits} (Japanese); Monica Rial^{Ep. 16 credits (English)} (English)
One part of the great Aradama that possessed Yukari Origami. She wants to destroy all humans.

=== Supporting characters ===
Ema Hashima (羽島 江麻, Hashima Ema)
Voiced by: Mai Nakahara^{Ep. 2 credits} (Japanese); Mikaela Krantz^{Ep. 2 credits (English)} (English)
Ema is the President of Minoseki Academy.
Iroha Gojou (五條いろは, Gojou Iroha)
Voiced by: Satsuki Yukino^{Ep. 2 credits} (Japanese); Anastasia Muñoz^{Ep. 2 credits (English)} (English)
Iroha is the President of Heijou Institute.
Sana Maniwa (真庭紗南, Maniwa Sana)
Voiced by: Romi Park^{Ep. 4 credits} (Japanese); Caitlin Glass^{Ep. 4 credits (English)} (English)
She is the President of Osafune Girl's Academy. She is a member of Mokusa, an organization that opposes Yukari Origami.
Akane Origami (折神 朱音, Origami Akane)
Voiced by: Ayako Kawasumi^{Ep. 7 credits} (Japanese); Jessica Cavanagh^{Ep. 7 credits (English)} (English)
Yukari's younger sister. She is the leader of Mokusa.
Richard Friedman (リッチャード・フリードマン, Furiidoman Ricchaado)
Voiced by: Mitsuaki Hoshino^{Ep. 7 credits} (Japanese); Mark Stoddard^{Ep. 7 credits (English)} (English)
Ellen's grandfather and inventor of the S-Equipment. Like Sana and Akane, he is also a member of Mokusa. He also reveals about the mysterious Project S following the end of World War II.
Rui Onda (恩田 累, Onda Rui)
Voiced by: Kanomi Izawa^{Ep. 3 credits} (Japanese); Kristi Kang^{Ep. 3 credits (English)} (English)
Rui is a former Toji and an acquaintance of the Ema Hashima. She works at Yahata Electronics, a company that works in the development of S-Equipment, as a system developer. She is also a member of Mokusa, and during the pursuit of Kanami Etou and Hiyori Juujou, Rui warmly welcomes the two girls into her house by request of President Hashima.

=== Other characters ===
Nene (ねね)
Voiced by: Satsumi Matsuda^{Ep. 1 credits} (Japanese); Kate Oxley^{Ep. 1 credits (English)} (English)
The pet of Kaoru Mashiko, a tamed aradama.
Ayumu Uchizato (内里 歩, Uchizato Ayumu)
Voiced by: Hitomi Ōwada^{Ep. 13 credits} (Japanese); Megan Shipman^{Ep. 13 credits (English)} (English)
A middle school girl who looks up to Kanami and desires to be a strong Toji.
Princess Takiri (タキリヒメ, Takirihime)
Voiced by: Chiwa Saitō^{Ep. 16 credits} (Japanese); Amber Lee Connors^{Ep. 16 credits (English)} (English)
Another part of the great Aradama that possessed Yukari Origami. She wants to rule over all humans.
Princess Ichikishima (イチキシマヒメ, Ichikishimahime)
Voiced by: Eri Kitamura^{Ep. 17 credits} (Japanese); Jamie Marchi^{Ep. 17 credits (English)} (English)
A third part of the great Aradama that possessed Yukari Origami. Soft-spoken and self-depreciating, she feels inferior to Tagitsu and Takiri.
Yuzuki Souraku (相楽 結月, Souraku Yuzuki)
Voiced by: Ami Koshimizu^{Ep. 8 credits} (Japanese); Michelle Rojas^{Ep. 8 credits (English)} (English)
Yuzuki is President of Ayanokouji Martial Arts School.
Kagari Hiiragi (柊篝, Hīragi Kagari)
Voiced by: Risa Taneda^{Ep. 8 credits} (Japanese); Madeleine Morris^{Ep. 8 credits (English)}, Colleen Clinkenbeard^{Ep. 11 credits (English)} (English)
Hiyori's mother. Before she died, she told Hiyori the truth of Yukari's possession by a great aradama.
Minato Fujiwara (藤原美奈都, Fujiwara Minato)
Voiced by: Shizuka Itō^{Ep. 2 credits} (Japanese); Elisa Annette^{Ep. 2 credits (English)} (English)
Kanami's mother who passes away prior to the main series. Her younger self often appears in Kanami's dreams to provide advice and training.

== Media ==
=== Manga ===
A manga adaptation written by Sakae Saito began serialization in the December 2017 issue of Kadokawa Shoten's Monthly Shōnen Ace on October 26. In February 2019, it was announced that the manga would end on March 26.

No.	Release date	ISBN
1	December 26, 2017	978-4-04-106499-3
2	May 26, 2018	978-4-04-106844-1
3	April 26, 2019	978-4-04-107905-8

=== Mobile game ===
A mobile game developed by Game Studio and published by Square Enix titled Katana Maidens ~ Toji No Miko: Kizamishi Issen no Tomoshibi was announced and released on iOS and Android devices in 2018. The cast reprised their roles and the game used Yoshinori Shizuma's character designs. The game server itself was shut down in October 2021.

=== Anime ===
The anime is co-produced between Genco and Studio Gokumi. Kodai Kakimoto directed the series, while Tatsuya Takahashi is in charge of scripts and Yoshinori Shizuma is the original character designer. Kaede Hondo, Saori Ōnishi, Azumi Waki, Hina Kino, Risae Matsuda and Eri Suzuki performed both the first opening theme "Save Me Save You" and the first ending theme "Kokoro no Memoria" (心のメモリア). They also performed the second opening theme "Shinkakei Colors" (進化系Colors) and the second ending theme "Mirai Epilogue" (未来エピローグ). The series aired from January 5 to June 22, 2018. It ran for 24 episodes. Crunchyroll streamed the series, while Funimation produced an English dub. Medialink licensed the series in Asia-Pacific.

A new anime television series titled Mini Toji, featuring mini versions of the characters from the series and the Toji no Miko: Kizamishi Issen no Tomoshibi smartphone game, aired from January 12 to March 16, 2019, on AT-X, Tokyo MX, BS11, and MBS. The series is animated by Project No.9 and directed by Yuu Nobuta, with Aoi Akashiro handled the series' scripts, and Hiromi Ogata designed the characters. The main cast reprised their roles. The opening theme is "Kono Bangumi wa Ura Wakaki Kōmuin-tachi no Teikyō de Okuri Itashimasu" (この番組はうら若き公務員たちの提供でお送りいたします, This Program is Made Possible By Young Government Workers) by Kaede Hondo and Himika Akaneya under their character names. The series ran for 11 episodes. Crunchyroll streamed the series. Medialink licensed the series in Asia-Pacific.

On December 18, 2019, an OVA adaptation of the Katana Maidens ~ Toji No Miko: Kizamishi Issen no Tomoshibi game was announced. Titled Katana Maidens – Tomoshibi, the OVA is animated by Project No.9 and directed by Tomohiro Kamitani, with Aoi Akashiro handling the series' scripts, and Daisuke Niitsuma designing the characters. Yukari Hashimoto and Kazuki Yanagawa are composing the music. It aired in an "advanced premiere" set in two parts via broadcast and streaming services. The first part premiered on AT-X on October 25, 2020, while the second part premiered on November 29, 2020. Medialink licensed the series in Asia-Pacific.

=== Novel ===
A novel was released on July 19, 2019. The story begins a year before the events in the anime.

No.	Release date	ISBN
1	July 19, 2019	978-4-08-703479-0

=== Stage play ===
A 2.5D stage play starring various SKE48 idols was announced on July 24, 2018. It was performed at The Galaxy Theatre in Tokyo from November 10 to 14 of the same year.

== Reception ==
=== Previews ===
The anime series' first episode garnered mixed reviews from Anime News Network's staff during the Winter 2018 season previews. Chris Farris solely reviewed the English dub version of the episode, criticizing the constant padding through "sparse backgrounds and needlessly overused CGI shortcuts" and poor explanation of the "overwrought terminology" about Toji but commended the performances from the various voice actresses. He concluded that despite the dub, the series might have difficulty to compel viewers over time. James Beckett found the introduction "rote and lacking-identity" throughout to garner viewer interest, noting how the premise and characters are filled with clichés and the production "middling at best" with its generic character designs, hollow backgrounds, and CG fight scenes feeling "stiff and blandly directed to be much fun." Lynzee Loveridge repeated what both Farris and Beckett said about the episode's delivery of its religious terminology and sword fights, saying she found it "pretty boring for what's supposed to be a supernatural action show." Rebecca Silverman said the series has potential when the episode moves away from its "cute young girls fight monsters" premise to focus on introducing its cast of characters and buildup some internal conflict towards the end of its runtime. Nick Creamer gave note of the "internal narrative choices" used throughout for raising the show's arbitrary setup, praising the establishment of the world and Kanami and Mai's characters in a tournament setting, but felt it was hampered by weak attempts at building atmosphere through "abominable background art" and action scenes being undercut by poor CG. He concluded that its "just short of passable - worth a look if this is your genre, otherwise a guiltless skip." Theron Martin wrote that after watching the series opener twice, he said that a more thorough elaboration would've helped ease viewers into its world and terminology much better despite "solid visual merits" and the promise of "immediate internal conflict and intrigue" to help infuse life into a standard concept.

=== Series ===
Martin reviewed the complete anime series and gave it a B− grade. He praised the camaraderie amongst its main cast for carrying dramatic weight and interest between the "solid action scenes" but was critical of the unexplored story elements in a complexly savvy but standard plot, quality control of its animation, and unremarkable soundtrack, concluding that: "Overall, Katana Maidens is a watchable but uninspired series beyond a few featured sword fights. While many parts of its story underachieve, it does at least finish on its strongest note, so those unimpressed by earlier parts but committed to finishing will have something to look forward to."

Gadget Tsūshin listed "Horizon Alliance" in their 2019 anime buzzwords list.

== See also ==
- Super Cub - a light novel series whose spin-off manga was written and illustrated by Sakae Saito.
- Touring After the Apocalypse - a manga series written and illustrated by Sakae Saito.
