= Kozue Amano =

Japanese manga artist

Kozue Amano 天野 こずえ
- Born: 26 May 1974 (age 52) Saitama, Japan
- Areas: Manga artist, writer
- Notable works: Aria, Amanchu!

Kozue Amano (天野 こずえ, Amano Kozue; born 26 May 1974) is a Japanese manga artist. She is widely known as the creator of Aria, which proved to be a best-selling hit, and was adapted into an anime television series consisting of 3 seasons, 2 movies and 2 OVAs.

As of autumn 2010, Amano's work releases have been shifted from a monthly schedule to a seasonal one (every 3 months) owing to pregnancy and subsequent childcare.

== Works ==
- Roman Club (浪(ロ)漫(マン)倶(く)楽(ら)部(ぶ), Roman Kurabu) (1995–1996, serialized in Monthly Shōnen Gangan, Enix); (2005 reprint by Mag Garden)
- Mukūkai (夢空界) – Amano Kozue Tanpenshū 1, a collection of short stories (1996, Enix); (2004 reprint by Mag Garden)
- Crescent Noise (クレセントノイズ, Kuresento Noizu) (1997–2001, serialized in Monthly GFantasy, Enix)
- Sora no Uta (空の謳) – Amano Kozue Tanpenshu 2, a collection of short stories (1999, Enix); (2004 reprint by Mag Garden)
- Ohi-sama Egao (おひさま笑顔), also known as Princess' Smile, (2000, Enix)
- AQUA (アクア) (2001, serialized Monthly Stencil, Enix); (2003 reprint by Mag Garden)
- ARIA (アリア) (2002–2008, serialized in Monthly Comic Blade, Mag Garden)
- Amanchu! (あまんちゅ!) (2008–2021, serialized in Monthly Comic Blade, Mag Garden)
- Colori Colore Creare (コローリ コローレ クレアーレ) (2022–present, serialized in MAGCOMI, Mag Garden)
