= Eri Suzuki =

Japanese voice actress (born 1992)

- 鈴木 絵理
- Born: June 22, 1992 (age 34); Musashi-Kosugi, Kanagawa Prefecture, Japan
- Occupation: Voice actress
- Years active: 2013–present
- Agent: Tokyo Actor's Consumer's Cooperative Society

Eri Suzuki (鈴木 絵理, Suzuki Eri; born June 22, 1992) is a Japanese voice actress.

== Filmography ==
=== Anime ===
List of voice performances in anime
| Year | Title | Role | Notes | Ref. |
|---|---|---|---|---|
| 2013 | Oreshura | Schoolgirl | | |
| 2013 | Kin-iro Mosaic | Female Student C | | |
| 2013 | Nagi-Asu: A Lull in the Sea | Kazuyo Kamoto | | |
| 2014–2015 | Nisekoi | Various characters | | |
| 2014 | Selector Infected WIXOSS | Schoolgirl, Girl | | |
| 2014 | Nanana's Buried Treasure | Yū Ibara | | |
| 2014 | Invaders of the Rokujyōma!? | Sanae Higashihongan | | |
| 2014 | Bladedance of Elementalers | Rakka | | |
| 2014 | The Fruit of Grisaia | Nyanmel | | |
| 2014 | Cardfight!! Vanguard G | Younger brother | | |
| 2015 | Saekano: How to Raise a Boring Girlfriend | Tokino Himekawa | | |
| 2015 | The Idolmaster Cinderella Girls | Yūko Hori | 2 seasons | |
| 2015 | Maria the Virgin Witch | Chantal | | |
| 2015 | World Break: Aria of Curse for a Holy Swordsman | Dekosuke | | |
| 2015 | Comical Psychosomatic Medicine | OL | ONA | |
| 2015 | High School D×D BorN | Pawn | | |
| 2015 | Hello!! Kin-iro Mosaic | Schoolgirl | | |
| 2015 | Aoharu x Machinegun | Female customer | | |
| 2015 | School-Live! | Schoolgirl | | |
| 2015 | Prison School | Girl | | |
| 2015 | Heavy Object | Milinda Brantini | | |
| 2015 | Valkyrie Drive: Mermaid | Kusumi 久住 | | |
| 2016 | Please Tell Me! Galko-chan | Buddha ブド子 | | |
| 2016 | Dimension W | Elizabeth "Ellie" Greenhough-Smith | | |
| 2016 | Re:Zero − Starting Life in Another World | Meili | | |
| 2016 | Hundred | Xue-Mei Liu | | |
| 2016 | Flying Witch | Chinatsu Kuramoto | | |
| 2016 | Food Wars!: Shokugeki no Soma | Audience member | | |
| 2016 | Rewrite | Yasmin, Still-flow sister ヤスミン / 静流の妹 | 2 seasons | |
| 2016 | Amanchu! | Hikari Kohinata | | |
| 2016 | Alderamin on the Sky | Kus, Mita Kenshi クス / ミタ・ケンシー | | |
| 2016 | Ani Tore! EX | Sakura Idemi | | |
| 2016 | Girlish Number | Momoka Sonō | | |
| 2016 | Keijo | Akari Fuyuzora | | |
| 2016 | ClassicaLoid | Child | | |
| 2017 | Fuuka | Mika Mikasa 三笠実琴 | | |
| 2017 | Scum's Wish | Elementary school student | | |
| 2017 | Kirakira PreCure a la Mode | Emiru Kodama | | |
| 2018 | Katana Maidens ~ Toji No Miko | Ellen Kohagura | | |
| 2018 | Yo-kai Watch Shadowside | Manami Yashima | | |
| 2018 | Yuuna and the Haunted Hot Springs | Chisaki Miyazaki | | |
| 2018 | Hinamatsuri | Mami | | |
| 2018 | Fairy Tail | Mary | | |
| 2020 | Magia Record | Kako Natsume (Ep.6) | | |
| 2021 | The Faraway Paladin | Robina Goodfellow (Bee) | | |
| 2022 | Black Rock Shooter | Momiji | | |
| 2023 | The Faraway Paladin | Robina Goodfellow (Bee) | | |

=== Film ===
List of voice performances in film
| Year | Title | Role | Notes | Ref. |
|---|---|---|---|---|
| 2014 | Ōkī Ichinensei to Chīsana Ninensei ja:大きい1年生と小さな2年生 | Neighbor Girl | short film | |

=== Video games ===
List of voice performances in video games
| Year | Title | Role | Notes | Ref. |
|---|---|---|---|---|
| 2015 | Monster Strike | Napoleon ナポレオン | | |
| 2015 | Dengeki Bunko: Fighting Climax Ignition | Milinda Brantini | | |
| 2016 | Akiba's Beat | Onikari Akari 鬼灯アカリ | | |
| 2017 | Fire Emblem Echoes: Shadows of Valentia | Delthea, Emma | | |
| 2017 | Azur Lane | USS Bailey ベイリー | | |
| 2017 | Magia Record: Puella Magi Madoka Magica Side Story | Kako Natsume | | |
| 2018 | Onsen Musume: Yunohana Collection | Tsubaki Ito | | |
| 2021 | Umamusume: Pretty Derby | Tosen Jordan | | |
| 2026 | BUNNY GARDEN 2 | Rin | | |

=== Dubbing ===
==== Live-action ====
| Year | Title | Role | Dub for | Notes | Ref. |
|---|---|---|---|---|---|
| 2020 | The Big Show Show | Olivia | Emma Loewen | | |

==== Animation ====
| Year | Title | Role | Notes | Ref. |
|---|---|---|---|---|
| 2023 | Firebuds | Axl Ambrose | | |
