= Aya Ishizu =

Japanese voice actress

Aya Ishizu (石津 彩, Ishizu Aya; born February 22, 1972 in Tokyo) is a Japanese voice actress who works for Theater Echo.

== Notable filmography ==
- Tomomi Mizuno in Dokyusei 2
- Barry the Chopper (female disguise) in Fullmetal Alchemist
- Miyuki/Mrs. One in Magical Girl Pretty Sammy TV
- Nikita in Romeo no Aoi Sora
- Mami Honda in Super GALS! Kotobuki Ran
- Yuka Sugimoto in Twelve Kingdoms
- Lunge's Daughter in Monster (manga)

=== Dubbing ===
==== Live-action ====
- Gulliver's Travels, Lilliputian Rose (Gemma Whelan)
- I Love You Phillip Morris, Debbie (Leslie Mann)
- Public Enemies, Billie Frechette (Marion Cotillard)

==== Animation ====
- Rio, Linda
