= Shin Kono =

- 河野 伸
- Born: 河野 伸 (Kōno Shin); November 11, 1964 (age 62); Tokyo, Japan
- Occupations: Musician; composer; arranger
- Years active: 1987–present
- Musical career
- Instruments: Piano; keyboards
- Formerly of: Spank Happy
- Website: konoshin.jp

Shin Kono (河野 伸, Kōno Shin; born November 11, 1964) is a Japanese composer, arranger, and keyboardist from Tokyo.

== Biography ==
Born in Tokyo in 1964, Shin Kono began studying piano at the age of five, attending Yamaha Music School alongside a friend and his older sister. Despite friends dropping out, Kono continued lessons, partly due to his sister’s persistence, until his third year of junior high. During this time, he studied classical pieces by composers like Friedrich Burgmüller and Carl Czerny but grew increasingly drawn to pop music. As a child, he enjoyed kayōkyoku artists like Kenji Sawada and Candies, later discovering Western artists like The Carpenters through an LP gifted by an uncle. His passion for music deepened in junior high when his sister introduced him to a Beatles live album, which profoundly influenced him. Though he wanted to quit classical piano to focus on pop, he found it difficult to voice this desire and continued lessons, often erasing his teacher’s red pencil marks to avoid assigned pieces. Kono’s love for pop music led him to transcribe songs by ear from the radio, a practice that honed his musical intuition.

During his high school years, Kono pursued music actively through band activities. While attending university, he performed as a keyboardist for productions by the Shiki Theatre Company. After graduating, Kono embarked on a professional music career, initially gaining prominence as a session musician and arranger.

In the 1990s, Kono became a long-time collaborator with singer-songwriter Chisato Moritaka, composing several songs for her and serving as a support band member for her concerts. During this decade, Kono also worked with diverse acts, including Hello Project’s Morning Musume, Pizzicato Five, and Cosa Nostra. A significant project was his involvement with the pop band Spank Happy from 1992 to 1997 alongside Naruyoshi Kikuchi and Midori Hara, where he contributed to songwriting, arranging, producing, keyboard performance, and backing vocals.

Kono’s career in TV soundtracks began in 2000 with the drama Food Fight, broadcast by NTV. Collaborating with Tetsutaro Sakurai, Kono crafted character-driven music that showcased his ability to adapt to various contexts, a skill honed during his 1990s session work. This marked the start of a prolific period in the 2000s, during which Kono composed for numerous dramas, films, and stage productions. His versatile and emotionally resonant compositions, contributing to numerous hit dramas such as Ossan's Love, An Incurable Case of Love, and Dairenai: Boku o Wasureru Kimi to, earned him a name as a prolific composer of background music, known in Japanese as gekiban. In 2006, Kono received the Music Award at the 49th edition of Japanese Television Drama Academy Awards for his work on Iryū: Team Medical Dragon, alongside fellow composer Hiroyuki Sawano.

In addition to his work for TV dramas, Kono composed and arranged all music for the Shiki Theatre Company’s production Robot in the Garden, which premiered in 2020.

His arranging, producing, composing, and works as supporting band member have also extended to prominent artists including Crystal Kay, Mika Nakashima, Rip Slyme, Maaya Sakamoto, Nao Matsushita, and Mone Kamishiraishi, among others.

== Works ==
=== 1990s ===
Year	Artist	Title	Album	Work	Ref
1991	Chisato Moritaka	"Get Smile" (concert arrange version)	The Moritaka	Keyboards, Chorus	
1991	Chisato Moritaka	"Seishun" (The Moritaka take)	The Moritaka	Keyboards, Chorus	
1991	Chisato Moritaka	"Kusai Mono ni wa Futa wo Shiro!!" (old man version)	The Moritaka	Keyboards	
1992	Chisato Moritaka	"The Blue Blues"	Rock Alive	Composer, Arranger	
1992	Chisato Moritaka	"Yowasete yo Kon'ya Dake"	Rock Alive	Arranger	
1992	Chisato Moritaka	"Pepperland"	Pepperland	Composer, Arranger, Guitar	
1992	Chisato Moritaka	"Tokonatsu no Paradise"	Pepperland	Keyboards	
1993	Midori Hara from Spank Happy	"Ohayō"	Young, Gifted and Five	Co-Composer, Arranger	
1993	Midori Hara from Spank Happy	"Out with Her ~Lovers' Universe~" (Without Her)	Young, Gifted and Five	Arranger	
1993	Satoshi Ikeda	"Traffic Jam"	The Album	Arranger	
1993	Satoshi Ikeda	"Jealous Guy"	The Album	Arranger	
1993	Satoshi Ikeda	"Accidental Happiness"	The Album	Arranger	
1994	Chisato Moritaka	"Rock'n Omelette"	Rock'n Omelette	Keyboards	
1994	Ice Box	"Want Experience Age" (baking powder mix)	The Very Best of Ice Box	Keyboards	
1994	Ice Box	"Setting Sun"	The Very Best of Ice Box	Keyboards	
1994	Chisato Moritaka	"Taifū"	Step by Step	Keyboards	
1995	Cosa Nostra	"Jolie"	Jolie	Strings	
1995	Cosa Nostra	"Share Your Love"	Share Your Love	Strings, Brass, Keyboards	
1995	Cosa Nostra	"Be Yourself"	Love the Music	Strings, Brass, Keyboards	
1995	Cosa Nostra	"Share Your Love" (Album Version)	Love the Music	Strings, Brass, Keyboards	
1995	Hanayo	"Dang Dong"	Dang Dong	Keyboards, Co-Programming	
1995	Cosa Nostra	"Sweet Child"	Sweet Child	Brass, Keyboards	
1995	Yuko Tsuburaya	"One Hundred Million Kisses One Hundred Million Sighs"	One Hundred Million Kisses One Hundred Million Sighs	Brass, Keyboards	
1995	Pizzicato Five	"Sekai de Ichiban Funky na Band"	Romantique 96	Keyboards	
1995	Cosa Nostra	"The Door's Open!"	World Peace	Brass	
1995	Cosa Nostra	"Peace & Happiness"	World Peace	Chorus	
1995	Cosa Nostra	"Bonjour Fujiyama"	World Peace	Strings	
1995	Cosa Nostra	"Say Goodnight"	World Peace	Strings	
1995	Cosa Nostra	"Why"	World Peace	Strings	
1995	Cosa Nostra	"Sweet Child" (English Version)	World Peace	Brass, Keyboards	
1995	Cosa Nostra	"World Peace Part 1"	World Peace	Co-Arranger, Strings, Brass, Keyboards	
1995	Cosa Nostra	"World Peace"	World Peace	Strings	
1995	Satomi Kihara	"Carnival"	Carnival	Arranger, Keyboards	
1995	Katsuyuki Watai	"Path to Tomorrow"	Tears	Strings	
1995	Katsuyuki Watai	"Town of Dream Fragrance"	Tears	Strings	
1995	Katsuyuki Watai	"I Want You"	Tears	Strings	
1995	Katsuyuki Watai	"Someday Everything"	Tears	Strings	
1995	Yoichiro Yanagihara	"Christmas Bell"	Christmas Bell	Keyboards	
1995	Yoichiro Yanagihara	"I Am a Musician"	Christmas Bell	Keyboards	
1995	Osada Sadao featuring Sunshine/Moonlight	"May Christmas Bring You Happiness"	Girls Christmas ~Wish You Were Here~	Keyboards, Programming	
1995	F.L.A.G.S.	"F.l.a.g.s." (album)	F.l.a.g.s.	Keyboards	
1995	Born Free Red featuring Midori Hara	"Red Bird Escaped?"	Go! Cinemania Reel 4 ~Cover Rocks~	Keyboards	
1995	Spank Happy	"Chocolate Fork Song"	Chocolate Fork Song	Composer, Keyboards, Guitar, Chorus	
1996	Aya Hisakawa	"Okonomiyaki Go Go"	For You For Me	Composer, Arranger, Keyboards	
1996	Pizzicato Five	"Baby Portable Rock"	Baby Portable Rock	Keyboards	
1996	Soon	"Picture Show"	The Perfect Unbalance	Keyboards	
1996	Naho Hoshina	"Girl Meets Boy"	Anata to Sugoshitai	Arranger	
1996	Youssou N'Dour	"Ob-La-Di, Ob-La-Da"	Ob-La-Di, Ob-La-Da	Co-Arranger	
1996	Midori Hara	"Bye Bye Black Baby" (Dedicated to Black Cat Nakaya)	Worst 12 in Heaven	Co-Arranger, Keyboards	
1996	Mari Natsuki	"Gorilla"	Gorilla	Arranger	
1996	Mari Natsuki	"November"	Gorilla	Arranger	
1996	Mari Natsuki	"My Blue Sky"	Gorilla	Arranger	
1996	Kangaroo Pockets	"Movin' in the Right Direction"	Kangaroo Pockets	Arranger, Keyboards	
1996	Kangaroo Pockets	"Night of Sand"	Kangaroo Pockets	Arranger, Keyboards	
1996	Kangaroo Pockets	"Time After Time"	Kangaroo Pockets	Arranger, Keyboards	
1996	F.L.A.G.S.	"M.o.r" (album)	M.O.R	Keyboards	
1996	F.L.A.G.S.	"Breathless" (mini album)	Breathless	Keyboards	
1996	Pizzicato Five	"Theme of Kids Challenge"	Great White Wonder Rare Masters 1990-1996	Keyboards	
1996	Senri Yamazaki	"Wide Show"	Envy	Arranger	
1996	Senri Yamazaki	"Cyberpunk"	Envy	Arranger	
1996	Senri Yamazaki	"W-Face"	Envy	Arranger	
1996	Tetsutaro Sakurai	"And Now"	Haikei, Koshiro Fubuki-sama	Keyboards	
1996	Tetsutaro Sakurai	"T.v.jesus"	Sa Se Pari ~C'est Si Bon~	Keyboards	
1996	Kangaroo Pockets	"Wish Upon a Star ~Hoshi ga Kirakira to Kagayaku Hitomi ni~"	Hoshi ni Negai o ~Star Floating in My Eyes~	Arranger	
1996	Kangaroo Pockets	"Pillow"	Hoshi ni Negai o ~Star Floating in My Eyes~	Arranger	
1996	The Name of Love	"Party Party ~Kajoo ni Jishin ga Arisugite Igai to Yowaki~"	Party Party	Brass, Keyboards	
1996	F.L.A.G.S.	"Holy Planet" (mini album)	Holy Planet	Keyboards	
1996	Tetsutaro Sakurai	"Ready to Fly" (Alphaville Mix)	Takanaka Remix The Best	Keyboards	
1996	Yumi Adachi	"Better Place ~Koi no Marathon Boy~"	Viva! America	Arranger	
1996	Pizzicato Five	"Message Song"	Message Song	Keyboards	
1997	Cosa Nostra	"People" (High Relax Version)	Let's Sing and Dance	Keyboards	
1997	Cosa Nostra	"Let's Sing and Dance" (Reprise)	Let's Sing and Dance	Keyboards	
1997	F.L.A.G.S.	"Cream" (mini album)	Cream	Keyboards	
1997	Cosa Nostra	"Round Trip"	Trip Magic	Keyboards	
1997	Cosa Nostra	"Love Kitten"	Trip Magic	Keyboards	
1997	Cosa Nostra	"Sunny Day"	Trip Magic	Keyboards	
1997	Cosa Nostra	"Time Machine"	Trip Magic	Keyboards	
1997	Cosa Nostra	"Raise Your Hand"	Trip Magic	Keyboards	
1997	Yuko Suzuki	"I Can Tell You Why"	Moving	Arranger	
1997	Yuko Suzuki	"Zutto Shinjite..."	Moving	Arranger	
1997	Aco	"Yoru no Sketch"	Nude	Keyboards	
1997	Yumi Tanimura	"I Love You at Least"	Semetemo no I Love You	Brass, Keyboards	
1997	Pizzicato Five	"Mon Amour Tokyo"	Mon Amour Tokyo	Keyboards	
1997	Chisato Moritaka	"Ninki Mono de"	Peachberry	Composer, Arranger	
1997	Chisato Moritaka	"Kataomoi"	Peachberry	Composer, Arranger	
1997	Yumi Yoshimura	"Tennen no Beauty"	Solosolo	Keyboards	
1997	Yumi Yoshimura	"Hanabi"	Solosolo	Keyboards	
1997	Yumi Yoshimura	"Sore Nari ni"	Solosolo	Keyboards	
1997	Yumi Yoshimura	"Ai no Aura"	Solosolo	Keyboards	
1997	Yumi Yoshimura	"Watashi no Nozomi"	Solosolo	Keyboards	
1997	Morning Musume	"Ai no Tane"	Ai no Tane	Keyboards	
1997	Michiyo Heike	"Get"	Get	Keyboards	
1997	Michiyo Heike	"Prepare"	Get		
1997	Yuko Suzuki	"(They Long to Be) Close to You"	Close to You	Arranger	
1998	Morning Musume	"Morning Coffee"	Morning Coffee	Keyboards	
1998	Yuko Suzuki	"Life"	Life	Arranger	
1998	Yuko Suzuki	"A Hundred Ways"	Life	Arranger	
1998	Yuko Suzuki	"Yotei Chōwa no Mainichi"	Life	Arranger	
1998	Yuko Suzuki	"Kokoro no Iro"	Life	Arranger	
1998	Yuko Suzuki	"Bossa Nova"	Life	Arranger	
1998	Yuko Suzuki	"Tōi Hi no Melody"	Life	Arranger	
1998	Yuko Suzuki	"~Miyabi~"	Life	Arranger	
1998	Michiyo Heike	"Akai Tsuki"	Teenage Dream	Keyboards	
1998	Cosa Nostra	"Sweet Music"	Our Thing	Keyboards	
1998	Cosa Nostra	"Hachimitsu"	Our Thing	Keyboards	
1998	Cosa Nostra	"I Know You Know"	Our Thing	Keyboards	
1998	Cosa Nostra	"Communication"	Our Thing	Brass, Keyboards	
1998	Cosa Nostra	"Yes"	Our Thing	Keyboards	
1998	Cosa Nostra	"Obscure Corner"	Our Thing	Brass	
1998	Cosa Nostra	"World Go Round"	Our Thing	Keyboards	
1998	Cosa Nostra	"Dreaming"	Our Thing	Keyboards	
1998	Shizuka Kudo	"Kama Sutra no Densetsu"	I'm Not	Keyboards	
1998	Kaoruko	"Bye-bye Arigato"	Bye-bye Arigato	Keyboards	
1998	Kaoruko	"Aishiteru no"	Bye-bye Arigato	Keyboards	
1998	Heath	"Daydream #006" (Lp Version)	Gang Age Cubist	Keyboards	
1998	Heath	"Believe"	Gang Age Cubist	Keyboards	
1998	Heath	"Rock and Roll"	Gang Age Cubist	Keyboards	
1998	Heath	"Mind"	Gang Age Cubist	Keyboards	
1998	Isis	"Angel"	Submarine Tunnel	Keyboards	
1998	Isis	"Kono Hoshi no Uragawa de"	Submarine Tunnel		
1998	mcSisters	"Doko ka"	Doko ka?	Keyboards	
1998	Miho Yonemitsu	"Orange"	Orange E.P.	Arranger	
1998	Miho Yonemitsu	"Colorful"	Orange E.P.	Arranger	
1998	Miho Yonemitsu	"Hoshi"	Orange E.P.	Arranger	
1998	Yuko Suzuki	"Ame"	Mikazuki	Arranger	
1998	Nin Yoshizuka	"I'm a Boy"	Boy EP	Keyboards	
1998	Chisato Moritaka	"Utopia"	Sava Sava	Composer, Arranger	
1998	Chisato Moritaka	"Umi Made Gofun" (Album Version)	Sava Sava	Keyboards	
1998	Aco	"Lady Soul" (Day-lite Version)	Lady Soul	Arranger	
1998	Pizzicato Five	"Weekend"	Weekend	Keyboards	
1998	Akiko Wada	"Kanashii Uta"	Dynamite-A-Go-Go!!!	Keyboards	
1998	Yipes	"Another Song Cycle" (instrumental)	Beat Per Minutes	Keyboards	
1998	Clémentine	"Week-end"	Heure D'ete	Keyboards	
1999	7house	"Stop ~Nakanai de~"	Stop ~Nakanai de~	Arranger	
1999	Aco	"Aishuu to Ballad"	Aishuu to Ballad	Co-Arranger, Keyboards	
1999	Amika	"Asagata"	Yureru Hikari nai Umi no Soko	Keyboards	
1999	Amika	"Jutaku"	Yureru Hikari nai Umi no Soko	Keyboards	
1999	Tanpopo	"Motto"	Motto	Arranger	
1999	Precoci	"I~jan!!"	I~jan!!	Keyboards	
1999	Chisato Moritaka	"Watashi no Yō ni"	Watashi no Yō ni	Composer, Arranger, Keyboards	
1999	Junichi Inagaki	"A Dozen no Iiwake"	FM AOR	Keyboards	
1999	Tanpopo	"Sentimental Minamimuki"	Tanpopo 1	Arranger	
1999	Tanpopo	"Motto" (album mix)	Tanpopo 1	Arranger	
1999	Aaron G.	"The Heat Is On"	Bust a Move 2/Dance Tengoku Mix	Composer, Arranger, Keyboards, Producer	
1999	Anji	"Hello! Kitty-n"	Bust a Move 2/Dance Tengoku Mix	Composer, Arranger, Keyboards, Producer	
1999	Pizzicato Five	"Darlin' of Discotheque"	Darlin' of Discotheque E.P.	Keyboards	
1999	Hinano Yoshikawa	"Mellow Pretty"	Mellow Pretty	Brass	
1999	Morning Musume	"Manatsu no Kōsen"	Manatsu no Kōsen	Keyboards	
1999	Epo	"Dareka o Honki de Aishitemitai"	Peach	Keyboards	
1999	Epo	"Kimi no Sagashimono"	Peach	Keyboards	
1999	Epo	"Baby's Magic"	Peach	Keyboards	
1999	Tomomi Kageyuto	"Anata ni Tsuite"	Lemon & Milk	Arranger	
1999	Tomomi Kageyuto	"Parasol Chocolate"	Lemon & Milk	Arranger	
1999	Cosa Nostra	"Don't Stop the Music"	Don't Stop the Music	Strings	
1999	Aco	"Nothing Compares 2u"	Aishita Anata wa Tsuyoi Hito	Arranger	
1999	SMAP	"Idea"	Birdman ~SMAP 013~	Keyboards	
1999	Taiyo to Ciscomoon	"In Space La Ta Ta"	Uchu de La Ta Ta	Keyboards	
1999	Morning Musume	"Manatsu no Kōsen" (Vacation Mix)	Second Morning	Keyboards	
1999	Morning Musume	"Otome no Shinrigaku"	Second Morning	Keyboards	
1999	Arb	"Respect the Night"	El Dorado	Keyboards	
1999	Arb	"Nightmare Slayer"	El Dorado	Keyboards	
1999	Arb	"Midnight Stranger"	El Dorado	Keyboards	
1999	Arb	"Hito Toshite"	El Dorado	Keyboards	
1999	Coconuts Musume	"Dance & Chance"	Dance & Chance	Arranger	
1999	Mio	"Akai Kutsu"	Akai Kutsu	Composer, Arranger	
1999	Tsunku	"Touch Me #4"	Touch Me	Arranger	
1999	Chisato Moritaka	"Feeling Good" (Out Take)	Mix Age*	Keyboards	
1999	Aco	"Flower Blooming in Joy"	Yorokobi ni Saku Hana	Strings, Keyboards	
1999	Aco	"Prologue"	Absolute Ego	Strings	
1999	Aco	"Spleen"	Absolute Ego	Co-Arranger, Keyboards	
1999	Keizo Nakanishi	"Hoshi no Oasis"	Sunshine Groove	Strings, Keyboards	

=== 2000s ===
Year	Artist	Title	Album	Work
2000	Tomomi Kandebyu	"Otona ni Naru Koto"	Konna ni Utsukushii Atashi no Kao o Mitsumenaide	Arranger
2000	Miwako Okuda	"Sayonara Egoist"	Shizuku	Arranger
2000	Kiiro 5	"The Yellow Sky Boom Boom Boom"	The Yellow Sky Boom Boom Boom	Arranger
2000	Sakura Kinomoto (Sakura Tange)	"Hitotsu Dake"	Cardcaptor Sakura Original Soundtrack Vol.4	Arranger
2000	T&C Bomber	"Don't Stop Ren'aichuu"	Don't Stop Ren'aichuu	Arranger
2000	Coconuts Musume	"Tokonatsu Musume"	Tokonatsu Musume	Arranger
2000	Miku	"Rojou no Hana"	Rojou no Hana	Arranger
2000	Miku	"Pink no Uso"	Rojou no Hana	Arranger
2000	Miku	"Miku no Hoshi"	Rojou no Hana	Arranger
2000	Miwako Okuda	"Tsu-ki"	Tsu-ki	Arranger
2000	Miwako Okuda	"Zero"	Tsu-ki	Arranger
2000	Melon Kinenbi	"Kokuhaku Kinenbi"	Kokuhaku Kinenbi	Arranger
2000	Yukihiro Fukutomi	"Brazilia"	On a Trip	Arranger
2000	Yukihiro Fukutomi	"Drifting"	On a Trip	Arranger
2000	Mio	"The Pomegranate"	The Pomegranate	Composer, Arranger
2000	Mio	"Spread"	The Pomegranate	Composer
2000	Kyoko Fukada	"Hidarite"	How?	Arranger, Keyboard
2000	Hiro:n	"Blood Type AB-Lover"	Blood Type AB-Lover	Strings, Brass
2000	Hiro:n	"Summers"	Blood Type AB-Lover	Strings, Keyboard
2000	Coconuts Musume	"Watashi mo 'I Love You'"	Watashi mo 'I Love You'	Arranger, Keyboard
2000	Morning Musume	"I Wish"	I Wish	Arranger, Keyboard
2000	Tomomi Kandebyu	"80-kai Date Elevator no Naka"	Me ni Te ni Ai ni Chikau Mono	Arranger
2000	Tomomi Kandebyu	"Parachute no Kami-sama"	Me ni Te ni Ai ni Chikau Mono	Arranger
2000	Miki Takaesu	"Akai Hoshi"	Akai Hoshi	Composer, Arranger, Keyboard
2000	T&C Bomber	"Be My Love"	2nd Stage	Arranger, Keyboard
2000	Various Artists		Diva 2000 Vol.1	Arranger
2000	SMAP	"Last Scene"	S Map: SMAP 014	Arranger
2000	SMAP	"Shiosai"	S Map: SMAP 014	Composer, Arranger
2000	EE Jump	"Love Is Energy!"	Love Is Energy!	Arranger, Keyboard
2000	Ken Hirai	"Taboo" (a tip of M-Flo remix)	Love or Lust	Strings
2001	Aco	"Heart o Moyashite"	Heart o Moyashite	Arranger, Keyboard
2001	Aco	"Creep"	Heart o Moyashite	Arranger, Keyboard
2001	Kaori	"Deai o Arigatou…"	Brigadoon Marinto to Melan OST 2	Composer, Arranger, Keyboard
2001	Shinnosuke Furumoto	"Tokyo Dance"	Tokyo Dance	Arranger, Keyboard
2001	Michiyo Heike	"Kekkyoku Bye Bye Bye"	Kekkyoku Bye Bye Bye	Arranger, Keyboard
2001	Sakura	"Koe o Kikashite"	Koe o Kikashite	Arranger, Keyboard
2001	Kyoko Koizumi	"Itsu datte Doko datte"	KYO→2 〜Anniversary Song〜	Arranger, Keyboard
2001	Yukihiro Fukutomi (Lovements Unlimited Orchestra)	"Love's Theme of Beatmania"	Beatmania Core Remix Original Soundtrack	Arranger, Keyboard
2001	Moomin	"Kanashimi ga Kieru Made"	Kanashimi ga Kieru Made	Strings
2001	Mio	"Rebirthday"	Rebirthday	Composer, Arranger, Keyboard
2001	Mio	"Shounen"	Rebirthday	Composer, Arranger, Keyboard
2001	Rip Slyme	"Stepper's Delight"	Stepper's Delight	Strings
2001	M-Flo	"Prism"	Expo Expo	Strings
2001	M-Flo	"Obit-3"	Expo Expo	Strings
2001	Sakura	"Koe o Kikashite" (Album Version)	Suzuka	Arranger, Keyboard
2001	Sakura	"Aisuru Hito yo"	Suzuka	Arranger, Keyboard
2001	Asumi Nakada	"Angel Snow"	Kirai ja★Boogie	Keyboard
2001	Aco	"Hoshi no Kuzu"	Hoshi no Kuzu	Co-Arranger, Keyboard, Co-Producer
2001	Aco	"Canaria wa Naku"	Material	Composer (Co), Arranger, Keyboard
2001	Aco	"Time"	Material	Arranger, Keyboard
2001	Aco	"Heart o Moyashite" (Special Branch Mix)	Material	Arranger, Keyboard, Producer
2001	Kyoko Fukada	"Universe"	Swimming	Keyboard
2001	Kyoko Fukada	"Figure"	Swimming	Keyboard
2001	Coatz	"Away"	From Here From Now	Strings, Keyboard
2001	Coatz	"Milk Caramel"	From Here From Now	Keyboard
2001	Hiroko Watanabe	"Sono Hi Made Sora o Mite"	Sono Hi Made Sora o Mite	Arranger, Keyboard
2001	Hiroko Watanabe	"Yume o Tsukande"	Sono Hi Made Sora o Mite	Arranger, Keyboard
2001	Hikaru Utada	"Distance" (M-Flo remix)	Final Distance	Strings
2001	SMAP	"Best Friend" (2001 version)	Pams	Arranger, Keyboard
2001	Sora-iro no Kirin	"Tatta Ichido no Tanjōbi"	Tatta Ichido no Tanjoubi	Arranger, Keyboard
2001	Sora-iro no Kirin	"Sora Iro no Kirin"	Tatta Ichido no Tanjoubi	Arranger, Keyboard
2001	Ends	"Sunshine High"	Magic Days	Strings
2001	Sakura	"Joy and Pain"	Hikari no Umi	Composer, Arranger, Keyboard
2001	Morning Musume	"Popcorn Love!"	Mr. Moonlight (Ai no Big Band)	Arranger, Keyboard
2001	Color	"Overture" (glave strings)	Love Execute	Composer, Arranger
2001	Color	"Chisaki Monotachi"	Love Execute	Arranger, Keyboard
2001	Kyoko Fukada	"Shitsumon ga Aru no"	Universe	Arranger, Keyboard
2001	Kyoko Fukada	"Universe" (Strings Version)	Universe	Arranger, Keyboard
2001	Kyoko Fukada	"People"	Universe	Strings, Keyboard
2001	Time Fellowship	"Take Your Mark"	Humanized	Strings
2001	Time Fellowship	"Sweet Days"	Humanized	Co-Arranger, Keyboard
2001	Time Fellowship	"Dearest 〜Itsumademo Wasurenai"	Humanized	Strings
2002	Aya Matsuura	"Egao ni Namida 〜Thank You! Dear My Friends〜"	First Kiss	Arranger, Keyboard
2002	Qoonie	"Yoake Mae"	Yoake Mae	Arranger, Keyboard
2002	Qoonie	"Spiral"	Yoake Mae	Arranger, Keyboard
2002	Miho Karasawa	"Rakuen"	Sparkle	Strings
2002	Shiro Kamui (Kenichi Suzumura)	"Kesshou"	X Original Soundtrack II	Keyboard
2002	Heartsdales	"That's Why"	That's Why	Strings
2002	Xash	"Don't Cry, My Heart"	Unforgettable	Co-Producer
2002	Rip Slyme	"Funkastic"	Funkastic	Brass
2002	Spank Happy	"Haikei Miss International"	Angelic	Keyboard
2002	Mika Nakashima	"Helpless Rain"	Helpless Rain	Strings
2002	Melon Kinenbi	"Natsu no Yoru wa Danger!"	Natsu no Yoru wa Danger!	Brass
2002	Rip Slyme	"Rakuen Baby"	Rakuen Baby	Strings
2002	Rip Slyme	"Laugh Maniac" (Senor Coconut remix)	Rakuen Baby	Strings, Brass
2002	James Onoda to Nanja Monja	"Makeruna! Monja"	Makeruna! Monja	Arranger, Keyboard
2002	Hatsukoi no Arashi	"Manatsu no Yoru no Koto"	Manatsu no Yoru no Koto	Strings
2002	Eiko Matsumoto	"Bad Paradise"	Catharsis	Composer, Arranger, Keyboard
2002	Eiko Matsumoto	"Kimi ni Aitai"	Catharsis	Arranger, Keyboard
2002	Eiko Matsumoto	"Catharsis"	Catharsis	Arranger, Keyboard
2002	Rip Slyme	"Rakuen Baby" (Album version)	Tokyo Classic	Strings
2002	Yukihiro Fukutomi	"Love Each Other" (Main Mix)	Love Each Other	Keyboard
2002	Maki Goto	"Kimagure"	Yaruki! It's Easy	Arranger, Keyboard
2002	Sonim	"Ai wa Motto Sou Janakute"	Curry Rice no Onna	Arranger, Keyboard
2002	Hitomi	"Busy Now" (Self Portrait version)	Self Portrait	Brass
2002	Aya Matsuura	"I Know"	The Bigaku	Arranger, Keyboard
2002	Suneohair	"Jimon Jitou"	Sunestyle	Strings
2002	Daisy	"Hajimari"	Hajimari	Strings
2002	Daisy	"Speed"	Hajimari	Strings
2002	Senri Oue	"This Christmas" (Album Version)	Untitled Love Songs	Strings
2002	Senri Oue	"Let It Be, Sweet" (Album Version)	Untitled Love Songs	Strings
2002	Rip Slyme	"Blue Be-Bop"	Blue Be-Bop	Strings, Brass
2002	Tsukiko Amano	"Ningyo" (MegMix)	Meg & Lion	Strings
2002	Tsukiko Amano	"Nichiyoubi"	Meg & Lion	Strings
2002	Tsukiko Amano	"Tokeidai no Kane"	Meg & Lion	Strings
2002	Tsukiko Amano	"Clematis"	Meg & Lion	Strings
2003	Rie Tanaka	"Overture"	24 Wishes	Composer, Arranger, Keyboard
2003	Rie Tanaka	"Ice Tea"	24 Wishes	Arranger, Keyboard
2003	Rie Tanaka	"Giniro no Ame"	24 Wishes	Arranger, Keyboard
2003	Rie Tanaka	"Hitomi no Tunnel"	24 Wishes	Arranger, Keyboard
2003	Rie Tanaka	"Midori no Mori"	24 Wishes	Arranger, Keyboard
2003	Rie Tanaka	"Shiranai Sora"	24 Wishes	Arranger, Keyboard
2003	Rie Tanaka	"24 wishes"	24 Wishes	Composer, Arranger, Keyboard
2003	Yuki Tsujimoto	"season"	Rashiku…	Arranger, Keyboard
2003	Yuki Tsujimoto	"‘Ashita’ e Tsuzuku Hodou"	Rashiku…	Arranger, Keyboard
2003	Crystal Kay	"Boyfriend -part II-"	Boyfriend -part II-	Strings
2003	Daisuke Kawaguchi	"Let's Get Together Now"	Before the Dawn	Strings, Harp
2003	Daisuke Kawaguchi	"Will (ensemble in the Dawn)"	Before the Dawn	Strings
2003	Keyco	"Sanpomichi"	Sanpomichi	Composer, Arranger, Keyboard
2003	Keyco	"I'll Love You Forever …"	Sanpomichi	Co-Arranger, Keyboard
2003	Aya Matsuura	"Motokare"	T.W.O	Arranger, Keyboard
2003	Retro G-Style	"Your Body's Callin'"	Lifelights	Strings
2003	Retro G-Style	"All Eyes on Me"	Lifelights	Strings
2003	Keyco	"Ao"	Water Notes	Co-Arranger, Keyboard
2003	Keyco	"Motto"	Water Notes	Co-Arranger, Keyboard
2003	Rip Slyme	"Mata Au Hi Made"	Orchestra + Plus	Producer
2003	Rip Slyme	"Home"	Orchestra + Plus	Producer
2003	Rip Slyme	"Rakuen Baby"	Orchestra + Plus	Producer
2003	Rip Slyme	"Funkastic"	Orchestra + Plus	Arranger, Producer
2003	Rip Slyme	"Unmei Kyoudoutai"	Orchestra + Plus	Producer
2003	Rip Slyme	"Laugh Maniac"	Orchestra + Plus	Producer
2003	Rip Slyme	"Zatsunen Entertainment"	Orchestra + Plus	Arranger, Producer
2003	Rip Slyme	"Hakujitsu"	Orchestra + Plus	Arranger, Producer
2003	Rip Slyme	"Blue Be-Bop"	Orchestra + Plus	Arranger, Producer
2003	Rip Slyme	"One"	Orchestra + Plus	Arranger, Producer
2003	Morning Musume	"Sotsugyō Ryokō 〜Morning Musume. Tabidatsu Hito ni Okuru Uta〜"	No. 5	Arranger, Keyboard
2003	Lisa	"Natural Color"	Juicy Music	Strings
2003	Sonim	"Heibonteki Joshi na Jouken"	Hana	Arranger, Keyboard
2003	Akiko Wada	"Tomorrow 〜Georgia de Ikimashou Hen II〜"	Tomorrow	Arranger, Keyboard
2003	Akiko Wada	"Tomorrow" (Original version)	Tomorrow	Arranger, Keyboard
2003	Coatz	"tale of hairy"	Himawari	Strings
2003	Aco	"Akai Shishu"	Irony	Strings, Koto
2003	Aco	"Uraniva"	Irony	Strings, Koto
2003	Aco	"Subako"	Irony	Strings, Koto
2003	M-Flo loves Crystal Kay	"Reeewind!"	Reeewind!	Strings
2003	SMAP	"Touch Me Kiss Me"	SMAP 016/MIJ	Arranger, Keyboard
2003	Suneohair	"Aoi Sora"	a watercolor	Strings
2003	Suneohair	"Speed"	a watercolor	Strings
2003	Morning Musume	"Shabondama"	Shabondama	Strings, Brass
2003	Chemistry	"Ashita e Kaeru"	Ashita e Kaeru/Us	Arranger, Keyboard
2003	Chemistry	"Us"	Ashita e Kaeru/Us	Arranger, Keyboard
2003	ZYX	"Iku ZYX! Fly High"	Iku ZYX! Fly High	Arranger, Keyboard
2003	Kyoko	"I'm Losing You"	Singapura	Keyboard
2003	Soul'd Out	"Soul'd Out is Comin'"	Soul'd Out	Strings
2003	Soul'd Out	"Game"	Soul'd Out	Strings
2003	Soul'd Out	"Senshitachi Tenshitachi 〜Livin' for Today〜"	Soul'd Out	Strings, Woodwinds
2003	Mika Nakashima	"A Miracle for You"	True	Arranger
2003	Rie Tanaka	"Judy"	Chara de Rie	Arranger, Keyboard
2003	M-Flo loves Melody. & Ryohei	"Miss You"	Miss You	Strings
2003	Emi Hinouchi	"Painful"	Painful	Strings
2003	Emi Hinouchi	"Painful" (Stringapella Version)	Painful	Strings
2003	Mika Nakashima	"Resistance"	Love	Keyboard
2003	Mika Nakashima	"Aishiteru"	Love	Keyboard
2003	Wyolica	"Sora to Kaze"	fruits & roots	Arranger, Keyboard
2003	Tasty Jam	"Portrait"	Portrait	Strings
2003	Suneohair	"Fuyu no Tsubasa"	Tokyo Bivouac	Strings
2003	Halcali	"Strawberry Chips"	Strawberry Chips	Strings
2003	Crystal Kay	"Over the Rainbow"	4 Real	Arranger, Keyboard
2003	Keyco	"Mercy"	Mercy	Composer (Co), Keyboard, Co-Producer
2003	Emi Hinouchi	"You Were my Everything"	Dramatiques	Strings
2003	Crystal Kay	"Liberty"	Natural -World Premiere Album-	Arranger, Keyboard
2003	Crystal Kay	"No More Blue Christmas"	Natural -World Premiere Album-	Arranger, Keyboard
2003	Hello! Project	"Natsu Love Romance"	Pucchi Best 4	Programming
2004	Aya Matsuura	"Kanousei no Michi"	×3	Keyboard
2004	Aya Matsuura	"Koishite Gomen ne"	×3	Keyboard
2004	Chemistry	"Interlude"	One×One	Composer, Arranger
2004	Tsunku with Ai Takahashi	"Love (Since 1999)"	Take 1	Arranger, Keyboard
2004	Tsukiko Amano	"Kame" (in Lounge)	Winona Riders ~Tsuki no Uragawa~	Arranger, Keyboard
2004	Toko Furuuchi	"Futsuu no Koto"	Futsuu no Koto	Arranger, Keyboard
2004	Toko Furuuchi	"Superman"	Futsuu no Koto	Arranger, Keyboard
2004	Toko Furuuchi	"Awayuki"	Futsuu no Koto	Arranger, Keyboard
2004	Retro G-Style	"Star"	P.O.P.	Strings
2004	Retro G-Style	"Hora ne"	P.O.P.	Strings
2004	M-Flo loves BoA	"The Love Bug"	The Love Bug	Strings
2004	Daisuke Kawaguchi	"Sun Shower"	Sun Shower	Strings
2004	Bryan	"Tashika ni Tashika ni"	Parallel	Strings
2004	Daisuke Kawaguchi	"Sundance"	Sunshine After Monsoon	Strings
2004	Takayoshi Tsumabuki	"Again"	Aoi Tabibito	Arranger, Keyboard
2004	Hirotaka Mori	"Rainbow Seeker"	Rainbow Seeker	Co-Arranger, Keyboard, Producer
2004	Hirotaka Mori	"Hakujitsu"	Rainbow Seeker	Co-Arranger, Keyboard, Producer
2004	Keyco	"Tsuki to Taiyō"	Seven	Composer (Co), Co-Producer
2004	Keyco	"8 -eight-"	Seven	Keyboard, Co-Producer
2004	Chemistry	"Itoshii Hito" (Single Ver.)	Mirage in Blue/Itoshii Hito (Single Ver.)	Strings
2004	Rip Slyme	"Galaxy"	Galaxy	Brass
2004	Soffet	"Private Beach"	Private Beach	Strings, Brass
2004	Kazuo Zaitsu	"Kokoro no Tabi"	Sabo no Hana (Grown Up)	Arranger, Keyboard
2004	Kazuo Zaitsu	"Musume ga Yomegu Asa"	Sabo no Hana (Grown Up)	Arranger, Keyboard
2004	Chemistry	"Long Long Way"	Long Long Way	Arranger, Keyboard
2004	Yukihiro Fukutomi	"Peace"	Equality	Keyboard
2004	Yukihiro Fukutomi	"Love is To Blame"	Equality	Keyboard
2004	Captain Straydum	"No Ten Flower"	Mountain a Go Go Two	Brass
2004	Soul'd Out	"Blues"	Blues	Strings
2004	Rip Slyme	"Prologue"	Masterpiece	Strings, Brass, Woodwinds
2004	Rip Slyme	"Masterpiece"	Masterpiece	Strings, Brass, Woodwinds
2004	Rip Slyme	"Epilogue"	Masterpiece	Strings, Brass, Woodwinds
2004	Rip Slyme	"Asayake Surround"	Masterpiece	Arranger, Keyboard
2004	Marianne Amplifier feat. Yuka	"Kanashii Yokan"	‘Tsukuyomi’ Ending Theme ‘Kanashii Yokan’ / Insert Song ‘Nami no Toriko ni Naru You ni’	Strings
2004	Aya Ueto	"Sekaijū ga Happy Birthday"	Re.	Arranger, Keyboard
2004	Naohito Fujiki	"Yurikago"	Colorman	Arranger, Keyboard
2004	Morning Musume	"Manatsu no Kōsen" (Early Version)	Morning Musume Early Single Box	Arranger, Keyboard
2004	September	"Fuyu no Sonata 〜Saisho kara Ima made〜" (Winter Ver.)	Utsukushiki Hibi 〜Yakusoku〜	Co-Arranger
2005	Soul'd Out	"To All Tha Dreamers"	To All Tha Dreamers (Single)	Strings, Brass
2005	Chemistry	"Kokoro no Door"	Hot Chemistry	Arranger, Keyboard
2005	Soul'd Out	"Stardust"	To All Tha Dreamers (Album)	Strings
2005	Soul'd Out	"Nita Nita Therapy"	To All Tha Dreamers (Album)	Brass
2005	Chemistry	"Kimi ga Iru"	Kimi ga Iru	Arranger, Keyboard
2005	Chemistry & Lena Park	"Dance With Me" (Korea / Japan Ver.)	Kimi ga Iru	Co-Arranger, Keyboard
2005	Tsukiko Amano	"Hisui"	Hisui	Arranger
2005	Tsukiko Amano	"Camellia 〜Ai no Version"	Hisui	Arranger
2005	Tsukiko Amano	"Hone 〜Ai no Version"	Hisui	Arranger
2005	Masatoshi Nakamura	"Utsusemi"	Utsusemi	Arranger, Keyboard
2005	Sister Q	"Night and Day"	Night and Day	Arranger, Keyboard
2005	Three Tight B	"Sonzai"	Sonzai	Co-Arranger
2005	Sarablend	"Sakura Hira Hira Honoo Meramera"	Sakura Hira Hira Honoo Meramera	Arranger, Keyboard
2005	Masayuki Suzuki	"Sayonara no Mukou Gawa"	Yamaguchi Momoe Tribute Thank You For…part2	Performance
2005	Faith	"Love Song"	Love Song	Co-Strings
2005	Les.R	"Koi no Mahou"	Koi no Mahou	Arranger, Keyboard
2005	Yui Makino	"Amrita"	Amrita	Strings, Keyboard
2005	M-Flo loves Miliyah Kato	"One Day"	Beat Space Nine	Strings
2005	M-Flo loves Monday Michiru	"A.D.D.P."	Beat Space Nine	Strings
2005	M-Flo loves Yoshika	"let go"	Beat Space Nine	Strings
2005	M-Flo loves Lisa	"Tripod Baby"	Beat Space Nine	Strings
2005	Ahhco	"About Us?"	Made in Love	Arranger, Keyboard
2005	Sonim	"Chiisana Yotabi"	Digital Release	Arranger, Keyboard
2005	Faith	"Sweet Way"	Sweet Way	Co-Strings
2005	Source	"We Are All Alone"	Ka-Ke-Ha-Shi	Strings
2005	Arp	"Koibushii"	Life Palette	Arranger
2005	Arp	"Starlight Stardust"	Life Palette	Arranger
2005	Chemistry	"Dance With Me feat. Gaku-MC"	Fo(u)r	Co-Arranger, Keyboard
2005	September	"Mizukagami"	UNO	Arranger
2005	September	"I Love You"	UNO	Arranger
2005	Takaki Horigome	"Zekkou"	Home Ground	Co-Arranger, Co-Producer
2005	Takaki Horigome	"Fuyu Kitarinaba"	Home Ground	Co-Arranger, Co-Producer
2005	Takaki Horigome	"Parade wa Naze Isogu"	Home Ground	Co-Arranger, Co-Producer
2005	Takaki Horigome	"Namida no Money Laundering"	Home Ground	Co-Arranger, Co-Producer
2005	Toko Furuuchi	"Kokoro mo Tsurete"	Cashmere Music	Arranger, Keyboard
2005	Toko Furuuchi	"Door o Tataku You ni"	Cashmere Music	Arranger, Keyboard
2005	Toko Furuuchi	"Gerbera"	Cashmere Music	Arranger, Keyboard
2005	Toko Furuuchi	"Good Friend"	Cashmere Music	Arranger, Keyboard
2005	Toko Furuuchi	"Pale Moon"	Cashmere Music	Arranger, Keyboard
2005	Soffet	"Kigurumi Master"	Kigurumi Master	Strings, Brass, Keyboard
2006	Faith	"2girls 〜in the sepiatone〜"	2girls 〜in the sepiatone〜	Co-Strings
2006	Rie	"Tender Love"	Tender Love	Composer, Arranger, Keyboard
2006	Angela Aki	"Kokoro no Senshi"	Kokoro no Senshi	Strings
2006	Faith	"Precious Place"	Letter To The Future	Co-Strings
2006	Faith	"The Long Sailing"	Letter To The Future	Co-Strings
2006	Aiko Okumura	"Anata no Pilaf"	Nijiiro Namida	Arranger
2006	Crystal Kay	"Telepathy"	Call me Miss...	Composer (Co), Arranger, Keyboard
2006	Crystal Kay	"KTK"	Call me Miss...	Composer (Co), Arranger, Keyboard
2006	Crystal Kay	"I Know"	Call me Miss...	Strings
2006	Crystal Kay	"Kiss (Orchestra Version)"	Call me Miss...	Arranger, Keyboard
2006	Mika Nakashima	"Cry No More"	Cry No More	Arranger, Keyboard
2006	Mika Nakashima	"Black & Blue"	Cry No More	Arranger, Keyboard
2006	Angela Aki	"Kiss Me Good-Bye"	Kiss Me Good-Bye	Strings
2006	Nami Uehara	"15 Carat"	15 Carat	Arranger
2006	Yui Makino	"Amefuribana"	Euphoria	Keyboard
2006	Angela Aki	"This Love"	This Love	Strings
2006	Coil	"Misuzu to Kishi"	‘Hatsukoi’ Original Soundtrack	Keyboard
2006	Coil	"Nikki"	‘Hatsukoi’ Original Soundtrack	Arranger
2006	Chitose Hajime	"Ao no Requiem" (film version)	‘Hatsukoi’ Original Soundtrack	Arranger
2006	Mika Nakashima	"All Hands Together"	All Hands Together	Arranger, Keyboard
2006	Angela Aki	"Love Is Over Now"	Home	Strings
2006	September	"Mizuiro no Ame"	Akai Ito	Arranger, Keyboard
2006	The Little Bits	"Futari no Love Land"	Futari no Love Land	Keyboard
2006	Round Table featuring Nino	"Puzzle"	Puzzle	Strings
2006	Kohei Toda	"Yasashii Dake no Otoko"	Yasashii Dake no Otoko	Arranger, Performance
2006	Tomoyuki Nagasawa	"Bokura no Kagayaki"	Bokura no Kagayaki	Strings, Keyboard
2006	Faith	"Feel"	Feel	Co-Strings
2006	Mai	"Moon Tears"	Princess ∞ Candy	Arranger, Keyboard
2006	Round Table featuring Nino	"Just a Little"	Nino	Strings
2006	Soffet	"everlasting one"	everlasting one	Strings
2006	Isabelle Antena	"The French Riviera"	French Riviera	Keyboard
2006	Isabelle Antena	"Just For You And Me"	French Riviera	Keyboard
2006	Soul'd Out	"Starlight Destiny"	Starlight Destiny	Strings, Brass
2006	Ji ma ma	"Kazetayori"	Kazetayori	Arranger, Keyboard
2006	Halfby	"Halfbeat"	Halfbeat	Brass
2006	Rip Slyme	"Blow"	Blow	Strings
2006	Limelight	"Stay Gold"	Stay Gold	Strings, Keyboard
2006	Kohei Toda	"Hi ni Mukau"	Hi ni Mukau	Strings
2006	Faith	"Seraphic"	Seraphic	Co-Strings
2006	Tsukiko Amano	"Love Dealer-2006-"	Deluxe Catalog	Brass
2006	Soffet	"Life"	Life	Strings
2006	Hiromi Go	"Kono Yoru no Mukou Gawa"	Winter Mood	Arranger, Keyboard
2006	Hiromi Go	"Extra Times"	Winter Mood	Arranger, Keyboard
2006	Toko Furuuchi	"Yozora no Moment"	Wanna Be the Piano Man	Arranger, Keyboard
2006	Limelight	"Call & Response"	Pop Land	Strings
2006	Yui Makino	"Shiawase no Tameiki"	Tenkyuu no Ongaku	Arranger, Bass
2006	Yui Makino	"Natsuyasumi no Shukudai"	Tenkyuu no Ongaku	Arranger, Keyboard
2006	Yui Makino	"Amefuribana" (Album Version)	Tenkyuu no Ongaku	Arranger, Keyboard
2006	Yui Makino	"Amrita"	Tenkyuu no Ongaku	Strings
2006	Chara	"Hitomi wa Diamond"	Jewel Songs: Seiko Matsuda Tribute & Covers	Strings
2006	Rip Slyme	"Present" (X'mas version)	Digital Release	Keyboard
2006	Yukari Tamura	"Koi no Chikara"	Princess Rose	Arranger, Keyboard
2007	Faith	"Eien no Jikan"	Eien no Jikan	Co-Strings
2007	Suneohair	"Yasashii Uta"	Skirt	Strings
2007	Ataru Nakamura	"Kaze ni Naru"	Kaze ni Naru	Arranger
2007	Wise	"Shine like a star"	Shine like a star	Strings
2007	Angela Aki	"Power of Music"	Sakurairo	Arranger
2007	Faith	"Accessory"	Invention	Co-Strings
2007	Faith	"The Score"	Invention	Co-Strings
2007	Faith	"Get Crazy"	Invention	Co-Strings
2007	Faith	"I'm here"	Invention	Co-Strings
2007	Mika Nakashima	"Going Back Home"	Yes	Arranger, Keyboard
2007	Mika Nakashima	"Kinen Uta"	Yes	Arranger, Keyboard
2007	Halfby	"Star Track"	Star Track	Brass
2007	Kousuke Atari	"Hana"	Hana	Arranger, Keyboard
2007	Chisato Moritaka	"La La La Driving La La La Lafesta"	La La La Driving La La La Lafesta	Composer, Arranger
2007	Hiromi Go	"Come On Baby"	Boom Boom Boom/Come On Baby	Arranger
2007	Fonogenico	"Orange no Suna"	Orange no Suna	Arranger
2007	Bennie K	"Aoi Tori"	The World	Strings
2007	Bennie K	"Around the World 〜Reprise〜"	The World	Arranger, Keyboard
2007	Wise	"Thinking of you"	Thinking of you	Strings
2007	Takacha	"Tsuyogari"	Tsuyogari	Co-Arranger, Keyboard
2007	Yu Yamada	"Fly So High"	Fly So High	Strings
2007	Crystal Kay	"Anytime"	All Yours	Composer (Co), Arranger, Keyboard
2007	Crystal Kay	"Anata no Soba de"	All Yours	Arranger, Keyboard
2007	Crystal Kay	"Kitto Eien ni"	All Yours	Arranger, Keyboard
2007	Kousuke Atari	"Sayonara no Nai Koi"	Yurai Hana	Arranger, Keyboard
2007	Ji ma ma	"Omoi Fumi"	Hadashi Karabisaa	Arranger, Keyboard
2007	Rip Slyme	"One" (Christmas Classic version)	Netsutaiya	Strings
2007	Kohei Toda	"Ureshi Namida"	Ureshi Namida	Strings
2007	Chitose Hajime	"Anata ga Koko ni Ite Hoshii"	Anata ga Koko ni Ite Hoshii	Strings
2007	Rie fu	"5000 Mile"	5000 Mile	Strings
2007	Angela Aki	"Again"	Today	Arranger
2007	Rip Slyme	"Wonderful" (Christmas Classic version)	Speed King	Strings
2007	Kousuke Atari	"Tane o Maku Hibi"	Tane o Maku Hibi	Arranger, Keyboard
2007	Fonogenico	"Kimi ga Inai"	Kimi ga Inai	Arranger
2007	Faith	"Two Futures"	Two Futures	Co-Strings
2007	Faith	"Koi no Tenshi 〜Otome no Inori〜"	Two Futures	Co-Strings
2008	Faith	"Princess"	faith	Co-Strings
2008	Faith	"Koi no Tenshi: Otome no Inori" (album ver.)	faith	Co-Strings
2008	Faith	"U&I"	faith	Co-Strings
2008	Faith	"Gold"	faith	Co-Strings
2008	Faith	"Tabibitotachi no Koushin"	faith	Co-Strings
2008	Soul'd Out	"Voodoo Kingdom"	Attitude	Strings
2008	Soul'd Out	"Shuffle Dayz Pt.2"	Attitude	Brass
2008	Soul'd Out	"Widespread Panic"	Attitude	Brass
2008	Soul'd Out	"Grown Kidz"	Attitude	Strings
2008	Sachi Tainaka	"Visit of Love"	Visit of Love	Arranger, Keyboard
2008	Kumami	"Ame no Tsubasa"	Ame no Tsubasa	Arranger
2008	Rythem	"Kubisuji Line"	Kubisuji Line	Keyboard
2008	Rythem	"Aishikata"	Kubisuji Line	Keyboard
2008	Kumami	"Close to U 〜For Gloomy Weekend〜"	but…Life goes on	Arranger
2008	Kumami	"Express 168"	but…Life goes on	Arranger
2008	Mika Nakashima	"Sakura (Hanagasumi)"	Sakura (Hanagasumi)	Keyboard
2008	Yui Makino	"Marmalade"	Makino Yui.	Keyboard
2008	Yui Makino	"Watashi ni Tsuite"	Makino Yui.	Composer, Arranger
2008	Kousuke Atari	"Haru"	Haru	Arranger, Keyboard
2008	Akiko Wada	"Eien ga Mieru Basho"	Wada Ya	Strings
2008	Cliff Edge	"Liv: Taisetsu na Anata e"	to You	Strings
2008	Hiromi Go	"Somebody stop me"	Kimi Dake o	Arranger, Keyboard
2008	Masatoshi Nakamura	"Namida"	Namida	Arranger, Keyboard
2008	Masatoshi Nakamura	"Sumire Iro no Sora ni"	Namida	Arranger, Keyboard
2008	PureBoys	"Psyche na Heart"	Kimi no Te/Psyche na Heart	Keyboard
2008	Coil	"Anata ga Koko ni Ite Hoshii"	Garcon	Strings
2008	Rythem	"Akari no Arika"	Love Call/Akari no Arika	Arranger, Keyboard
2008	Crystal Kay	"Kaerimichi"	Color Change!	Arranger, Keyboard
2008	Tsukiko Amano	"Howling"	Zero	Strings, Keyboard
2008	Emiri Miyamoto	"Tears"	Tears	Composer, Arranger
2008	Manami Kurose with 12 Violins	"Rensoukyoku"	Rensoukyoku	Arranger
2008	Angela Aki	"Tegami (Haikei Jūgo no Kimi e)" (strings version)	Tegami (Haikei Jūgo no Kimi e)	Strings
2008	Kousuke Atari	"Kaze yo feat. Houmi"	Kizuna Uta	Arranger, Keyboard
2008	Kousuke Atari	"Yoake Mae"	Kizuna Uta	Arranger, Keyboard
2008	Kousuke Atari	"Yasoukyoku 〜nocturne" (album version)	Kizuna Uta	Strings
2008	Faith	"I Believe"	I believe	Co-Strings
2008	Faith	"Koi no Tenshi: Otome no Inori" (Child's Angel mix)	I believe	Co-Strings
2008	Rhythm	"Smile"	23	Arranger, Keyboard
2008	Toko Furuuchi	"Hobaku"	In Love Again	Arranger, Keyboard, Producer
2008	Toko Furuuchi	"Koi no Fushigi"	In Love Again	Arranger, Keyboard, Producer
2008	Toko Furuuchi	"In Love Again"	In Love Again	Arranger, Keyboard, Producer
2008	Toko Furuuchi	"Casanova"	In Love Again	Arranger, Keyboard, Producer
2008	Toko Furuuchi	"Konya Bed de"	In Love Again	Arranger, Keyboard, Producer
2008	Toko Furuuchi	"Kaeru Basho wa Anata"	In Love Again	Arranger, Keyboard, Producer
2008	Toko Furuuchi	"Hanbun Dake"	In Love Again	Arranger, Keyboard, Producer
2008	Toko Furuuchi	"Beautiful Days -New Version-"	In Love Again	Arranger, Keyboard, Producer
2008	Coil	"Niji no Kioku"	Vitamin C	Strings, Keyboard
2008	Akiko	"Universal Love"	What's Jazz? -Spirit-	Keyboard
2008	Yukihiro Fukutomi	"Here and Now"	Contact	Keyboard
2008	Diggy-MO'	"Bakusou Yumeka"	Bakusou Yumeka	Strings
2008	Mika Nakashima	"Trust Your Voice"	Voice	Arranger, Keyboard
2008	RSP with Da Bubble Gum Brothers	"La・La・La Love Song 〜Koko kara Hajimaru Koi Monogatari〜"	La・La・La Love Song 〜Koko kara Hajimaru Koi Monogatari〜	Strings, Brass
2009	Maaya Sakamoto	"Get No Satisfaction"	Kazeyomi	Arranger, Keyboard
2009	Maaya Sakamoto	"Colors"	Kazeyomi	Arranger, Keyboard
2009	Nao Matsushita	"Villefranche"	PF	Arranger
2009	Sekaiichi	"Present"	Sekaiichi	Keyboard
2009	Rip Slyme	"Stairs"	Stairs	Strings
2009	Rip Slyme	"Love & Hate"	Stairs	Co-Arranger
2009	Juju	"Kimi ga Iru Kara -My Best Friends-"	What's Love?	Arranger, Keyboard
2009	12 Violins feat. Keizo Nakanishi	"Pale Moon Blue"	i Meets...	Strings
2009	12 Violins feat. Surface	"Uso×Uso〜fake×fake〜"	i Meets...	Strings
2009	Kousuke Atari	"Sora ga Sora"	Sora ga Sora	Arranger, Keyboard
2009	Soffet	"More than I love you 〜365 no Kiseki〜 with May's"	Jam the Universe	Strings, Brass
2009	Clench & Blista	"Arigatou Sayonara feat. Satomi"	One Life One Love	Strings
2009	Toko Furuuchi × Kreva	"Slow Beat"	A to XYZ/Slow Beat	Co-Arranger, Keyboard
2009	Peaky Salt	"Mikazuki Halfpipe"	Mikazuki Halfpipe	Keyboard
2009	Ai Otsuka × Su from Rip Slyme	"Aisu×Time"	Love is Best	Co-Arranger
2009	Maaya Sakamoto	"Magic Number"	Magic Number	Strings, Keyboard
2009	Maaya Sakamoto	"Kazamidori" (live ver.)	Magic Number	Strings, Keyboard
2009	Maaya Sakamoto	"Pocket o Kara ni Shite" (live ver.)	Magic Number	Strings, Keyboard

=== 2010s - 2020s ===
Year	Artist	Title	Album	Work
2010	Mika Nakashima	"Baby Baby Baby"	Always	Arranger
2010	Mika Nakashima	"Spiral"	Always	Arranger
2010	ET-King	"Sakurasaku"	Sakurasaku	Strings
2010	Toko Furuuchi	"Love Songs"	Purple	Keyboards, Producer
2010	Toko Furuuchi	"Purple"	Purple	Keyboards, Producer
2010	Toko Furuuchi	"Where You Are"	Purple	Keyboards, Producer
2010	Toko Furuuchi	"Eiga o Miyou"	Purple	Keyboards, Producer
2010	Toko Furuuchi	"Pages"	Purple	Keyboards, Producer
2010	Toko Furuuchi	"Namida"	Purple	Keyboards, Producer
2010	Toko Furuuchi	"Hiroi Sheet ni Hitorikiri"	Purple	Keyboards, Producer
2010	Toko Furuuchi	"Collage"	Purple	Keyboards, Producer
2010	Toko Furuuchi	"Boyfriend"	Purple	Keyboards, Producer
2010	Toko Furuuchi	"Lesson"	Purple	Keyboards, Producer
2010	Toko Furuuchi	"Taiyou"	Purple	Keyboards, Producer
2010	ET-King	"Aishii Hito e 2010"	Single Collection!	Keyboards
2010	Maaya Sakamoto	"Everywhere"	Everywhere	Keyboards
2010	Tiara	"Love Is… with KG"	Love Is… with KG / Suki de Iisasete	Strings
2010	Kosuke Nakajima	"Aishiki Hito e"	Ugamiuta ~Kizuna, Sono Te ni~	Arranger, Keyboards
2010	Crystal Kay	"Happy"	Flash	Arranger, Keyboards
2010	Suneohair	"Sarari"	Reverse Bridge	Strings
2010	Diggy-MO'	"Arcadia"	Diggyism II	Strings
2010	unistyle	"Ataerareru Mono"	Unistyle	Strings, Keyboards
2010	unistyle	"Hundreds of Miles"	Unistyle	Strings, Keyboards
2010	Tsubakiya Quartet	"Ryuuseigun"	Kodoku no Campanella o Narase	Arranger, Keyboards
2010	Angela Aki	"Ai to Bansoukou"	Life	Strings
2010	Angela Aki	"Life" (Co-Composer)	Life	Strings
2010	Crystal Kay	"Cannonball"	10-nen Saki mo Kimi ni Koishite OST	Composer, Arranger, Keyboards
2010	ACO	"Bara-iro no Sekai"	Devil's Hands	Arranger, Keyboards, Bass
2010	Sweet Licious	"Yozora no Melody feat. C"	Sweet Licious	Arranger, Strings
2010	Sweet Licious	"Destiny" (Album Version)	Sweet Licious	Arranger, Strings
2010	Rythem	"A Flower"	A Flower	Co-Arranger, Keyboards
2010	Ayumi Sakai	"Shiawase no Rule"	Shiawase no Rule	Arranger
2010	Rythem	"Life Tree"	Rhythm	Co-Arranger, Keyboards
2010	Rythem	"Homey"	Rhythm	Co-Arranger, Keyboards
2010	Rythem	"1 Piece"	Rhythm	Co-Arranger, Keyboards
2010	Rythem	"All-Ways"	Rhythm	Co-Arranger, Keyboards
2010	Rythem	"Allie"	Rhythm	Arranger, Strings
2010	Crystal Kay	"Time of Love"	Spin the Music	Composer, Arranger, Keyboards
2011	Maaya Sakamoto	"Kimi no Sei"	You Can't Catch Me	Arranger, Keyboards
2011	Maaya Sakamoto	"Topia"	You Can't Catch Me	Arranger, Keyboards
2011	Maaya Sakamoto	"Everywhere -Piano & Vocal-"	You Can't Catch Me	Arranger, Keyboards
2011	Toko Furuuchi	"Devotion"	Transparent	Arranger, Strings
2011	Toko Furuuchi	"All"	Transparent	Arranger, Strings
2011	Toko Furuuchi	"Kataomoi"	Transparent	Arranger, Strings
2011	Tsuyoshi	"Love Song ~Hikariabite~"	All About Love	Strings
2011	Mika Nakashima	"A Miracle for You" (2011)	Dear	Arranger, Keyboards
2011	Yui Makino	"Harumachi Kaze"	Holography	Arranger, Keyboards
2011	Yui Makino	"Nidome no Hatsukoi"	Holography	Arranger, Keyboards
2011	Nikiie	"Ajisai"	*(Notes)	Arranger, Keyboards
2011	Nikiie	"Little Summer"	*(Notes)	Arranger, Keyboards
2011	Totto	"Glass Fuki"	Try! Angle	Arranger, Keyboards
2011	Totto	"Crayon"	Try! Angle	Arranger, Keyboards
2011	Totto	"Inaka Mikan"	Try! Angle	Arranger, Keyboards
2011	Takumi Saito	"Sansan"	Sansan	Arranger, Keyboards
2011	Takumi Saito	"Te to Te"	Sansan	Arranger, Keyboards
2011	Kumi Atsuta	"Tonari no Totoro"	Ghibli no Mori no Natsu Bossa	Arranger, Keyboards
2011	Kumi Atsuta	"Yasashisa ni Tsutsumareta Nara"	Ghibli no Mori no Natsu Bossa	Arranger, Keyboards
2011	Kumi Atsuta	"Kaze no Tani no Nausicaä"	Ghibli no Mori no Natsu Bossa	Arranger, Keyboards
2011	Kumi Atsuta	"Kimi o Nosete"	Ghibli no Mori no Natsu Bossa	Arranger, Keyboards
2011	Kumi Atsuta	"Gake no Ue no Ponyo"	Ghibli no Mori no Natsu Bossa	Arranger, Keyboards
2011	Kumi Atsuta	"Itsumo Nando Demo"	Ghibli no Mori no Natsu Bossa	Arranger, Keyboards
2011	Kumi Atsuta	"Country Road"	Ghibli no Mori no Natsu Bossa	Arranger, Keyboards
2011	Kumi Atsuta	"Ai wa Hana, Kimi wa Sono Tane"	Ghibli no Mori no Natsu Bossa	Arranger, Keyboards
2011	Kumi Atsuta	"Kaze ni Naru"	Ghibli no Mori no Natsu Bossa	Arranger, Keyboards
2011	Kumi Atsuta	"Rouge no Dengon"	Ghibli no Mori no Natsu Bossa	Arranger, Keyboards
2011	Angela Aki	"Tsugaru Kaikyo Fuyugeshiki"	White	Arranger, Keyboards
2011	Angela Aki	"My Grandfather's Clock"	White	Arranger, Keyboards
2011	Kosuke Nakajima	"Koi"	Kiseki no Kakera	Arranger, Keyboards
2011	Maaya Sakamoto	"Driving in the Silence"	Driving in the Silence	Arranger, Keyboards, Producer
2011	Maaya Sakamoto	"Sayonara Santa"	Driving in the Silence	Arranger, Keyboards, Producer
2011	Maaya Sakamoto	"Melt the Snow in Me"	Driving in the Silence	Arranger, Keyboards, Producer
2011	Maaya Sakamoto	"Homemade Christmas"	Driving in the Silence	Arranger, Keyboards, Producer
2011	Maaya Sakamoto	"Kotoshi Ichiban"	Driving in the Silence	Arranger, Keyboards, Producer
2011	Maaya Sakamoto	"Tatoeba Ringo ga Te ni Ochiru You ni"	Driving in the Silence	Arranger, Keyboards, Producer
2011	Maaya Sakamoto	"Kyokuya"	Driving in the Silence	Arranger, Keyboards, Producer
2011	Maaya Sakamoto	"Chikai"	Driving in the Silence	Arranger, Keyboards, Producer
2011	Maaya Sakamoto	"Driving in the Silence -Reprise-"	Driving in the Silence	Arranger, Keyboards, Producer
2011	Hermin	"Melody" (Japanese Ver.)	Melody	Arranger, Keyboards
2011	Hermin	"Juunen no Saigetsu" (Japanese Ver.)	Melody	Arranger, Keyboards
2011	Hermin	"Melody" (Korean Ver.)	Melody	Arranger, Keyboards
2011	Hermin	"Juunen no Saigetsu" (Korean Ver.)	Melody	Arranger, Keyboards
2012	Angela Aki	"Material Girl"	Songbook	Arranger, Keyboards
2012	Angela Aki	"True Colors"	Songbook	Arranger, Keyboards
2012	Angela Aki	"Without You"	Songbook	Co-Arranger, Keyboards
2012	Shota Shimizu	"The Day"	Naturally	Arranger, Keyboards
2012	Toko Furuuchi	"Egao"	Yume no Tsuzuki	Arranger, Keyboards, Producer
2012	Toko Furuuchi	"Yume no Tsuzuki"	Yume no Tsuzuki	Arranger, Keyboards, Producer
2012	Toko Furuuchi	"Fuyu no Owari"	Yume no Tsuzuki	Arranger, Keyboards, Producer
2012	Toko Furuuchi	"Koko Made Kuru Tame ni"	Yume no Tsuzuki	Arranger, Keyboards, Producer
2012	Toko Furuuchi	"Jikan o Tomete"	Yume no Tsuzuki	Arranger, Keyboards, Producer
2012	Toko Furuuchi	"Nagareboshi"	Yume no Tsuzuki	Arranger, Keyboards, Producer
2012	Toko Furuuchi	"Zutto Sagashiteta"	Yume no Tsuzuki	Arranger, Keyboards, Producer
2012	Toko Furuuchi	"Ano Heya ni Kaerou"	Yume no Tsuzuki	Arranger, Keyboards, Producer
2012	Toko Furuuchi	"Nani mo Iwazu ni Sayonara o"	Yume no Tsuzuki	Arranger, Keyboards, Producer
2012	Toko Furuuchi	"Compass"	Yume no Tsuzuki	Arranger, Keyboards, Producer
2012	Toko Furuuchi	"Jikan o Tomete" (Monochrome Version)	Yume no Tsuzuki	Arranger, Keyboards, Producer
2012	Maaya Sakamoto	"Road Interlude"	Live 2011 "In the Silence"	Composer, Keyboards
2013	Solita	"Girl"	Girl OST	Composer, Arranger, Keyboards
2013	Solita	"I Love the Eighties"	Girl OST	Composer, Arranger, Keyboards
2013	Steve Sidwell Big Band	"Saturday Nite!"	Girl OST	Arranger
2013	Takumi Saito	"Zutto…"	One More Try!!	Arranger, Keyboards
2013	Angela Aki	"Yoake Mae no Inori"	Blue	Arranger, Keyboards
2013	Angela Aki	"One Family" (Uchuu no Nagisa Special Version)	Blue	Arranger, Keyboards
2013	Kaori Sawada	"Fairy Tale"	Prism	Co-Arranger
2013	Mika Nakashima	"Ashita Sekai ga Owaru Nara"	Ashita Sekai ga Owaru Nara	Arranger, Keyboards
2013	Morning Musume	"Love Innovation"	Wakuteka Take a Chance	Programmer
2013	Mika Nakashima	"Ashita Sekai ga Owaru Nara" (World's End Ver.)	Hatsukoi	Keyboards
2013	Mika Nakashima	"Epilogue"	Real	Keyboards
2013	Yanagi Nagi	"Replica"	Zoetrope	Keyboards
2013	Toko Furuuchi	"Reason"	And Then… ~20th Anniversary Best~	Arranger, Keyboards, Producer
2013	Toko Furuuchi	"Sayonara Restaurant feat. Ken Hirai"	And Then… ~20th Anniversary Best~	Arranger, Keyboards, Producer
2013	Toko Furuuchi	"Dare Yori Suki na no ni feat. Noriyuki Makihara"	And Then… ~20th Anniversary Best~	Arranger, Keyboards, Producer
2013	Toko Furuuchi	"Kokyo"	And Then… ~20th Anniversary Best~	Arranger, Keyboards, Producer
2013	Kasarinchu	"Aru ga Mama ni"	Suu-chan Mai-chan Sawako-san OST	Arranger, Keyboards
2013	Namie Amuro	"Beautiful"	Big Boys Cry/Beautiful	Keyboards
2013	Maaya Sakamoto	"Tooku"	Singer-Songwriter	Arranger, Keyboards
2013	Maaya Sakamoto	"Everywhere ~HAL Mix"	Singer-Songwriter	Arranger, Keyboards
2013	Maaya Sakamoto	"Kaminari"	Singer-Songwriter	Arranger, Keyboards
2013	Maaya Sakamoto	"Chikai ~Saw Edition"	Singer-Songwriter	Arranger, Keyboards
2013	Maaya Sakamoto	"Singer Songwriter"	Singer-Songwriter	Arranger, Keyboards
2013	Rip Slyme	"Long Vacation"	Long Vacation	Keyboards
2013	Cute	"Attakai Ude de Tsutsunde"	Kanashiki Amefuri / Adam to Eve no Dilemma	Arranger
2013	Maaya Sakamoto	"Medley 'Roots of SSW'" (Live)	Hajimari no Umi	Keyboards
2013	Nao Matsushita	"Nakeru Hodo Aitai"	Woman	Arranger
2013	Rip Slyme	"Sly"	Sly	Strings, Woodwinds
2013	Apriori	"Golden Time"	Golden Time	Keyboards
2014	Shota Shimizu	"You've Got a Friend"	Encore	Arranger
2014	Shota Shimizu	"Singer Songwriter no Uta"	Encore	Arranger
2014	sleepy.ac	"Andromeda"	Live @Gloria Chapel	Strings
2014	sleepy.ac	"Earth"	Live @Gloria Chapel	Strings
2014	sleepy.ac	"Machi"	Live @Gloria Chapel	Strings
2014	sleepy.ac	"Darkness"	Live @Gloria Chapel	Strings
2014	sleepy.ac	"Lost"	Live @Gloria Chapel	Strings
2014	Masatoshi Nakamura	"Kimi ga Ite Kureta Kara"	Wasurenai	Arranger, Keyboards
2014	Masatoshi Nakamura	"Hana wa Saku"	Wasurenai	Arranger, Keyboards
2014	Ayano Uema	"Hajimete no Umi"	Hajimete no Umi	Arranger
2014	Koyama-gumi	"Technopolis"	Digital Release (Remastered Version on Koyama-gumi, 2018)	Arranger
2014	Reiko Umenara	"Beautiful Name"	Digital Release	Arranger, Keyboards, Producer
2014	Reiko Umenara	"Watarasebashi"	Digital Release	Arranger, Keyboards, Producer
2014	Kaname Kawabata	"Flavor of Life"	On the Way Home	Arranger, Keyboards
2014	Kaname Kawabata	"Mikazuki"	On the Way Home	Arranger, Keyboards
2014	Kaname Kawabata	"Yasashii Kiss o Shite"	On the Way Home	Arranger, Keyboards
2014	Smile Again	"Hoi"	Non-commercial Release	Arranger
2015	Mika Nakashima	"Relaxin' with Mika #1" (Interlude and Poetry Reading)	~Healing Collection~ Relaxin	Composer, Arranger, All Instruments
2015	Mika Nakashima	"Relaxin' with Mika #2" (Interlude and Poetry Reading)	~Healing Collection~ Relaxin	Composer, Arranger, All Instruments
2015	Mika Nakashima	"Relaxin' with Mika #3" (Interlude and Poetry Reading)	~Healing Collection~ Relaxin	Composer, Arranger, All Instruments
2015	Mika Nakashima	"Relaxin' with Mika #4" (Interlude and Poetry Reading)	~Healing Collection~ Relaxin	Composer, Arranger, All Instruments
2015	Mika Nakashima	"Relaxin' with Mika #5" (Interlude and Poetry Reading)	~Healing Collection~ Relaxin	Composer, Arranger, All Instruments
2015	Mika Nakashima	"Relaxin' with Mika #6" (Interlude and Poetry Reading)	~Healing Collection~ Relaxin	Composer, Arranger, All Instruments
2015	Mika Nakashima	"Relaxin' with Mika #7" (Interlude and Poetry Reading)	~Healing Collection~ Relaxin	Composer, Arranger, All Instruments
2015	Mika Nakashima	"Relaxin' with Mika #8" (Interlude and Poetry Reading)	~Healing Collection~ Relaxin	Composer, Arranger, All Instruments
2015	Mika Nakashima	"Relaxin' with Mika #9" (Interlude and Poetry Reading)	~Healing Collection~ Relaxin	Composer, Arranger, All Instruments
2015	Mika Nakashima	"Relaxin' with Mika #10" (Interlude and Poetry Reading)	~Healing Collection~ Relaxin	Composer, Arranger, All Instruments
2015	Ryoei	"Koi o Shita"	Koi o Shita / Suki ni Natte mo Ii Desu ka	Arranger, Keyboards, Brass
2015	Rip Slyme	"Peace"	Peace / Kono Michi o Yukou / Naisho de Onegai Shimasu	Brass
2015	Masatoshi Nakamura	"Hajimete no Sora"	Hajimete no Sora	Arranger, Keyboards
2015	Masatoshi Nakamura	"Megumi"	Hajimete no Sora	Arranger, Keyboards
2015	Maaya Sakamoto	"Korekara"	Follow Me Up	Arranger, Keyboards
2015	Maaya Sakamoto	"Kasukana Melody"	Follow Me Up	Arranger, Keyboards
2015	Yasushi Nakanishi	"Akibigasa"	Akibigasa	Arranger
2015	Mika Nakashima	"Ai no Uta"	Hanataba	Arranger
2016	Hajime Mizoguchi	"Lovin' You"	Love Sounds	Programmer
2016	Hajime Mizoguchi	"Shukujo no Omoi"	Love Sounds	Programmer
2016	Hajime Mizoguchi	"Kawaii Aisha"	Love Sounds	Programmer
2016	Hajime Mizoguchi	"Sentimental Wave"	Love Sounds	Programmer
2016	Toko Furuuchi	"Ai no Tame ni feat. Tetsuya Okuda"	Toko Furuuchi with 10 Legends	Co-Arranger, Producer
2016	Toko Furuuchi	"Lonely Chaplin feat. Masayoshi Suzuki"	Toko Furuuchi with 10 Legends	Co-Arranger, Producer
2016	Toko Furuuchi	"Another Orion feat. Fumiya Fujii"	Toko Furuuchi with 10 Legends	Co-Arranger, Producer
2016	Toko Furuuchi	"Baby I Love You feat. TEE"	Toko Furuuchi with 10 Legends	Co-Arranger, Producer
2016	Toko Furuuchi	"Don't Cry Baby feat. Kazutoshi Saito"	Toko Furuuchi with 10 Legends	Co-Arranger, Producer
2016	Toko Furuuchi	"Soshite Boku wa Tofuni Kureru feat. Yoshiyuki Ohsawa"	Toko Furuuchi with 10 Legends	Co-Arranger, Producer
2016	Toko Furuuchi	"Hana no Toki, Ai no Toki feat. Kiyoshi Maekawa"	Toko Furuuchi with 10 Legends	Co-Arranger, Producer
2016	Toko Furuuchi	"Love Songs feat. Yoshikuni Dochin"	Toko Furuuchi with 10 Legends	Co-Arranger, Producer
2016	Maaya Sakamoto	"Million Clouds"	Million Clouds	Arranger
2016	Maaya Sakamoto	"Romashika"	Million Clouds	Arranger
2016	Maaya Sakamoto	"Million Clouds" (Piano Ver.)	Million Clouds	Keyboards
2016	Mone Kamishiraishi	"Woman (W no Higeki Yori)"	Chouchou	Arranger
2016	Mone Kamishiraishi	"Kawaranai Mono" (Studio Live)	Chouchou	Arranger
2016	Mone Kamishiraishi	"Nandemonaiya" (Movie Ver.)	Chouchou	Arranger, Keyboards
2016	Mika Nakashima	"Alone"	Songbook Amanojaku	Arranger, Keyboards
2016	Minami Kizuki	"Itsuka Hoshi ni Naru"	Gekkabijin	Arranger
2017	Unione	"Passabola!" (UNIONE Ver.)	Passabola!	Arranger, Strings, Brass, Keyboards
2017	Unione	"Regret"	Passabola!	Arranger, Strings, Brass, Keyboards
2017	Mika Nakashima	"Indigo"	Tough	Arranger, Keyboards
2017	Chay	"Anata ni Koi o Shite Mimashita" (Wedding Ver.)	chayTEA	Keyboards
2017	Mone Kamishiraishi	"The Voice of Hope"	And...	Composer, Arranger, Keyboards
2017	Leo Ieiri	"Zutto, Futari de"	Zutto, Futari de	Keyboards
2017	Kiyono Yasuno	"Chiisana Hitotsubu"	Namida.	Arranger
2017	Mika Nakashima	"Melody"	Roots ~Piano & Voice~	Arranger, Keyboards
2017	Mika Nakashima	"Inochi no Betsumei"	Roots ~Piano & Voice~	Arranger, Keyboards
2017	Mika Nakashima	"Maboroshi"	Roots ~Piano & Voice~	Arranger, Keyboards
2017	Mika Nakashima	"Say Yes"	Roots ~Piano & Voice~	Arranger, Keyboards
2017	Mika Nakashima	"Anata no Kiss o Kazoemashou ~You Were Mine~"	Roots ~Piano & Voice~	Arranger, Keyboards
2017	Mika Nakashima	"Hiro"	Roots ~Piano & Voice~	Arranger, Keyboards
2017	Mika Nakashima	"Sora mo Toberu Hazu"	Roots ~Piano & Voice~	Arranger, Keyboards
2017	Mika Nakashima	"Matsuri no Ato"	Roots ~Piano & Voice~	Arranger, Keyboards
2017	La La Larks	"Loop"	Culture Vulture	Strings
2017	La La Larks	"Tarinai"	Culture Vulture	Brass
2017	Masatoshi Nakamura	"Doko e Toki ga Nagaretemo"	Doko e Toki ga Nagaretemo	Keyboards
2017	Masatoshi Nakamura	"Mada Boku ni Dekiru Koto ga Aru Darou"	Doko e Toki ga Nagaretemo	Keyboards
2017	Momoka Ariyasu	"Chiisana Yuuki"	Kokoro no Oto	Arranger
2018	EVO+	"Methuselah"	Methuselah	Arranger
2018	Maaya Sakamoto	"Clear"	Clear	Keyboards
2018	Morning Musume 20th	"Tane wa Tsubasa" (Wings of the Seed)	Hatachi no Morning Musume	Programmer
2018	m-flo	"No Question"	The Tripod E.P.2	Strings
2018	m-flo	"Never"	The Tripod E.P.2	Strings
2018	Fumiya	"Sunny"	Sunny	Co-Arranger, Keyboards
2018	Minori Suzuki	"Crosswalk"	Crosswalk / Rewind	Strings
2018	Hiroko Yakushimaru	"Anata no Kotoba"	Etoile	Arranger, Keyboards
2018	Miki Miyamoto	"Shiawase no Tane" (Album Ver.)	Miki Made	Arranger, Keyboards
2018	Miki Miyamoto	"Weather Report"	Miki Made	Arranger, Keyboards
2018	Miki Miyamoto	"Nagai Ame"	Miki Made	Arranger, Keyboards
2018	Koyama-gumi	"Monseir"	Koyama-gumi	Arranger, Keyboards
2018	Koyama-gumi	"Gaienmae 1982"	Koyama-gumi	Arranger, Keyboards
2018	Koyama-gumi	"Watch Out!"	Koyama-gumi	Arranger, Keyboards
2018	Koyama-gumi	"Haru no Umi"	Koyama-gumi	Arranger, Keyboards
2018	Koyama-gumi	"Saiun"	Koyama-gumi	Composer, Arranger, Keyboards
2018	Toko Furuuchi	"Lost in the Wind"	After the Rain	Arranger, Keyboards
2018	Toko Furuuchi	"Just Because I Know"	After the Rain	Arranger, Keyboards
2018	Toko Furuuchi	"Kiriko"	After the Rain	Arranger, Keyboards
2018	Jun Shibata	"Hikaru Kumo"	Brynikle	Arranger, Keyboards
2018	Jun Shibata	"Ningen Replica"	Brynikle	Arranger, Keyboards
2018	Junna	"Contrast"	17-sai ga Utsukushii Nante, Dare ga Itta	Keyboards, Strings
2018	Mika Nakashima	"Amazing Grace"	Portrait ~Piano & Voice~	Arranger, Keyboards
2018	Mika Nakashima	"Hanataba"	Portrait ~Piano & Voice~	Arranger, Keyboards
2018	Mika Nakashima	"Yuki no Hana"	Portrait ~Piano & Voice~	Arranger, Keyboards
2018	Mika Nakashima	"Life"	Portrait ~Piano & Voice~	Arranger, Keyboards
2018	Mika Nakashima	"Portrait #1"	Portrait ~Piano & Voice~	Composer, Arranger, Keyboards
2018	Mika Nakashima	"Helpless Rain"	Portrait ~Piano & Voice~	Arranger, Keyboards
2018	Mika Nakashima	"Koe"	Portrait ~Piano & Voice~	Arranger, Keyboards
2018	Mika Nakashima	"Portrait #2"	Portrait ~Piano & Voice~	Composer, Arranger, Keyboards
2018	Mika Nakashima	"Resistance"	Portrait ~Piano & Voice~	Arranger, Keyboards
2018	Mika Nakashima	"Gift"	Portrait ~Piano & Voice~	Arranger, Keyboards
2018	Mika Nakashima	"Boku ga Shinou to Omotta no wa"	Portrait ~Piano & Voice~	Arranger, Keyboards
2018	Kiyono Yasuno	"Nageki no Sora"	Egao.	Arranger
2018	Minori Suzuki	"Kokoa ga, Aoi."	Miru Mae ni Tobe!	Keyboards
2019	Junna	"Tomodachi to Yoberu Shiawase"	Kono Yubi Tomare	Keyboards
2019	Nao Matsushita	"Guuzen to Tokubetsu"	Synchro	Arranger, Keyboards
2019	Nao Matsushita	"Anata to Turattatta♪" (Piano Solo Version)	Synchro	Co-Arranger
2019	W	"Harusaki Kobeni"	Choiaku Devil	Arranger
2021	Junko Ishihara	"Tada Soba ni Ite Kurete"	Tada Soba ni Ite Kurete	Keyboards
2021	Junko Ishihara	"Hitotsubu"	Tada Soba ni Ite Kurete	Keyboards
