= Single Collection+ Mitsubachi =

Compilation album by Maaya Sakamoto
- Released: November 14, 2012
- Genre: J-pop; anime song; pop rock
- Label: FlyingDog
- Producer: Mitsuyoshi Tamura; Maaya Sakamoto

Maaya Sakamoto chronology
Driving in the Silence (2011)	Single Collection+ Mitsubachi (2012)	Singer-Songwriter (2013)

Singles from Single Collection+ Mitsubachi
- 1. "Loop" Released: May 11, 2005; 2. "Kazemachi Jet” / “Spica" Released: June 14, 2006; 3. "Saigo no Kajitsu" Released: November 21, 2007; 4. "Triangler" Released: April 23, 2008; 5. "Ame ga Furu" Released: October 29, 2008; 6. "Magic Number" Released: November 11, 2009; 7. "Down Town" / "Yasashisa ni Tsutsumareta Nara" Released: October 20, 2010; 8. "Buddy" Released: October 19, 2011; 9. "Okaerinasai" Released: October 26, 2011; 10. "More Than Words" Released: July 25, 2012

Single Collection+ Mitsubachi (Japanese: シングルコレクション+ ミツバチ, Hepburn: Shinguru Korekushon Purasu Mitsubachi) is a compilation album by Japanese singer and voice actress Maaya Sakamoto, released on November 14, 2012, by FlyingDog.

It is the third installment in her single collection series, following Hotchpotch and Nikopachi, and marks her first compilation release in nine years. The album title "Mitsubachi" (meaning "bumblebee" in Japanese) ties into the accompanying nationwide tour of the same name, emphasizing themes of Sakamoto's musical journey through sound and visuals.

== Background and release ==
Maaya Sakamoto, known for her work as a voice actress as well as her singing career, announced the release of Single Collection + Mitsubachi as a retrospective of her singles from the mid-2000s onward. The years leading up to Mitsubachi were marked by significant activity in Sakamoto's career, including the release of her seventh album, You Can't Catch Me (2011), her third concept album, Driving in the Silence (2011), an extended tour, and a five-day concept live series in 2010–2011. Despite releasing only one single, "More Than Words," in 2012, Sakamoto maintained a rigorous schedule, including her role in the musical Daddy Long Legs in the fall of 2012.

Sakamoto described the period from 2005 as a transformative phase, marked by collaborations with various artists beyond her long-time producer Yoko Kanno. Prior to 2005, she rarely wrote her own lyrics, but since 2005 she began having on a more active role in lyric writing. She explained that writing her own lyrics allowed her to synchronize with the stories and worldviews of tie-in projects, such as anime, while incorporating directors' and authors' input. Over time, she developed a more relaxed approach to songwriting, learning to focus on key lines that reflected her identity while treating surrounding lyrics as "scenery" to enhance the song's core message. This shift required significant energy, feeling like a fresh start despite nearly a decade in the industry. Through trial and error, she gained confidence in her ability to adapt to any song, fostering a sense of trust in her unique voice. She noted a newfound flexibility in her approach, prioritizing key lyrical phrases that reflect her essence while treating surrounding lines as complementary "scenery", a creative freedom that made her process more relaxed and playful. Sakamoto described this as an "adventure period" following her close work with composer Yoko Kanno. This period involved experimenting with various artists, which she credits for her artistic growth, noting that the challenges faced during this time shaped her current vocal style and perspective.

The album compiles all of Sakamoto's singles from 2005 to 2012, starting with "Loop" (released May 11, 2005) and concluding with "More Than Words" (released July 25, 2012). Additionally, it includes a newly recorded version of "Kazemachi Jet", which Sakamoto decided to make to reflect her evolved performance style, particularly as the song became a staple in her live performances. Another previously limited-release song included on the record is "Action!", which was used as the opening theme for the anime project Clamp in Wonderland 2. As a bonus track, a new song provided by long-time collaborators Yoko Kanno and Yuho Iwasato entitled "Nekoze," was included as a bonus track. Sakamoto revealed that "Nekoze" was not originally intended for Mitsubachi but was inspired by Iwasato's reading of Sakamoto's travel essay from everywhere (2011). Upon reading the lyrics, Sakamoto told Iwasato that she hoped they could make something with this someday, and as Kanno happened to be there, she immediately composed a melody, and the song was born. Eventually, Sakamoto and Kanno recorded the song as a private gift for Iwasato, and Sakamoto subsequently decided to include it on the record due to its significance. Sakamoto reflected on the track's significance, noting, "The days since 'Loop' have been tumultuous for me... Having a song by Iwasato-san and Kanno-san at the end of this album summarizing those days feels deeply moving."

Sakamoto viewed Single Collection + Mitsubachi as a record of a transformative era in her career, during which she began to take greater control of her artistic direction. She described this period as one where she consciously chose challenging paths, leading to personal and professional growth. Reflecting on her mid-to-late 20s, Sakamoto noted the complexities and dilemmas faced during this time, particularly for women, but expressed a sense of liberation and boldness that emerged with experience, which is encapsulated in the album's themes and content.

The album was released in two formats: standard and limited edition' both pressed in high-quality SHM-CD format for enhanced audio fidelity. The limited edition of the album includes a Blu-ray disc compiling her music videos from the period, consisting of 11 music videos and a short film.

== Commercial performance ==
The album debuted at number 9 on the Oricon Weekly Albums Chart, with initial sales of 19,000 copies. The album ended up charting for 8 weeks, selling 29,000 copies in total.

== Track listing ==
No.	Title	Lyrics	Music	Arrangement	Length
1.	"Loop" (ループ)	H's	H-Wonder	H-Wonder	5:28
2.	"Magic Number" (マジックナンバー)	Maaya Sakamoto	Katsutoshi Kitagawa	Kitagawa	4:58
3.	"Down Town"	Ginji Ito	Tatsuro Yamashita	Takayuki Hattori	3:55
4.	"Triangler" (トライアングラー)	Gabriela Robin	Yoko Kanno	Kanno	4:39
5.	"Saigo no Kajitsu"	Sakamoto	Shōko Suzuki	Neko Saito	4:50
6.	"Spica" (スピカ)	Sakamoto	H-Wonder	H-Wonder	4:11
7.	"Action!"	Sakamoto	H-Wonder	H-Wonder	4:16
8.	"Yasashisa ni Tsutsumareta Nara" (やさしさに包まれたなら)	Yumi Matsutoya	Matsutoya	Depapepe	3:51
9.	"Ame ga Furu" (雨が降る)	Sakamoto	Kaori Kano	Saito	5:18
10.	"Buddy"	Sakamoto	Ryo Eguchi; School Food Punishment	Eguchi	4:00
11.	"Private Sky"	Sakamoto	Koichi Tabo	Taichi Nakamura	4:08
12.	"Kazemachi Jet" (風待ちジェット) (Mitsubachi Edition)	Sakamoto	Suzuki	Takahiro Iida	3:48
13.	"More Than Words" (モアザンワーズ)	Yuho Iwasato	Kanno	Kanno	3:48
14.	"Okaerinasai" (おかえりなさい)	Sakamoto	Matsutoya	Toshiyuki Mori	5:05
15.	"Praline" (プラリネ)	Sakamoto	Taiyo Yamazawa	Seiji Muto	5:09
16.	"April Fool" (エイプリルフール) (Tomita Lab feat. Maaya Sakamoto)	Jun Kamoda	Keiichi Tomita	Tomita	5:01
17.	"Nekoze" (猫背)	Iwasato	Kanno	Kanno	3:49

== Charts ==
Chart performance for Mitsubachi
Chart (2012)	Peak position
Japan (Oricon)	9
Japan Top Album Sales (Billboard Japan)	7
