= Okaerinasai (Maaya Sakamoto song) =

- Standard edition cover

Single by Maaya Sakamoto

from the album Single Collection+ Mitsubachi
- Language: Japanese
- B-side: "A Happy New Year"
- Released: October 26, 2011
- Studio: Victor Studio
- Genre: J-pop; anime song
- Length: 5:08
- Label: FlyingDog
- Composer: Yumi Matsutoya
- Lyricist: Maaya Sakamoto
- Producers: Mitsuyoshi Tamura; Maaya Sakamoto

Maaya Sakamoto singles chronology
| "Buddy" (2011) | "Okaerinasai" (2011) | "More Than Words" (2012) |

Music video
- "Okaerinasai" on YouTube

"Okaerinasai" (おかえりなさい; lit. 'Welcome Home') is a song by Japanese singer and voice actress Maaya Sakamoto, released as her twentieth single on October 26, 2011, by FlyingDog.

== Background and release ==
"Okaerinasai" was the second of three consecutive new works released by Sakamoto in 2025, following her single "Buddy". The song served as the opening theme for the television anime series Tamayura: Hitotose, and was commissioned following Sakamoto’s 2010 cover of Yumi Matsutoya's "Yasashisa ni Tsutsumareta Nara", which was previously used as theme song for the Tamayura OVA series.

Upon being approach by the production staff to handle the theme song for the TV adaptation of Tamayura, Sakamoto herself reached out to Yumi Matsutoya to request an original song. Regarding the creative process, Sakamoto commented: "Both the director’s vision and my own image aligned with "Yasashisa ni Tsutsumareta Nara" —a continuation of that world, with a nostalgic atmosphere. I envisioned a classic, traditional song. Yumi Matsutoya appeared to be the perfect fit, though I wondered if it was even possible [...] knowing she was on tour, I hesitated due to her busy schedule but took the plunge and asked. To my delight, she agreed!"

The idea of creating a song themed around the phrase "okaerinasai" ("welcome home") was a direct request from director Junichi Sato; when Sakamoto met with Matsutoya to explain what they had in mind, she promised she would write a melody where the phrase okaerinasai would stand out memorably. Upon listening to the demo provided by Matsutoya, which featured only piano, Sakamoto felt deeply moved as it "matched perfectly" what her idea of the song would be, to preserve that rustic warmth in the piano-only arrangement. Sakamoto expressed that she felt pressure of what it meant to provide lyrics to a Yumi Matsutoya composition, but once she envisioned what she wanted to express, "the words flowed without much hesitation." For inspiration, Sakamoto wove in the Tamayura protagonists and their own past student selves, avoiding excessive nostalgia, dwelling on themes such as the future once imagined may differ in shape, and while forgetting or failing to recall can bring sadness, "no matter what, this present moment is the best, a new world of your own."

For the b-side of the single, Sakamoto recorded "A Happy New Year," another cover of Matsutoya. Sakamoto commented that when recording this song, she wanted to maintain the original’s subtle vocal and sound atmosphere, offering a unique New Year’s ambiance distinct from typical seasonal songs.

The limited edition of "Okaerinasai" includes a live CD from Sakamoto's 2011 You Can't Catch Me tour, featuring 9 tracks (labeled as Part 2), complementing the 9 tracks (Part 1) included with the "Buddy" single, for a total of 18 songs of the complete concert set list.

== Commercial performance ==
"Okaerinasai" debuted and peaked at number 8 on the Oricon Weekly Singles Chart, selling 13,948 copies on its first week. The single charted for six weeks, with reported sales totaling 18,773 copies.

== Track listing ==
All music is composed by Yumi Matsutoya.

Okaerinasai - CD single
| No. | Title | Lyrics | Arrangement | Length |
|---|---|---|---|---|
| 1. | "Okaerinasai" | Maaya Sakamoto | Toshiyuki Mori | 5:08 |
| 2. | "A Happy New Year" | Yumi Matsutoya | Mina Kubota | 4:20 |
| 3. | "Okaerinasai" (Instrumental) | | | 5:08 |
| 4. | "A Happy New Year" (Instrumental) | | | 4:18 |
| Total length: | | | | 18:54 |

Live Tour 2011 "You Can't Catch Me" (Note: Audio recording of Sakamoto's concert held on June 3 and 4, 2011, at the Tokyo International Forum Hall A.) (part II) - limited edition bonus CD
| No. | Title | Length |
|---|---|---|
| 1. | "Peace" (ピース) | 4:54 |
| 2. | "Kazemachi Jet" (Kazeyomi Edition) (風待ちジェット〜kazeyomi edition) | 4:21 |
| 3. | "Get No Satisfaction!" | 4:29 |
| 4. | "Magic Number" (マジックナンバー) | 5:16 |
| 5. | "Hikari Are" (光あれ) | 4:33 |
| 6. | "Topia" (トピア) | 5:40 |
| 7. | "I and I" | 5:29 |
| 8. | "Stand Up, Girls!" | 4:31 |
| 9. | "Everywhere" | 6:02 |
| Total length: | | 45:15 |

== Personnel ==
Credits adapted from the liner notes of Okaerinasai.

- Mitsuyoshi Tamura – production
- Maaya Sakamoto – vocals, backing vocals, production
- Toshiyuki Mori – acoustic piano & programming
- Tatsuo Hayashi – drums
- Hideki Matsubara – bass
- Masayoshi Furukawa – guitars
- Motoya Hamaguchi – percussion
- Chieko Kinbara Strings – strings
- Nobumasa Yamada – recording & mixing engineering
- Takahiro Okubo – assisting engineering
- Hiroki Soshi – assisting engineering
- Hiroshi Kawasaki – mastering
- Masao Fukuda – A&R direction
- Hideki Kawaguchi – artist management
- Shirō Sasaki – executive production

== Charts ==
=== Weekly charts ===
Weekly chart performance for "Okaerinasai"
| Chart (2011) | Peak position |
|---|---|
| Japan (Oricon) | 8 |
| Japan Hot 100 (Billboard Japan) | 13 |
| Japan Top Singles Sales (Billboard Japan) | 7 |
| Japan Hot Animation (Billboard Japan) | 2 |

=== Monthly charts ===
Monthly chart performance for "Okaerinasai"
| Chart (2011) | Position |
|---|---|
| Japan (Oricon) | 34 |
