= Singer-Songwriter (album) =

- Regular edition cover

Studio album by Maaya Sakamoto
- Released: March 27, 2013
- Studio: Victor Studio; Tom-Tom Studio, Higashi; Prime Sound Studio Form; Aobadai Studio
- Genre: J-pop; Sunshine pop
- Length: 46:41
- Label: FlyingDog
- Producer: Maaya Sakamoto

Maaya Sakamoto chronology
Single Collection+ Mitsubachi (2012)	Singer-Songwriter (2013)	Follow Me Up (2015)

Singer-Songwriter (Japanese: シンガーソングライター, Hepburn: Shingā Songuraitā) is the eighth studio album by Japanese voice actress and singer Maaya Sakamoto, released on March 27, 2013, by FlyingDog. This marks her first album in over two years since her chart-topping album You Can't Catch Me, which became Sakamoto's first number one hit on the Oricon weekly charts. The album is notable for Sakamoto taking on the roles of lyricist, composer, and producer for all tracks, showcasing her talents as a singer-songwriter.

== Background and release ==
The concept for Singer-Songwriter emerged around the completion of Sakamoto's third concept album, Driving in the Silence. The idea to write and compose an entire album took shape approximately a year before its release, with Sakamoto beginning to stockpile songs in the summer of 2012. Despite her extensive experience as a lyricist, Sakamoto had only composed two songs prior to this album: "everywhere" (from her 15th-anniversary best-of album Everywhere) and "Chikai" (from Driving in the Silence). These earlier compositions were inspired by specific events, whereas Singer-Songwriter represents her exploration of creating music from everyday experiences.

Sakamoto set up a professional recording environment at home using a digital audio workstation, marking a shift from the simpler recording methods used for her previous compositions. She described the process as both daunting and exciting, driven by an intuitive "good feeling" rather than concrete expectations. The album was created without a predefined thematic concept, with Sakamoto focusing on completing each song individually, allowing the album's overarching world to form organically.

The album consists of ten tracks, including eight new songs, a remixed version of "Everywhere", and a rearranged version of "Chikai". Sakamoto wrote, composed, and produced all tracks, collaborating with arrangers Shin Kono and Yoshitaro Watanabe. She also handled chorus arrangements for select tracks, leveraging her voice as an instrument to create rhythmic and atmospheric elements, such as percussion-like or synth-pad-like effects.

Sakamoto's compositional approach emphasized unique transitions, particularly in the B-sections leading into choruses, which she described as acting like a "spring" to propel the song forward. Her melodies often leaned toward a guitar-driven sound, despite being composed on a keyboard, reflecting her desire to emulate the raw energy of guitar-based music. The album's lyrical content also marked a shift from her previous work, with Sakamoto noting that composing her own music reduced the need for lyrics to carry the full weight of expression. This allowed for more abstract and conceptual lyrics, reminiscent of her earlier work from her teenage years, with songs like "Ask." and "Boku no Hanbun" exploring introspective themes rather than straightforward love songs. "Tooku", which was selected as the opening track, was inspired by the imagery of a subway opening, capturing a sense of anticipation and excitement. "Sunshine" was built around layered vocal harmonies, emphasizing Sakamoto's approach to using her voice as an instrument. "Kaminari", on the other hand, is an experimental track inspired by a thunderstorm, featuring real thunder sounds recorded by Sakamoto at her home. It was conceived as a twin-vocal piece, reflecting a dialogue between two aspects of herself. Lastly, the album's title track "Singer-Songwriter" encapsulates Sakamoto's joy in creating music and her belief that everyone's life inherently carries a musical rhythm. She commented it was one of her favorite tracks on the album, reflecting her 18-year career and the universal nature of music.

The album was released in two formats: a standard edition and a limited edition that includes a DVD. The DVD features the music video for the lead track "Nicola" and an in-depth documentary showcasing Sakamoto's songwriting and recording process.

== Critical reception ==
A review by music magazine CD Journal praised the album's stripped-down approach, noting that it is her most straightforward work in recent years, allowing listeners to fully appreciate the transparent and refined charm of her vocals. The arrangements by Shin Kono and Zentaro Watanabe were described as sophisticated and tasteful, contributing to a clear and airy soundscape that enhances the album's overall impact.

== Commercial performance ==
The album debuted at number 6 on the Oricon Weekly Albums Chart, with initial sales of 18,000 copies. The album ended up charting for 5 weeks, selling 22,000 copies in total.

== Track listing ==
All tracks are written by Maaya Sakamoto.

No.	Title	Arrangement	Length
1.	"Tōku" (遠く, lit. 'Far Away')	Shin Kono	4:42
2.	"Sunshine" (サンシャイン)	Zentaro Watanabe	4:13
3.	"Everywhere" (HAL (Note: Refers to HAL Studio.) Mix)	Kono	5:31
4.	"Nicola" (ニコラ)	Watanabe	3:54
5.	"Ask."	Watanabe	3:42
6.	"Naritai" (なりたい, lit. 'Want to Be')	Watanabe	3:54
7.	"Kaminari" (カミナリ, lit. 'Thunder')	Kono	3:21
8.	"Chikai" (誓い, lit. 'Oath') (SSW Edition)	Kono	3:51
9.	"Boku no Hanbun" (僕の半分, lit. 'Half of Me')	Watanabe	6:32
10.	"Singer-Songwriter" (シンガーソングライター)	Kono	5:50
Total length:			46:41

== Charts ==
Chart performance for Singer-Songwriter
Chart (2013)	Peak position
Japan (Oricon)	6
Japan Top Album Sales (Billboard Japan)	4

== Personnel ==
Credits adapted from the liner notes of Singer-Songwriter.

- Maaya Sakamoto – vocals, backing vocals, songwriting, production, chorus arrangements (1–2, 4–7, 9–10), main handclaps (4, 10), finger snaps (10)
- Shin Kono – arrangements, sound production (1, 3, 7, 8, 10), piano (3, 10), electric piano [Wurlitzer] (1), electric piano [Rhodes] (8), glockenspiel (10), acoustic guitar (1), programming (1, 8, 10), chorus arrangements (1, 10)
- Zentaro Watanabe – arrangements, sound production (2, 4–6, 9), mixing (2, 4–6, 9), recording (2, 4–6, 9), programming (2, 4–6, 9), chorus arrangements (4, 6, 9), guitar (2, 6), bass (2, 4, 5), glockenspiel (2), tambourine (2),
- Tomohiko Ōkanda – bass (1, 3, 8, 10)
- Yasuo Sano – drums (1, 3, 9)
- Tsuneo Imahori – guitar (1)
- Takuo Yamamoto – tenor saxophone (1, 10), baritone saxophone (1), flute (10)
- Yōichi Murata – trombone (1)
- Kōji Nishimura – trumpet (1, 10)
- Yoshitomo Kuramura – drums (2, 6)
- Masato Ishinari – guitar (3, 7, 8)
- Chieko Kinbara Strings – strings (3, 5, 7, 8, 10)
- Kōichirō Tashiro – banjo, bouzouki (4)
- Yoshihiro Kawamura – drums (4)
- Yoshiaki Dewa – electric guitar (4, 9)
- Daisuke Suzuki – bass (6)
- Sae Konno – piano (6)
- Makoto Ideshita – guitar solo (6)
- Nobuo Eguchi – drums (8)
- Ryūji Yamamoto – electric piano [Rhodes] (9)
- Kei Takasō – bass (9)
- Masahiro Itami – guitar (10)
- Hideki Kawaguchi – handclaps (10)
- Masao Fukuda – handclaps, finger snaps (10)
- Eijirō Nakagawa – trombone solo (10)
- Yūzō Kataoka – trombone (10)
- Toshihiko Miyoshi – mixing (1, 3, 7, 8, 10)
- Hiroaki Yamazaki – recording (1, 7, 8, 10)
- Shunsuke Tanaka – recording (2, 4–6, 9)
- Yūta Ōtake – recording (2)
- Hirokazu Fukushima – recording (3)
- Yōsuke Watanabe – assistant engineer (1–2, 5–10)
- Ryō Kanai – assistant engineer (1–2, 5–8)
- Kazuya Yoshida – assistant engineer (2, 4–6)
- Toshiyuki Kawato – assistant engineer (4, 6)
- Ryū Watabe – assistant engineer (7)
- Rie Mimoto – assistant engineer (8)
- Kenichi Koga – assistant engineer (9)
- Hiroshi Kawasaki – mastering
- Masao Fukuda – direction, A&R
- Mieko Takeuchi – A&R desk
- Kanako Kajiyama – A&R desk
- Shirō Sasaki – executive producer
- Hideki Kawaguchi – artist management
- Fumio Miyata – musician coordination
