= Buddy (Maaya Sakamoto song) =

- Limited edition cover

Single by Maaya Sakamoto

from the album Single Collection+ Mitsubachi
- Language: Japanese
- B-side: "Something Little"
- Released: October 9, 2011
- Studio: Victor Studio
- Genre: J-pop; Pop rock; Anime song
- Length: 4:03
- Label: FlyingDog
- Composers: School Food Punishment; Ryo Eguchi
- Lyricist: Maaya Sakamoto
- Producers: Mitsuyoshi Tamura; Maaya Sakamoto

Maaya Sakamoto singles chronology
"Down Town / Yasashisa ni Tsutsumareta Nara" (2010)	"Buddy" (2011)	"Okaerinasai" (2011)

Music video
- "Buddy" on YouTube

"Buddy" is a song by Japanese singer and voice actress Maaya Sakamoto, released as her nineteenth single on October 9, 2011, by FlyingDog. Co-written by Sakamoto with School Food Punishment and Ryō Eguchi, the song served as opening theme for the television anime series Last Exile: Fam of the Silver Wing, which began broadcasting in October 2011.

== Background and release ==
"Buddy" is a collaboration between Sakamoto and the band School Food Punishment (SFP), marking their first time providing a song to another artist. Sakamoto specifically asked for the band's involvement, and asked them to create a track in their signature style rather than adapting to hers. She commented: "I have always been a fan of School Food Punishment myself, so I reached out to them, and they gladly accepted. Even though they were providing the song, I thought it would be better for them to collaborate in their usual musical world rather than tailoring it to me —so that's exactly what I requested."

During recording, School Food Punishment handled the instrumentation, with vocalist Yumi Uchimura providing backing vocals. Sakamoto described the melody as "tricky" and engaging to sing. The track features complex string arrangements by Eguchi, enhancing its speed and cool factor, diverging from Sakamoto's typical string-heavy songs. Regarding the song's recording, Sakamoto commented: "I have always worked solo, so I was really curious about what it would feel like. Watching them, I could sense more than I imagined the atmosphere of a band that's been together for so long. They were there with me even during the orchestral recording. For me personally, I slipped into the recording with School Food Punishment so naturally—it was almost mysterious. It didn't feel like I was just visiting as an outsider; the fit was better than I expected, so I could sing just as I always do."

The single's b-side, "Something Little," was composed by Ryo Tsukamoto, known for his works for Youmou & Ohana. The result from a request by Sakamoto for a slow, acoustic piece inspired by said group, the track was arranged by Ryūji Yamamoto (known for his work with Yuko Ando) into a 1960s–70s soft rock style. Sakamoto sought an arrangement that felt relaxed, not overly stiff or pushy, but with "exquisite balance" to contrast the A-side. The result surprised Tsukamoto and was described by Sakamoto as an ideal "B-side" track, providing strong contrast to the title song.

The single release was officially announced on August 19, 2011, as one of the three consecutive new works to be released from October 19 through November 11 that year, following the fifteenth anniversary of Sakamoto's debut (the other two releases being the "Okaerinasai" single, and the then-untitled concept album Driving in the Silence). The limited editions of both singles included a live CD from Sakamoto's 2011 You Can't Catch Me tour, with nine tracks (labeled Part 1) for "Buddy" and nine tracks (labeled Part 2) for "Okaerinasai", totaling 18 songs.

The photoshoot for the single's artwork was taken in Ireland.

== Composition and themes ==
The song's lyrics were written by Sakamoto, with music composed by School Food Punishment and Ryo Eguchi of Stereo Fabrication of Youth. The song was described on Sakamoto's official website as an "up-tempo number," featuring vivid, multicolored sounds swirling in a "thrilling and aggressive frenzy," enhanced by Eguchi's complex string arrangements that amplify its speed and "cool factor." Sakamoto wrote the lyrics after reading the entire script of Last Exile: Fam of the Silver Wing, taking inspiration from the story. She explained this further, by commenting: "The protagonists are pilots who team up as buddies in pairs [...] so this time, I wrote from the perspective of the 'buddy' supporting from behind. Up until now, I have often been supported by others as I pushed toward my goals, so writing from the viewpoint of watching and supporting someone else felt really fresh for me." Sakamoto further explained her inspiration from the anime series by commenting: "The story and characters pulled me along so much and gave me a brand-new spark. There are so many things I love about it, but from the start, the words "unexplored territory" became a key phrase for me. It pushed me to write a song about the resolve to challenge the unknown." She also decided to include the phrase "I will become your wings" (kimi no tsubasa ni naru) which is an actual dialogue from the script, and could be interpreted as from the point of view of the series protagonist, Fam, or from or the character of Giselle, as Fam's "buddy," but Sakamoto expressed she expected listeners to interpret it in various ways.

== Commercial performance ==
"Buddy" debuted and peaked at number 10 on the Oricon Weekly Singles Chart, selling 12,895 copies on its first week. The single charted for eleven weeks, with reported sales totaling 22,740 copies.

== Track listing ==
All lyrics are written by Maaya Sakamoto.

Buddy - CD single
No.	Title	Music	Arrangement	Length
1.	"Buddy"	School Food Punishment; Ryo Eguchi	Ryo Eguchi	4:03
2.	"Something Little"	Ryō Tsukamoto	Ryūji Yamamoto	5:12
3.	"Buddy" (Instrumental)			4:02
4.	"Something Little" (Instrumental)			5:08
Total length:				18:27

Live Tour 2011 "You Can't Catch Me" (Note: Audio recording of Sakamoto's concert held on June 3 and 4, 2011, at the Tokyo International Forum Hall A.) (part I) - limited edition bonus CD
No.	Title	Length
1.	"Eternal Return"	4:29
2.	"Himitsu" (秘密)	4:39
3.	"Down Town"	4:18
4.	"Spica" (スピカ)	4:21
5.	"Mizuumi" (みずうみ)	6:21
6.	"Bokura no Rekishi" (ボクらの歴史)	4:10
7.	"Kimi no Sei" (キミノセイ)	5:49
8.	"Kanashikute Yarikirenai" (悲しくてやりきれない)	4:28
9.	"Moonlight (Mata wa "Kimi ni Nemuru Tame no Ongaku")" (ムーンライト (または"きみが眠るための音楽")	4:55
Total length:		44:01

== Charts ==
=== Weekly charts ===
Weekly chart performance for "Buddy"
Chart (2011)	Peak position
Japan (Oricon)	10
Japan Hot 100 (Billboard Japan)	18
Japan Top Singles Sales (Billboard Japan)	8
Japan Hot Animation (Billboard Japan)	3

=== Monthly charts ===
Monthly chart performance for "Buddy"
Chart (2011)	Position
Japan (Oricon)	30

== Personnel ==
Credits adapted from the liner notes of Buddy.

- Mitsuyoshi Tamura – production
- Maaya Sakamoto – vocals, backing vocals, production
- Yumi Uchimura – backing vocals
- Masayuki Hasuo – synthesizer
- Hideaki Yamasaki – bass
- Osamu Hidai – drums
- Ryo Eguchi – arrangements, string arrangements, all other instruments
- Nagisa Kiriyama Strings – strings
- Hiroaki Okuda – recording & mixing engineering
- Takahiro Okubo – assisting engineering
- Hiroki Soshi – assisting engineering
- Hiroshi Kawasaki – mastering
- Masao Fukuda – A&R direction
- Hideki Kawaguchi – artist management
- Shirō Sasaki – executive production
