= More Than Words (Maaya Sakamoto song) =

- Standard edition cover

Single by Maaya Sakamoto

from the album Single Collection+ Mitsubachi
- Language: Japanese
- B-side: "Dekoboko March (Tairetsu wa Kimi ni Tsuzuku)"
- Released: July 25, 2012
- Studio: MIT Studio; Victor Studio
- Genre: J-pop; Anime song
- Length: 5:08
- Label: FlyingDog
- Composer: Yoko Kanno
- Lyricist: Yuho Iwasato
- Producer: Yoko Kanno

Maaya Sakamoto singles chronology
"Okaerinasai" (2011)	"More Than Words" (2012)	"Hajimari no Umi" (2012)

Music video
- "More Than Words" on YouTube

"More Than Words" (Japanese: モアザンワーズ, Hepburn: Moa Zan Wāzu) is a song by Japanese singer and voice actress Maaya Sakamoto, released as her twenty-first single on July 25, 2012, by FlyingDog.

== Background and release ==
The song was first announced in early May 2012, as it was selected to be the as the theme song for the OVA Code Geass: Akito the Exiled, which premiered in theaters on August 4, 2012. The production team marks a reunion of the collaborators who worked together on Sakamoto's debut single "Yakusoku wa Iranai" (1996) for the anime The Vision of Escaflowne, which launched Sakamoto's singing career. This also marked the first time in nine years that Kanno and Iwasato worked together on a single for Sakamoto, since the 2003 single "Tune the Rainbow."

The song was specifically requested by Code Geass director Kazuki Akane, who was also the director of The Vision of Escaflowne. According to Sakamoto, the track was developed by entrusting Kanno with her creative vision for the music and Iwasato with a long-held lyrical theme centered on "freedom" and "growth," tailored to Sakamoto's personal journey from child actress to adult artist. Sakamoto described it as song with a "a heavy, melancholic atmosphere filled with sorrow", and praised the track's "genre-defying, mysterious feel," stating it did not resemble any of her previous works.

The phrase "Isn't freedom a little heart-wrenching?" (Jiyū tte Setsunakunai desu ka?) that appears in the lyrics originated from a private conversation between Sakamoto and Iwasato several years earlier, which Iwasato had kept in stock until the day she could have Sakamoto sing it. Whereas previously Iwasato had created lyrics to fit the melody, for this work she was requested to write freely without being constrained by the melody and to include more lyrics than usual. As a result, Sakamoto, Kanno, and Iwasato worked together as a trio to brainstorm phrases.

The single's b-side "Dekoboko March (Tairetsu wa Kimi ni Tsuzuku)" (lit. 'Uneven March (The Formation Follows You)') was also composed, arranged and produced by Kanno, with lyrics written by Sakamoto.

== Critical reception ==
Tetsuo Hiraga of Billboard JAPAN and HotShotDiscs described it as "pop music as a work of art that makes you realize that you are alive by facing reality instead of lining up easy-to-understand positive words."

== Commercial performance ==
"More Than Words" debuted and peaked at number 16 on the Oricon Weekly Singles Chart, selling 10,722 copies on its first week. The single charted for six weeks, with reported sales totaling 16,091 copies.

== Track listing ==
All music is composed by Yoko Kanno.

More Than Words - CD single
No.	Title	Lyrics	Length
1.	"More Than Words" (モアザンワーズ)	Yuho Iwasato	5:08
2.	"Dekoboko March (Tairetsu wa Kimi ni Tsuzuku)" (デコボコマーチ (隊列は君に続く)	Maaya Sakamoto	5:00
3.	"Kinobori to Akai Skirt" (live version (Note: Live recording from Sakamoto's concert Live 2011 In The Silence held on November 17, 2011, at the Galaxy Theatre in Tennozu, Tokyo.)) (secret track)

== Personnel ==
Credits adapted from the liner notes of More Than Words.

- Yoko Kanno – production, keyboards
- Maaya Sakamoto – vocals, backing vocals
- Yasuo Sano – drums
- Susumu Nishikawa – guitar
- Keishi Urata – programming
- Shunsuke Sakamoto – programming
- Masahiko Todo Strings – strings
- Sousuke Tsujinaka – recording & mixing engineering
- Kohei Nakaya – recording & mixing engineering
- Toshiyuki Kawahito – recording & mixing engineering
- Takahiro Okubo – assisting engineering
- Hiroki Soshi – assisting engineering
- Hiroshi Kawasaki – mastering
- Masao Fukuda – A&R direction
- Hideki Kawaguchi – artist management
- Shirō Sasaki – executive production

== Charts ==
=== Weekly charts ===
Weekly chart performance for "More Than Words"
Chart (2012)	Peak position
Japan (Oricon)	16
Japan Hot 100 (Billboard Japan)	25
Japan Top Singles Sales (Billboard Japan)	14
Japan Hot Animation (Billboard Japan)	3

=== Monthly charts ===
Monthly chart performance for "More Than Words"
Chart (2012)	Position
Japan (Oricon)	48
