= Michiyo Heike =

Japanese pop singer-songwriter (born 1979)

Michiyo Heike 平家みちよ
- Also known as: Michiyo
- Born: Michiyo Heike (平家充代); April 6, 1979 (age 47)
- Origin: Osaka Prefecture, Japan
- Genres: Japanese pop
- Occupation: Singer-songwriter
- Years active: 1997 – 2021
- Label: Warner Music Japan
- Website: www.michiyo34.com/ent.htm

Michiyo Heike (平家みちよ, Heike Michiyo; born April 6, 1979) is a former Japanese pop singer-songwriter from Osaka Prefecture and raised in Nabari, Mie. She first become known after her appearance on the Japanese talent show Asayan in the late 1990s, becoming the first member of the future "Hello! Project". Heike currently goes by the simply Michiyo.

== History ==
=== Pre-debut ===
Heike applied for the Asayan Sharam Q-Produced Female Rock Vocalist Audition (ASAYAN シャ乱Qブロデュース 女性ロックヴォーカリスト オーディション, Asayan sharan kyū purodūsu josei rokku vōkarisuto ōdishon) while a junior at Mie Prefectural Nabari Nishi Senior High School. The program, the winner of which would go on to be produced by famous rock band Sharam Q, was held from April through August 1997, on the TV Tokyo network. Out of around 9,900 applicants, Sharam Q chose Heike as the winner. Prior to her debut, Heike secluded herself from the media to train under the direction of Sharam Q vocalist Tsunku. During this two-month training time, Tsunku gave five of the audition runners-ups a chance to form a girl group, which he named Morning Musume. Eventually Tsunku focused on producing this group, and Sharam Q guitarist Hatake took over producing Heike. Her stage name was determined as Michyo Heike (平家みちよ) changing the Kanji characters for her first name into hiragana.

=== 1997: Debut and "Get" ===
Heike's debut single "Get", composed by Hatake, with lyrics by Tsunku, was released from the WEA Japan label on November 5, 1997. "Get" was her highest-charting single, peaking at number 24 on the Oricon Singles Chart, charting for six weeks. On November 6, her first live performance was held at the Nippon Budokan Hall in front of an audience of ten thousand invited by Asayan. Michiyo Heike and Morning Musume shared a joint fan club, known as "Hello!", later to become known as "Hello! Project". During this time, Heike was the only soloist.

=== 1998: "Sotsugyō —Top of the World—", "Daikirai", Morning Cop "Daite Hold on Me!", and "Dakedo aishi sugite" ===
In February 1998, she released her 2nd single, "Sotsugyō —Top of the World—", a cover song for The Carpenters' Top of the World. The lyrics of the song were written by Makoto of Sharam Q, and it peaked at number 35 on the Oricon Singles Chart. Michiyo released her first studio album Teenage Dream on March 25, 1998, peaking at number 50 on the Oricon Albums Chart. "Daikirai" was released for Michiyo's third single on July 1, 1998. The song was again composed by Hatake, peaking at number 50 on the Oricon Singles Chart. Morning Cop "Daite Hold on Me!" OST was released on September 30, 1998, under the names of Michiyo Heike and Morning Musume, peaking at number 18 on the Oricon Albums Chart. "Dakedo Aishisugite" was Heike's fourth single, released on October 25, 1998, as part the joint OST album Morning Cop "Daite Hold on Me!" It peaked at number 95 on the Oricon Singles Chart.

=== 1999: "Anata no yume ni naritai" and "Scene" ===
Heike's 5th single "Anata no yume ni naritai" was released on February 10, 1999, peaking at number 70 on the Oricon Singles Chart. She released her 6th single "Scene" on July 28, 1999. The song was again composed by Hatake, with lyrics by Michiyo herself, peaking at number 79 on the Oricon Singles Chart.

=== 2000: "One-room natsu no koi monogatari", For Ourself, and "Ai no chikara" ===
Michiyo released her 7th single "One-room natsu no koi monogatari" on May 17, 2000. The song was her first song produced by Tsunku, peaking at number 26 on the Oricon Singles Chart. "Ai no chikara" was her 8th single released on August 9, 2000. The song was again produced by Tsunku, peaking at number 38 on the Oricon Singles Chart. Heike released her 2nd studio album For Ourself —Single History— on September 13, 2000, peaking at number 23 on the Oricon Singles Chart. In 2000, Heike participated in shuffle unit Kiiro 5.

=== 2001: "Kekkyoku Bye Bye Bye" and "Propose" ===
Heike released her 9th single "Kekkyoku Bye Bye Bye" on February 7, 2001, peaking at number 45 on the Oricon Singles Chart. She then signed a new recording contract with zetima label after her recording contract with WEA Japan ended. Her 10th single "Propose" was released on November 7, 2001, peaking at number 31 on the Oricon Singles Chart. In 2001, she was part of 7-nin Matsuri.

=== 2002: "Murasaki shikibu" ===
"Murasaki shikibu", released on June 5, 2001, was her last single as a Hello! Project member, peaking at number 39 on the Oricon Singles Chart. In July 2002, she was a member of Sexy 8. Since Heike's management contract with Up Front Group ended and was not renewed, she "graduated" from Hello! Project in November 2002, five years after her debut.

=== 2004–2021 ===
In 2004, she changed her stage name to Michiyo (みちよ) and began a career as an indies songwriter. Her first indie album, titled Jecica, was entirely self-written and was released on March 3, 2004.

In 2020, she release her digital single “Luminous”

In 2021, she retired and decided to embark on a new path.

== Discography ==
=== Singles ===
==== As Michiyo Heike ====
#	Title	Japanese Translation	Release date	Oricon ranking
1	"Get"	"GET"	November 5, 1997	24
2	"Sotsugyō —Top of the World—"	卒業 〜TOP OF THE WORLD〜 "Graduation (Top of the World)"	February 15, 1998	35
3	"Daikirai"	ダイキライ "(large amount of) Hate"	July 1, 1998	50
4	"Dakedo aishi sugite"	だけど 愛しすぎて "But I Loved You Too Much"	October 25, 1998	95
5	"Anata no yume ni naritai"	アナタの夢になりたい "I Want to Be Your Dream"	February 10, 1999	70
6	"Scene"	"scene"	July 28, 1999	79
7	"One-room natsu no koi monogatari"	ワンルーム夏の恋物語 "One-Room Summer Love Story"	May 17, 2000	26
8	"Ai no chikara"	愛の力 "Power of Love"	August 9, 2000	38
9	"Kekkyoku Bye Bye Bye"	結局 Bye Bye Bye "After Everything, Bye Bye Bye"	February 7, 2001	45
10	"Propose"	プロポーズ	November 7, 2001	31
11	"Murasaki shikibu"	ムラサキシキブ "Purple shikibu"	June 5, 2002	39

==== As Michiyo ====
#	Title	Japanese Translation	Release date
1	"Ran Run Ran" (Fan club release)	嵐・RUN・乱 (Read "Ran Ran Ran")	—
2	Unaffected	—	December 9, 2005

=== Albums ===
==== As Michiyo Heike ====
#	Title	Japanese Translation	Release date	Oricon ranking
1	Teenage Dream	—	March 25, 1998	50
2	For Ourself —Single History—	For ourself 〜Single History〜	September 13, 2000	23
3	Morning Cop "Daite Hold on Me!" OST; With Morning Musume	モーニング刑事。抱いてHOLD ON ME!	September 30, 1998	18

==== As Michiyo ====
#	Title	Japanese Translation	Release date
1	Jecica	—	March 3, 2004
2	Koimizuki	恋水姫; Loving Ice Princess	February 28, 2005
3	Fantasia	—	July 25, 2006

==== DVD ====
Title	Date
"Sweets of Jecica"	September 30, 2004

== Performances ==
=== Radio ===
Title	Station	Date
Sound Planet サウンドプラネット	Radio Berry (FM Tochigi)	April 3, 1998 – September 27, 2002, December 3, 2008
Michiyo Heike Teenage Beat!	Radio Cube (FM Mie)	October 4, 1998 – March 28, 1999
Michiyo Heike Weekend Rendezvous 平家みちよ ウィークエンドランデヴー	Radio Cube (FM Mie)	April 3, 1999 – September 30, 2001
Michiyo Heike no Dochira Made 平家みちよのどちらまで	JOQR-AM	January 2001 – March 2002
Hecchara Heike – Yoroshiku Yossie ヘッチャラ平家★よろしくヨッスィー	CBC Radio	October 6, 2001 – October 5, 2002
Young Town Music Max ヤンタンMUSIC MAX	MBS Radio	—

=== Films ===
Title	Release Date
Morning Cop "Daite Hold on Me!" モーニング刑事。抱いてHOLD ON ME!	1998

=== Musicals ===
Title	Date
Love Century (Yume wa Minakerya Hajimaranai); LOVEセンチュリー -夢はみなけりゃ始まらない-	May 3–27, 2001

=== Concert tours ===
Title	Date
Michiyo Heike/Morning Musume First Concert "Hello!" 平家みちよ・モーニング娘。ファーストコンサート「HELLO!」	July 12–27, 1998
Morning Musume/Michiyo Heike "Morning Cop Daite Hold on Me!" screening/photo session/mini live/handshake event tour モーニング娘。・平家みちよ「モーニング刑事。抱いて HOLD ON ME!」映画上映・撮影会・ミニライブ・握手会ツアー	August – November 1998
Morning Musume/Michiyo Heike school festival "Morning Cop Daite Hold on Me!" screening/mini live モーニング娘。・平家みちよ学園祭「モーニング刑事。抱いて HOLD ON ME!」映画上映・ミニライブ	October – November 1998
Michiyo Heike "Sotsugyō Memorial Live" 平家みちよ「卒業メモリアルライブ」	November 1–11, 2004
Jecica Release Event/Azumazaka Tour '04 「JECICA発売記念・東阪ツアー'04」	April 6–11, 2004
Koimizuki Release Even/Azamazaka Tour '05 「恋水姫発売記念・東阪ツアー'05」	March 26 – April 2, 2005
Michiyo Tour 2005 "Unaffected" みちよ Tour 2005 『unaffected』	November 14–30, 2005
