= Fonogenico =

Japanese band

Fonogenico (フォノジェニコ) is a Japanese band. They are well known for their ballad and jazz songs and signed under BMG Japan. They debuted in May 2006 with their first single "Reason", which was featured as the first ending theme of the anime series xxxHOLiC. They also performed the theme song for the Japanese drama series Hyakki Yakoushou. They have not been active since the end of 2010.

== Members ==
- 高山奈帆子 (Naoko Takayama) (born December 17 in Wakayama Prefecture) - vocals, lyrics (2003–present)
- 川口潤 (Masaru Kawaguchi) (born January 10 in Osaka Prefecture) - piano, keyboards, composition (2003–2008)

== Discography ==
=== Singles ===
Reason (released May 31, 2006)

1. Reason
2. lovers
3. ノーサイド (No Side)

リズム (released July 19, 2006)

1. リズム (Rhythm)
2. Shalala
3. One Day Afternoon <party version>

オレンジの砂 (released May 23, 2007)

1. オレンジの砂 (Orange no Suna; Orange Sand)
2. オーロラパーティー (Aurora Party)
3. 6月の絵画 (Rokugatsu no Kaiga; June Picture)

君がいない / 雨粒 (released December 1, 2007)

1. 君がいない (Kimi ga Inai; You're Not Here)
2. 雨粒 (Ametsubu; Raindrop)
3. 水玉ダイアリー (Mizutama Diary; Polka Dot Diary)
4. Happy Merry Christmas

=== Mini-Albums ===
ねがいごと (released February 7, 2007)

1. Reason
2. ねがいごと (Negaigoto; Wish)
3. 遠い街 (Tooi Machi; Distant Road)
4. lovers
5. Free
6. Shalala
