= Suneohair =

Suneohair スネオヘアー
- Also known as: Suneohair
- Born: Kenji Watanabe 渡辺健二; May 6, 1971 (age 54)
- Origin: Nagaoka, Niigata Prefecture, Japan
- Genres: Indie rock
- Occupations: Singer, song-writer, music producer
- Years active: 1998 – Present
- Labels: Cafe au Label (1998 – 2002); Sony Epic Records (2002 – 2010); Starchild (2010 – present)
- Website: Suneohair's Official Website

Suneohair (スネオヘアー, Suneoheā) is the performing name of Kenji Watanabe. He is best known in the West for his contributions to the soundtrack of the anime adaptation of Honey & Clover and Honey and Clover II, for which he provided the ending themes "Waltz" (ワルツ) and "Split" (スプリット). He has also provided the ending themes for Arakawa Under the Bridge and Arakawa Under the Bridge x Bridge, namely "Sakasama Bridge" (逆様ブリッジ) and "Akai Coat" (赤いコート) respectively. More recently, he provided the ending theme to the Anime Sukitte Ii na yo, "Slow Dance".

== Discography ==
=== Independent albums ===
==== Studio albums ====
| Year | Album title | Chart Position | Certifications |
| Year | Album title | JP | JP |
|---|---|---|---|
| 1999 | SUN!NEO!AIR!: Released: February 17, 1999; Label: Cafe au Label | – | – |

==== Tundra ====
| Year | Album title | Chart Position | Certifications |
| Year | Album title | JP | JP |
|---|---|---|---|
| 2015 | Tundra: Released: June 22, 2015; Label: Tundra | – | – |
| 2017 | kiss me quickly: Released: June 14, 2017; Label: Tundra | – | – |
| 2018 | ALL SINGLES BEST -LIVE 2018–: Released: December 26, 2018; Label: Tundra | – | – |
| 2020 | Suneohair_demotracks_tundra 2020 (Demo): Released: 2020; Label: Tundra | – | – |

==== Mini-albums ====
| Year | Album title | Chart Position | Certifications |
| Year | Album title | JP | JP |
|---|---|---|---|
| 1999 | Natsu Yori: Released: July 27, 1999; Label: Cafe au Label | – | – |
| 1999 | No Pants Life: Released: November 19, 1999; Label: Cafe au Label | – | – |
| 2000 | Fuyu No Tsubasa: Released: February 22, 2000; Label: Cafe au Label | – | – |

=== Major label albums ===
==== Studio albums ====
| Year | Album title | Chart Position | Certifications |
| Year | Album title | JP | JP |
|---|---|---|---|
| 2002 | Sunestyle: Released: October 9, 2002; Label: Sony Epic Records | 46 | – |
| 2003 | a watercolor: Released: July 24, 2003; Label: Sony Epic Records | 25 | – |
| 2004 | Fork: Released: December 15, 2004; Label: Sony Epic Records | 23 | – |
| 2005 | Kanashimi: Released: December 7, 2005; Label: Sony Epic Records | 16 | – |
| 2007 | Skirt: Released: February 21, 2007; Label: Sony Epic Records | 26 | – |
| 2008 | Birthday: Released: November 12, 2008; Label: Sony Epic Records | 28 | – |
| 2011 | Suneohair: Released: August 24, 2011; Label: Starchild | 63 | – |
| 2013 | 8 Eight: Released: May 22, 2013; Label: Starchild | 69 | – |
| 2016 | 0 Zero: Released: May 25, 2016; Label: Starchild | 90 | – |

==== Mini-albums ====
| Year | Album title | Chart Position | Certifications |
| Year | Album title | JP | JP |
|---|---|---|---|
| 2003 | Tokyo Bivouac: Released: November 19, 2003; Label: Sony Epic Records | 40 | – |
| 2010 | Sakasama Bridge: Released: June 23, 2010; Label: Starchild | 44 | – |
| 2010 | Akai Coat: Released: December 8, 2010; Label: Starchild | 68 | – |

=== Compilation albums ===
2009 – BEST

=== Singles ===
| Year | Single | Chart Position | Certifications | Album |
| Year | Single | JP | JP | Album |
|---|---|---|---|---|
| 2001 | "Filter / Genzai Ichi" | – | – | |
| 2001 | "Kou Shite Wa Irarenai" | – | – | |
| 2002 | "Ivory" | – | – | Sunestyle |
| 2002 | "Wake Mo Shiranaide" | – | – | Sunestyle |
| 2003 | "Over The River" | 170 | – | Sunestyle |
| 2003 | "Uguisu" | 82 | – | a watercolor |
| 2003 | "Seikou Toutei" | 78 | – | a watercolor |
| 2004 | "Hikou" | 45 | – | Fork |
| 2004 | "Strike" | 35 | – | Fork |
| 2004 | "Tenohira" | 131 | – | Fork |
| 2005 | "Waltz" | 20 | – | Kanashimi |
| 2005 | "Kanashimi Rock Festival" | 50 | – | Kanashimi |
| 2006 | "headphone music" | 61 | – | Skirt |
| 2006 | "Split" | 34 | – | Skirt |
| 2007 | "Yasashii Uta" | 62 | – | Skirt |
| 2007 | "Tsutaete Yo / Kimagure Na Kisetsu No Sei De" | 79 | – | Birthday |
| 2008 | "Iitai Koto Wa Itsumo" | 76 | – | Birthday |
| 2008 | "Kyouhansha" | 91 | – | Birthday |
| 2009 | "Rodeo" | 68 | – | BEST |
| 2012 | "Slow Dance" | 103 | – | 8 Eight |
| 2016 | "Nakushita Hibi ni Sayonara" | – | – | 0 |
| 2020 | "Kimi ni Uta Uta" | – | – | |
| 2020 | "Koko ni Aru Mono" | – | – | |
