= Driving in the Silence =

EP by Maaya Sakamoto
- Released: November 9, 2011
- Genre: J-pop
- Label: FlyingDog
- Producers: Mitsuyoshi Tamura; Maaya Sakamoto

Maaya Sakamoto chronology
You Can't Catch Me (2011)	Driving in the Silence (2011)	Single Collection+ Mitsubachi (2012)

Driving in the Silence is the third concept album by Japanese singer-songwriter Maaya Sakamoto, released on November 9, 2011, through FlyingDog.

== Concept and development ==
Following her earlier concept albums Easy Listening (2001) and 30minutes Night Flight (2007), this EP centers around the theme of "winter," specifically an "indoor winter" as described by Sakamoto. Sakamoto described the album's concept inspiration as: "I wanted to focus on a personal space for listening at home or the intimate moments shared with close friends—a small, private world." This theme of an "indoor winter" guided the collaboration with various writers and musicians, resulting in a cohesive yet varied collection of songs.

The extended play consists of nine new songs themed around winter, produced and arranged by Shin Kono. The title track, "Driving In The Silence," sets the tone for the album with its reflective and serene sound. Sakamoto noted, "I wrote the lyrics imagining a space where you're cut off from the outside world, like when you're driving alone in a car, in a moment that's just yours." The song was originally written during the production of her earlier album Kazeyomi but was held back for this project, with music later composed by Rei Shibakusa. The album emphasizes live instrumentation to create a calm, home-like atmosphere, as Sakamoto aimed for "a calm, home-like feel centered on live instruments."

Despite this unified sound, the tracks vary in style, incorporating contributions from new collaborators. Swedish artist Rasmus Faber contributed to three songs: "Sayonara Santa," "Melt the Snow in Me," and "Kyokuya" (Polar Night). Sakamoto highlighted the collaboration with Faber, noting, "My connection with Rasmus started when he covered my debut song for his own album. For this winter-themed album, I had a vague image of Scandinavia, so I thought, 'Why not ask someone living in Northern Europe to create something?'" Additionally, Ryo Nagano composed the jazzy "Kotoshi Ichiban" and the melodic "Tatoeba Ringo ga Te ni Ochiru You ni", blending maturity and playfulness. The closing track, "Chikai", was composed by Sakamoto herself, inspired by the 2011 Tōhoku earthquake and tsunami. Reflecting on its creation, she said, "After the earthquake, all my live performances and other work were postponed, and I was stuck at home. I felt like I had to do something, so I sat at the piano."

Sakamoto expressed her affection for the album, stating, "I really love this album. I hope it becomes the kind of album you pull out when you feel 'winter is here' and listen to one last time as 'winter is ending.'" She described the album as "nicely mature, playful, and feels very free".

== Commercial performance ==
The album debuted at number 3 on the Oricon Weekly Albums Chart, with initial sales of 17,500 copies. This marked the fourth consecutive album by Sakamoto to reach the top 3 on this chart, which started from her sixth original album, Kazeyomi. It also became Sakamoto's first concept album to reach the top 3 on the Japanese charts. The EP ended up charting for 5 weeks, selling 22,000 copies in total.

== Track listing ==
All lyrics are written by Maaya Sakamoto, unless otherwise noted.

No.	Title	Lyrics	Music	Length
1.	"Driving In The Silence"		Rei Shibakusa	2:22
2.	"Sayonara Santa"		Rasmus Faber; Frida Sundemo	3:37
3.	"Melt The Snow In Me"	Faber; Sundemo	Faber; Sundemo	3:52
4.	"Homemade Christmas"		Ryo Eguchi	4:37
5.	"Kotoshi Ichiban" (今年いちばん, lit. 'The Best This Year')		Ryo Nagano	4:23
6.	"Tatoeba Ringo ga Te ni Ochiru Yō ni" (たとえばリンゴが手に落ちるように, lit. 'Like an Apple Falling into Your Hand')		Nagano	4:10
7.	"Kyokuya" (極夜, lit. 'Polar Night')		Faber; Sundemo	5:43
8.	"Chikai" (誓い, lit. 'Oath')		Maaya Sakamoto	5:12
9.	"Driving In The Silence" (Reprise)		Shibakusa	0:46

== Charts ==
Chart performance for Driving in the Silence
Chart (2011)	Peak position
Japan (Oricon)	3
Japan Top Album Sales (Billboard Japan)	3
