= Down Town / Yasashisa ni Tsutsumareta Nara =

Single by Maaya Sakamoto

from the album You Can't Catch Me
- Released: October 20, 2010
- Recorded: 2010
- Genre: J-pop
- Label: Victor Entertainment
- Songwriters: Taro Yamashita; Ginji Ito; Takayuki Hattori; Yumi Arai; DEPAPEPE; Hachiro Sato; Kazuhiko Katō; J.A.M

Maaya Sakamoto singles chronology
"Magic Number" (2009)	"Down Town / Yasashisa ni Tsutsumareta Nara" (2010)	"Buddy" (2011)

Music video
- "Down Town" on YouTube

Down Town / Yasashisa ni Tsutsumareta Nara is Maaya Sakamoto's nineteenth single. "Down Town" is used as an opening theme for the anime series And Yet the Town Moves (Soredemo Machi wa Mawatteiru) while "Yasashisa ni Tsutsumareta Nara" is the opening theme for the OVA Tamayura. The original version of this song was released in 1974 by Yumi Arai, who was also its composer and lyricist, and was used as the ending song for Kiki's Delivery Service (Majo no Takkyūbin). It is Sakamoto's first single to come in CD+DVD and CD only editions.

All three tracks from this single are covers of 1970s hit songs. "Down Town" is originally sung by Japanese musical group Sugar Babe, "Yasashisa ni Tsutsumareta Nara" is a Yumi Arai cover while "Kanashikute Yarikirenai" was first performed by The Folk Crusaders.

== Track listing ==
CD (VTCL-35092)
No.	Title	Lyrics	Music	Length
1.	"Down Town" (Soredemo Machi wa Mawatteiru opening theme song)	Ginji Ito	Tatsuro Yamashita; Takayuki Hattori (arranger)
2.	"Yasashisa ni Tsutsumareta Nara (やさしさに包まれたなら, Embraced by the Tenderness)" (Tamayura opening theme song)	Yumi Arai	Yumi Arai; DEPAPEPE(arrange)
3.	"Kanashikute Yarikirenai (悲しくてやりきれない, It's So Sad)"	Hachiro Sato	Kazuhiko Katō; J.A.M(arrange)
4.	"Down Town" (Instrumental)		Tatsuro Yamashita; Takayuki Hattori (arranger)
5.	"Yasashisa ni Tsutsumareta Nara" (Instrumental)		Yumi Arai; DEPAPEPE(arrange)
6.	"Kanashikute Yarikirenai" (Instrumental)		Kazuhiko Katō; J.A.M(arrange)

CD + DVD (VTZL-16)
No.	Title	Length
1.	"Down Town" (PV)

== Charts ==
Chart	Peak position	Sales
Oricon Weekly Singles	5	25,429
