= You Can't Catch Me (album) =

Studio album by Maaya Sakamoto
- Released: January 12, 2011
- Genre: J-pop
- Label: Victor Entertainment

Maaya Sakamoto chronology
Everywhere (2010)	You Can't Catch Me (2011)	Driving in the Silence (2011)

Singles from You Can't Catch Me
- 1. "Down Town / Yasashisa ni Tsutsumareta Nara" Released: October 20, 2010

You Can't Catch Me is Maaya Sakamoto's seventh studio album. The first pressing came with a bonus CD featuring seven live tracks from Sakamoto's memorial concert "Gift" in Budokan in March 2010. A PV version for the track "Himitsu" was also made to promote the album. It is Sakamoto's first album to reach number one on the Oricon chart, and the first of either her albums or singles to do so.

== Track listing ==
CD (VTCL-60209)
No.	Title	Lyrics	Music	Length
1.	"Eternal Return"	Maaya Sakamoto	Atsushi Suemitsu	4:14
2.	"Himitsu (秘密, Secret)"	Maaya Sakamoto	Jun Shibata; Zentaro Watanabe (arrangement)	4:33
3.	"DOWN TOWN" (Soredemo Machi wa Mawatteiru opening theme)	Ginji Ito	Taro Yamashita; Takayuki Hattori (arrangement)	3:55
4.	"Utsukushii Hito (美しい人, Beautiful Person)" (Kentoushi Fune Saigen Project theme song)	Maaya Sakamoto	Yoko Kanno	5:02
5.	"Kimi no Sei (キミノセイ, Your Fault)"	Suneohair	Suneohair	5:12
6.	"Zero to Ichi (ゼロとイチ, Zero and One)"	Shintaro Tokita	Shintaro Tokita; Masahito Ishinari (arrangement)	4:42
7.	"Mizuumi (みずうみ, Lake)"	Maaya Sakamoto	Kaori Kano	6:08
8.	"Stand up, girls!"	Maaya Sakamoto	Shōko Suzuki	3:49
9.	"Mirai Chizu (ミライ地図, Map of the Future)"	Hidetoshi Sakurai	Hidetoshi Sakurai	4:50
10.	"Moonlight (Mata wa "Kimi ga Nemuru Tame no Ongaku") (ムーンライト(または“きみが眠るための音楽”, Moonlight (or "Music to Put You to Sleep))"	Maaya Sakamoto	Yasuyuki Horigome; Keiichi Tomita (arrangement)	4:48
11.	"Tegami (手紙, Letter)"	Maaya Sakamoto	Katsutoshi Kitagawa	2:19
12.	"Topia (トピア)"	Maaya Sakamoto	Kana Yabuki; Shin Kōno (arrangement)	5:05

Bonus CD (VTZL-22)
No.	Title	Length
1.	"Everywhere ~opening~"
2.	"Gift"
3.	"Hemisphere (ヘミソフィア)"
4.	"0331 medley" (featuring Yoko Kanno)
5.	"I.D."
6.	"Magic Number" (featuring Shōko Suzuki)
7.	"Everywhere ~piano&vocals~"

== Charts ==
Chart	Peak position	Sales
Oricon Weekly Albums	1	39,861
