= Magic Number (song) =

2009 single by Maaya Sakamoto

Single by Maaya Sakamoto
- B-side: "Private Sky"
- Released: November 11, 2009
- Recorded: 2009
- Genre: J-pop
- Label: Victor Entertainment
- Songwriters: Maaya Sakamoto; Katsutoshi Kitagawa
- Producers: Maaya Sakamoto; Mitsuyoshi Tamura

Maaya Sakamoto singles chronology
"Ame ga Furu" (2008)	"Magic Number" (2009)	"Down Town / Yasashisa ni Tsutsumareta Nara" (2010)

Music video
- "Magic Number" on YouTube

"Magic Number" (マジックナンバー) is Maaya Sakamoto's eighteenth single. The title track was used as the opening theme for the anime Kobato. The live version of Kazamidori and Pocket wo Kara ni Shite are from her concert at Tokyo International Forum Hall A on January 24, 2009, with live arrangement by Shin Kono.

== Track listing ==
CD (VTCL-35077)
No.	Title	Lyrics	Music	Length
1.	"Magic Number (マジックナンバー)" (Kobato opening theme song)	Maaya Sakamoto	Katsutoshi Kitagawa
2.	"Private Sky"	Maaya Sakamoto	Kōichi Tabo
3.	"Kazamidori (カザミドリ, Weather Vane)" (Live Version)	Maaya Sakamoto	Haruna Yokota; Shin Kōno (arrangement)
4.	"Pocket wo Kara ni Shite (ポケットを空にして, Empty the Pocket)" (Live Version)	Yūho Iwasato	Yoko Kanno; Shin Kono (arrangement)

== Charts ==
Chart	Peak position	Sales
Oricon Weekly Singles	12	20,046
