= Cowboy Bebop (disambiguation) =

Cowboy Bebop is a 1998 Japanese anime series.

Cowboy Bebop may also refer to:

- Cowboy Bebop (1998 video game), a 1998 video game for PlayStation
- Cowboy Bebop: Tsuioku no Serenade, a 2005 video game for PlayStation 2
- Cowboy Bebop: The Movie, a 2001 animated film
- Cowboy Bebop (2021 TV series), a Netflix live-action remake of the 1998 anime

== See also ==
- Music of Cowboy Bebop
