= Space Bio Charge =

Earth Tour Commemorative Collection Album: Space Bio Charge

Compilation album by Yoko Kanno & Seatbelts
- Released: May 26, 2009
- Recorded: 1993–2008
- Genres: Avant-pop; jazz; rock; soul; funk; blues; electronica; orchestral pop
- Length: 179 minutes
- Languages: Japanese; English; Arabic; Russian; Portuguese; Italian
- Label: Victor Entertainment
- Producer: Yoko Kanno

Yoko Kanno & Seatbelts chronology
Macross Frontier Vocal Collection Nyan Tama♀ (2008)	Earth Tour Commemorative Collection Album: Space Bio Charge (2009)	Napple Tale: Yōsei Zukan (2009)

Yoko Kanno Seatbelts Earth Tour Commemorative Collection Album: Space Bio Charge (YOKO KANNO SEATBELTS 来地球記念コレクションアルバム スペース バイオチャージ, Yoko Kanno Seatbelts Rai Chikyū Kinen Korekushon Arubamu Supēsu Baio Chāji) is a compilation album by Japanese musician Yoko Kanno and her band Seatbelts, released by Flying Dog on May 26, 2009. The three-disc album features selected songs and background music from Kanno's works such as Cowboy Bebop, Ghost in the Shell: Stand Alone Complex, Wolf's Rain, The Vision of Escaflowne, and the Macross franchise.

The album peaked at No. 6 on Oricon's Weekly Albums chart.

== Track listing ==
All music is composed by Yoko Kanno.

Disc 1
No.	Title	Lyrics	Artist(s)	Length
1.	"Fly Up in the Air (eco. size)" (from Macross Plus)		Members of Israel Philharmonic Orchestra	2:54
2.	"Tank! (TV stretch)" (from Cowboy Bebop)		Seatbelts	3:26
3.	"Kouya no Heath (荒野のヒース, Heath of the Wasteland)" (from Genesis of Aquarion)	Yuho Iwasato	Akino	5:34
4.	"Torukia (eco. size) (トルキア)" (from Ghost in the Shell: Stand Alone Complex)	Gabriela Robin	Gabriela Robin	5:34
5.	"What Planet Is This" (from Cowboy Bebop: The Movie)		Seatbelts	2:45
6.	"High Heel Runaway (eco. size) (ハイヒールラナウェイ)" (from Darker Than Black)		Yoko Kanno	2:41
7.	"Ask DNA (eco. size)" (from Cowboy Bebop: The Movie)	Tim Jensen	Raju Ramayya	4:41
8.	"Could you bite the hand?" (from Wolf's Rain)	Jensen	Steve Conte	3:37
9.	"Player (eco. size)" (from Ghost in the Shell: Stand Alone Complex – Solid State Society)	Origa	Origa with Heartsdales	5:34
10.	"Power of the Light (eco. size)" (from Brain Powerd)		Yoko Kanno	2:44
11.	"Kagirinaki Tabiji (限りなき旅路; The Endless Journey)" (from Turn A Gundam)	C.Piece	Aki Okui	4:59
12.	"Dance of Curse (eco. size)" (from The Vision of Escaflowne)		Yoko Kanno	2:52
13.	"Genesis of Aquarion" (from Genesis of Aquarion)	Iwasato; Kanno	AKINO feat. Bless4	3:12
14.	"Lithium Flower" (from Ghost in the Shell: Stand Alone Complex)	Troy	Scott Matthew	3:25
15.	"Shiro, Long Tail's" (from Wolf's Rain)		Yoko Kanno	3:11
16.	"Inner Universe (eco. size)" (from Ghost in the Shell: Stand Alone Complex)	Origa; Shanti Snyder	Origa	4:35
17.	"Lion (ライオン)" (from Macross Frontier)	Robin	May'n & Megumi Nakajima	5:03
18.	"Chikyuu Kyoumei (地球共鳴, Earth Resonance)" (from Earth Girl Arjuna)	Robin	Gabriela Robin	2:01
19.	"Rakuen ~ secret garden (ラクエン ~ secret garden; Paradise ~ secret garden)" (from Wolf's Rain)		Yoko Kanno	5:24
Total length:				74:22

Disc 2
No.	Title	Lyrics	Artist	Length
1.	"Moon (eco. size)" (from Turn A Gundam)	Robin	Gabriela Robin	5:06
2.	"High Spirit" (from Genesis of Aquarion)		Yoko Kanno	3:09
3.	"Yakusoku wa Iranai (eco. size) (約束はいらない; I Don't Need a Promise)" (from The Vision of Escaflowne)	Iwasato	Maaya Sakamoto	3:02
4.	"Be Human" (from Ghost in the Shell: Stand Alone Complex)	Troy	Scott Matthew	4:05
5.	"Get9 (hyper eco. size)" (from Ghost in the Shell: Stand Alone Complex)	Jensen	jillmax	3:21
6.	"The Garden of Everything ~Denki Roketto ni Kimi wo Tsurete~ (The Garden of Everything ~電気ロケットに君を連れて~; The Garden of Everything ~Taking You on an Electrical Rocket)" (from RahXephon: Pluralitas Concentio)	Chris Mosdell; Sakamoto	Maaya Sakamoto feat. Steve Conte	6:19
7.	"Coração Selvagem" (from Wolf's Rain)	Joyce	Joyce	3:31
8.	"Hamduche" (from Cowboy Bebop: The Movie)	Hassan Bohmide	Hassan Bohmide	1:53
9.	"Voices" (from Macross Plus)	Wakako Kaku	Akino Arai	3:49
10.	"Clóe (eco. size)" (from Earth Girl Arjuna)	Robin	Chinatsu Yamamoto	3:01
11.	"White Falcon" (from Turn A Gundam)		Yoko Kanno	1:22
12.	"The Real Folk Blues (save money size)" (from Cowboy Bebop)	Iwasato	Mai Yamane	5:02
13.	"I do" (from Ghost in the Shell: Stand Alone Complex)	Ilaria Graziano	Ilaria Graziano	4:54
14.	"End title Nostalgina (End title ノスタルジーナ)" (from Turn A Gundam)		Yoko Kanno	4:46
15.	"Yubiwa (Single Ver.) (指輪; Ring)" (from Escaflowne: The Movie)	Iwasato	Maaya Sakamoto	3:47
16.	"Toki no Kioku (時の記憶, Memories of Time)" (from Please Save My Earth)	Takako Nishikiori; Arion	Seika	4:23
17.	"Blue" (from Cowboy Bebop)	Jensen	Mai Yamane	5:07
18.	"The Story of Escaflowne (eco. size)" (from The Vision of Escaflowne)		Yoko Kanno	4:15
Total length:				71:02

Disc 3
No.	Title	Lyrics	Artist	Length
1.	"Sasurai no Cowboy (さすらいのカウボーイ; Wandering Cowboy)" (from Cowboy Bebop)	Shinichirō Watanabe	Aoi Tada	3:16
2.	"Doggy Dog (hungry size)" (from Cowboy Bebop)	Robin	Seatbelts	2:51
3.	"Neko no Kimochi (demo version) (猫のキモチ; A Cat's Feelings)" (from The Vision of Escaflowne)	Robin	Gabriela Robin	3:50
4.	"Miwaku no Horse Riding (魅惑のホースライディング; Charming Horse Riding)" (from Cowboy Bebop)	Watanabe; Keiko Nobumoto	Masashi Ehara	2:38
5.	"Wo Qui Non Coin" (from Cowboy Bebop)	Robin	Aoi Tada	3:41
6.	"No Money (more money size)" (from Cowboy Bebop: The Movie)	Watanabe; Kanno; Bohmide	Hassan Bohmide	1:20
7.	"Waratteta (笑ってた, Smile)" (from Ōban Star-Racers)	Iwasato; Kanno	Sukoshi	4:45
8.	"Cat’s Delicacy" (from The Vision of Escaflowne)	Robin	Gabriela Robin	3:21
9.	"AI Sentai Tachikomans (AI戦隊タチコマンズ; AI Combat Team Tachikomans)" (from Ghost in the Shell: Stand Alone Complex)	Yoshiki Sakurai	Sakiko Tamagawa	1:06
10.	"Ranka to Bobby no SMS Shoutai no Uta (ランカとボビーのSMS小隊の歌; Ranka and Bobby's SMS Platoon Theme)" (from Macross Frontier)	Shoji Kawamori	Megumi Nakajima & Kenta Miyake	1:00
11.	"ABC Mouse Parade" (from Please Save My Earth)	Robin	Gabriela Robin	5:08
12.	"Yoake no Octave (夜明けのオクターブ; Dawn’s Octave)" (from Napple Tale: Arsia in Daydream)	Hiroshi Ichikura	Maaya Sakamoto	1:51
Total length:				34:53

== Charts ==
Chart	Peak position	Sales
Oricon Weekly Albums	6	38,316
