= Music of Cowboy Bebop =

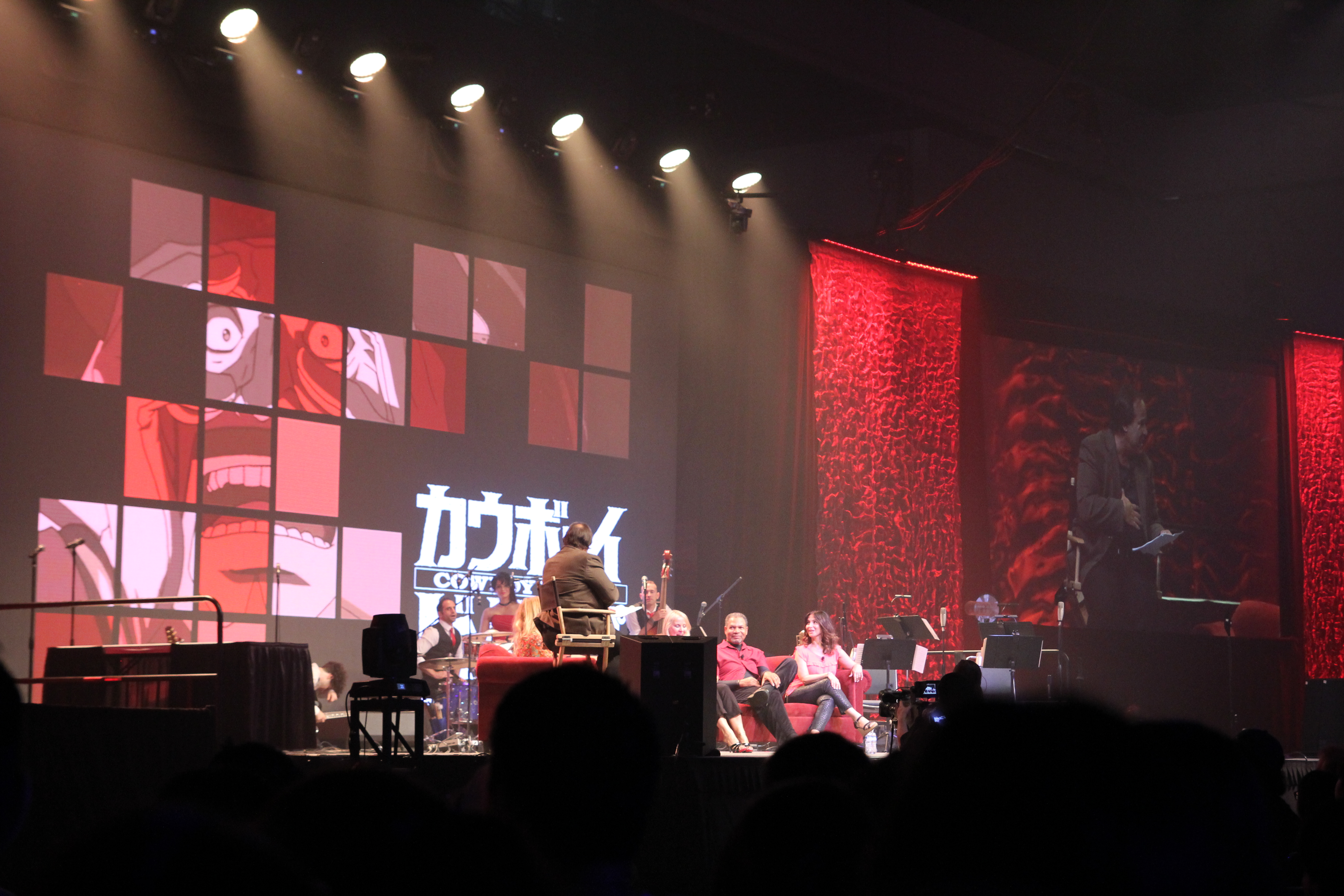
Image of the Cowboy Bebop Live Orchestra playing.

The Cowboy Bebop anime series was accompanied by a number of soundtrack albums composed by Yoko Kanno and Seatbelts, a diverse band Kanno formed to create the music for the series, with a principal focus in jazz. The soundtrack was released in the American market by Victor Entertainment, a subsidiary of JVC Kenwood.

== Theme songs ==
=== "Tank!" ===
"Tank!" is the series' opening song. The song, written by Yoko Kanno and performed by Seatbelts, has an extensive alto saxophone solo played by Masato Honda, as well as a fill part at the end. The song is a big band jazz piece in a Latin-infused hard bop style with a rhythm section that combines a double bass and bongo drums.

"Tank!" is primarily an instrumental piece, though it does feature some spoken male vocals (provided by long-time collaborator with Kanno, Tim Jensen) in the introductory portion of the song, thematically jazz in style. The vocal portion provides a lead-in to the instrumental portion, and its final lyrics, "I think it's time we blow this scene. Get everybody and their stuff together. Okay, three, two, one let's jam", signal the beginning bursts of the majority, purely instrumental end of the song.

It has been featured on the soundtracks to the series and was used on the preview for TV series My Own Worst Enemy. Figure skater Kevin Reynolds performed his short program for the 2016 Canadian National Figure Skating Championships to "Tank!", and did it dressed as Spike Spiegel.

=== "The Real Folk Blues" ===
"The Real Folk Blues" is the first ending theme for Cowboy Bebop. The song was performed by Seatbelts, featuring vocals by Mai Yamane. The song was composed and arranged by Yoko Kanno, with lyrics by Yuho Iwasato. The track appears on the series-related album Cowboy Bebop Vitaminless (カウボーイビバップ ビタミンレス, Kaubōi Bibappu Bitaminresu). The song is one of few songs in the series to be sung in Japanese.

The song is not used for the end credits in "Jupiter Jazz, Pt. II" (the song used for the end credits in "Jupiter Jazz, Pt. II" is "Space Lion") and the finale, "The Real Folk Blues". However, an alternate version of the song entitled "See You Space Cowboy..." plays during the final episode as the prelude to the climax. It appears on the Cowboy Bebop Blue album as a bonus track.

== Studio recordings ==
=== Cowboy Bebop ===
Cowboy Bebop

Soundtrack album by Seatbelts
- Released: May 21, 1998
- Studio: Sound Valley Studio; Soundtrack Studio; Van Gelder Studio, Englewood Cliffs, NJ; Victor "Aoyama" "Yamananako" Studio; Z'd Studio
- Genre: Hard bop, big band, blues
- Length: 53:25
- Label: Victor Entertainment
- Producer: Yoko Kanno

Cowboy Bebop is the first album created for the series, and the most easily categorized in terms of genre, as an outlet for many of the trademark bebop tracks. It begins with the show's theme song, "Tank!". The track "Bad Dog No Biscuits" opens with a cover of the Tom Waits composition "Midtown" before diverting in its interpretation.

The album received a rating of five out of five stars from AllMusic.

Track Listing
No.	Title	Lyrics	Artist	Length
1.	"Tank!"			3:30
2.	"Rush"			3:34
3.	"Spokey Dokey"			4:05
4.	"Bad Dog No Biscuits"			4:10
5.	"Cat Blues"			2:37
6.	"Cosmos"			1:37
7.	"Space Lion"			7:11
8.	"Waltz for Zizi"			3:30
9.	"Piano Black"			2:48
10.	"Pot City"			2:14
11.	"Too Good Too Bad"			2:35
12.	"Car24"			2:49
13.	"The Egg and I"			2:43
14.	"Felt Tip Pen"			2:43
15.	"Rain"	Tim Jensen	Steve Conte	3:24
16.	"Digging My Potato"			2:25
17.	"Memory" (Music box overdubbed)			1:32
Total length:				53:25

=== Cowboy Bebop Vitaminless ===
Cowboy Bebop Vitaminless

Soundtrack album by Seatbelts
- Released: June 3, 1998
- Recorded: Van Gelder Studio
- Length: 28:27
- Label: Victor Entertainment
- Producer: Yoko Kanno

Cowboy Bebop Vitaminless (カウボーイビバップ ビタミンレス, Kaubōi Bibappu Bitaminresu) is the first mini-album. It features the end credits theme from the series, "The Real Folk Blues".

The middle section of "Spy" was later reprised in "You Make Me Cool", which appears on the No Disc album.

Track Listing
No.	Title	Lyrics	Artist	Length
1.	"The Real Folk Blues"	Yuho Iwasato	Mai Yamane	6:16
2.	"Odd Ones"		New York Musicians	3:09
3.	"Doggy Dog"		Philippe Nalry	3:14
4.	"Cats on Mars"	Gabriela Robin	Gabriela Robin	2:44
5.	"Spy"		Seatbelts	2:01
6.	"Fantaisie Sign"	Carla Vallet	Carla Vallet	4:57
7.	"Piano Bar I"		Mark Soskin	3:04
8.	"Black Coffee" (Bonus Track)		New York Musicians	3:14
Total length:				28:27

=== Cowboy Bebop No Disc ===
Cowboy Bebop No Disc

Soundtrack album by Seatbelts
- Released: October 21, 1998
- Recorded: Victor Studio; Z'd Studio; Sound City Studios; Van Gelder Studio; Plus XXXstudio
- Length: 50:23
- Label: Victor Entertainment
- Producer: Yoko Kanno

Cowboy Bebop No Disc (カウボーイビバップ ノーディスク, Kaubōi Bibappu No Disuku) is the second soundtrack album, which has more stylistic variety than its predecessor, incorporating bluegrass music, heavy metal, Japanese pop, lounge, swing, chorale and scat-singing, among other styles, as well as the usual blues and jazz pieces.

Track Listing
No.	Title	Lyrics	Artist	Length
1.	"American Money"			1:07
2.	"Fantaisie Sign"	Carla Vallet	Carla Vallet	5:19
3.	"Don't Bother None"	Tim Jensen	Mai Yamane	3:39
4.	"Vitamin A"			0:10
5.	"Live in Baghdad"	Gabriela Robin	Masaaki Endoh	3:22
6.	"Cats on Mars"	Gabriela Robin	Gabriela Robin	2:44
7.	"Want It All Back"	Tim Jensen	Mai Yamane	4:10
8.	"Bindy"			2:18
9.	"You Make Me Cool"	Brian Richy	Masayoshi Furukawa	3:11
10.	"Vitamin B"			0:08
11.	"Green Bird"	Gabriela Robin	Gabriela Robin	1:53
12.	"Elm"		Pierre Bensusan	5:04
13.	"Vitamin C"			0:06
14.	"Gateway"			2:58
15.	"The Singing Sea"	Chris Mosdell	Tulivu-Donna Cumberbatch	4:39
16.	"The Egg and You"			3:42
17.	"Forever Broke"			3:14
18.	"Power of Kung Food Remix" (Arranged by DJ Food)			5:28
Total length:				50:23

=== Cowboy Bebop Blue ===
Cowboy Bebop Blue

Soundtrack album by Seatbelts
- Released: May 1, 1999
- Recorded: Van Gelder Studio
- Length: 71:18
- Label: Victor Entertainment

Cowboy Bebop Blue is the third soundtrack album, featuring many vocal pieces including a unique variation of "Ave Maria" performed by Jerzy Knetig and the Warsaw Philharmonic Orchestra.

It was released on May 1, 1999. Regarding the album, Cammila Collar of AllMusic wrote: "Of the more than ten discs released in conjunction with Cowboy Bebop, Blue is undoubtedly the best, representing the widest variety of genres."

Track Listing
No.	Title	Lyrics	Artist	Length
1.	"Blue"	Tim Jensen	Mai Yamane	5:01
2.	"Words That We Couldn't Say"	Tim Jensen	Steve Conte	3:27
3.	"Autumn in Ganymede"			3:54
4.	"Mushroom Hunting" (Based on a track by DJ Food, who performed Power of Kung Food Remix on the No Disc album.)		Tulivu-Donna Cumberbatch	3:18
5.	"Go Go Cactus Man"			2:37
6.	"Chicken Bone"	Gabriela Robin	Sydney and Sister R	4:55
7.	"The Real Man"			4:00
8.	"N.Y. Rush"			5:03
9.	"Adieu"	Brian Richy	Emily Bindiger	5:39
10.	"Call Me Call Me"	Tim Jensen	Steve Conte	4:42
11.	"Ave Maria"	Gabriela Robin	Jerzy Knetig	5:47
12.	"Stella by Moor"			1:08
13.	"Flying Teapot"	Tomoko Tane	Emily Bindiger	3:32
14.	"Wo Qui Non Coin"	Gabriela Robin	Aoi Tada	3:41
15.	"Road to the West"			2:52
16.	"Farewell Blues"			5:12
17.	"See You Space Cowboy... (Not Final Mix Mountain Root)" (Hidden track. An alternative rendition of The Real Folk Blues.)	Mai Yamane	Mai Yamane	5:55
Total length:				71:18

=== Ask DNA ===
Ask DNA

Soundtrack album by Seatbelts
- Released: July 25, 2001
- Recorded: Van Gelder Studio
- Length: 18:39
- Label: Victor Entertainment
- Producer: Yoko Kanno

Ask DNA is a maxi single released in 2001, an accompaniment to Cowboy Bebop Future Blues. It consists of a few highlights from Cowboy Bebop: The Movie, including the title theme, "Ask DNA".

Track Listing
No.	Title	Lyrics	Artist	Length
1.	"What Planet Is This?!"			2:45
2.	"Ask DNA"	Tim Jensen	Raj Ramayya	4:52
3.	"Cosmic Dare (Pretty with a Pistol)"	Raj Ramayya	Reynada Hill	4:28
4.	"Hamduche"	Hassan Bohmide	Hassan Bohmide	1:54
5.	"Is It Real?"	Tim Jensen	Scott Matthew	4:40
Total length:				18:39

=== Future Blues ===
Future Blues

Soundtrack album by Seatbelts
- Released: August 29, 2001
- Recorded: Victor Studio; Sound City Studios; Van Gelder Studio; Crescente; Soundtrack Studio; Riversound Studio
- Length: 71:11
- Label: Victor Entertainment
- Producer: Yoko Kanno

Future Blues is the main soundtrack from Cowboy Bebop: The Movie. It explores styles such as country-western and Arabic music.

The song "3.14" features Aoi Tada reciting the first 53 digits of pi to a tune.

Track Listing
No.	Title	Lyrics	Artist	Length
1.	"24 Hours Open"			3:21
2.	"Pushing the Sky"	Jinghiskhanman	Mai Yamane	4:07
3.	"Time to Know ~ Be Waltz"		Hideyuki Takahashi	3:49
4.	"Clutch"			5:15
5.	"Musawe"		Hassan Bohmide	3:28
6.	"Yo Pumpkin Head"			4:04
7.	"Diggin'" (Guitar: Kiyoshi Tuchiya)	Tim Jensen	Steve Conte	5:05
8.	"3.14"	Yoko Kanno	Aoi Tada	1:37
9.	"What Planet Is This?!" (Extended Version)		Mai Yamane, Mayu Jensen, Tim Jensen, Mataro Misawa (backing vocals)	4:31
10.	"7 Minutes"			6:46
11.	"Fingers"			4:24
12.	"Powder"			1:30
13.	"Butterfly"	Chris Mosdell	Mem Nahadr	4:57
14.	"No Reply"	Tim Jensen	Steve Conte	5:59
15.	"Dijurido"		Gabriela Robin	1:55
16.	"Gotta Knock a Little Harder"	Tim Jensen	Mai Yamane	5:19
17.	"No Money"		Hassan Bohmide	1:06
18.	"Rain" (Bonus Track, Mai Yamane Version)	Tim Jensen	Mai Yamane	3:23
Total length:				71:11

=== Cowboy Bebop Tank! THE! BEST! ===
Cowboy Bebop Tank! THE! BEST!

Soundtrack album by Seatbelts
- Released: December 22, 2004
- Recorded: Van Gelder Studio
- Length: 51:59
- Label: Victor Entertainment
- Producer: Yoko Kanno

Cowboy Bebop Tank! THE! BEST! compiles previously released material, mostly vocal pieces, with three all-new songs written for the 2005 PlayStation 2 game Cowboy Bebop: Tsuioku no Serenade, featuring the vocals of Ilaria Graziano. The first pressing of the CD included a bonus sticker. These songs were the last new material released by Seatbelts.

Track Listing
No.	Title	Lyrics	Artist	Length
1.	"Tank! (TV stretch)"			3:30
2.	"What Planet Is This?!"			3:31
3.	"Cosmic Dare (Pretty with a Pistol)"	Raj Ramayya	Reynada Hill	4:29
4.	"Diamonds"		Ilaria Graziano	4:01
5.	"Don't Bother None (TV edit)"	Tim Jensen	Mai Yamane	2:55
6.	"Piano Black"			2:47
7.	"Mushroom Hunting"		Tulivu-Donna Cumberbatch	3:19
8.	"No Reply"	Tim Jensen	Steve Conte	6:01
9.	"Blue"	Tim Jensen	Mai Yamane	5:04
10.	"Einstein Groovin'"	Ilaria Graziano	Ilaria Graziano	6:19
11.	"Pearls"	Ilaria Graziano	Ilaria Graziano	4:44
12.	"Gotta Knock a Little Harder"	Tim Jensen	Mai Yamane	5:24
Total length:				51:59

== Miscellaneous ==
=== Cowboy Bebop Remixes: Music for Freelance ===
Cowboy Bebop Remixes: Music for Freelance

Remix album by Seatbelts
- Released: June 6, 1999
- Recorded: Various
- Genre: Jazz, electronic
- Length: 40:27
- Label: Victor Entertainment
- Producer: Yoko Kanno

Cowboy Bebop Remixes: Music for Freelance (カウボーイ ビバップ リミキシーズ ミュージック フォー フリーランス, Kaubōi Bibappu Rimikishīzu Myūjikku Fō Furīransu) is a collection of songs remixed by popular American and British DJs, including many from the popular Ninja Tune label. Mr. Scruff spoke to British magazine Impact of his remix of Cat Blues, telling Andrez Bergen that he chose it "as it was a great, old sounding tune, simple with loads of personality. The parts were so well recorded that it was a pleasure to remix! I chopped it up into a kind of stuttering drumbox jazz wobbler".

The premise of the album is that the CD is a recording of a pirate radio station, and each song is humorously introduced by the DJ (Watanabe), in English. These tracks are called the "Radio Free Mars Talks". They are credited as follows:

- Script: Shinichirō Watanabe, Dai Sato
- Translation: Agnes S. Kaku
- Narration: Peter Duimstra

Track Listing
No.	Title	Length
1.	"Radio Free Mars Talk 1"	1:13
2.	"Tank! (Luke Vibert Remix)"	3:37
3.	"Radio Free Mars Talk 2"	0:39
4.	"Forever Broke (Fila Brazillia Remix)"	5:23
5.	"Radio Free Mars Talk 3"	0:35
6.	"Cats on Mars (DMX Krew Remix)"	3:50
7.	"Radio Free Mars Talk 4"	0:49
8.	"Piano Black (Ian O'Brien Remix)"	6:51
9.	"Cat Blues (Mr. Scruff Remix)"	4:50
10.	"Radio Free Mars Talk 5"	0:44
11.	"Fe (DJ Vadim Remix)"	3:50
12.	"Fantaisie Sign (Ian Pooley Remix)"	5:18
13.	"Radio Free Mars Talk 6"	0:26
14.	"Space Lion (4hero Remix)"	6:19
15.	"Radio Free Mars Talk 7"	0:23
Total length:		40:27

=== Cowgirl Ed ===
Cowgirl Ed

Soundtrack album by Seatbelts
- Released: June 21, 2001
- Recorded: Van Gelder Studio
- Length: 18:30
- Label: Victor Entertainment
- Producer: Yoko Kanno

Cowgirl Ed is a limited edition Mini-CD. This single came packaged with the first pressing of Future Blues and is currently out of print.

Track Listing
No.	Title	Length
1.	"Goodnight Julia"	1:56
2.	"PAPA Plastic"	4:11
3.	"Telephone Shopping"	0:18
4.	"Kabutogani Kodai no Sakana" (The Horseshoe Crab, The Ancient Fish)	3:42
5.	"Slipper Sleaze"	3:32
6.	"23 Hanashi" (Episode 23)	4:51
Total length:		18:30

=== Cowboy Bebop Boxed Set ===
Cowboy Bebop Boxed Set

Box set by Seatbelts
- Released: June 21, 2002
- Recorded: Van Gelder Studio
- Label: Victor Entertainment (VIZL-64)

The Cowboy Bebop Boxed Set includes four regular size CDs, one bonus Mini CD, and a 52-page booklet (in Japanese). The booklet includes trivia, track listings, interviews, and lyrics. Disks 1, 2 and 3 contain new and previously released tracks from the series, performed by Seatbelts. Disk 4 contains live tracks from Seatbelts on tour, as well as some unreleased movie tracks. The dialogue tracks are not songs, rather, they are vocal samples taken directly from the Japanese version of the series. It was released on June 21, 2002, and is now out of production.

Sean Westergaard of AllMusic gave the boxed set four out of five stars, citing its eclectic blend of genres and an appeal going beyond anime fans to "any adventurous listener", but also mentioned that the spoken dialogue tracks detracted from its accessibility.

The scripts for the dialogue tracks are credited to Shinichiro Watanabe and Dai Sato and the translation was done by Agnes S. Kaku.

Tracks in bold are exclusive to this boxed set.

Disc 1
No.	Title	Lyrics	Vocals	Length
1.	"Dialogue 1-1"			00:30
2.	"**Tank! (TV Edit)**"			01:32
3.	"Dialogue 1-2"			00:16
4.	"**Want It All Back (clavinet hater version)**"	Tim Jensen	山根麻衣 (Mai Yamane)	04:01
5.	"Sax Quartet" (Yoko Kanno & Seatbelts)			04:01
6.	"Dialogue 1-3"			00:27
7.	"**Encore un Verre**"	Valentin Coupeau	Valentin Coupeau	02:49
8.	"**March For Koala**" (Yoko Kanno & Seatbelts)			01:01
9.	"Dialogue 1-4"			00:23
10.	"Felt Tip Pen" (Yoko Kanno & Seatbelts)			02:39
11.	"The Egg and You" (Yoko Kanno & Seatbelts)			03:39
12.	"Dialogue 1-5"			00:24
13.	"**Pot City II (Yab's Dub)**" (Yoko Kanno & Seatbelts)			02:18
14.	"Dialogue 1-6"			00:37
15.	"N.Y. Rush" (Yoko Kanno & Seatbelts)			05:03
16.	"Dialogue 1-7"			00:09
17.	"Fe" (Yoko Kanno & Seatbelts)			01:58
18.	"Piano Black" (Yoko Kanno & Seatbelts)			02:47
19.	"Dialogue 1-8"			00:11
20.	"**Spokey Dokey (alternate take)**" (Yoko Kanno & Seatbelts)			04:33
21.	"Forever Broke" (Yoko Kanno & Seatbelts)			03:14
22.	"Dialogue 1-9"			00:10
23.	"**Road to the West (with rhythm)**" (Yoko Kanno & Seatbelts)			02:53
24.	"Dialogue 1-10"			00:29
25.	"**Meteor**" (Yoko Kanno & Seatbelts)			01:51
26.	"Dialogue 1-11"			00:09
27.	"Digging My Potato" (Yoko Kanno & Seatbelts)			04:15
28.	"Dialogue 1-12"			00:11
29.	"**Rain (demo version)**"	Tim Jensen	山根麻衣 (Mai Yamane)	03:24
30.	"Dialogue 1-13"			00:20
31.	"Green Bird"	Gabriela Robin	Gabriela Robin	01:54

Disc 2
No.	Title	Lyrics	Vocals	Length
1.	"Dialogue 2-1"			00:34
2.	"Cats on Mars"	Gabriela Robin	Gabriela Robin	02:45
3.	"**Doggy Dog II**" (Yoko Kanno & Seatbelts)			03:47
4.	"**Doggy Dog III**" (Yoko Kanno & Seatbelts)			01:50
5.	"Dialogue 2-2"			00:18
6.	"Piano Bar I" (Yoko Kanno & Seatbelts)			03:04
7.	"**Give And Take**"	Sydney Thiam	Sydney Thiam	05:12
8.	"Dialogue 2-3"			00:04
9.	"Cat Blues" (Yoko Kanno & Seatbelts)			02:35
10.	"Dialogue 2-4"			00:31
11.	"**The Singing Sea II**"	Cris Mosdell	Tulivu-Donna Cumberbatch	04:23
12.	"Dialogue 2-5"			00:25
13.	"ELM"		Pierre Bensusan	05:04
14.	"Waltz for Zizi" (Yoko Kanno & Seatbelts)			03:30
15.	"Dialogue 2-6"			00:08
16.	"**Poor Faye (High Socks)**" (Yoko Kanno & Seatbelts)			01:07
17.	"**Farewell Blues (alternate take)**" (Yoko Kanno & Seatbelts)			04:30
18.	"Dialogue 2-7"			00:51
19.	"Words That We Couldn't Say"	Tim Jensen	Steve Conte	03:28
20.	"Dialogue 2-8"			00:09
21.	"**Space Lion (orgel version)**" (Yoko Kanno & Seatbelts)			01:34
22.	"**Waste Land**" (Yoko Kanno & Seatbelts)			01:52
23.	"Dialogue 2-9"			00:44
24.	"Goodnight Julia" (Yoko Kanno & Seatbelts)			01:49
25.	"Space Lion" (Yoko Kanno & Seatbelts)			07:07

Disc 3
No.	Title	Lyrics	Vocals	Length
1.	"Dialogue 3-1"			00:09
2.	"**Go Go Cactus Man (guitar version)**" (Yoko Kanno & Seatbelts)			00:55
3.	"Dialogue 3-2"			00:13
4.	"Too Good Too Bad" (Yoko Kanno & Seatbelts)			02:35
5.	"Dialogue 3-3"			00:07
6.	"**Eyeball**" (Yoko Kanno & Seatbelts)			01:02
7.	"Dialogue 3-4"			00:12
8.	"**Yuenchi**" (Yoko Kanno & Seatbelts)			03:45
9.	"**On the Run**" (Yoko Kanno & Seatbelts; originally by Pink Floyd)			03:50
10.	"Dialogue 3-5"			00:25
11.	"23 Wa (with dialogue)" (Episode 23)			04:52
12.	"Dialogue 3-6"			00:05
13.	"**Don't Bother None (long version)**"	Tim Jensen	山根麻衣 (Mai Yamane)	05:02
14.	"Dialogue 3-7"			00:25
15.	"**Wo Qui Non Coin (short, sad version)**"	Gabriela Robin	Aoi Tada	02:36
16.	"**Poor Faye (Lip Cream)**" (Yoko Kanno & Seatbelts)			01:04
17.	"Call Me Call Me"	Tim Jensen	Steve Conte	04:43
18.	"Dialogue 3-8"			00:25
19.	"Memory" (Yoko Kanno & Seatbelts)			01:31
20.	"**Adieu (long version)**"	Brian Richy	Emily Bindiger	06:13
21.	"Dialogue 3-9"			00:21
22.	"See You Space Cowboy... (Not Final Mix Mountain Root)"	山根麻衣 (Mai Yamane)	山根麻衣 (Mai Yamane)	05:56
23.	"Dialogue 3-10"			00:19
24.	"Blue"	Tim Jensen	山根麻衣 (Mai Yamane)	05:02

Disc 4
No.	Title	Length
1.	"**Tank! (live)**" (Yoko Kanno & Seatbelts)	04:01
2.	"**Rush (live)**" (Yoko Kanno & Seatbelts)	04:13
3.	"**What Planet Is This?! (live)**" (Yoko Kanno & Seatbelts)	04:53
4.	"**Too Good Too Bad (live)**" (Yoko Kanno & Seatbelts)	02:31
5.	"**Bad Dog No Biscuits (live)**" (Yoko Kanno & Seatbelts)	04:31
6.	"**Call Me Call Me (live)**" (Steve Conte)	05:20
7.	"**Mushroom Hunting (live)**" (Mai Yamane)	04:09
8.	"**The Real Folk Blues (live)**" (Mai Yamane)	06:08
9.	"**Piano solo (live)**" (Yoko Kanno & Seatbelts)	07:52
10.	"Ask DNA" (Raju Ramayya)	04:52
11.	"**SF Game Center**" (Yoko Kanno & Seatbelts)	01:27
12.	"**Rouya**" (Yoko Kanno & Seatbelts)	03:38
13.	"**Old School Game**" (Yoko Kanno & Seatbelts)	01:04

8 cm Mini-CD
No.	Title	Lyrics	Vocals	Length
1.	"**Wandering Cowboy (with vocals)**"	Shinichiro Watanabe & Yoko Kanno	Aoi Tada	03:18
2.	"**Fascinating Horse Riding**"	Shinichiro Watanabe & Yoko Kanno	Masashi Ebara	02:44
3.	"**Wandering Cowboy (karaoke version)**" (Inu to Utau Karaoke)		アイン (Ein)	03:19
Total length:				09:21

=== 12" Vinyl Singles ===
Accompanying the release of the Cowboy Bebop Remixes: Music for Freelance album and the Ask DNA maxi-single were two EPs released on 12-inch vinyl containing a selection of material from the aforementioned albums. Both EPs came in plain white jackets with printed graphics on the record label and played at 33⅓ rpm. Both albums were released independently with Remixes using the catalog number BEBOP 001 and Ask DNA using BEBOP 002.

The first EP, simply dubbed Remixes and released in 1999, contains 5 tracks taken from the Music for Freelance CD. Around the label there are trademarks for Sunrise and Victor Entertainment, followed by a line that reads DJ Promo Only Not for Resale. The track list for the EP is below;

Track Listing
No.	Title	Length
1.	"Side A: Tank! (Luke Vibert Remix)"	3:37
2.	"Side A: Cats on Mars (DMX Krew Remix)"	3:50
3.	"Side A: Fantasie Sign (Ian Pooley Remix)"	5:18
4.	"Side B: Piano Black (Ian O'Brien Remix)"	6:51
5.	"Side B: Space Lion (4hero Remix)"	6:19
Total length:		24:75

The second EP, dubbed Ask DNA and released in 2001, contains all 5 tracks from the Ask DNA maxi-single. This EP was released through the Cowboy Bebop Japanese fanclub as promotional material in limited quantities. It came in a plain white jacket with a sticker on the outside containing the Seatbelts logo and an advertisement for the CD release of Ask DNA. The track list for the EP is below;

Track Listing
No.	Title	Length
1.	"Side A: What Planet Is This?!"	2:45
2.	"Side A: Cosmic Dare (Pretty with a Pistol)"	4:28
3.	"Side A: Hamduche"	1:54
4.	"Side B: Is It Real?"	4:40
5.	"Side B: Ask DNA"	4:52
Total length:		18:37

=== The Real Folk Blues Charity Single for COVID-19 Relief ===
On May 1, 2020, a charity single of The Real Folk Blues was released by Mason Lieberman and Funimation to raise money for COVID-19 relief. The track features anime, game and music artists including Yoko Kanno and The Seatbelts, A-sha Mai Yamane, and Shihori, with cameos by voice-actors Steve Blum and Beau Billingslea. The single was available as a music video on YouTube, as a stream / download for purchase on Bandcamp and was also a Limited-Edition vinyl with B-side remix. Proceeds were donated to the CDC Foundation and Doctors without Borders.

== See also ==
- Space Bio Charge
- Shakkazombie
