= Cowboy Bebop (2021 TV series) =

American television series

- Genre: Science fiction; Space Western
- Based on: Cowboy Bebop by Sunrise Cowboy Bebop: The Movie – Knockin' on Heaven's Door by Sunrise, Bandai Namco Arts and Bones
- Developed by: Christopher Yost
- Showrunner: André Nemec
- Starring: John Cho; Mustafa Shakir; Daniella Pineda; Elena Satine; Alex Hassell
- Theme music composer: Yoko Kanno
- Opening theme: "Tank!" by Seatbelts
- Composer: Yoko Kanno
- Country of origin: United States
- Original language: English
- No. of seasons: 1
- No. of episodes: 10

Production
- Executive producers: Marty Adelstein; André Nemec; Jeff Pinkner; Josh Appelbaum; Scott Rosenberg; Becky Clements; Christopher Yost; Yasuo Miyakawa; Masayuki Ozaki; Shin Sasaki; Tim Coddington; Tetsu Fujimura; Michael Katleman; Matthew Weinberg
- Production location: New Zealand
- Running time: 39–52 minutes
- Production companies: Tomorrow Studios; Midnight Radio

Original release
- Network: Netflix
- Release: November 19, 2021

Cowboy Bebop is an American space Western television series. It is a live action series based on the 1998 Japanese anime television series Cowboy Bebop and the 2001 anime film Cowboy Bebop: The Movie. Set in the year 2071, it charts the adventures of a ragtag group of bounty hunters chasing down criminals across the Solar System on the Bebop spaceship.

The series was developed by Christopher Yost, with André Nemec as showrunner, and stars John Cho, Mustafa Shakir, Daniella Pineda, Elena Satine and Alex Hassell. The ten-episode series was released on Netflix on November 19, 2021, and was criticized for its writing, special effects, editing and action sequences, but was praised for its cast. Shinichirō Watanabe, the original series' director, publicly criticized the show for being disloyal to the source material. Less than a month later on December 9, 2021, Netflix canceled the series after one season, leaving the series on a cliffhanger.

== Cast and characters ==
=== Main ===
- John Cho as Spike Spiegel (also known as "Fearless"): a bounty hunter born on Mars with a history of violent gang activity and extensive fist-fighting and marksmanship abilities. For the role, Cho grew out his hair to mimic Spike's look from the anime. The anime director, Shinichirō Watanabe, explained in Cowboy Bebop: The Movie DVD extra that Spike was originally based on Yūsaku Matsuda, a Japanese-Korean actor.
- Daniella Pineda as Faye Valentine: a bounty hunter who woke up without her memories after being revived from cryosleep.
- Mustafa Shakir as Jet Black: Spike's partner, former ISSP detective, and captain of the Bebop, who has a cybernetic arm. He spent five years in prison over a wrongful conviction.
- Alex Hassell as Vicious: Spike's nemesis, a power-hungry gangster from the Red Dragon Crime Syndicate who was Spike's closest friend before they had a falling out.
- Elena Satine as Julia: a femme fatale who is as smart as she is beautiful. She has a complicated past with Spike and Vicious and is the object of both of their affections.

Additionally, Welsh Corgi dog actors Charlie and Harry play Ein, a dog with special abilities.

=== Recurring ===
- Tamara Tunie as Ana: The proprietor of an underground jazz club on Mars who acts as a surrogate mother to Spike.
- Mason Alexander Park as Gren: A jazz musician working for Ana, who is also Ana's right-hand. The character was reimagined as non-binary for the show.
- Ira Munn and Lucy Currey as Punch and Judy: The duo hosts of Big Shot, a bounty hunter public program.
- Geoff Stults as Chalmers: A detective in the Intra Solar System Police (ISSP) who is married to Jet's ex-wife.
- Carmel McGlone as Woodcock: Jet's informant.
- Rachel House as Mao: A crime boss who leads the Syndicate's "White Tigers" family.
- Ann Truong and Hoa Xuande as Shin and Lin: Twin siblings employed as Vicious' enforcers.
- John Noble as Caliban: One of the three Elders who control the Red Dragon Crime Syndicate.

=== Guest ===
- Eden Perkins as Radical Ed: A hyperactive child prodigy skilled in hacking.
- Jan Uddin and Lydia Peckham as Asimov and Katerina Solensan: A romantic couple on the run from the law hoping for a big score to secure their future.
- Cali Nelle as Abdul Hakim: A thief and killer who uses a "face-changer" to hide his true appearance.
- Nathaniel Lees as the Sushi Chef: Spike's informant.
- Adrienne Barbeau as Maria Murdock: An eco-fascist mastermind who will go to extremes to protect nature.
- Matthias Luafutu as Udai Taxim: A fugitive connected to Jet's past career as a detective.
- Wade Williams as Fad: Jet's ex-partner in the ISSP.
- Jade Harlow as Mel: A mechanic hired by Jet to repair the Bebop and its aging engine, who has a brief romantic fling with Faye.
- Sinead Fitzgerald as Holo-Beatrice: A computer generated receptionist who is the face of The Londes Centre
- Josh Randall as Pierrot Le Fou: An assassin whose sanity was damaged from intensive scientific experimentation, leaving him with the mindset of a sadistic child.
- Rodney Cook as the voice of the Teddy Bomber: A terrorist who uses explosive teddy bears to rebel against the government and what he views as a corrupt capitalist society.
- Christine Dunford as Whitney Haggis Matsumoto: A con artist posing as Faye's "mother", who found her while she was still in cryo-sleep. The character was originally male in the anime.
- Tyson Ritter as The Iron Mink: A notorious intergalactic arms dealer who is secretly married to Whitney.
- James Hiroyuki Liao as Tanaka

Additionally, Blessing Mokgohloa portrays Santiago and Molly Moriarty plays Kimmie Black, Jet's daughter.

== Episodes ==
No.	Title	Directed by	Written by	Original release date
1	"Session #1: Cowboy·Gospel"	Alex García López	Teleplay by : Christopher Yost	November 19, 2021
In the year 2071, bounty hunters Spike Spiegel and Jet Black thwart an attempted casino heist, leading to a gunfight that severely damages the casino and results in the ISSP deducting the high cost of repairs from the heist crew's bounty. Furious at the botched job leaving them with less money than they had before, Jet picks up a new bounty: hunting down Asimov Solensan and his woman, Katerina, who were last seen heading to New Tijuana to sell a stolen stash of "Red Eye", a lethal sensory-enhancement drug. The pair are also pursued by Spike's old gang, the Red Dragon Crime Syndicate, and rival bounty hunter Faye Valentine, who has been hired by Katerina's abusive father to return her. Ultimately, Asimov is mortally wounded by a bullet from Faye, and Katarina, unwilling to go back to her father, chooses to commit suicide by flying straight at the police while a distraught Spike watches. A surviving Syndicate gunman reports to his boss, Vicious, who kills him after learning of Spike's involvement and orders him to be hunted down.
2	"Session #2: Venus·Pop"	Alex García López	Sean Cummings	November 19, 2021
While tracking down a terrorist known as the "Teddy Bomber" on Venus, Spike survives an attempt on his life by a Syndicate assassin. Pretending to want noodles, Spike secretly visits Ana, a club owner who raised him as a boy and assumed he was dead, for information. Ana warns him that he needs to reveal his past as a Syndicate hitman to Jet (a former cop) and also informs him that Julia, the woman he once loved, is now married to Vicious. The Elders, who run the Syndicate, discover that Vicious has been dealing Red Eye without permission and force him to take part in a mock execution of Julia as punishment. Julia calls her husband a weak man for not standing up to the Elders, and he violently chokes her and throws her to the ground. Jet and Spike locate Bomber and subdue him while also keeping a bomb from going off; Spike volunteers to stay behind until Jet can collect the bounty. Ana discreetly eavesdrops on Vicious being told by his enforcers, Shin and Lin, that his assassin Gunther is dead at Spike's hand.
3	"Session #3: Dog·Star·Swing"	Michael Katleman	Story by : Christopher Yost; Teleplay by : Christopher Yost & Sean Cummings	November 19, 2021
On Mars, Spike and Jet hunt down a serial murderer, Abdul Hakim, while Jet tries to find an expensive talking doll for his daughter Kimmie's birthday. During their investigation, they discover that Hakim, a refugee from Earth, killed his victims (all of whom were wealthy refugees) because he blamed them for leaving him and his parents to die so they could take their pets with them instead. He stole the dogs to kill them, but ultimately could not bring himself to pull the trigger. Spike and Jet talk Hakim into surrendering, but ISSP officers then shoot him dead to avoid having to pay his bounty. When the doll is accidentally destroyed, Jet instead gives Kimmie one of the dogs, a Pembroke Welsh Corgi named Ein; his ex-wife refuses the gift and forces him to take it back due to heavy luxury taxes on pets. Meanwhile, Spike, having located Vicious' drug factory on Mars, sends his enemy a message by firing a sniper rifle into the bulletproof window of his car.
4	"Session #4: Callisto·Soul"	Michael Katleman	Vivian Lee	November 19, 2021
While visiting the opera on Ganymede to find a lead on the con artist who cryo-scammed her, Faye encounters an eco-terrorist group, the Callisto Liberation Front, that threatens an industrial corporation to stop their terraforming activities, but inadvertently kills the corporation's CEO with a bioweapon that turns people into trees. Spike, Jet, and Faye team up to stop the group on Callisto from launching missiles carrying the bioweapon onto Ganymede's surface. While Spike and Jet stop the missile launch, Faye chases after the group's leader, Maria Murdock, but goes off-course when she receives a call from Whitney Haggis Matsumoto, her scammer. When Murdock launches her final missile, this time towards Callisto, Faye has a change of heart and sacrifices her ship to destroy the missile, saving Spike and Jet. Faced with the prospect of going to prison, Murdock's daughter Harrison uses the bioweapon to kill herself and her mother. Spike and Jet rescue Faye and invite her to join the Bebop's crew. Julia asks Ana to set up a meeting with Mao, a Syndicate Capo.
5	"Session #5: Darkside Tango"	Alex García López	Liz Sagal	November 19, 2021
Five years prior to meeting Spike, Jet, then a senior detective with the ISSP, and his partner Fad go after Udai Taxim, a Syndicate associate, hoping to learn the name of the dirty ISSP cop he's working with. Jet gets the drop on Udai, only to be shot several times and left for dead. He survives, but is subsequently framed as the dirty cop and serves five years in prison. In the present, the Bebop crew learns that a prison ship from Pluto crashed and dozens of inmates escaped, including Udai. Jet leaves Spike and Faye to pursue the other bounties (although they wind up spending the rest of the day bonding with each other instead of working), while he and Fad reunite to find Udai. Jet finally catches up to him, but Fad kills him and reveals that he was the real dirty cop. Jet kills him in self-defense despite knowing that he will never be able to fully clear his name, and leaves before the police arrive.
6	"Session #6: Binary·Two-Step"	Michael Katleman	Karl Taro Greenfeld	November 19, 2021
Jet learns from his mechanic, Mel, that the Bebop needs a new engine part. One of Jet's informants, Radical Ed, sends him information on "Cy-Baba", a legendary bounty that Ed has managed to identify as Dr. Londes, the owner of a clinic devoted to "freeing the mind"; Spike investigates and quickly falls into Londes' trap, getting ensnared in a virtual reality simulation where Julia tries to convince him to give up on her while Londes consumes his mind. Cy-Baba's creator, Dr. Kayback, reveals that the only way to kill Londes, who is really a powerful AI that has become self-aware and psychotic, is to destroy its mainframe on Earth. Mel patches up the Bebop's engines and they reach the mainframe, but find it to be impenetrable. Faye uses her new railgun to pierce the mainframe, saving Spike's life. Mel departs after urging Faye to continue searching for "who she really is". Spike quietly holds a picture of him and Julia, admitting to himself that he will never let go of his feelings for her.
7	"Session #7: Galileo·Hustle"	Alex García López	Alexandra E. Hartman	November 19, 2021
Whitney pays Faye a visit and offers her a job in Santo City in exchange for her identikit. Posing as Faye's mother, she convinces Jet to launch the Bebop for the job. Upon their arrival, Spike and Jet identify Whitney as a wanted con artist, but they encounter the arms dealer Iron Mink, who threatens them to surrender the Bebop for their lives. Using the tracking beacon in Whitney's ring, Spike and Jet roam around the city to lure Iron Mink while Faye and Whitney go retrieve Faye's identikit. Upon their arrival at a storage warehouse, Faye discovers her identikit in the form of a VHS tape before she and Whitney are cornered by Iron Mink, but Whitney uses a safe word to spare their lives. As Whitney and Iron Mink kiss, Faye bails out with Whitney's ship. Meanwhile, Vicious lays down his plans with Mao and Santiago to overthrow the Elders from the Syndicate, but Julia later gives Mao a bigger offer to betray Vicious. Back aboard the Bebop, Jet plays the tape, revealing a home video of young Faye.
8	"Session #8: Sad·Clown·A-Go-Go"	Alex García López	Javier Grillo-Marxuach	November 19, 2021
Vicious storms into a medical compound to release Pierrot LeFou, a genetically enhanced but insane assassin that hates dogs, and hires him to kill Spike in exchange for an unlimited supply of Red Eye. LeFou ambushes and seriously injures Spike, but the sight of Ein stops him before the Bebop gang escapes. As Spike recuperates, Jet learns from Woodcock that Spike is hiding secrets from him. LeFou hacks into Ein's neural system to send a message to Spike to meet him at Earthland, an abandoned amusement park asteroid. Meanwhile, Vicious has Santiago beheaded and kills Mao before single-handedly taking down the Elders to take over the Syndicate. The Bebop arrives near Earthland, but Spike disables the ship to prevent Jet and Faye from interfering with his fight. Spike confronts LeFou and distracts him with a toy dog before stabbing him in the thigh with a throwing knife, causing the assassin to cry before Spike sends him flying to space.
9	"Session #9: Blue·Crow·Waltz"	Michael Katleman	Jennifer Johnson	November 19, 2021
Prior to the current timeline, Spike and Vicious are underlings of the Syndicate Capo Stax, who assigns the duo to a job negotiating with the Neptune Cartel, but tells Spike to keep an eye on Vicious, who is the son of an Elder. When the main act at Ana's is unable to perform, Julia takes center stage, instantly captivating Vicious and becoming the club's headliner. Vicious botches the Neptune deal, leading to him straining his relationship with Julia and her getting closer to Spike. After Vicious is marked for impulsively murdering a Neptune thug, Spike is ordered to execute him, but feeling indebted to Vicious, Spike goes on to wipe out the Neptune Cartel instead. He then tells Julia he is leaving the Syndicate life and wants to take Julia with him, but his plans are foiled when Vicious' gang ambush and gun him down, sending him falling into a river presumed dead.
10	"Session #10: Supernova Symphony"	Michael Katleman	Christopher Yost	November 19, 2021
Vicious kidnaps Kimmie, holding her hostage at an abandoned church. Jet and Faye learn that, in order to rescue Kimmie, they would have to exchange Spike for her. A reluctant Spike agrees. After a fight in the church, Vicious duels Spike, and the fight ends when Julia betrays Spike by shooting him, causing Spike to fall from the church's stained glass window, and imprisoning Vicious. Jet reunites with Kimmie, later abandoning Spike for putting her life in danger. Faye leaves as well to look for answers about her past life. A battered Spike is later met by a child hacker named "Radical Ed", who offers him a bounty to catch Vincent Volaju, the "Butterfly Man".

== Production ==
=== Development ===
On June 6, 2017, it was announced that an American live action adaptation of Cowboy Bebop was being developed for television by Tomorrow Studios—a partnership between Marty Adelstein and ITV Studios, alongside Sunrise Inc., which also produced the original anime—with Christopher Yost as the series writer. On November 27, 2018, Netflix announced that the live action series would be heading to its streaming service. One of the Tomorrow Studios' producers, André Nemec, was appointed as the showrunner who previously discovered the anime through his brother around 2011. In an interview with Vanity Fair on October 26, 2021, Yost said he had already started planning a second season for the series before writing the first season, which is something Nemec also hinted at. However, on December 9, 2021, Netflix canceled the series after one season.

=== Casting ===
On April 4, 2019, Variety reported that John Cho, Mustafa Shakir, Daniella Pineda and Alex Hassell were cast in lead roles as Spike Spiegel, Jet Black, Faye Valentine and Vicious in the series. On August 22, 2019, it was announced that Elena Satine was cast as Julia. On November 19, 2020, Deadline Hollywood reported that Geoff Stults, Tamara Tunie, Mason Alexander Park, Rachel House, Ann Truong and Hoa Xuande have been cast as Chalmers, Ana, Gren, Mao, Shin and Lin. James Hiroyuki Liao had joined the cast by August 2021, along with Blessing Mokgohloa as Santiago and Molly Moriarty as Kimmie Black. On September 25, 2021, Jan Uddin and Lydia Peckham, Adrienne Barbeau, Josh Randall, Rodney Cook, and Ira Munn and Lucy Currey were officially cast as Asimov and Katerina Solensan, Maria Murdock, Pierrot Le Fou, Teddy Bomber, and Punch and Judy. Cali Nelle was also confirmed to play Abdul Hakim.

When Cho came across the project, he remarked about the anime, "It's really interesting and smart and funny... All the characters are coming from places of loss, and there are a lot of defense mechanisms to deal with that sense of loss that informs the whole show." He continued, "I investigated the anime and just thought this was the most unique piece of entertainment I had seen in a long time: the combination of genres, characters, the music." He later called Aneesh Chaganty, his director on Searching (2018), to talk about the project. Cho remembered that Chaganty encouraged him saying, "You have to do it."

On October 27, 2021, in an interview with SyFy Wire, Nemec explained he purposely cast older actors and defended his choice that it would build richer stories for the characters, saying, "I think that really became clear to me that to really feel for these characters, to really want to track and live with them, they needed real depth of life experience in their soul. And that was something that John brought. I can't imagine anyone being Spike Spiegel but John Cho because John brings a depth to the character. He's incredibly facile with humor. He's quick-witted. He can be laconic like Spike Spiegel. I think the anime had true moments of ennui, and true moments of dramatic pain that really did require someone, again, with that depth that John brought. While in the anime, it's okay to sort of play the younger version. But in today's world and in live action, the actor needed to be able to bring that essence as well. And that just required a more mature actor."

Several of the original Japanese voice actors from the anime were involved in the live-action adaption, reprising their roles for the Japanese dub of the show. The Japanese voice actor for Spike, Kōichi Yamadera said, "I have long anticipated a live action version. I can feel the strong respect it has toward the anime. I hope that viewers will see the atmosphere of the Spike character that I previously portrayed in John Cho's performance, who is skillfully taking on the role in this version. There are also many settings and developments that can only be pulled off in a live action series. I hope that both people who love Cowboy Bebop and those who are new to the title can enjoy this new series!"

The casting of newcomer Eden Perkins as Radical Ed was announced on the day of the series' release to Netflix, though only appears in the final scenes of the tenth episode. According to Nemec, "To keep the mystery around the character was to not necessarily want to promise that this was going to be a season that was inclusive of Ed, to not necessarily put something that many may find is disappointing out into the world. But in fairness, Ed doesn't show up in the anime until many episodes in, maybe about a third of the way through the entire series. So, it felt fair to also keep Ed from showing up [in live-action]."

=== Pre-production ===
Nemec and the writers also looked beyond the source material to the movies that influenced the original anime director, Shinichirō Watanabe, when he devoted the anime with studio Sunrise in the 1990s. To bring Cowboy Bebop to the reality of cinema, the Netflix team drew inspiration from such films as The Big Sleep (1946), The Good, the Bad and the Ugly (1966), Bonnie and Clyde (1967), 2001: A Space Odyssey (1968), Dirty Harry (1971), Lethal Weapon (1987), and The Crow (1994). "We put a pretty extensive and expansive list together, and we spent a lot of time really looking at the inspirations", Nemec said. The showrunner did not watch much other anime or even live-action anime adaptations in preparation for the show.

Nemec also said that while it was important to be faithful to source material, they wanted to craft their own story—that "there were so many things that work [in the anime], but at the same time, not wanting to do a one-to-one translation because I wanted to be served, if I were a fan, a different meal."

Regarding Faye Valentine's wardrobe changes, Pineda said: "You know, we tried with the original. But in the original outfit, which is so lovely, it's hard to hide stunt pads and gel pads and back plates and things you need when you're falling and kicking and doing stunts." She worked with head of costume design Jane Holland to design a functioning outfit for the live-action character. Holland said: "... As a woman, I felt resistant to the idea of the lead female character being gratuitous or overtly sexualized. It's not about it not being revealing, it's not about any of that, it's actually got all of those elements. But my take on it is that it's designed by a woman and it was made by a lot of women, and it's worn by a woman. So the same elements are there but they have just manifested in a different way." She also explained it would be easier for Pineda to work in this outfit than if she were dressed how Faye was in the anime: "It's definitely aesthetically driven but there's a practical element as well...There's a lot of action. we filmed over a long period of time through different seasons. We had a lot of night shifts in Oakland so Jet and Spike were fine, because they had practical, much more practical clothing, in the anime. [Pineda] needed that as well."

The cast initially trained with stunt team 87eleven Action Design, then with New Zealander stunt coordinator Allan Poppleton of Cunning Stunts.

=== Filming ===
Filming took place in 185 locations around Auckland, New Zealand, between July 2019 and March 2021, including the Bastion Point Reserve, Auckland War Memorial, Auckland Harbour Cloud, the former Auckland Railway Station, Ardmore Airport, St Matthew's Church, Spark Arena, Waitawa Regional Park, Karangahape Road and Kingsland railway station. 150 locals were involved in the art and construction teams. According to production manager Clayton Tikao, Auckland was picked since its urban environment fitted the series' "grottier" aesthetic.

In October 2019, Cho sustained a knee injury, setting back production by about eight months. The delay gave the showrunners extra time to bring some of the planned second-season elements into the first season, such as introducing characters and casting them, including Mason Alexander Park as Gren, who originally was introduced in the series' thirteenth episode.

On April 17, 2020, it was revealed that episodes would be one hour in length, allowing more in-depth storytelling; and that second-season scripting had already begun to be explored. On May 19, in an interview with SyFy Wire, Adelstein revealed that three episodes had already been completed, and that they had shot at least six before Cho's knee injury. He also said that the anime series' director, Shinichirō Watanabe, would be involved as a creative consultant. Watanabe later said in November 2019: "I read the initial concept and provided my opinions, but I'm not sure if they will be reflected in the final product. I have no choice but to pray and hope that it will turn out good. Also, for Cowboy Bebop, I don't have any right to stop it. Those rights are in the hands of Sunrise, so if you have a complaint, please send it to them." In October 2021, Entertainment Weekly confirmed that Watanabe had served as a consultant for the series, providing early Cowboy Bebop concept art for reference. Sunrise provided original character concept drawings, ships, props, sets, and locations as references. Watanabe said: "For me, it's a great surprise and honor that the Cowboy Bebop universe has thrived for over 20 years and will continue onward." When Nemec has subsequently been asked about Watanabe in interviews, he has mentioned only the Sunrise staff.

Production resumed on September 30, 2020, when the New Zealand government gave the green light to continue following the nation's COVID-19 shutdown. Filming officially wrapped on March 15, 2021. In August 2021, it was revealed that original show creator Hajime Yatate, actually a pseudonym for the collective Sunrise animation staff, was interested in writing episodes.

Elena Satine, who played Julia, was pregnant during filming.

=== Music ===
Yoko Kanno composed the series' music, while "Tank!", the original anime series' opening theme, was used in the opening credits. In an August 2021 interview with Vulture magazine, Cho talked about accepting his role and Kanno's involvement with the live action adaptation: "I made sure that she was locked in before saying yes. I didn't think the show should go forward without her involvement. [She is] too integral to the show. Our iteration minus her would suffer too much." On September 8, 2021, Nemec said in a Polygon interview: "Yoko's involvement in this show to me was paramount to almost everything else."

== Release ==
A first look video, from the point-of-view of Ein, was released by Netflix in October 2019. Set to music from the original series, the clip showed off some of the sets and the main cast, with the trademark sign-off phrase "See You Space Cowboy..." appearing at the end. Netflix resumed the show's marketing campaign in June 2021 with a new teaser set to the original show's opening theme, "Tank!", to announce that Kanno would be scoring the series after having previously provided the soundtrack for the 1998 anime. In August 2021, along with the reveal of a November release date, Netflix released first-look preview images for the show, including pictures of Spike, Jet, Faye and Ein in various environments recreated from the anime, including the Bebop spaceship and the cathedral where Vicious and Spike had their first confrontation. During Netflix's TUDUM event, they revealed the show's opening credits which replicate the anime's opening incorporating "Tank!" and including live action recreations of the original. It took 3 days to film.

A special standalone teaser called "The Lost Session", shot separately from and not including any footage from the actual show, was released by Netflix on October 19, 2021, in anticipation for the trailer release. Directed by Greg Jardin, the short featured Cho, Shakir, and Pineda as their respective characters. The first official trailer was released by Netflix on October 26, 2021.

The series was originally slated to release in 2020, but was delayed due to Cho's injury and the COVID-19 pandemic. It was released on November 19, 2021.

The series was canceled after one season on December 9, 2021, less than three weeks after its release. According to insiders, Netflix's renewal rate for a scripted series is at 60 percent and their decision is based on balancing the show's viewership and cost. Although Cowboy Bebop was on Netflix's Top 10 with almost 74 million viewing hours worldwide since its debut, viewership dropped by 59 percent the following week from November 29, 2021, to December 5, 2021.

=== Season 2 storylines ===
In The Bebop Beat podcast interview, showrunner André Nemec discussed what would have happened during a second season, including the reveal of the Cosmonaut; Ed finding out the true meaning of family; Jet's mechanical arm tripping out (while Jet is tripping out, his arm is unusable and plays the saxophone with one hand); Spike's demons of the Blue Crow massacre being put to bed; Faye finding out who she is; Julia discovering "Heavy Is the Head That Wears the Crown"; Vicious being reborn; and Ein saving the day.

== Reception ==
=== Critical response ===
Critical response to the series was described as "mixed" (Note: Various sources describing the response as "mixed" or "divisive":) and "negative". (Note: Attributed to multiple references:) On review aggregator Rotten Tomatoes, the series has an approval rating of 45% based on 87 critics. The website's critics consensus reads, "Maybe next time, Space Cowboy – this live-action Bebop has a fun enough crew to spend time with, but it disappointingly replaces the soulfulness of the source material with kitsch." According to Metacritic, which calculated an average score of 47 out of 100 from 28 reviews, the series received "mixed or average reviews".

Total Film's Bradley Russell gave the series four stars out of five, stating that the show is "overflowing with charm, personality, and style – becoming a worthy companion piece to the original series". Matt Kim of IGN felt that the show "whole-heartedly embraces its source material and succeeds more often than it fails." Rolling Stone's Alan Sepinwall described the series as "a hangout show as much as it is a thriller, a space opera, and so on", ultimately giving it three-and-a-half stars out of five. Nina Metz of the Chicago Tribune felt that "if you're able to watch [the series] with eyes unencumbered by comparisons, it's a hoot".

Many reviewers felt the series did not live up to the original series. Kambole Campbell of Empire gave Cowboy Bebop two stars out of five, declaring it "a hollow re-enactment" of the anime. Entertainment Weekly's Christian Holub described the series as "a lot less embarrassing" than previous live-action anime adaptations, while also noting that "it still doesn't quite live up to the power of the original series". Mike Hale of The New York Times also said the show can't live up to the original because of its "resolute ordinariness". Maureen Ryan of Vanity Fair however said that "This version of Cowboy Bebop, in many ways, improves on the original."

The series was widely criticized for its writing and pacing. Cecilia D'Anastasio writing in Wired described the writing as "corny" with "muddled subplots". Russell felt that many of the supporting characters' motivations were "glossed over and occasionally undercooked", while "a handful of episodes feel rushed to meet its runtime". He also noted that the Vicious–Julia subplot was "by far the weakest element" of the show". Several reviewers noted how the increased episode length did not translate into better episodes, but instead bloat. Judy Berman writing in Time magazine called the decision to expand the show from 25 minutes to an hour "baffling". Variety's Caroline Framke opined that the series suffered from "Netflix bloat", where the story is "stretched past [its] limits seemingly for the sake of retaining eyeballs for more minutes at a time." Rob Owen of the Pittsburgh Tribune-Review wrote, "When the show leans more heavily into Spike's serialized plot – Cowboy Bebop loses its sense of fun and bogs down in tired soap operatics."

The show's visual aesthetic divided critics. Rohan Naaha of The Indian Express wrote that the show "apes only the most obvious aspects of the cartoon – the aesthetic. But funnily enough, it never comes across as a show that is mimicking Westerns or noir films; it comes across as a show that is mimicking another show's impression of what Westerns and noir films are." He criticized the excessive use of dutch angles. D'Anastasio was critical of the sets and described them as "cheap-looking". Russell, meanwhile, noted that "some sets clearly need a more sizeable budget, but the sheer attention to detail by the production designers helps overcome that handicap". Graeme Virtue of The Guardian described the show as a "visually amped-up space western that feels stylised and swaggering to near saturation". Sepinwall wrote, "The visual palette is a blend of high and low elements, blending modern special effects with Fifties-style green screen in a way that looks simultaneously primitive and cool, so even the sequences that seem cheap pop off the screen in appealing ways." Conversely, The Hollywood Reporter's Angie Han described the show as "a knockoff Firefly, made for a fraction of the budget", with "muddy CG" and "shoddy-looking sets". Hale compared the show's visual effects to Doctor Who, calling them adequate but cheesy.

Several reviewers also criticized the action scenes for their cinematography, editing and fight choreography. However, Brian Lowry of CNN described the action sequences in the series "stylishly choreographed" despite the fact that the overall series was lacking and dull.

The performances of the cast received praise. Naaha described the cast as the "only saving grace" of the series in an otherwise critical review. Francisco stated, "If there's a high mark the show hits, it's the fact that its all-star main cast was successfully assembled to begin with." Shirley Li of The Atlantic wrote, "The trio of protagonists aboard the Bebop have an electric chemistry: The actor John Cho embodies Spike's swagger, Mustafa Shakir captures Jet's stoicism, and Daniella Pineda suffuses Faye with endearing candor." GameSpot's Mason Downey wrote, "absolutely everyone feels perfectly cast".

=== Audience reaction ===
The cancellation of the series garnered mixed reactions from fans. However, this also prompted a petition called "Save the live action Cowboy Bebop", with author Wesley Chu tweeting a link after comparing the show to Firefly. The petition gained over 150,000 signatures including Steve Blum, the English voice actor for Spike in the anime.

=== Original series director response ===
When asked what he thought of the live-action adaptation, Watanabe responded, "For the new Netflix live-action adaptation, they sent me a video to review and check. It started with a scene in a casino, which made it very tough for me to continue. I stopped there and so only saw that opening scene. It was clearly not Cowboy Bebop and I realized at that point that if I wasn't involved, it would not be Cowboy Bebop. I felt that maybe I should have done this. Although the value of the original anime is somehow far higher now."

=== Awards and nominations ===
The series was nominated for Outstanding Main Title Design at the 74th Primetime Creative Arts Emmy Awards in 2022.

== Other media ==
In August 2021, it was announced that Netflix had partnered with Titan Books to publish several books based on the series, with the first book, a prequel novel entitled Cowboy Bebop: A Syndicate Story: Red Planet Requiem, released on December 7, 2021. An art book, Cowboy Bebop: Making The Netflix Series, which has concept art, behind-the-scenes photography, and cast and crew interviews, was released on June 21, 2022.

Titan also published a four-issue comic miniseries based on the show from January 26 to June 22, 2022, with a trade collecting all four issues released on November 15, as Cowboy Bebop: Supernova Swing. The story is by Dan Watters and art by Lamar Mathurin. First issue art cover is by Artgerm (Stanley Lau) with variant covers by Claudia Ianniciello, Afu Chan, and Yishan Li. The following issues continued to have different cover artists.
