= Elena Satine =

Georgian-American actress and singer (born 1987)

- ელენა სატინი
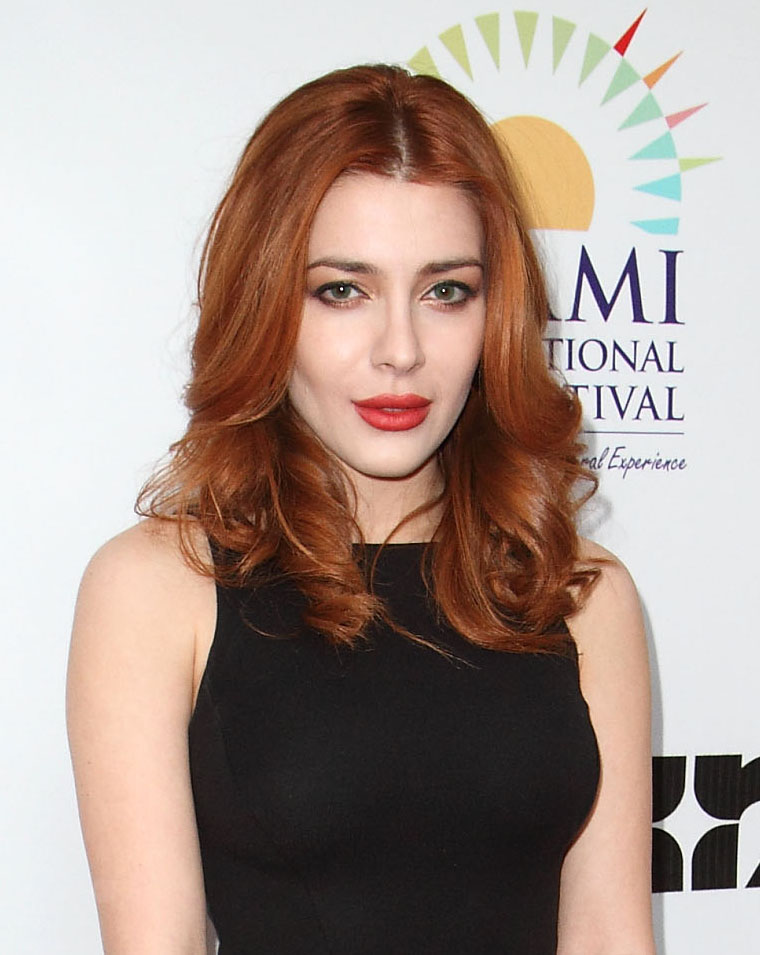
- Satine at the 2012 Miami International Film Festival premiere of the TV series Magic City
- Born: November 24, 1987 (age 38); Tbilisi, Georgian SSR, USSR
- Education: Moscow Art Theatre School
- Occupation: Actress
- Years active: 2008–present
- Spouse: Tyson Ritter (m. 2013)
- Children: 1

Elena Satine (Georgian: ელენა სატინი; born November 24, 1987) is a Georgian-American actress and singer. On television, she has been featured as a series regular on the Starz period drama Magic City (2012–2013), the ABC drama Revenge (2014–2015), and the Netflix space Western Cowboy Bebop (2021). She has also made appearances on superhero-themed series, portraying Mera on Smallville (2010), Lorelei on Agents of S.H.I.E.L.D. (2014), and Sonya Simonson / Dreamer on The Gifted (2017).

== Early life ==
Satine was born in Tbilisi, capital of what was then the Georgian Soviet Socialist Republic (current Georgia). Her mother was an opera singer and her father worked in the textile industry. At the age of five, Satine and her family moved to Sochi, and she became a part of the Georgian pop group Nergebi, a Mickey Mouse Club-like ensemble of child performers. She toured with Nergebi throughout Eastern Europe, including an appearance on children's variety show Utrennaya Zvezda (Morning Star) and later branched off into a solo career. At age 9, Satine became the youngest performer to headline at the Kinotavr Festival.

In 1998, while accompanying her mother on a business trip, Satine snuck away to audition for Professional Performing Arts School, and earned her admission on the spot. After convincing her parents to let her study in the United States, Satine moved to New York, and graduated from PPAS at age 16. Afterwards she continued her dramatic studies at the Moscow Art Theatre School in Russia earning a Diploma of Specialist in Acting Art. She also engaged in several fellowships at the Royal Academy of Dramatic Arts.

== Career ==
Satine's television debut was in an episode of Cold Case, playing an immigrant Russian singer. She has since appeared on TV shows including Gemini Division, CW's Melrose Place, and the season 10 Smallville episode "Patriot", in which she played Mera, the wife of Aquaman. She also appeared on ITV's Poirot, in a 2010 episode that adapted Murder on the Orient Express.

Satine was for two years part of the main cast of the Starz series Magic City. The producers tailored the role of Judi Silver for Satine following her audition to play another part. Satine appeared on a 2014 episode of ABC's Agents of S.H.I.E.L.D. playing Lorelei, a villainous Asgardian. She followed with another role in the same network, Louise Ellis in Revenge. Initially a recurring guest, Satine wound up promoted to the main cast eleven episodes into the season.

In 2017 she appeared in two episodes of Twin Peaks, and played Sonya in the Fox television series The Gifted.

In August 2019, Satine was cast as Julia in the live-action adaptation of the Cowboy Bebop series.

== Personal life ==
Satine and Tyson Ritter, lead singer and bassist of the band The All-American Rejects, became engaged in April 2013 and married on December 31, 2013. They have a son.

== Filmography ==
=== Film ===
Year	Title	Role	Notes
2009	Don't Look Up	Anca	
2009	The Harsh Life of Veronica Lambert	Penelope	
2009	Adventures in Online Dating	Christine	Short film
2015	A Beautiful Now	Jaki	
2015	Zipper	Ellie Green	
2016	Outlaw	Elena	

=== Television ===
Year	Title	Role	Notes
2008	Gemini Division	Nadia	Episode: "Training Day"
2008	Cold Case	Nadia Koslov (1989)	Episode: "Triple Threat"
2009	Melrose Place	Abby Douglas	Episode: "Vine"
2010	Agatha Christie's Poirot	Countess Andrenyi	Episode: "Murder on the Orient Express"
2010	Smallville	Mera	Episode: "Patriot"
2011	NCIS	Adriana Gorgova	Episode: "Defiance"
2012–2013	Magic City	Judi Silver	Main role; 14 episodes
2013	The Sixth Gun	Missy Hume	Unaired pilot
2014	Agents of S.H.I.E.L.D.	Lorelei	Episodes: "T.A.H.I.T.I.", "Yes Men"
2014	Matador	Margot	3 episodes
2014–2015	Revenge	Louise Ellis	Main role (season 4); 22 episodes
2016	Timeless	Judith Campbell	Episode: "Atomic City"
2017	Twin Peaks	Rhonda	Episodes: "Part 5", "Part 7"
2017	24: Legacy	Juliana Mehmeti	Episode: "Day 10: 8:00pm - 9:00pm"
2017	The Gifted	Sonya Simonson / Dreamer	Recurring role; 9 episodes
2018	Strange Angel	Maggie Donovan	Recurring role
2021	Cowboy Bebop	Julia	Main role

=== Web series ===
Year	Title	Role	Notes
2009	Spartacus: Blood and Sand – Motion Comic	Ilithyia	Voice role; episode: "Upon the Sands of Vengeance"

=== Music video ===
Year	Artist	Song	Role
2015	Chris Cornell	"Nearly Forgot My Broken Heart"	Enchantress
