= Mai Yamane =

Japanese singer (born 1958)

- Born: Yamane Michiko (山根 美知子); 9 October 1958 (age 68); Izumo, Shimane, Japan
- Occupations: Singer, lyricist
- Musical career
- Genre: J-pop
- Instruments: Vocals; piano
- Years active: 1979–present

Mai Yamane (山根 麻以, Yamane Mai; born 9 October 1958) is a Japanese singer, known for her work on the soundtracks of Cowboy Bebop and other anime with Yoko Kanno and for her 1980s and 90s music, including Tasogare.

== Early life and solo career ==
Her career started in 1979 when she participated and won the prize in Yamaha Music Foundation's Cocky Pop, a contest for young singers in Japan. Leading from that she debuted in 1979 with the single Gozen Reiji (午前０時), written and composed by Yoko Shibata. A year later she released her first album, Tasogare (1980). She followed with albums like The Day Before Yesterday (1984), Flying Elephants (1985), Embassy (1986), Woman Tone (1988) and 1958 (1989). She also collaborated with many artists, e.g. in 1993 she worked on project Yamane Mai Kubota Haruo Unit with Haruo Kubota. The same year she began working with Yoko Kanno on anime soundtracks. In 1997 she moved from Tokyo to near Mount Fuji and became an independent musician.

== Later career ==
In 1995 she started playing with New Archaic Smile (NAS), a Japanese band where Mai Yamane was a vocalist. The rest of the band was Mai's sister Eiko Yamane (who also was the vocalist in UGUISS), brother Satoru Yamane and the Sano brothers Satoshi and Atsushi. In 1997 the Futsuu no Uta single was born in collaboration with June Chiki Chikuma. Yamane recorded 3 more albums with New Archaic Smile: Kin no Himo in 2001, Yasashii kimochi in 2003 and Yakitori no uta in 2004.

Yamane has continuously held concerts, such as in 2000 at the Inochi no Matsuri ("Festival of Life") in Nagano, a 2002 Paris concert, at a Global Village event during Expo 2005 in Aichi, and in 2007 at Seoul as a member of the Yoko Kanno team. In 2001 she changed her name from 山根 麻衣 (Yamane Mai) to 山根 麻以 (Yamane Mai). In 2011 she adopted the artist name a-sha (アーシャ) and began hosting sessions for workshops and healing.

In 2017, her song "Tasogare" gained attention as city pop gained renewed interest, and the song was sampled by western future funk artists and others. In 2019, producer Pierre Bourne and hip hop artists Young Nudy and Playboi Carti used a sample of the song on their unreleased track "Pissy Pamper". A leaked version of the song topped the Spotify US Viral 50 chart before being taken down. The song was ultimately never released due to failure to clear the rights for use of the sample.

== Discography ==
=== Singles ===
- "Gozen Reiji" (1979)
- "Last Night" (ラスト・ナイト) (1979)
- "Foolin My Self"
- "The 21' (Live To Be Wild)" (1981)
- "Kibun Wa Fairness" (気分はフェアネス) (1982) (Oricon number 47)
- "Little Child" (リトル・チャイルド) (1983)
- "Tasogare Ni Sayonara (Good-By Twilight)" (黄昏にさようなら (Good-By Twilight)) (1984)
- "Yuuwaku sarete coup d'etat" (誘惑されてクーデター) (1985)
- "Beating" (1989)
- "Suna Ni Kieta Namida" (砂に消えた涙) (1989)
- "Invisible Love" (1996)

=== Albums ===
- Tasogare (1980)
- Sorry (1981)
- Will (1982)
- The Day Before Yesterday (1984)
- 月光浴 (1984)
- Flying Elephants (1985)
- Embassy (1986)
- Best (1987)
- Woman Tone (1988)
- 1958 (1989)
- Mai Yamane and Haruo Kubota Unit (1993)
- Mai Yamane with New Archaic Smile (1997)
- Kin no Himo (2001)
- Yasashi kimochi w/New Archaic Smile (2003)
- Mai Yamane the Celebrations, Inori no uta (2004)
- Mai Yamane and Visions, Bird of Paradise (2007)
- Kimi-wo-aishiteru Kagayaki-no-oto (2007)
- A-sha Freedoms (2 song special release, 2012)

=== Vocals (anime) ===
Cowboy Bebop (1997 anime) OST:

- "Want It All Back"
- "Pushing The Sky"
- "Rain" (Demo version)
- "Don't Bother None"
- "See You Space Cowboy"
- "Mushroom Hunting" (Live version)
- "Blue"
- "The Real Folk Blues"
- "Gotta Knock a Little Harder"

Black Jack OST:

- "Invisible Love" (Starting & ending song)

Mirage of Blaze OST:

- "Vision of Flames "
- "Tears of Indigo"
- "Blaze"
- "Pearly Gate"
- "Insanity"
- "Chikai ~ Book of the Days"
- "Lamentation" (feat. Yoko Ueno)

Macross Plus OST:

- "After in the dark "

Vision of Escaflowne OST:

- "If You"

Darker Than BLACK OST:

- "ScatCat"
- "No One's Home"

Cowboy Bebop (2021 TV series) OST:

- "Cat Attack (Part 1)"

=== Vocals (Movies) ===
- "Bad Boyz" - The Show Must Go on (2007)
