= Jerzy Knetig =

Polish singer

Professor Jerzy Knetig (born 18 November 1950) is an opera singer and the Chair of Vocal Studies at The Fryderyk Chopin Academy of Music in Warsaw, Poland.

== Education ==
Knetig first studied engineering at the Warsaw Polytechnic, where he graduated in 1973. He then went on to study solo singing under Eugenia Szaniawska at the Secondary Music School in Warsaw, where he graduated with honours in 1977. That same year he began to take private singing lessons from Mieczyslaw Salecki and then Stanislawa Zawadzka. He finished the Academy of Music in Kraków, where he studied under Professor Helena Lazarska, with honours. In 1983/84 Knetig obtained a year's grant from the Austrian government and went to the College of Music in Vienna to improve his skills further under Kurt Egniluz.

== Performances ==
Knetig has worked with the National Philharmonic in Warsaw since 1981 and the Kraków Opera since 1982. He joined the Warsaw Chamber Opera as a soloist in 1986 and has travelled all over Europe with this group. He has sung at the festivals Wratislavia Cantans, Warsaw Autumn, Berliner Festwochen, Caryntiche Sommer, Salzburger Festspiele, The European Music Festival in Berlin and Tokyo, and the Monreale Oratory Music Festival in Palermo. He has been invited to sing in operas and oratory concerts in Europe, Japan (where he did an opera tour singing Mozart's Le nozze di Figaro in November and December 1999) and Israel. He has sung at the La Scala, the Wiener Staatsoper and the Theater an der Wien.

Knetig took part in the official inauguration concert of the "Krzysztof Penderecki year" at the Kraków Philharmonic, conducted by Jan Krentz (Beethoven's Ninth Symphony).

Knetig also performed Ave Maria and an abbreviated version of Adieu (in Session 18) for the 1998 anime Cowboy Bebop.

Knetig's repertoire includes several dozen operas (mostly Mozart), about 110 oratory parts (including both of Bach's Passions) and over 300 songs. He has also made radio performances and sound recordings, including the archival recording of all of Ignacy Jan Paderewski's songs.

== Teaching ==
In 1991 Knetig began to teach at the Academy of Music where he has his own solo singing class. He has been a professor since 1999. In 1996 Knetig also began to teach singing at the Secondary Music School in Warsaw, where he is now Deputy Director. He and his pupils produced Paisiello's full-scale opera Il due Contesse in April 1999.
