= Aoi Tada =

Japanese singer and former voice actress (born 1981)

- 多田 葵
- Born: 3 July 1981 (age 45); Tokyo, Japan
- Occupation: Singer
- Years active: 1990–2005; 2023; 2025 (voice actress); 2005–present (singer)
- Agent: Himawari Theatre Group
- Children: 1
- Musical career
- Genres: J-pop; Anison
- Instruments: Singing
- Labels: Gekidan Himawari (1990–2005); Moon-Bunny Entertainment (2005–present)
- Member of: Veil
- Website: ssp-create.com/tadaaoi/

Aoi Tada (多田葵, Tada Aoi; born 3 July 1981 in Tokyo) is a Japanese singer and former voice actress. She formerly belonged to the Gekidan Himawari theatre group. She voiced the role of Edward Wong Hau Pepelu Tivrusky IV in Cowboy Bebop and performed an insert song to the series, "Wo Qui Non Coin".

In March 2005, she signed on to Moon-Bunny Entertainment and began her singer-songwriting career. She has performed the theme songs for Gunslinger Girl: Il Teatrino and Angel Beats!. She is also affiliated with the group Veil. She is credited for her Veil-related songs as Veil ∞ Aoi.

== Discography ==
=== Singles ===
- "Doll/Human" (Released 30 January 2008)
  - Split single with Lia, theme song for the Gunslinger Girl: Il Teatrino anime TV series.
- "Shirley" (Released 9 May 2008)
- "My Soul, Your Beats! / Brave Song" (Released 26 May 2010) #3 on Oricon
  - Split single with Lia, theme song for the Angel Beats! anime TV series.
- "Bravely You / Yake Ochinai Tsubasa" (Released 26 August 2015) #4 on Oricon
  - Split single with Lia, theme song for the Charlotte anime TV series.
- "Word of Dawn" (Released 21 September 2016)
  - 2nd ending theme song for the Rewrite anime TV series.

=== Albums ===
- Nanairo no Uta (Released 7 July 2006)
- Sketchbook (Released 5 June 2009)

=== Other CDs ===
- Cowboy Bebop Original Soundtrack 3: Blue (Released 1 May 1999)
  - "Wo Qui Non Coin"
- Cowboy Bebop: Knockin' on Heaven's Door O.S.T. Future Blues (Released 29 August 2001)
  - "3.14"
- CowBoy Bebop CD Box (Released 21 June 2002)
  - "Sasurai no Cowboy"
- Digimon Tamers Best Tamers 3: Li Jianliang & Terriermon (Released 1 August 2001)
- Digimon Tamers Best Tamers 8: Li Shaochung & Lopmon (Released 28 February 2002)
- Genesis of Aquarion Original Soundtrack (Released 8 June 2005)
  - "Tori ni Natte"
- Gunslinger Girl -Il Teatrino- Vocal Album (Released 23 April 2008)
  - "Scarborough Fair"
  - "Tsuioku ~Mori to Mizu no Uta~"
- Rewrite Original Soundtrack Disc 3 (Released 28 October 2011)
  - "Watari no Uta" (Arranged by ANANT-GARDE EYES)
  - "CANOE" (Arranged by ANANT-GARDE EYES)
- YOU and ME and HER: A Love Story -Song Collection- (Released 28 August 2013)
  - "Galactic Merry-Go-Round (Hoshi no Meriigoorando)"

== Filmography ==
=== TV anime ===
- Cowboy Bebop (1998), Edward Wong Hau Pepelu Tivrusky IV
- Kindaichi Case Files (2000), Ogura Noeru
- Digimon Tamers (2000), Terriermon, Lopmon
- Digimon Ghost Game (2023) - Terriermon Assistant
- Lazarus (2025) - Elizabeth "Liz"

=== Anime films ===
- Cowboy Bebop: Knockin' on Heaven's Door (Edward Wong Hau Pepelu Tivrusky IV)
- Digimon Adventure 02: Digimon Hurricane Touchdown/Supreme Evolution! The Golden Digimentals (Gummimon)
- Digimon Tamers: Battle of Adventurers (Terriermon)
- Digimon Tamers: Runaway Locomon (Terriermon, Lopmon)

=== Games ===
- Cowboy Bebop (Edward Wong Hau Pepelu Tivrusky IV)
- Cowboy Bebop: Tsuioku no Serenade (Edward Wong Hau Pepelu Tivrusky IV)
- Sunrise Eiyūtan series (Run Forest, Edward Wong Hau Pepelu Tivrusky IV)
- Digimon Rumble Arena (Terriermon)
- Digimon New Century (Terriermon, Lopmon)

=== Theatre ===
- Annie (Annie)
- Algo Musical: Algo Hajimete no Bōken
- Algo Musical: Hikari no Hashi wo Koete
- Algo Musical: Ōgon no Shima
- The Sound of Music
- The Goodbye Girl
