= Ed (Cowboy Bebop) =

Fictional character from Cowboy Bebop

Edward Wong Hau Pepelu Tivrusky IV
- Cowboy Bebop character
- First appearance: "Jamming with Edward" (December 1998)
- Created by: Hajime Yatate; Shinichirō Watanabe
- Designed by: Toshihiro Kawamoto
- Portrayed by: Eden Perkins
- Voiced by: Japanese; Aoi Tada; English; Melissa Fahn

Edward Wong Hau Pepelu Tivrusky IV, also known as Ed, Radical Ed, and Radical Edward (real name Françoise Appledelhi) is a fictional character in the 1998 anime series Cowboy Bebop and the eponymous 2021 TV series. She is an eccentric teenage prodigy hacker girl who is about 13 years old.

In the original anime series, Ed is voiced by Aoi Tada in Japanese, and by Melissa Fahn in English; in the TV series, she is portrayed by Eden Perkins.

== Personality and traits ==
Ed has many quirky personality traits and childlike mannerisms. She always refers to herself in the third person, tends to speak in nursery rhymes, and is perpetually barefoot: when she tries to put on socks, she loses balance and falls.

Originally, Ed's character was inspired by the "inner behavior" of the shows' music composer, Yoko Kanno ("a little weird, catlike, but a genius at creating music"), and was first developed as a dark-skinned boy. It was changed to even the gender ratio on the Bebop, which was, with Ed as a boy, three males and one female. The original character design appears in session 5 as a young boy that steals an adult magazine from Annie's bookstore by smuggling it under his shirt which eventually he takes out and reads. Regarding Ed, Watanabe mentioned in a 2017 interview with IGN that the character's "gender is meaningless." As for the reason why Ed's gender was ambiguous, he said wanted to create a character that surpasses humanity, going so far as to say that Ed might not even be human. It was also during this interview that Watanabe referred to Ed as both "it" and "he."

== Reception ==
Mie Hiramoto, in her Multilingua paper ""Hey, You're a Girl?": Gendered Expressions in the Popular Anime, "Cowboy Bebop"", discussed Ed as a notable example of a gender-nonconforming character, and noted that her "non-conformity to feminine norms is not depicted by her use of masculine or feminine features, but by her predominant use of neutral features, or avoidance of gendered features". Andrea C. Keene likewise discussed Ed's character in the context of gender fludity, and also as a representation of Sophia as a female archetype of wisdom and search for philosophical meaning due to her hacker skills.

Jade King, writing for TheGamer, stated that Ed's "androgynous appearance and willingness to abandon gender norms has made them a non-binary icon of sorts, whether it was intentional or not".

Cowboy Bebop's voice actors described Ed as a "liquid" character that transcends all kinds of rigid definitions, including the gender binary.

Eden Perkins said: "Ed is such an amazing character. She’s just so incredibly lively, and she just brings energy wherever she goes... I really relate to her actually, and it was just so exciting being cast as her".

== See also ==
- List of fictional non-binary characters
- List of fictional child prodigies
- List of fictional hackers
- List of barefooters
