= Cowboy Bebop: The Movie =

2001 film by Shinichirō Watanabe

- Japanese theatrical release poster
- Directed by: Shinichirō Watanabe
- Screenplay by: Keiko Nobumoto
- Based on: Cowboy Bebop by Hajime Yatate
- Produced by: Masuo Ueda; Masahiko Minami; Minoru Takanashi
- Starring: Kōichi Yamadera; Megumi Hayashibara; Unshō Ishizuka; Aoi Tada; Ai Kobayashi; Tsutomu Isobe; Renji Ishibashi; Mickey Curtis
- Cinematography: Yōichi Ōgami
- Edited by: Shūichi Kakesu
- Music by: Yoko Kanno
- Production companies: Bones; Sunrise
- Distributed by: Sony Pictures Entertainment Japan
- Release date: September 1, 2001
- Running time: 115 minutes
- Country: Japan
- Language: Japanese
- Box office: $3 million

Cowboy Bebop: The Movie (Japanese: カウボーイビバップ 天国の扉, Hepburn: Kaubōi Bibappu Tengoku no Tobira; lit. 'Cowboy Bebop: Heaven's Door') is a 2001 science fiction action film, based on the 1998 Japanese anime series Cowboy Bebop created and produced by Sunrise. Several staff from the original series returned to work on the film, including director Shinichirō Watanabe, writer Keiko Nobumoto, character designer and animation director Toshihiro Kawamoto and composer Yoko Kanno. The Japanese and English voice casts also reprised their roles. Set between episodes 22 and 23 of the original series, the plot centers on a mysterious terrorist planning to exterminate the human population of Mars by releasing a virus, with the bounty hunter crew of the spaceship Bebop working to capture the terrorist and prevent the attack.

The film was conceived by Watanabe as an extension of his work on the television series, in which he had treated each episode as a miniature film. As not to alienate existing fans, much of the series' style was retained, with adjustments to make it accessible to a wider audience. Increased budget and production facilities enabled filming styles associated with live action films, as well as higher-quality animation than that of the series. Arabic aesthetics were used, in contrast to the series, which entailed Watanabe traveling to Morocco for research. Arabic elements also influenced Kanno's music.

Cowboy Bebop: The Movie was produced by Sunrise, which had previously developed the original series with animation by Bones, a later studio founded by former Sunrise staff.. Cowboy Bebop: The Movie was released theatrically in Japan on September 1, 2001, and in the United States on August 11, 2002. It went on to gross over $3 million worldwide, and when released on DVD, it performed highly on Japanese and American charts. The film received generally positive reviews from mainstream and anime critics, and was nominated for the Online Film Critics Society Award for Best Animated Film.

== Setting ==
The film is set in the year 2071, fifty years after a disaster on the Moon caused Earth to be largely abandoned and humanity to settle on other planets and moons of the Solar System. The film's protagonists are bounty hunters who travel together on the spaceship Bebop. They are Spike Spiegel, a former gangster; Faye Valentine, an amnesiac fugitive; Jet Black, a former police officer; Radical Edward, a hyperactive young hacker; and Ein, a small Welsh corgi with enhanced intelligence. Together they hunt for wanted fugitives and criminals throughout the Solar System.

== Plot ==
A few days before Halloween on Mars, Faye witnesses an unidentified terrorist blow up a tanker truck while chasing another bounty. The blast spreads an unknown pathogen that kills and sickens numerous people. The Martian government offers an astounding 300 million Woolong bounty for the culprit's capture, which the crew is highly eager to earn. Faye and Edward identify the terrorist as Vincent Volaju, a soldier believed to have been killed on Titan. Vincent survived a test of the same pathogen he unleashed, having been immunized, but amnesia and hallucinations have since driven him insane.

Jet learns that the pathogen is a nanomachine that poses as lymphocytes in the body, a biological weapon that has been illegally manufactured by Cherious Medical, a pharmaceutical company. Spike encounters Cherious's agent Electra Ovilo and attempts to capture Vincent, but Vincent throws him off a train and then releases another cloud of nanomachines. Everyone else on the train dies, except for Electra, who was immunized when in a relationship with Vincent. She gives a sample of her blood to a friend at Cherious Medical, and they prepare a stock of vaccine.

Vincent intends to explode giant jack-o'-lantern balloons full of nanomachines at the Halloween parade, which will kill everyone on Mars. Jet recruits a gang of aged crop-duster pilots to scatter the vaccine and Faye hijacks the city's weather-control systems to cause rain, assisting in the vaccine's spread. Spike confronts Vincent and the two fight to a standstill. The nanomachines are released, but Spike gets cured by the vaccine. Vincent prepares to kill Spike, but is shot by Electra. Vincent and Electra remember their time together as he dies. Afterwards, the Bebop crew return to their normal lives.

== Voice cast ==
Character	Japanese voice actor	English dub actor
Spike Spiegel	Kōichi Yamadera	Steve Blum
Faye Valentine	Megumi Hayashibara	Wendee Lee
Jet Black	Unshō Ishizuka	Beau Billingslea
Edward Wong	Aoi Tada	Melissa Fahn
Electra Ovirowa	Ai Kobayashi	Jennifer Hale
Vincent Volaju	Tsutomu Isobe	Daran Norris
Lee Sampson	Yūji Ueda	Dave Wittenberg
Rashid	Mickey Curtis	Nicholas Guest

== Development ==
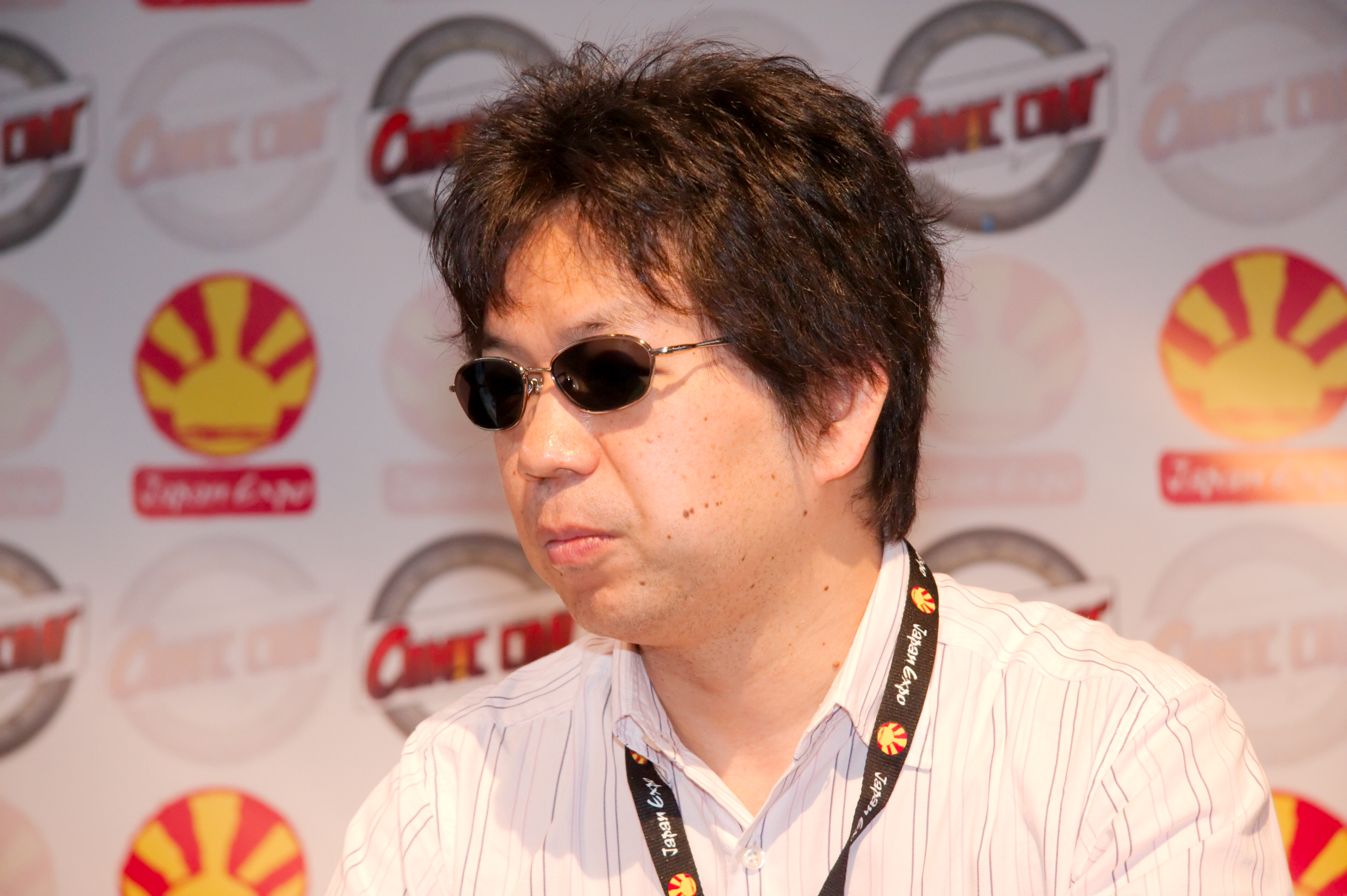
Director Shinichirō Watanabe

Cowboy Bebop: The Movie was first announced in September 1999. The majority of the series's staff returned along with Watanabe, including producer Masahiko Minami, character designer/animation director Toshihiro Kawamoto, and writer Keiko Nobumoto. The original Japanese cast also returned. After writing was completed, production began in July 2000. It was produced by the studios Sunrise, Bones and Bandai Visual. While Sunrise worked on the original series, Bones was founded in 1998 after the completion of the series by Minami, Kawamoto and Hiroshi Ōsaka. The length of the film's production allowed the team to ensure its high quality.

The idea for a film was an idea Watanabe had during the development of the original Cowboy Bebop series, which he had originally envisioned as a film. Watanabe treated each episode of the series as a miniature film, so to progress onto a feature-length film seemed natural to him. So as not to disappoint fans, the film incorporated as much of the series as possible while making it accessible to newcomers. He had thought up some of the story and the character of Vincent during the production of the series. After the series ended, there was demand for a continuation from both fans and sponsors, leading the crew to make the decision to make a film. Watanabe said "When the original 26-episode series concluded, a lot of fans and sponsors wanted me to continue. That's why I made this movie."

Watanabe was aiming towards a live-action look for the film despite its medium, using camera tricks, visual effects and character expression impossible in the series while keeping "the Bebop flavor". According to Kōichi Yamadera, the Japanese voice actor for Spike, the only real changes made by the team in the portrayal were to show off the characters, including Spike, in different ways: Spike, in particular, displayed more of his inner thoughts and showed a gentler side than he did in the series, as there was more time available to express such details. Watanabe personally chose the voice actors for Electra and Vincent. Vincent was partially intended as a type of villain that could not be done in the series, even though Watanabe felt he was not "particularly unique". The character of Vincent was also inspired by American actor Vincent Gallo.

Because of increased running time, budget and facilities, the team were able to include more cels in animations, as well as longer and more intricate action sequences. The film included difficult sequences that Watanabe could not do along with the rest of the film, so two guest directors were brought in for them: Hiroyuki Okiura, who handled the opening sequence, and Tensai Okamura, who created a cinematic Western shown at a drive-in theater during the film. Watanabe wanted to give the film an Arabic feel, in contrast to the series which often used New York and Hong Kong for inspiration. To this end, Watanabe went on a research trip to Morocco. The character Rashid was based on the guide who had shown the research team round the city visited. Working on the film was different for Watanabe when compared to the series in a positive way: while he had to put the entire story in a twenty-minute episode for the series, the team were able to create a longer, more detailed narrative.

=== Music ===
The music for Cowboy Bebop: The Movie was composed by Yoko Kanno, composer for the original series, and performed by her band Seatbelts. She used the same mixture of music genres (western, opera, jazz) as with the TV series, but also added Arabic elements in keeping with the film's thematic feel. She used Arabic and English for song lyrics. Alongside these, the soundtrack made use of a large number of rock instruments. Five tracks from the film were featured on the Seatbelts mini-album Ask DNA, released on July 25, 2001. The soundtrack's official release, Cowboy Bebop: Knockin' on Heaven's Door OST Future Blues, was released on August 22, 2001. Both these albums were reissued in December 2012.

== Release ==
Cowboy Bebop: The Movie was first released in cinemas in Japan on September 1, 2001. After the film's international release, this date was subject to debate among Western audiences due to its proximity to the September 11 attacks. It was first shown in the West at the 2002 AnimeCon, where it was announced that the original English cast would reprise their roles. Its Japanese subtitle, "Knockin' on Heaven's Door", was changed for the Western release due to sharing its name with the 1973 Bob Dylan song of the same name. Instead of creating a new subtitle, the team settled with using "The Movie", though a November 2018 re-release of the film by Funimation uses the original subtitle. It was jointly released in the United States by Sony Pictures sublabel Destination Films along with Samuel Goldwyn Films and internationally by TriStar Pictures. During its initial screening at the event, it sold out completely, prompting a second screening later in the event. The film received a limited theatrical release in the United States, opening on April 4, 2003. During its opening weekend, it reached 19th place in the box office chart, bringing in $12,338 per screening. The film's total gross in America was $1,000,045. Its worldwide gross totals $3,007,903.

The film was released on DVD in Japan on February 7, 2002, immediately reaching the top of the DVD/VHS charts. Sunrise and Bandai Visual underestimated the possible sales, with the first print being used up soon after release, prompting a second print for mid-February. Columbia TriStar Home Entertainment released it on DVD in the United States on June 24, 2003. In 2006, it was ranked as the sixth best-selling anime DVD in the United States. It did not receive a theatrical release in the United Kingdom, instead being released as a direct-to-DVD feature. It was released in the UK on June 27, 2003. The film was later released on Blu-ray disc in Japan on July 25, 2008. It was released in North America by Image Entertainment on June 28, 2011.

In celebration for the series's 20th anniversary in 2018, the film was shown in US theaters by Funimation Films on August 15 (with Japanese audio and English subtitles) and on August 16 (with the English dub). A limited edition steelbook Blu-ray of the film was released by Funimation under license from Sony Pictures Home Entertainment on November 13, 2018.

== Critical reception ==
On review aggregator Rotten Tomatoes, the film has an approval rating of 68% based on 78 reviews, with an average rating of 7.6/10. On Metacritic, the film has a weighted average score of 62 out of 100, based on 23 critics, indicating "generally positive reviews". The film was nominated at the Online Film Critics Society Awards 2003 in the Best Animated Film category, though it lost the award to Finding Nemo.

Critics' reviews have generally been positive. Helen McCarthy in 500 Essential Anime Movies praised the music of the movie, calling it "the show's secret weapon", and stated that "the movie's only real fault is that it's about half an hour too long". Andy Patrizio of IGN gave the film a score of 9 of 10, saying that the developers "did a superb job of fleshing out the story", as well as praising it for "not succumbing to melodrama like many of its live-action counterparts". He also commented that the film's subject matter of terrorism in the face of the September 11 attacks "smacked way too close to home". The music also received praise. Mike Crandol of Anime News Network echoed many of these sentiments. His main criticism stemmed from the fact that Jet, Faye and Ed were relegated to supporting roles, and that it was difficult getting them all into the story. He also said that the team had outdone themselves with the animation quality in a few scenes, such as the final fight between Spike and Vincent. Robert Koehler of Variety, reviewing an undubbed subtitled release, praised the visuals and writing, although he found some sections a little long. Charles Solomon writing in the Los Angeles Times however praised the film for its running time, saying it gave screenwriter Keiko Nobumoto time to explore the characters.

Other reviews were more mixed. Lawrence van Gelder of The New York Times gave the film a mixed review, saying that he enjoyed the experience, but found it a little frivolous when compared to both its subject matter and events at the time. His ultimate impression from the English-dubbed version was that the film could easily have been set in present-day New York. Peter Bradshaw of The Guardian gave the film 2 out of 5 stars and praised the film's visuals, but said that the plot failed to keep him interested. Jamie Russell, writing for the BBC, gave it 4 out of 5 stars, saying it was "good enough to deserve mention in the same breath as Akira, Ghost in the Shell, and Spirited Away". The most praise went to the use of live-action camera angles. Though he found the film's story sometimes slowed noticeably, the soundtrack and visual references to other notable action films made it "an example of anime at its very best." Other newspapers of the time including the Toronto Star and Chicago Tribune generally shared opinions with other reviewers: several praised the plot and animation, while others were mixed. Others, including the Toronto Star and Newark Star-Ledger, noted its references to science fiction films. Leonard Maltin in Movie Guide praised the film's stylish animation and humor.

== Analysis ==
While the movie is technically set on Mars, it has been described by Thomas Kent Miller as "only a Mars movie by a technicality" due to the fact that "aside from a brief flyover over some Martian terrain at the beginning and a classic dog-fight over the same sort of terrain at the end", there are next to no other visuals to suggest that the film takes place in an exotic location (here, Mars); instead the urban design of the city where most of the movie takes place looks no different from modern-era cities on Earth.

== See also ==
- List of films set on Mars
