= Seatbelts (band) =

Japanese band

SEATBELTS
- Origin: Tokyo, Japan
- Genres: Jazz; rock; funk; blues; folk; electronic; world; orchestral pop
- Years active: 1998–2004, 2020–present
- Labels: Victor Entertainment, Captain Duckling Records
- Website: starducks.me

Seatbelts (シートベルツ, Shītoberutsu; also known as Seat Belts or SEATBELTS) is a Japanese band led by composer and instrumentalist Yoko Kanno. An international ensemble comprising both a stable lineup of musicians and various collaborators, the band was assembled by Kanno in 1998 to perform the soundtrack music for the Cowboy Bebop anime series. Their repertoire covered and blended many different genres, mainly jazz, but also a wide variety of rock, electronic, funk, blues, orchestral pop and other styles of genres.

== Band history ==
The name of the band, according to the fictional description given in their first album Cowboy Bebop, derives from how the performers wear seatbelts to be safe while they play hardcore jam sessions.

The band performed the entire soundtrack of the anime series Cowboy Bebop and produced a total of seven albums (three new songs in Cowboy Bebop Tank! THE! BEST!) and one live DVD.

The band performed virtually in the midst of the COVID-19 pandemic in 2020 to participate in new projects. In collaboration with Funimation, Sunrise, and composer Mason Lieberman, the band rerecorded the ending theme of Cowboy Bebop, "The Real Folk Blues", to raise proceeds for COVID-19 relief.

In addition, the band began the Session Starducks project on a newly founded YouTube channel in April 2020. In collaboration with different musicians as well as with the original members of the band, the project recorded new interpretations of various compositions. These include songs from Cowboy Bebop, Ghost in the Shell: Stand Alone Complex and Macross Frontier.

It was confirmed in April 2020 that Kanno would be returning to compose the upcoming live-action adaption of Cowboy Bebop for Netflix. It was later confirmed in November 2021 that the Seatbelts were to perform the music for the new adaptation.

== Discography ==
=== Studio albums ===
- Cowboy Bebop (1998)
- Cowboy Bebop Vitaminless (1998)
- Cowboy Bebop No Disc (1998)
- Cowboy Bebop Blue (1999)
- Ask DNA (2001)
- Future Blues (2001)
- Cowboy Bebop (Soundtrack from the Netflix Series) (2021)

=== Live albums ===
- Future Blues DVD (2001)

=== Remixes and compilation albums ===
- Cowboy Bebop Remixes: Music for Freelance (1999)
- Cowgirl Ed (2001)
- Cowboy Bebop Boxed Set (2002)
- Cowboy Bebop Tank! THE! BEST! (2004)
- Space Bio Charge (2009)

=== Singles ===
- "TANK! Virtual Session 2020" (2020)
- "'Real Folk Blues' For These Days" (2020)
- "Don't Bother None 2020" (2020)
- "Space Lion Virtual Session 2020" (2020)

=== As a featured artist ===
- "The Real Folk Blues" (2020) (with Mason Lieberman)
