= Cowboy Bebop: Tsuioku no Serenade =

2005 video game

- Developer(s): Chime
- Publisher(s): Bandai
- Composer(s): Yoko Kanno
- Platform(s): PlayStation 2
- Release: JP: August 25, 2005
- Genre(s): Action
- Mode(s): Single-player

Cowboy Bebop: Tsuioku no Serenade (カウボーイビバップ 追憶の夜曲(セレナーデ), Kaubōi Bibappu: Tsuioku no Serenāde; lit. "Cowboy Bebop: Serenade of Reminiscence") is a PlayStation 2 action/beat 'em up video game from Bandai, released in Japan on August 25, 2005. It has an original story based on the anime series Cowboy Bebop. An English translation patch was released on August 25, 2025.

== Story ==
The game follows an original story set in the Cowboy Bebop universe. Its events center around a search for a space pirate's treasure, a mysterious song called Diamonds, and a mysterious organization that stands in the way of the Bebop crew.

== Gameplay ==
Playable characters include Spike, Faye, and Jet, (each of whom are voiced by their respective voice actors from the anime series) while Ed provides objectives, advice, and moral support. Ein appears alongside Ed as well. Action occurs on foot with both hand-to-hand and shooting segments, often with small puzzles to solve, as well as items to search for (either essential to the plot or bonus items that appear in the gallery). Certain sections of the game require piloting spacecraft and, in one section, a boat. Gameplay is punctuated by long cutscenes that develop the story. There is also a blackjack mini-game featuring the Bebop crew as rotating dealers; this provides a way to earn additional money to unlock bonuses, such as songs for the music player and character profiles.

== Music ==
Three new songs were composed by Yoko Kanno, famous for her music in the series. The anime's OST is reused for the game. Three songs performed by Italian vocalist Ilaria Graziano were released on the Tank! THE! BEST! album.

== Reception ==
IGN said: "Early impressions indicated that the game would probably appeal to fans of the anime series." Kotaku wrote: "[...] it's a pretty terrible game—though its cutscenes make for a decent episode." Game Rant called the reception at the time mediocre.
