= Cowboy Bebop =

1998 space western anime television series

- Promotional poster

カウボーイビバップ (Kaubōi Bibappu)
- Genre: Neo-noir (Note: See); Space Western (Note: See)
- Created by: Hajime Yatate
- Manga

Cowboy Bebop: Shooting Star
- Illustrated by: Cain Kuga
- Published by: Kadokawa Shoten
- English publisher: NA: Tokyopop
- Magazine: Monthly Asuka Fantasy DX
- Original run: September 18, 1997 – June 18, 1998
- Volumes: 2
- Anime television series
- Directed by: Shinichirō Watanabe
- Produced by: Masahiko Minami; Kazuhiko Ikeguchi
- Written by: Keiko Nobumoto
- Music by: Yoko Kanno
- Studio: Sunrise
- Licensed by: AUS: Madman Entertainment; NA: Crunchyroll (Note: Through Crunchyroll, LLC, formerly as Funimation); UK: Anime Limited
- Original network: TXN (TV Tokyo), Wowow
- English network: AU: ABC2, Sci Fi Channel (Animax); AUS: Adult Swim; CA: Razer (Kamikaze); PH: GMA Network, TV5, Hero, TeleAsia Filipino; SA: Animax; SEA: Animax; SG: Arts Central; UK: CNX, AnimeCentral, Showcase TV, Viceland; US: Adult Swim (Toonami) (Note: Before its rerun airings on Toonami, Cowboy Bebop aired numerous times as part of Adult Swim's Adult Swim Action branding before the block's May 2012 relaunch.)
- Original run: TV Tokyo broadcast April 3, 1998 – June 26, 1998; Wowow broadcast October 24, 1998 – April 24, 1999
- Episodes: 26
- Manga
- Illustrated by: Yutaka Nanten
- Published by: Kadokawa Shoten
- English publisher: NA: Tokyopop
- Magazine: Monthly Asuka Fantasy DX
- Original run: October 18, 1998 – February 18, 2000
- Volumes: 3
- Anime film
- Cowboy Bebop: The Movie (2001)
- Live-action television series
- Cowboy Bebop (2021)
- icon

Cowboy Bebop (Japanese: カウボーイビバップ, Hepburn: Kaubōi Bibappu) is a Japanese neo-noir space Western anime television series that aired on TV Tokyo and Wowow from 1998 to 1999. Created and animated by Sunrise, it was led by a production team of director Shinichirō Watanabe, screenwriter Keiko Nobumoto, character designer Toshihiro Kawamoto, mechanical designer Kimitoshi Yamane, and composer Yoko Kanno, who are collectively billed as Hajime Yatate. The series, which ran for twenty-six episodes (dubbed "sessions"), is set in the year 2071 and follows the lives of a traveling bounty-hunting crew aboard a spaceship, the Bebop. Although it incorporates a wide variety of genres, the series draws most heavily from science fiction, Western, and noir films. It explores themes such as existential boredom, loneliness, and the inability to escape one's past.

Cowboy Bebop was a critical and commercial success both in Japanese and international markets, most notably in the United States, and has been widely hailed as one of the best animated series of all time. It garnered several major anime and science fiction awards and received acclaim from critics and audiences for its style, characters, story, voice acting, animation, and soundtrack. The English dub was particularly lauded and is regarded as one of the best anime English dubs. Credited with helping to introduce anime to a new wave of Western viewers in the early 2000s, Cowboy Bebop has also been called a gateway series.

== Plot ==
In the year 2071, roughly fifty years after an accident with a hyperspace gateway that made Earth almost uninhabitable, humanity has colonized most of the rocky planets and moons of the Solar System. Amid a rising crime rate, the Inter Solar System Police (ISSP) set up a legalized contract system, in which registered bounty hunters (also referred to as "Cowboys") pursue criminals and bring them in alive in return for a reward. The series' protagonists are bounty hunters working from the spaceship Bebop. The initial crew consists of Spike Spiegel, an exiled former hitman of the criminal Red Dragon Syndicate, and Jet Black, a former ISSP officer. They are later joined by Faye Valentine, an amnesiac con artist; Edward Wong, an eccentric child, skilled in hacking; and Ein, a genetically engineered Pembroke Welsh Corgi with human-like intelligence. Throughout the series, the team gets involved in disastrous mishaps, leaving them without money, while often confronting familiar faces and events from their pasts: These include Jet's reasons for leaving the ISSP and Faye's past as a young woman from Earth injured in an accident and cryogenically frozen to save her life.

While much of the show is episodic, the main story arc focuses on Spike and his deadly rivalry with Vicious, an ambitious and ruthless criminal of the Red Dragon Syndicate. Spike and Vicious were once partners and friends. However, when Spike began an affair with Vicious's girlfriend, Julia, and resolved to leave the syndicate with her, Vicious attempted to eliminate Spike by blackmailing Julia into killing him. Julia hides to protect herself and Spike, while Spike fakes his death to escape the syndicate. In the present, Julia comes out of hiding and reunites with Spike, intending to make their planned future a reality. Vicious, having staged a coup d'état and taken over the syndicate, sends hitmen after the pair. Julia is killed, leaving Spike alone. Spike leaves the Bebop after finally apologizing to Faye and Jet. Upon infiltrating the syndicate, he finds Vicious on the top floor of the building and confronts him after dispatching the remaining Red Dragon members. The final battle ends with Spike killing Vicious, only to be seriously wounded himself in the ensuing confrontation. Looking up to the sky, Spike sees a vision of Julia. The series concludes as Spike descends the main staircase of the building into the rising sun before eventually falling to the ground in front of the remaining syndicate members, presumably dead.

== Genre and themes ==
Shinichirō Watanabe created a special tagline for the series to promote it during its original presentation, calling it "a new genre unto itself". The line was inserted before and after commercial breaks during its Japanese and US broadcasts. Later, Watanabe called the phrase an "exaggeration". The show is a hybrid of multiple genres, most notably Westerns, noirs, and pulp fiction. One reviewer described it as "space opera meets noir, meets comedy, meets cyberpunk". It has also been called a "genre-busting space Western".

The musical style was emphasized in many of the episode titles. Multiple philosophical themes are explored throughout the series using the characters, including existentialism, existential boredom, loneliness, and the effects of the past. Other concepts referenced include environmentalism and capitalism. The series also makes specific references to or pastiches multiple films, including the works of John Woo and Bruce Lee, Midnight Run, 2001: A Space Odyssey, and Alien. Additionally, the series incorporates extensive references and elements from science fiction, bearing strong similarities to the cyberpunk fiction of William Gibson. Several planets and space stations in the series are made in Earth's image. The streets of celestial objects such as Ganymede resemble a modern port city, while Mars features shopping malls, theme parks, casinos and cities. This setting has been described as "one part Chinese diaspora and two parts wild west".

=== Characters ===
Main cast from left to right: Jet Black, Spike Spiegel, Faye Valentine, Edward, and Ein

The characters were created by Watanabe and designed by Toshihiro Kawamoto. Watanabe envisioned each character as an extension of his own personality, or as an opposite person to himself. Each character, from the main cast to supporting characters, was designed to be an outlaw unable to fit into society. Kawamoto designed the characters so they could be easily distinguished from one another. All the main cast are characterized by a deep sense of loneliness or resignation to their fate and past. From the perspective of Brian Camp and Julie Davis, the main characters resemble the main ones of the manga and anime series Lupin III, if only superficially, given their more troubled pasts and more complex personalities.

The series's primary focus is on the main protagonist Spike Spiegel (voiced by Koichi Yamadera), a "space cowboy" with fluffy black hair, often seen wearing a blue suit. The overall theme of the series is often interpreted as being Spike's past and the karmic effect it has on him. Spike is portrayed as someone who, having been separated from the woman he loves, has lost his expectations for the future and finds himself in a near-constant state of lethargy. Watanabe specified that Spike should have an artificial eye, as he wanted the crew of the Bebop to have flaws which would be explored in the show's plot. Originally, Spike was set to be portrayed wearing an eyepatch, but this decision was vetoed by producers.

Jet Black (voiced by Unshō Ishizuka) is shown as someone who lost confidence in his former life and has become cynical about the state of society. Spike and Jet were designed to be opposites, with Spike being thin and wearing smart attire, while Jet was bulky and wore more casual clothing. The clothing, which was dark in color, also reflected their states of mind. The rebellious hustler Faye Valentine, hacker "Radical" Edward (voiced by Aoi Tada), and "data dog" Ein join the crew in later episodes. Their designs were intended to contrast with Spike's. Faye was described by her voice actress Megumi Hayashibara as initially being an "ugly" woman, with her defining traits being her liveliness, sensuality and humanity. To emphasize her situation when first introduced, she was compared to Poker Alice, a famous Western figure.

Edward and Ein were the only main characters to have real-life models. The former had her behavior based on the antics of Yoko Kanno as observed by Watanabe when he first met her. While generally portrayed as carefree and eccentric, Edward is motivated by a sense of loneliness after being abandoned by her father. Kawamoto initially based Ein's design on a friend's pet corgi, later getting one himself to use as a motion model.

== Production ==
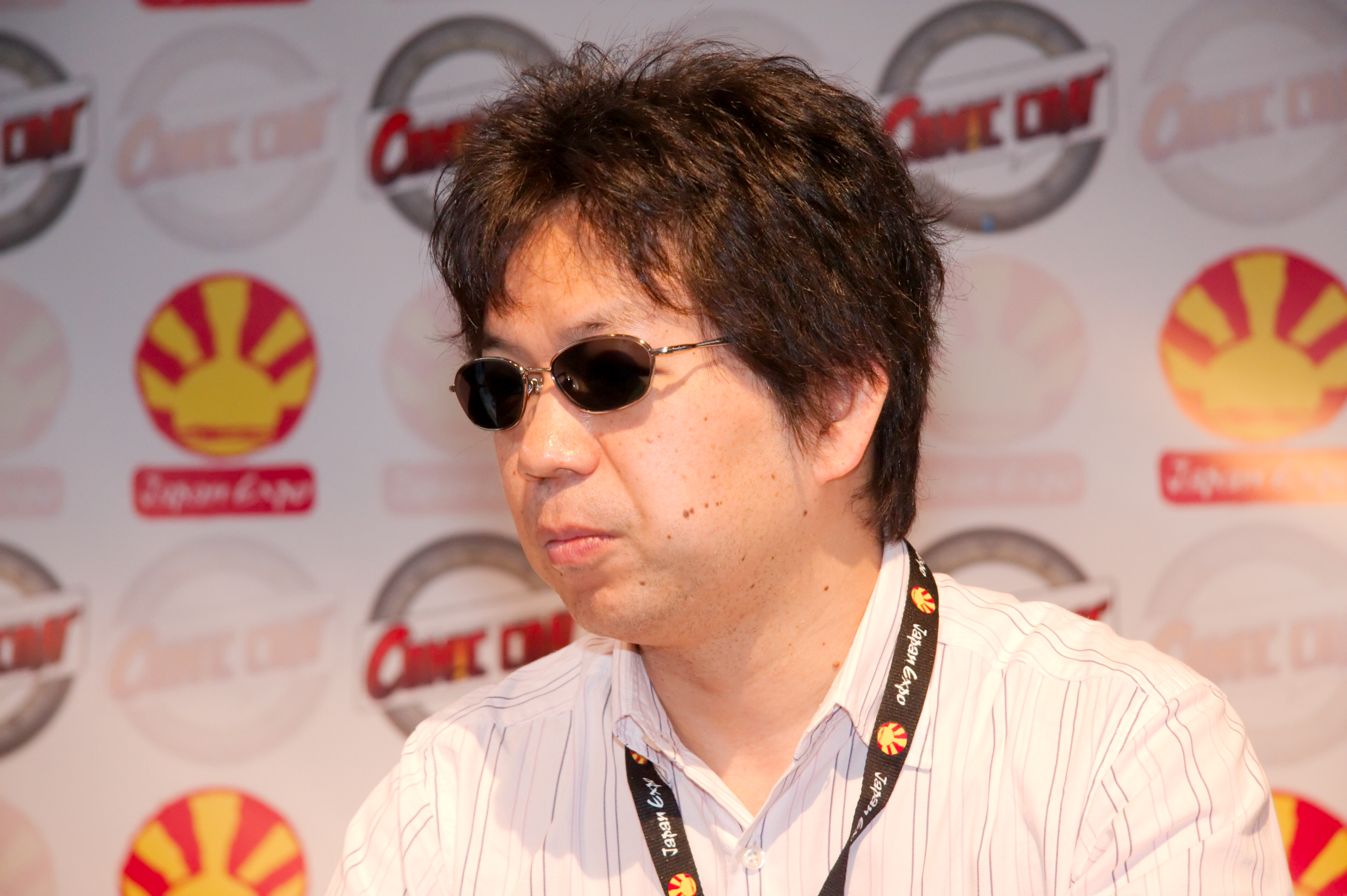
Series director Shinichirō Watanabe at the 2009 Japan Expo

Cowboy Bebop was created and developed by animation studio Sunrise and Hajime Yatate, the well-known pseudonym for the collective contributions of Sunrise's animation staff. The leader of the series' creative team was director Shinichirō Watanabe, most notable at the time for directing Macross Plus and Mobile Suit Gundam 0083: Stardust Memory. Other leading members of Sunrise's creative team were screenwriter Keiko Nobumoto, character designer Toshihiro Kawamoto, mechanical art designer Kimitoshi Yamane, composer Yoko Kanno, and producers Masahiko Minami and Yoshiyuki Takei. Most of them had previously worked together, in addition to having credits on other popular anime titles. Nobumoto had scripted Macross Plus, Kawamoto had designed the characters for Gundam, and Kanno had composed the music for Macross Plus and The Vision of Escaflowne. Yamane had not worked with Watanabe yet, but his credits in anime included Bubblegum Crisis and The Vision of Escaflowne. Minami joined the project as he wanted to do something different from his previous work on mecha anime.

=== Concept ===
Cowboy Bebop was Watanabe's first project as solo director, as he had been co-director in his previous works. His original concept was for a film, and during production he treated each episode as a miniature movie. His main inspiration for Cowboy Bebop was the first series of the anime Lupin III, a crime drama focusing on the exploits of the series' titular character. Co-writer Keiko Nobumoto was also inspired by British acid jazz Jamiroquai's song "Space Cowboy". When developing the series' story, Watanabe began by creating the characters first. He explained, "the first image that occurred to me was one of Spike, and from there I tried to build a story around him, trying to make him cool." While the original dialogue of the series avoided any profanities, its level of sophistication was made appropriate to adults in a criminal environment. Watanabe described Cowboy Bebop as "80% serious story and 20% humorous touch". The comical episodes were harder for the team to write than the serious ones, and though several events in them seemed random, they were carefully planned in advance. Watanabe conceived the series' ending early on, and each episode involving Spike and Vicious was meant to foreshadow their final confrontation. Some of the staff were unhappy about this approach as a continuation of the series would be difficult. While he considered altering the ending, he eventually settled with his original idea. The reason for the ending was that Watanabe did not want the series to become like Star Trek, with him being tied to doing it for years.

=== Development ===
The project had initially originated with Bandai's toy division as a sponsor, with the goal of selling spacecraft toys. Watanabe recalled his only instruction was "So long as there's a spaceship in it, you can do whatever you want." But upon viewing early footage, it became clear that Watanabe's vision for the series did not match Bandai's. Believing the series would never sell toy merchandise, Bandai pulled out of the project, leaving it in development hell until sister company Bandai Visual stepped in to sponsor it. Since there was no need to merchandise toys with the property any more, Watanabe had free rein in the development of the series. Watanabe wanted to design not just a space adventure series for adolescent boys but a program that would also appeal to sophisticated adults. During the making of Bebop, Watanabe often attempted to rally the animation staff by telling them that the show would be something memorable up to three decades later. While some of them were doubtful of that at the time, Watanabe many years later expressed his happiness to have been proven right in retrospect. He joked that if Bandai Visual had not intervened then "you might be seeing me working the supermarket checkout counter right now."

The city locations of the show were generally inspired by New York and Hong Kong. The atmospheres of the planets and the ethnic groups in Cowboy Bebop mostly originated from Watanabe's ideas, with some collaboration from set designers Isamu Imakake, Shoji Kawamori, and Dai Satō. The animation staff established the particular planet atmospheres early in the production of the series before working on the ethnic groups. It was Watanabe who wanted to have several of ethnically diverse groups appear in the series. Mars was the planet most often used in Cowboy Bebop's storylines, with Satoshi Toba, the cultural and setting producer, explaining that the other planets "were unexpectedly difficult to use". He stated that each planet in the series had unique features, and the producers had to take into account the characteristics of each planet in the story. For the final episode, Toba explained that it was not possible for the staff to have the dramatic rooftop scene occur on Venus, so the staff "ended up normally falling back to Mars". In creating the backstory, Watanabe envisioned a world that was "multinational rather than stateless". In spite of certain American influences in the series, he stipulated that the country had been destroyed decades prior to the story, later saying the notion of the United States as the center of the world repelled him.

The specific types of guns in the show were chosen by Watanabe, and in discussion with set designer Isamu Imakake and mechanical designer Kimitoshi Yamane. Setting producer Satoshi Toba said, "They talked about how they didn't want common guns, because that wouldn't be very interesting, and so they decided on these guns."

=== Music ===
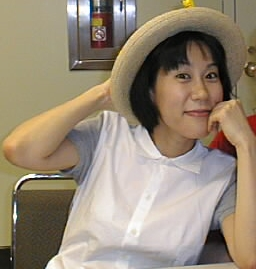
Yoko Kanno in 1999

The music for Cowboy Bebop was composed by Yoko Kanno and primarily comprises jazz, along with western and opera. Kanno formed the blues and jazz band Seatbelts to perform the music. According to Kanno, the music was one of the first aspects to begin production, before most of the characters, story, or animation had been finalized. The series has been said to be "build around the a jazz structure rather than treating the soundtrack as background".

Watanabe said Kanno operated independently: "She gets inspired on her own, follows up on her own imagery, and comes to me saying 'this is the song we need for Cowboy Bebop', and composes something completely on her own." She was sometimes surprised at how her music was mixed into the show, at times wishing it had been used elsewhere, but felt that none of its uses were "inappropriate". She was pleased with the working environment, finding the team more relaxed than other teams she had worked with.

Watanabe said Kanno's music inspired him to create new scenes, which in turn inspired Kanno to create more music, including music she had not been commissioned for. According to Watanabe, while this normally would be "unforgivable and unacceptable", it was a "big hit" with Cowboy Bebop. Watanabe described their collaboration "a game of catch between the two of us in developing the music and creating the TV series". Cowboy Bebop's music has been released across seven soundtrack albums, two singles and EPs, and two compilations through label Victor Entertainment.

== Distribution ==
=== Broadcast ===
Cowboy Bebop debuted on TV Tokyo, one of the main broadcasters of anime in Japan, airing from April 3 until June 26, 1998. Due to its 6:00 p.m. timeslot and depictions of graphic violence, the show's first run only included episodes 2, 3, 7 to 15, 18 and a special. Later that year, the series aired in its entirety from October 23 until April 24, 1999, on satellite network Wowow. The full series has also been broadcast across Japan by anime television network Animax, which has aired the series via its respective networks across Southeast Asia, South Asia and East Asia.

The first non-Asian country to air Cowboy Bebop was Italy. There, it was first aired on October 21, 1999, on MTV, where it inaugurated the 9:00–10:30 p.m. Anime Night programming block.

In the United States, Cowboy Bebop was one of the first programs shown when Cartoon Network's late night block Adult Swim debuted on September 2, 2001, being the first anime shown on the block that night at midnight ET. During its original run on Adult Swim, episodes 6, 8, and 22 were skipped due to their violent themes in wake of the September 11 attacks. By the third run of the series, all these episodes had premiered for the first time. Cowboy Bebop was successful enough to be broadcast repeatedly for four years. It has been run at least once every year since 2007, and HD remasters of the show began broadcasting in 2015. In the United Kingdom, it was first broadcast in 2002 on the adult-oriented channel CNX. From November 6, 2007, it repeatedly aired on AnimeCentral until the channel's closure in August 2008. In Australia, Cowboy Bebop was first broadcast on pay television in 2002 on Adult Swim, and on free-to-air-TV on ABC2 (the national digital public television channel) on January 2, 2007. It has re-aired several times, most recently starting in 2008. Cowboy Bebop: The Movie also aired on February 23, 2009, on SBS (a hybrid-funded Australian public broadcasting television network). In Canada, Cowboy Bebop was first broadcast on December 24, 2006, on Razer.

In Latin America, the series was first broadcast on pay-TV in 2001 on Locomotion. It aired again on January 9, 2016, on I.Sat.

=== Home media ===
DVD name	Content	Release date
Session One	Episodes 1–5	April 4, 2000
Session Two	Episodes 6–10	May 2, 2000
Session Three	Episodes 11–14	July 13, 2000
Session Four	Episodes 15–18	April 4, 2001
Session Five	Episodes 19–22	May 2, 2001
Session Six	Episodes 23–26	July 13, 2001
The Perfect Sessions	Episodes 1–26; Cowboy Bebop OST 1; Collector's Art Box	November 6, 2001
Best Sessions	Various	November 19, 2002

Cowboy Bebop has been released in four separate editions in North America. The first edition was released in VHS format either as a box set or as seven individual tapes. The tapes were sold through Anime Village, a division of Bandai.

The second edition was released in 2000 individually, and featured uncut versions of the original 26 episodes. In 2001, these DVDs were collected in the special edition Perfect Sessions, which included the first 6 DVDs, the first Cowboy Bebop soundtrack, and a collector's box. At the time of release, the art box from the Perfect Sessions was made available for purchase on The Right Stuff International as a solo item for collectors who already owned the series.

The third edition, The Best Sessions, was released in 2002 and featured what Bandai considered to be the best 6 episodes of the series remastered in Dolby Digital 5.1 and DTS surround sound.

The fourth edition, Cowboy Bebop Remix, was also distributed on 6 discs and included the original 26 uncut episodes, with sound remastered in Dolby Digital 5.1 and video remastered under the supervision of Shinichirō Watanabe. This release also included various extras that were not present in the original release. Cowboy Bebop Remix was itself collected as the Cowboy Bebop Remix: The Complete Collection in 2008.

In December 2012, newly founded distributor Anime Limited announced via Facebook and Twitter that they had acquired the home video license of the series for release in the United Kingdom. Part 1 of the Blu-ray collection was released on July 29, 2013, while Part 2 was released on October 14. The standard DVD Complete Collection was originally meant to be released on September 23, 2013, with Part 2 of the Blu-ray release, but due to mastering and manufacturing errors, the Complete Collection was delayed until November 27. Following the closure of Bandai Entertainment in 2012, Funimation (later Crunchyroll, LLC) and Sunrise had announced that they rescued Cowboy Bebop, along with a handful of other former Bandai Entertainment properties, for home video and digital release. Funimation released the series on Blu-ray and DVD on December 16, 2014. The series was released in four separate editions: standard DVD, standard Blu-ray, an Amazon.com exclusive Blu-ray/DVD combo, and a Funimation.com exclusive Blu-ray/DVD combo. Crunchyroll released a limited edition Blu-ray box set on April 4, 2023, for its 25th anniversary.

=== Streaming ===
Netflix acquired the worldwide streaming rights to the original anime, with all 26 episodes available worldwide as of October 21, 2021. As of October 21, 2023, the show is unavailable in the United States and Canada. The series is available on Hulu, Apple TV and Funimation in the United States. On March 1, 2022, the anime became available on Crunchyroll to consolidate both Funimation and Wakanim into the service.

== Related media ==
=== Manga ===
Two Cowboy Bebop manga series adaptations have been released, both published by Kadokawa Shoten and serialized in Kadokawa Corporation's shōjo manga magazine Asuka Fantasy DX. The first manga series, titled Cowboy Bebop: Shooting Star and illustrated by Cain Kuga, was serialized from October 1997, before the anime series' release, to July 1998. It was collected into two tankōbon volumes in 1998, the first one in May and the second one in September. The second manga series, simply titled Cowboy Bebop and illustrated by Yutaka Nanten, was serialized from November 1998 to March 2000. It was collected into three volumes, the first two in April and October 1999, and the third one in April 2000. Both manga series were licensed by Tokyopop for release in North America.

=== Video games ===
A Cowboy Bebop video game, developed and published by Bandai, was released in Japan for the PlayStation on May 14, 1998. A PlayStation 2 video game, Cowboy Bebop: Tsuioku no Serenade, was released in Japan on August 25, 2005, and an English version had been set for release in North America. However, in January 2007, IGN reported that the release had likely been cancelled, speculating that it did not survive Bandai's merger with Namco to form Bandai Namco Games.

==== Super Robot Wars T ====
In 2022, Cowboy Bebop made its debut in the Bandai Namco crossover game Super Robot Wars T, which is traditionally focused on turn-based mecha combat. In 2024, skins based on Cowboy Bebop characters were added to Blizzard Entertainment's first-person shooter Overwatch 2. In 2025, skins based on Cowboy Bebop characters Spike Spiegel and Faye Valentine were added to Epic Games' Fortnite Battle Royale.

=== Film ===
An anime film taking place between episodes 22 and 23 of the television series, titled Cowboy Bebop: Knockin' on Heaven's Door (カウボーイビバップ 天国の扉, Kaubōi Bibappu: Tengoku no Tobira), known in English as Cowboy Bebop: The Movie, was produced, with the staff and crew from the show returning to their roles. It was released in Japan in September 2001 and in the United States in August 2002.

On July 22, 2008, If published an article on its website regarding a rumor of a live-action Cowboy Bebop film in development by 20th Century Fox. Producer Erwin Stoff said that the film's development was in the early stages, and that they had "just signed it". Keanu Reeves was to play the role of Spike Spiegel. Variety confirmed on January 15, 2009, that production company Sunrise Animation would be "closely involved with the development of the English-language project". The site also confirmed Kenji Uchida, Shinichirō Watanabe and series writer Keiko Nobumoto as associate producers, series producer Masahiko Minami as a production consultant, and Peter Craig as screenwriter. This was lauded by various sources as a promising move for the potential quality of the film. At the time, it was slated to release in 2011, but problems with the budget delayed its production. The submitted script was sent back for rewrite to reduce the cost and little has been heard about it since an interview with producer Joshua Long on October 15, 2010; the project currently languishes in development hell. On October 25, 2014, series director Watanabe was asked about the live action film at the MCM London Comic Con. He stated: "I'm afraid I don't know what they're thinking in Hollywood. Apparently the project hasn't come to a stop but I don't know how it's going to progress from here on. I hear that there are a lot of 'Hollywood' problems."

=== Live-action series ===
In 2017, it was announced that an American live-action adaptation of the series was being developed by Tomorrow Studios, a partnership between Marty Adelstein and ITV Studios, with executive production by Sunrise Inc. Christopher Yost was to write the series, and Netflix announced that it would distribute it. On April 4, 2019, Variety reported that John Cho, Mustafa Shakir, Daniella Pineda and Alex Hassell had been cast. Production was shut down in October 2019 due to a knee injury sustained by Cho, setting production back by more than six months. On April 17, 2020, it was revealed that the episodes would be an hour long. On May 19, 2020, Adelstein revealed that there were three finished episodes and that they had shot at least six episodes before Cho's knee injury. In the same interview it was revealed that the director of the anime series, Shinichirō Watanabe, had been hired as a creative consultant. Production in New Zealand resumed on September 30, 2020, following a COVID-19 lockdown in the country. The series was released on November 19, 2021, to mixed-to-negative reviews. On December 9, 2021, it was announced that it would not be renewed for a second season, with Netflix cancelling it entirely due to poor ratings and reception.

=== Other media ===
An official side story titled Cowboy Bebop: UT tells the story of Ural and Victoria Terpsichore (V.T. from the episode "Heavy Metal Queen") when they were bounty hunters. The story was available in its own official site; however the website was closed and is currently available at the site mirror.

A deck-building board game, Cowboy Bebop: Space Serenade, was released in 2019.

== Reception ==
=== Critical reception ===
Cowboy Bebop received unanimous acclaim upon its debut. In 1998, Japanese critic Keith Rhee highlighted the series as a standout in an otherwise "run-of-the-mill" season, praising its overall production values, and singling out Kanno's soundtrack as "a much-welcome change from all the sugary J-pop tunes of most anime features". Rhee also highlighted the show's Japanese "all-star cast", which his colleague Mark L. Johnson described as being filled with "veteran voice talent", turning in even greater performances than those of their "above average" US counterparts. In 1999, Australian magazine Hyper reviewed the anime and rated it 9.5 out of 10. Paste and IGN named it as the best and second best anime of all time, respectively.

Anime News Network's Mike Crandol gave the series an 'A+' rating for the dubbed version, and an 'A' rating for the subbed version. He characterized the series as "one of the most popular and respected anime titles in history", before adding that it was "a unique television show which skillfully transcends all kinds of genres". Crandol praised its characters as "some of the most endearing characters to ever grace an anime", and commended the voice acting, especially the "flawless English cast". He also complimented the series' "movie-quality" animation, "sophisticated" writing, and its "incredible" musical score. Crandol hailed Cowboy Bebop as a "landmark" anime "that will be remembered long after many others have been forgotten", and went on to call it "one of the greatest anime titles ever". Additionally, Michael Toole of Anime News Network named Cowboy Bebop as one of the most important anime of the 1990s.

T.H.E.M. Anime Reviews gave the entire series a perfect score of 5 out of 5 stars, with reviewer Christina Carpenter believing Cowboy Bebop as "one of the best [anime]" and touting it as a masterpiece that "puts most anime ... and Hollywood, to shame". She described it as a "very stylish, beautifully crafted series that deserves much more attention than it gets". Carpenter praised the animation as "a rarity and a marvel to behold" and that it was "beyond superb", and the plot and characterization as having "a sophistication and subtlety that is practically one-of-a-kind". She also praised the soundtrack, and hailed the opening theme as one of the best intro pieces she had ever heard. Carpenter went to say that Bebop was a "must-have for any serious collector of Japanese animation".

In his article "Asteroid Blues: The Lasting Legacy of Cowboy Bebop", The Atlantic writer Alex Suskind states, "On paper, Cowboy Bebop, the legendary cult anime series from Shinichirō Watanabe, reads like something John Wayne, Elmore Leonard, and Philip K. Dick came up with during a wild, all-night whiskey bender." He goes on to write, "The response from critics and fans may have sounded hyperbolic—the word 'masterpiece' was thrown around a great deal—but the praise was justified. First-time solo director Watanabe had created a gorgeous tale of morality, romance, and violence–a dark look at the lives of outlaws that's shot like an independent film."

In January 2015, television writer Kyle Mills of DVD Talk awarded the series five stars upon review. He stated, "Regardless of the medium, be it live action television, film, or animation, Cowboy Bebop is simply one of the finest examples of storytelling ever created." In his review, he describes the finale as "one of the best in television history", referring to it as a "widely revered" ending that "still sparks fan conversation, resonating with viewers 15 years on". He closes by writing, "Cowboy Bebop ends with a bang."

In his 2018 review of the series, Paste critic John Maher wrote, "It feels like a magnum opus produced at the pinnacle of a long career despite being, almost unbelievably, Watanabe's first series as a director. It is a masterwork that should justly rank among the best works of television of all time." It was also placed at #1 on the publication's list of the "50 Best Anime Series of All Time".

On review aggregator Rotten Tomatoes, the series has an approval rating of 100% based on 23 reviews. The website's critical consensus reads, "Blending a head-spinning array of genres and references, Cowboy Bebop is an anime television classic that must be experienced."

In an April 2019 interview with Diego Molano, creator of Victor & Valentino, he said that Cowboy Bebop was the first anime he "obsessed over", as he spent time tracking down VHS tapes of the show in high school. He also argued that this series showed him "how cinematic and emotional animation can be".

=== Accolades ===
At the 1999 Anime Grand Prix awards for the anime of 1998, Cowboy Bebop won two first place awards: Spike Spiegel was awarded the best male character; and Megumi Hayashibara was awarded the best voice actor for her role as Faye Valentine. Cowboy Bebop also received rankings in other categories: the series itself was awarded the second best anime series; Faye Valentine and Ed were ranked the fifth and ninth best female characters respectively; "Tank!" and "The Real Folk Blues" were ranked the third and fifteenth best songs respectively; and "Ballad of Fallen Angels", "Speak Like a Child", "Jamming with Edward" and "Mish-Mash Blues" were ranked the second, eighth, eighteenth and 20th best episodes respectively.

At the 2000 Anime Grand Prix awards for the anime of 1999, Cowboy Bebop won the same two first place awards again: best male character for Spike Spiegel; and best voice actor for Megumi Hayashibara. Other rankings the series received are: second best anime series; sixth best female character for Faye Valentine; seventh and twelfth best song for "Tank!" and "Blue" respectively; and third and seventeenth best episode for "The Real Folk Blues (Part 2)" and "Hard Luck Woman" respectively. In the 2000 Seiun Awards, Cowboy Bebop was awarded for Best Media of the Year.

A 2004 poll in Newtype USA, the US edition of the Japanese magazine Newtype, asked its readers to vote the "Top 25 Anime Titles of All Time"; Cowboy Bebop ranked second on the list, after Neon Genesis Evangelion, placing it as one of the most socially relevant and influential anime series ever created. During that same year, Cinefantastique listed the anime as one of the "10 Essential Animations", citing the series' "gleeful mix of noir-style, culture-hopping inclusiveness and music". In 2007, the American Anime magazine Anime Insider listed the "50 Best Anime Ever" by compiling lists of industry regulars and magazine staff, and Cowboy Bebop topped the list. In 2012, Madman Entertainment compiled the votes of fans online for "The Top 20 Madman Anime Titles" and ranked Cowboy Bebop at seventh.

Cowboy Bebop has been featured in several lists published by IGN. In the 2009 "Top 100 Animated TV Series" list, Cowboy Bebop, labelled as "a very original – and arguably one of the best – anime", was placed fourteenth, making it the second highest ranking anime on the list after Evangelion, and one of the most influential series of the 1990s. In 2011, Bebop was ranked 29th in the "Top 50 Sci-Fi TV Shows" list, once again being the second-highest ranking anime on the list after Evangelion. In 2006, Cowboy Bebop's soundtrack was ranked first in the "Top Ten Anime Themes and Soundtracks of All-Time" list, with the series being commented as "one of the best anime ever and certainly is tops when it comes to music." Spike Spiegel was ranked fourth in the "Top 25 Anime Characters of All Time" article. IGN Movies also placed Cowboy Bebop in its list of "10 Cartoon Adaptations We'd Like to See".

=== Analysis ===
The series has been subject to study and analysis since its debut, with the main focus being on its style and mixture of genres. Miguel Douglas, describing the series style in a review, said that "the series distinctly establishes itself outside the realm of conventional Japanese animation and instead chooses to forge its own path. With a setting within the realm of science fiction, the series wisely offers a world that seems entirely realistic considering our present time. Free from many of the elements that accompany science fiction in general—whether that be space aliens, giant robots, or laser guns—the series delegates itself towards presenting a world that is quite similar to our own albeit showcasing some technological advances." Daryl Surat of Otaku USA, commenting on the series' appeal, said that it was "that rare breed of science-fiction: 'accessible'. Unlike many anime titles, viewers weren't expected to have knowledge of Japanese culture—character names, signs, and the like were primarily in English to begin with—or have seen any other anime series prior." Michelle Onley Pirkle, in her book Science Fiction Film, Television, and Adaptation: Across the Screens, said that "Cowboy Bebop is taking a new take on genre, not by creating unique images and sounds, but by playing 'freely' with, 'remixing', or adapting the images and sounds of other familiar genres in a dynamic way." Robert Baigent, writing for the Graduate Journal of Asia-Pacific Studies, said that the series' appeal likely stemmed from the trend in anime to emulate Western fiction.

== Legacy ==
In March 2009, the print and web editions of The A.V. Club called Cowboy Bebop "rightly a huge hit", and listed it as a gateway series to understanding the medium of anime as a whole. Suskind said: "It was unlike anything the genre had seen before. It even approached its music differently. The show kicked off with a wormhole of a theme song, and the soundtrack moves so seamlessly through genres, from rock to country to pop to jazz to funk, it's shocking to learn that one set of musicians is behind it all". In an interview, producer Sean Akins also stated that the series "created a whole new world". "It's hard for me to quantify the impact that I think it has had. It changed anime. I think people began to think about what shows would be cool. I think it redefined cool within animation, not only in Japan but in the States". One of the series' main animators, Tensai Okamura, went on to create his own anime in 2007: Darker than Black. Okamura used his experience from Cowboy Bebop to write the screenplay of Darker than Black, leading to narratives composed of two episodes similar to Japanese dramas.

American filmmaker Rian Johnson has cited Cowboy Bebop as a visual influence on his films, most notably Brick (2005). Ender's Game writer Orson Scott Card also praised the series. He stated that the series is "better than most sci-fi films out there". He goes on to say that he "found this series brilliant, but what held me was a combination of strong relationship-based storytelling, a moody visual style that never got old and really smart dialogue".

After the creation of the series, an interviewer asked Watanabe if he had any plans to create more Cowboy Bebop material. Watanabe responded by saying that he does not believe that he "should just keep on making Cowboy Bebop sequels for the sake of it". Watanabe added that ending production and "to quit while we're ahead when people still want more" is more "in keeping with the Bebop spirit". In a later interview from 2006 with The Daily Texan, Watanabe was asked if there would ever be more Cowboy Bebop. Watanabe's answer was "someday ... maybe, someday".

In May 2020, composer Mason Lieberman partnered with Sunrise and Funimation to produce an official Cowboy Bebop charity track for COVID-19 relief. This track was released on vinyl and featured the return of original series composer Yoko Kanno, the original recording band Seatbelts, and a collection of forty other special musical guests.

== Bibliography ==
- Clements, Jonathan; McCarthy, Helen (2006). The Anime Encyclopedia: A Guide to Japanese Animation Since 1917 (Revised and expanded ed.). Berkeley, Calif.: Stone Bridge Press. ISBN 978-1933330105.
- Camp, Brian; Davis, Julie (2007). Anime Classics Zettai!: 100 Must-See Japanese Animation Masterpieces. Berkeley, Calif.: Stone Bridge Press. ISBN 978-1-933330-22-8.

Preceded by Kodomo no Omocha (April 5, 1996 – March 27, 1998)	TV Tokyo Friday 18:00 Time Slot Cowboy Bebop (April 3, 1998 – June 26, 1998)	Succeeded by Hatsumei Boy Kanipan (July 3, 1998 – January 29, 1999)
