= List of RahXephon episodes =

RahXephon is an anime television series produced by Bones and directed by Yutaka Izubuchi. It was broadcast in Japan on Fuji Television from January 21, 2002, to September 11, 2002. In keeping with the musical theme of the series, episodes are called "movements" and each volume of DVD is called an "orchestration". Each episode has a title screen that provides an English title for that episode, which generally does not correspond to a translation from the Japanese title. In addition to the 26 regular episodes, one recap episode was aired, and one episode was released as an (OVA).

The original air dates are schedule dates; these are calendar dates until the April series break, when Fuji Television moved RahXephon from Monday afternoons into a Tuesday late night anime block. Episodes 10 through 26 started at 25:55, which is at 1:55 a.m. Wednesday. This means that the calendar dates of the first and last episode airings are 21 January 2002 and 11 September 2002, respectively. Stations in the Fuji Network System affiliate Tōkai Television Broadcasting network started airing the series in the late night but moved it to late afternoons after the same series break. RahXephon thus remained both a late night and late afternoon anime series throughout its original run.

== Episode list ==
No.	Title	Directed by	Written by	Storyboarded by	Original release date
1	"Invasion of the Capital – Over Lord"; Transliteration: "Shuto shinkō" (Japanese: 首都侵攻 – OVER LORD -)	Tomoki Kyoda	Yutaka Izubuchi	Yutaka Izubuchi	January 21, 2002
Ayato Kamina, Hiroko Asahina, and Mamoru Torigai are on their way to a chemistry test by train with a woman who had been following Ayato. The train suddenly crashes, leaving Hiroko and Mamoru injured. After leaving to find help, Ayato is distressed upon seeing Tokyo suddenly being invaded by futuristic aircraft fighters, though a giant Dolem named Allegretto was later sent to defend the capital. In the rubble, Ayato mysteriously encounters Reika Mishima, nostalgic of her appearance. In the subway, federal agents have come to arrest Ayato, but the mysterious woman manages to save him. Ayato declines to go with her and boards a train with Reika, reaching a special station called "The Shrine of Xephon" under Tokyo Bay. Once inside, they find an area covered by a blue sky and a giant egg resting in a pool of water. The Dolems singing above affect Ayato, but Reika breaks through them with a song of her own. The egg suddenly cracks, revealing wings inside.
2	"God and Man Awaken – Awakening"; Transliteration: "Shinjin mezameru" (Japanese: 神人目覚める – AWAKENING -)	Masahiro Andō	Fumihiko Takayama	Masahiro Andō	January 28, 2002
The RahXephon is summoned by Ayato and finishes defeating the invaders before defeating the Dolem named Fortissimo in battle. Ayato is then taken home by his mother Maya Kamina, who insists that there were no such things floating in the sky. After school the next day, Reika tells Ayato the invasion was not a dream. At night, the stalker invites Ayato to meet with her at a park, and tries taking him out of the city. Meanwhile, Reika, at the shrine, reawakens the RahXephon, and Ayato and the stalker end up at the shrine. Ayato is brought inside the RahXephon, and is affected into causing the RahXephon to resonate with the Dolems. Ayato's mother arrives at the shrine and he is surprised to see her there, but it turns out that she is not what she appears to be.
3	"City of Two – Welcome to our town" Transliteration: "Futari no machi" (Japanese: 二人の街 – Welcome to our town -)	Akitoshi Yokoyama	Yukari Kiryū	Tensai Okamura	February 4, 2002
Ayato is hindered in his escape by Fortissimo. The stalker, now recognized as Haruka Shitou, is held safe by the RahXephon, but Reika stands on its shoulder as it is hit by an energy blast. The RahXephon crushes Fortissimo to pieces and then reaches outside the barrier of Tokyo Jupiter, ending up at an abandoned town near the barrier. After gathering some food, Ayato and Haruka take shelter in a fishing boat for the night. Haruka reveals the truth about the world to Ayato, mentioning that he has time lapsed for twelve years. The following day, Ayato goes off on his own and receives a call via payphone from his mother, telling him to not be compelled by a group of people who will try to. Haruka finds him to tell him the barrier separates his home city from the outside. Haruka later ignites the boat on fire to signal contact with the TERRA Organization.
4	"His Own Watch – Watch the year hand" Transliteration: "Jibun no tokei" (Japanese: 自分の時計 – Watch the year hand -)	Yasushi Muraki	Yōji Enokido	Yasushi Muraki	February 18, 2002
Ayato is transported by aircraft carrier to the base of the TERRA Organization. Although he is kindly introduced to Quon Kisaragi and Makoto Isshiki, Ayato is locked up because he is considered a threat. Quon, noticing a threatening timbre, foresees a Dolem, in which the organization does all it can to exterminate it. Failing to do so, the Dolem infiltrate the carrier. Ayato, in a panic, summons the RahXephon, urging him to obliterate the Dolem.
5	"Paradise Across the Ocean – On Earth As It Is In Heaven"; Transliteration: "Nirai Kanai" (Japanese: ニライカナイ – On Earth As It Is In Heaven -)	Ikurō Satō	Yōji Enokido	Tomoki Kyoda; Tomomi Mochizuki	February 25, 2002
Ayato's distressed feelings causes the RahXephon to petrify. Itsuki Kisaragi and Souichi Yakumo come up with a plan to resolve the situation. After the two see him as no longer a threat, Itsuki escorts him, bringing Quon along, to see Sayoko Nanamori. She takes Ayato to the household of Professor Shougo Rikudo, where he is to reside with Megumi Shitou, much to her dismay. As she shows him around town, a downpour occurs, forcing them to take shelter for a while before return in back home. Haruka later shows up at the house with Elvy Hadhiyat, who is in a drunken stupor and tries to flirt with Ayato. Rikudo helps Ayato to settle in, revealing that he reminds Megumi to "not do unto others".
6	"Obliterated Cities – Lost Songs Forgotten Memories"; Transliteration: "Shōmetsu toshi" (Japanese: 消滅都市 – Lost Songs Forgotten Melodies -)	Akitoshi Yokoyama	Ichirō Ōkouchi	Akitoshi Yokoyama	March 4, 2002
Jin Kunugi and Shirou Watari attend a press conference, leaving Souichi in charge of operations. After Kim Hotal insults Ayato for being useless in the organization, Megumi explains to Ayato that Kim's parents were killed by a Dolem in Australia. Itsuki and Sayoko ask Ayato to run some tests with the RahXephon. Kim find outs, with a clue given by Quon, where the Dolem might be approaching. Though Ayato was not willing to give her the revenge she desires, he decides to fight on behalf of his sympathy for Kim. When Ayato faces the Dolem at night, he is soon sunken underground. As he calls out for Reika, he emerges back up to defeat the Dolem.
7	"Day of Assembly – Phantom In The Cloud"; Transliteration: "Atsumaru hi" (Japanese: 集まる日 – Phantom In The Cloud -)	Yasushi Muraki	Ichirō Ōkouchi	Yasushi Muraki	March 11, 2002
Kunugi, Watari, and Makoto bring with them Johji Futagami, who wants to start an exclusive investigation on the TERRA Organization, and he is sent to Nirai-Kanai for observations. The Alpha Squadron, replenished with new pilots, along with Ayato, take on a Dolem, which its legs are only visible. Meanwhile, Futagami meets Rikudo, trying to pry out information concerning Ayato. Although Elvy destroys the legs of the Dolem, it appears that the Dolem is hovering. Ayato steps in to assist Elvy, though he is trapped within the clouds. With all of his might, he blasts the Dolem to pieces.
8	"Bitterly Cold Holy Night – The Dreaming Stone"; Transliteration: "Kōru seiya" (Japanese: 凍る聖夜 – The Dreaming Stone -)	Tomoki Kyoda	Yōji Enokido	Tensai Okamura	March 18, 2002
Itsuki gives out an invitation for a Christmas party at his place at night. Snow has begun to fall for the first time on Nirai-Kanai. Haruka gives Ayato a pair of gloves to wear for the cold weather. An envious Megumi reveals to Kim that Haruka had separated from a previous lover long ago, but she had kept a present stashed in her drawer all this time. Sayoko, wearing a gemstone necklace given to her from Itsuki, is responsible for creating the snowfall out of anguish. She becomes the nucleus of a Dolem named Sforzando, creating a field of ice and snow. Ayato is hesitant to fight back with the RahXephon due to this. Reika appears by his side, giving him the encouragement to destroy the Dolem while saving Sayoko in the process. It is implied that the pair of gloves was the present that Haruka had stashed ever since.
9	"Small Shrine of Time – Sanctuary"; Transliteration: "Toki no hokora" (Japanese: 時の祠 – SANCTUARY -)	Ikurō Satō	Shō Aikawa	Shōji Kawamori	March 25, 2002
On New Year's Day, Ayato, Quon, and Haruka go to the beach. While on a boat trip, after Haruka takes a dive into the water, Ayato and Quon glimpse at Reika near a lighthouse. The two then run off together, finding a shrine on the island. Haruka, after finding out from Futagami that the shine has led people to be spirited away, desperately tries to search for Ayato and Quon. Ayato finds himself falling from the sky toward Tokyo Jupiter and Quon appears before Reika as an illusion, but they are able to make their way out from hearing Haruka hum a song from outside the shrine.
S	"Memory of Wing – Memory"; Transliteration: "Tsubasa no kioku" (Japanese: 翼の記憶 – Memory -)	N/A	N/A	N/A	April 9, 2002
A recap episode aired after the series break that coincides with the 1 April start of a new Japanese fiscal year.
10	"Sonata of Reminiscence – War In The Remembrance"; Transliteration: "Tsuioku no sonata" (Japanese: 追憶のソナタ – War In The remembrance -)	Masahiro Andō	Yukari Kiryū	Masahiro Andō	April 17, 2002
Kunugi takes a rare day off, and Quon seems to be forgetting something at his place. When Ayato listens to a recording of Quon playing the violin, he senses a vibe of dissonance. Futagami tells Kunugi a story that a subordinate soldier stationed in Japan used a fusion bomb during the Mulian war, destroying a city as a consequence. Kunugi later board a cruise to meet with his wife, though Ayato and Megumi assume her as his daughter. There, the wife explains that she will be leaving Japan very soon, and she gives Kunugi the last page of Quon's song that was dedicated to him. Kunugi later goes to Quon at a cemetery, asking her to play the song in remembrance of his daughter, Michiru, who was killed during the Mulian war.
11	"Wicked Circuit – Nightmare"; Transliteration: "Kyoja kairo" (Japanese: 虚邪回路 – NightMare -)	Tomoki Kyoda	Chiaki J. Konaka	Tomoki Kyoda	April 24, 2002
Ayato struggles inside the RahXephon as a Dolem begin to swallow him up. He somehow briefly encounters Hiroko and Mamoru in an arcade, but the former tries to make a move on him, causing him to run off. He then chances upon Haruka, who seductively urges him not to hold back his desire for her. As he returns home to his mother for dinner, the television newscaster sends a subliminal message to make contact with the TERRA Organization. Maya tells him that he was destined to become the instrumentalist of the RahXephon, but Ayato denies this and flees into the forest where he meets Reika once again. She helps him return to the real world, despite his desires, and prompting him to destroy the Dolem.
12	"The Black Egg – Resonance"; Transliteration: "Kuroi tamago" (Japanese: 黒い卵 – Resonance -)	Akitoshi Yokoyama	Chiaki J. Konaka	Akitoshi Yokoyama	May 1, 2002
Quon, having been in a comatose state, opens her eyes after Itsuki and Sayoko leave the laboratory. Ayato takes a walk with Futagami, who shows him a picture of Maya as the leader of the Mulians. Quon, missing from the laboratory, escapes with Reika, who is directly connected to her through her memories. A Dolem is suddenly located, and Ayato is dispatched to search for it. As the Dolem engulfs the RahXephon, Quon reaches through her voice for a black egg that seems very similar to the egg Ayato found inside Tokyo Jupiter, but she has yet to be awaken. Ayato is then able to pass through the Dolem, as he slices it in half.
13	"Human Specimen #1 – Sleeping Beauty"; Transliteration: "Ningen hyōhon dai 1-gō" (Japanese: 人間標本第1号 – Sleeping Beauty -)	Ikurō Satō	Ichirō Ōkouchi	Tensai Okamura	May 8, 2002
A Dolem is seen to be in orbit in the sky, but seems immobile. Sayoko is curious to know how and why Quon appeared in the RahXephon with Ayato. Haruka begins to investigate Quon, yet her past is the one further examined. Futagami shows Haruka an envelope of medical charts for the first human specimen experiment. Later at night, Itsuki makes a move on Haruka, but Ayato walks in on them. Quon senses the call of the Dolem in the sky, displaying how she and Maya are directly connected. Ayato uses the RahXephon to pierce through the Dolem. It is revealed that Quon was the first human specimen experiment.
14	"The Boy In The Mirror – Time After Time"; Transliteration: "Kagami no naka no shōnen" (Japanese: 鏡の中の少年 – Time After Time -)	Masahiro Andō	Hiroshi Ōnogi	Masahiro Andō	May 22, 2002
Helena von Bähbem has learned more about Quon's state of awakening than what Itsuki had intended. Futagami informs Haruka that Rikudo had an unknown daughter that had left Tokyo at seventeen years of age, changing her family name to Kamina. A Vermilion is shipped to the base for Elvy to test out, though Souichi refuses her to use it in combat, resulting in an argument. Ayato, overhearing the argument, finds out that he is in fact a Mulian. The Vermilion is launched from the base when another Dolem approaches, then the RahXephon follows behind when a second Dolem appears. The two are then trapped in a masked sky, unable to sense the Dolems. Reika startles Ayato by controlling the RahXephon on its own, shooting at Elvy which rebounds and shatters the masked sky. Elvy defeats the Dolems by herself, and Ayato is frustrated for not being needed in combat anymore.
15	"The Children's Night – Childhood's End"; Transliteration: "Kodomo-tachi no yoru" (Japanese: 子供たちの夜 – Child Hood's End -)	Mitsuo Iso	Mitsuo Iso	Mitsuo Iso	May 29, 2002
A flashback occurs to when Makoto, Itsuki, and Helena were being raised at the Bähbem manor. Makoto finds a Mud Doll underground and decides to take it back to its mother and father, though Itsuki has his doubts and Helena is against the matter. Armed forces are later summoned to assassinate the Mud Doll, but Makoto creates a sound barrier to shield the firing of the rifles. The Mud Doll slowly deteriorates when it reaches outside the manor, saddening Makoto. In the present, Makoto looks back on that day, wondering if he would have the chance of meeting his parents someday.
16	"Island of Others – The Moon Princess"; Transliteration: "Tanin no shima" (Japanese: 他人の島 – The Moon Princess -)	Tomoki Kyoda	Hiroshi Ōnogi	Tomoki Kyoda	June 5, 2002
Megumi is looking forward to a promotion and to confess her love to Souichi. Ayato struggles to cope with the fact that Kunugi and Watari concealed the fact of him being a Mulian. Megumi is dismayed upon learning that Kim is dating him, leaving her heartbroken. Ayato feels betrays that Haruka hid the truth from him. Quon, revealing to Ayato that she is also a Mulian, convinces him to set off for Tokyo with her in the RahXephon, despite Haruka's protests and much to Megumi's surprise.
17	"Return to the Labyrinth – Ground Zero"; Transliteration: "Meikyū e no kikan" (Japanese: 迷宮への帰還 – Ground Zero -)	Sōichi Masui	Chiaki J. Konaka	Sōichi Masui	June 12, 2002
Elvy and Haruka go out in the Vermilion to intercept Ayato and Quon, but the Allegretto Dolem appears and fights the Vermilion, and they are unable to stop Ayato and Quon. The Vermilion then follows the RahXephon into Tokyo Jupiter. At the hospital, Ayato seems amnesiac and Quon is in a comatose state until the truth is uncovered, thanks to Reika. While Maya is driving Ayato home from the hospital, he encounters Hiroko and Mamoru. Though Ayato has spent six months at the TERRA Organization, he has only been away for a month in Tokyo Jupiter.
18	"The Bond of Blue Blood – The Memory of a Lost City"; Transliteration: "Aoki chi no kizuna" (Japanese: 蒼き血の絆 – The Memory Of A Lost City -)	Akitoshi Yokoyama	Chiaki J. Konaka	Akitoshi Yokoyama	June 19, 2002
Ayato, horrified of the sight of blue blood emitting from Maya, unknowing causes the RahXephon to act on its own at the base. Hiroko is also given proof that her friends and family were not what they appeared to be. The RahXephon is attacked by a Dolem named Falsetto yet is able to defeat it. Hiroko is scared away when Mamoru is among the Mulian society. As Ayato runs out of the house, he finds Hiroko, who begs him to escape with her. He summons the RahXephon to take him and her out of Tokyo Jupiter.
19	"Blue Friend – Ticket To Nowhere"; Transliteration: "Burū furendo" (Japanese: ブルーフレンド – Ticket to Nowhere -)	Yasuhiro Irie	Fumihiko Takayama	Tomoki Kyoda	June 26, 2002
Ayato and Hiroko escape from Tokyo Jupiter, however Futagami is following in their footsteps. Hiroko is too scared to tell Ayato about her blood turning blue. Ayato must work each day in order to obtain money for travel. The RahXephon senses a Dolem named Vibrato and Ayato is called forth to battle it. What Ayato did not know is that Vibrato is directly connected to Hiroko, so once Ayato destroys Vibrato, Hiroko is killed in the process, which deeply traumatizes him. Futagami finally catches up to Ayato, bringing him to Helena.
20	"The Battle of One Who Manipulates – Interested Parties"; Transliteration: "Ayanasu hito no tatakai" (Japanese: 綾なす人の戦い – Interested Parties -)	Susumo Kudō	Yōji Enokido	Masahiro Andō	July 3, 2002
Makoto replaces Kunugi as commander, and brings with him a new staff member, who so happens to be Reika. Mamoru seems to have successfully escaped from Tokyo, finding Ayato and meeting Megumi. A new Dolem named Obbligato is spotted near the base, and the Alpha Squadron set out for attack. It seems that Obbligato is directly connected to Mamoru, unbeknownst to Ayato. Donny Wong is killed in combat before the RahXephon forces Obbligato's retreat after tearing out its arm, and Jean-Patrick Shapplin, Cathy McMahon and Elvy consequently mourn for his death.
21	"The Carved Seal of Xephon – Goodbye My Friend"; Transliteration: "Zefon no kokuin" (Japanese: ゼフォンの刻印 – Good Bye My Friend -)	Ikurō Satō	Hiroshi Ōnogi	Sōichi Masui	July 31, 2002
Souichi and Haruka draws out Makoto's plans for another operation to break the barrier of Tokyo Jupiter. Quon is again settled in at the Bähbem Foundation. Mamoru recognizes Reika as Ixtli when she and Makoto come to see Ayato. Mamoru tries to gather information from Megumi to learn more about Ayato. After reading Hiroko's diary and hearing Megumi's voice message, Mamoru tells Ayato that one day he will be forced to decide between the paths of red and blue.
22	"Operation Jupiter Obliteration – Downfall"; Transliteration: "Mokusei shōmetsu sakusen" (Japanese: 木星消滅作戦 – Down Fall -)	Tomoki Kyoda	Hiroshi Ōnogi	Tomoki Kyoda; Tetsuya Watanabe	August 7, 2002
Makoto, after firing Haruka from the organization on behalf of Ayato's recent acts of theft, orders the operation to start one hour sooner than scheduled. When the operation commences, the barrier has been diminished. During this time, Ayato vigorously paints a portrait of Reika, while Quon passionately plays the piano having Ayato on her mind. Ixtli appears before Ayato and Quon in these forms in order to help them enter the tuning into her. Though Quon accepts to enter the tuning, Ayato rejects to do so. Souichi dismisses Makoto from his position as organization commander and federation observer for having undergone the operation with being permitted by the federation. Quon has now been awakened as the black egg begins to hatch, while Ayato encases the RahXephon in the white egg.
23	"From Here To Eternity – Where The Sweet Bird Song"; Transliteration: "Koko yori towa ni" (Japanese: ここより永遠に – Where The Sweet Bird Song -)	Masahiro Andō	Ichirō Ōkouchi	Masahiro Andō	August 14, 2002
Kunugi returns to the base as commander, and Haruka regains her position as well. Masayoshi Kuki threatens the TERRA Organization to hand over the RahXephon to him within one day or be faced against an approaching Dolem named Largo. Nirai-Kanai is evacuated onto the base thereafter, while Kunugi is the only person who stays behind in order to operate the defense systems. It is revealed that Kuki was Kunugi's superior officer during the Mulian war. Ixtli pleas for Ayato to enter the tuning into her, or else all humanity will be lost and forgotten. As it seems that Kunugi is overpowered by Largo, he activates the Jupiter system device as his secret weapon to backfire at Kuki, destroying the entire island.
24	"Doorway to the Tuning – Twin Music"; Transliteration: "Chōritsu e no tobira" (Japanese: 調律への扉 – Twin Music -)	Akitoshi Yokoyama	Chiaki J. Konaka	Akitoshi Yokoyama	August 21, 2002
All citizens and noncombatant passengers are to evacuate off the base, while Souichi is to lead his fleet unit into combat. Itsuki reveals to Haruka that Quon was one of the twin sisters at the shrine that has lied dormant without aging. Haruka explains to Ayato that he was her first love when they were fourteen years old. When a Dolem named Allegretto appears in the sky, the Alpha Squadron move out into formation. Shinobu Miwa is seen controlling this Dolem, ultimately defeating Cathy in battle. A furious Elvy then attacks and destroys Allegretto. As Mamoru uses Obbligato to interfere the Vermilion, Jean-Patrick jumps in to save Elvy at the cost of his life. After the previous false start, Ayato and Quon now dive into the tuning with both feet.
25	"God's Uncertain Music – Deus Ex Machina"; Transliteration: "Kami no futashika na oto" (Japanese: 神の不確かな音 – Deus Ex Machina -)	Sōichi Masui	Chiaki J. Konaka	Sōichi Masui	August 28, 2002
The RahXephon blasts out a rainbow wave directly at Obbligato from the heavens, sending a mass destruction all over the city. More casualties have risen, and many of the lives of fleet unit have diminished. Haruka and Kim are saddened when Elvy and Souichi are among those who have died in battle. Makoto is shot by Helena in front of Itsuki for being a defective cloned product of the foundation. Ayato and Quon are realized to be halves of the RahXephon, unveiling the purpose of their existences.
26	"Far Beyond Eternity – Time Enough For Love"; Transliteration: "Haruka kuon no kanata" (Japanese: 遙か久遠の彼方 – Time Enough For Love -)	Tomoki Kyoda	Hiroshi Ōnogi	Tomoki Kyoda	September 11, 2002
Ayato wakes up in the subway station when Quon is playing the piano. Itsuki is stabbed to death by Sayoko, but he dies contently knowing she killed him. Helena reveals to Sayoko that she was programmed to love Itsuki, though the latter denies this truth. The RahXephon was created by Ernst von Bähbem many millennia ago, which has been controlling the flow of time in the world. Maya comes to terms with the fact that Ayato wants Haruka more than he wants a pure Mulian world. Ayato defeats Quon in battle to return the world to one where the Mu never attacked, and he was not separated from Haruka. It is seen that Ayato and Haruka are married and have a daughter named Quon. Haruka gets off the phone with Megumi, and Ayato has just finished a painting of a girl in a yellow dress looking out over the sea. Haruka asks coyly who the girl in the picture is, and a post-credits sequence reveals that the girl that Ixtli copied her appearance from was that of a young Haruka.

== OVA ==
No.	Title	Directed by	Written by	Storyboarded by	Original release date
OVA	"Her and Herself – Thatness And Thereness"; Transliteration: "Kanojo to kanojojishin to" (Japanese: 彼女と彼女自身と – Thatness And Thereness -)	Tomoki Kyoda	Tomoki Kyoda	Tomoki Kyoda	August 7, 2003
The special Plusculus edition of the RahXephon video game contains a bonus episode called RahXephon Interlude: "Her and Herself" (ラーゼフォン間奏曲「彼女と彼女自身と」, RahXephon kansōkyoku: Kanojo to kanojo jishin to)/"Thatness and Thereness". It was re-released in Japan in 2007. Chronologically, this episode fits somewhere in the middle of the series, Though it was released a year after the series broadcast, the OVA fits between episodes 13 and 14 chronologically. This episode shows Quon's dialogue with her other self as a series of dream sequences. By the end of the episode, Quon remembers something crucial about her past and makes a decision for the future.

== Anime distribution ==
Television broadcast and Video on demand

Among the television networks and video on demand (VOD) services and that have broadcast or streamed RahXephon are:

Region	Network, station or service
Japan	Fuji Television and its FNS affiliate networks, except in the Kansai region.
Japan	Bandai Channel (Web VOD)
Kansai region of Japan	Sun (Kobe, Osaka)
Kansai region of Japan	KBS (Kyoto Prefecture)
Kansai region of Japan	TVN (Nara Prefecture)
Kansai region of Japan	BBC (Shiga Prefecture)
Kansai region of Japan	WTV (Wakayama Prefecture)
United States, Canada	Anime Network (TV broadcast, TV VOD and Web VOD.)
United States	G4 (USA: Anime Unleashed/Barbed Wire Biscuit. CAN: Not broadcast)
France, Luxembourg, Switzerland, Belgium (French)	Game One
France, Luxembourg, Switzerland, Belgium (French)	Mangas
Spain	Cuatro
Spain	Buzz
Portugal	SIC Radical
Republic of China	Animax

The initial nine volume Japanese release had DVD covers with art by Akihiro Yamada.

=== Home Media release ===
In Japan, the Media Factory DVD release started while the series was still airing. RahXephon a prelude (ラーゼフォン a prelude 前奏曲), containing a "making-of" documentary and trailers, was released as a prelude on 29 March 2002. Its content was used as bonus material in the international releases. The series itself was released on nine volumes of DVD, the first one on 31 May 2002.

The series and the movie were licensed internationally. ADV Films released the show as seven DVD volumes in the United States and United Kingdom. In addition to the Japanese bonus materials, ADV included interviews with some of their voice actors. Other distributors released the show in other regions and languages.

ADV Films announced new High-Definition DVDs for release in 2005; each volume was planned have one disc of HD video and another with both DTS 5.1 and Dolby 5.1 audio for the standard definition video. However, these were delayed and ultimately failed to be released. Media Factory released a DVD box in spring 2007 which included a HD DVD edition of the movie, new art by Akihiro Yamada, and a re-release of the OVA episode. On February 23, 2011, Media Factory released a Blu-ray box set of the series that included both Japanese and English audio as well as English subtitles.
