= List of RahXephon media =

This is a list of media from the Japanese science fiction series RahXephon.

RahXephon began production as an anime television series in 2001. A manga version, a novelization, soundtracks and an audio drama were published during and after the original broadcast, which lasted from January to September 2002. The series was released on DVD in Japan during its original broadcast, and was subsequently translated and both broadcast and released on DVD in other countries.

A television movie, a RahXephon video game, and an OVA episode were released a year later, in 2003. Characters, mecha and story from RahXephon were featured in a game in the Super Robot Wars series. Art books, guide books and additional novels were also released. This list includes video games and music, but not toys, hobby articles and other merchandise.

== Printed media ==
=== Manga volumes ===
The manga release started before the anime broadcast, so that the ending in one medium would not trail too far behind the other. The first chapter, or "mission", appeared in the magazine Monthly Sunday Gene-X in the October 2001 issue (released 19 September 2001); the final chapter was released two months after the airing of the last anime episode, in the December 2002 issue (released 19 November 2002).

The chapters were subsequently released in three compilation volumes which were translated and published internationally. These volumes contain the following chapters and extras. In addition, each publisher may have added certain notes and advertisements in the front and back of the volumes.

Volume 1

- Artist notes
- Mission 1: "Birth"
- Mission 2: "The Real World"
- Mission 3: "Ally"
- Mission 4: "Awakening"
- Mission 5: "Trust"
- After-word (by Yutaka Izubuchi)
- "Making of RahXephon" comic (an omake)

Volume 2

- Artist notes
- Mission 6: "Alone"
- Mission 7: "Choice"
- Mission 8: "Decision"
- Mission 9: "Paradise"
- Mission 10: "Destiny"
- "Making of RahXephon" comic 2

Volume 3

- Artist notes
- Mission 11: "Promise"
- Mission 12: "Prayer"
- Mission 13: "Summer Snow"
- Mission 14: "Destruction"
- Mission 15: "Holy One"
- Final mission: "Over the Rainbow" (Note: Named after the song "Over the Rainbow" from the movie The Wizard of Oz.)
- "Making of RahXephon" last

==== Available editions ====
Publisher	Language	Volume 1	Volume 2	Volume 3
Shogakukan (Japan)	Japanese	ISBN 4-09-157131-X	ISBN 4-09-157132-8	ISBN 4-09-157133-6
VIZ Media (Canada) (United States)	English	ISBN 1-59116-407-9	ISBN 1-59116-427-3	ISBN 1-59116-428-1
Chuang Yi (Singapore)	English	No ISBN listed	No ISBN listed	ISBN 981-260-099-X
Madman Entertainment (Australia) (New Zealand)	English	# 1978	# 1979	# 1980
Panini Comics (Planet Manga) (Italy)	Italian	# 37	# 38	# 39
Panini Comics (Génération Comics) (France)	French	ISBN 2-84538-230-8	ISBN 2-84538-284-7	ISBN 2-84538-322-3
Panini Comics (Germany)	German	ISBN 3-89921-557-5	ISBN 3-89921-558-3	ISBN 3-89921-677-6
Norma Editorial (Spain)	Spanish	ISBN 84-8431-853-2	ISBN 84-8431-854-0	ISBN 84-8431-855-9
Haksan Publishing (South Korea)	Korean	ISBN 89-529-7302-X	ISBN 89-529-7368-2	ISBN 89-529-7711-4
M&C Comics (Indonesia)	Indonesian	# 1327	# 1328	# 1329

=== Novelization ===
Hiroshi Ohnogi, one of the screenwriters on the TV series, has written a novelization in five volumes. These are published in English by DrMaster.

Volume	Japanese		English	
Volume	Release	ISBN	Release	ISBN
01	July 2002	ISBN 4-8401-0598-7	2005-08-25	ISBN 1-59796-000-4
02	August 2002	ISBN 4-8401-0615-0	2005-12-21	ISBN 1-59796-001-2
03	October 2002	ISBN 4-8401-0653-3	2006-02-25	ISBN 1-59796-002-0
04	December 2002	ISBN 4-8401-0687-8	2006-06-25	ISBN 1-59796-003-9
05	February 2003	ISBN 4-8401-0719-X	2006-11-15	ISBN 1-59796-004-7

=== Guide books ===
Two different illustrated guide books have been published.

- RahXephon Bible: Analysis Phase: English: ISBN 1-4139-0026-7, 14 October 2003. Japanese: ISBN 4-04-853518-8, June 2002. Contains information from the 19 first episodes, with summaries of the first 15. It contains episode notes, character pages and brief profiles of staff members.
- RahXephon Complete: Japanese: ISBN 4-8401-1019-0‚ March 2003. Covers all episodes, the OVA, movie and video game; in addition to character and episode guides, it contains longer interviews with staff members and a pair interview with directors Yutaka Izubuchi (RahXephon) and Hideaki Anno (Neon Genesis Evangelion); this book is only available in Japanese.

There are also two guide books which go more into details.

- Ryusuke Hikawa: RahXephon Complete Capture (Note: Literal, unofficial, title translation) (ラーゼフォン完全攻略, Rāzefon kanzen kōrya ku) : Japanese: ISBN 4-19-861675-2, April 2003. This book contains essays about RahXephon. The author is an anime critic and hosts the Anime Maestro television segment for NHK.
- Bandai: RahXephon Blue Sky Fantasia Official Guide Book (ラーゼフォン 蒼穹幻想曲 公式ガイドブック, Rāzefon soukyū gensokyoku kōshiki guidebook): Japanese: ISBN 4-7542-2025-0, September 2003. Official guide to the RahXephon video game.

=== Art books ===
There are also art books available.

- RahXephon Official Illustration Collection: Japanese: ISBN 4-8401-0744-0, 18 April 2003. Contains illustrations made for magazines, DVD covers, soundtracks and other works, concept art, as well as some images made to appear in the series itself.
- RahXephon Art Works: Japanese: ISBN 4-7973-2316-7, 1 July 2003. Contains more illustrations by Akihiro Yamada. These are mostly character design line drawings, with some location, interior and prop concept art. The book also contains Yamada's DVD cover front images (used in Japan).

=== Other books ===
- Chouhei Kanbayashi: RahXephon – The Time Controller (Note: Preliminary title according to editor, Koji Mitarai (2003). RahXephon Bible: Analysis Phase. ADV Films. p. 86. ISBN 1-4139-0026-7. Alternative translation: The Time Tuner) (ラーゼフォン – 時間調律師, Rāzefon – jikan chouritsu shi) : Japanese: ISBN 4-19-905120-1, September 2002. A novel set in the RahXephon universe; written by a veteran, award-winning, science fiction and horror writer.
- Hiroshi Ohnogi: RahXephon – The Dreaming Egg (ラーゼフォン―夢みる卵, Rāzefon – yumemiru tamago) : Japanese: ISBN 4-8401-1001-8, November 2003. This book contains six short stories, close to novella length, each focusing on past events in the lives of selected characters, like Jin Kunugi, Itsuki and Haruka.

== Video games ==
=== RahXephon video game ===
RahXephon for PS2, regular edition cover

The RahXephon video game, Blue Sky Fantasia (ラーゼフォン 蒼穹幻想曲, Rāzefon Soukyū Gensokyoku), was released for the PlayStation 2 by Bandai Japan on 7 August 2003; there is no English version. The game is mainly an adventure game with some action sequences similar to Zone of the Enders. The player moves around in a 3D environment, learning about places and relationships, and moving the story toward one of forty different endings. In-game characters are voiced by their original Japanese voice actors and are animated while speaking. Cut scenes feature hand-drawn animation, some of which was made for the game. In the action sequences the player fights Dolems with the RahXephon; weapons and other RahXephon variants can be unlocked.

The special Plusculus edition of the video game contains an extra booklet and a DVD with the RahXephon OVA episode.

=== Super Robot Wars ===
The RahXephon characters and mecha have appeared in the game Super Robot Wars MX (2004), mixed with those from other shows. RahXephon's story-line also had a major role in the game's overall mixed plot, as the series' climax was also the climax of the game. In the game, the RahXephon is a very powerful unit, with the power of a Super Robot but much of the agility of a Real Robot; although not quite as overwhelming as the Zeorymer, it is one of the more effective units.

RahXephon characters and mecha re-appear in the game Super Robot Wars Scramble Commander the 2nd (2007).

== Music ==
=== Theme songs ===
Production	Song name	Credit
RahXephon (TV series) opening	"ヘミソフィア" ("Hemisphere")	By Yuho Iwasato and Yoko Kanno. Performed by Maaya Sakamoto for episodes 2-3 and 5-25. Instrumental version for episode 4.
RahXephon (TV series) ending	"夢の卵" ("Yume no Tamago", "Fledgling Dream")	By Ichiko Hashimoto. Different verses from the Japanese and English versions performed by Ichiko and Mayumi Hashimoto for episodes 1 through 25.
RahXephon (TV series) final episode ending	"Before you Know"	Instrumental by Ichiko Hashimoto.
RahXephon: Pluralitas Concentio (movie) ending	"Tune the Rainbow"	By Yuho Iwasato and Yoko Kanno. Performed by Maaya Sakamoto.

=== Albums ===
- RahXephon O.S.T. 1 (2002)
- RahXephon O.S.T. 2 (2002)
- RahXephon O.S.T. 3 (2002)
- RahXephon Pluralitas Concentio O.S.T. (2003)
- RahXephon CD Box (2007) (VICL-62311): A re-release of the soundtrack albums. The movie soundtrack has some new previously unreleased tracks, and some tracks removed.

=== Singles ===
- "Hemisphere" (2002)
- "Tune the Rainbow" (2003)
