= List of RahXephon albums =

This is a list of music albums and singles from the Anime series RahXephon.

== Albums ==
=== RahXephon O.S.T. 1 ===
RahXephon O.S.T. 1

Soundtrack album by Ichiko Hashimoto
- Released: May 2, 2002
- Label: Victor Entertainment; VICL-60870 (Japan, CD)
- Producer: Yoshimoto Ishikawa

Ichiko Hashimoto chronology
Miles Blend (2001)	RahXephon O.S.T. 1 (2002)	RahXephon O.S.T. 2 (2002)

RahXephon O.S.T. 1 is the first soundtrack album released for RahXephon. Except for the opening track, Hemisphere, all music and lyrics are by Ichiko Hashimoto and performed by her. She is joined by her sister Mayumi Hashimoto on the last track.

"Yume no Tamago (Egg of the Dream)", the last track, was used as the ending theme for all but the last episode. The musical theme from this track also appears as one of the musical themes in the ending of the last episode, "Before you know". It is also used by "Second Sorrow" in episode 19 "Blue Friend".

==== Track listing ====
1. "Hemisphere" (Maaya Sakamoto, Yoko Kanno, Yuho Iwasato)
2. "Members Only"
3. "Avant, Rendezvous"
4. "Misty Midnight"
5. "He Feels Uneasy"
6. "Fate of Katun"
7. "12 Years"
8. "Lovely Night"
9. "Temptation"
10. "Flew Over"
11. "Face Lost"
12. "Invisible Motion"
13. "The Chariot"
14. "Their Daily Lives"
15. "Bad News"
16. "Winning Sound of Her"
17. "Magic Handling"
18. "Mulians"
19. "The Tremendous Egg"
20. "Solitudes"
21. "Yume no Tamago (Egg of the Dream)"

=== RahXephon O.S.T. 2 ===
RahXephon O.S.T. 2

Soundtrack album by Ichiko Hashimoto
- Released: June 21, 2002
- Label: Victor Entertainment; VICL-60871 (Japan, CD)
- Producer: Yoshimoto Ishikawa

Ichiko Hashimoto chronology
RahXephon O.S.T. 1 (2002)	RahXephon O.S.T. 2 (2002)	RahXephon O.S.T. 3 (2002)

RahXephon O.S.T. 2 is the second soundtrack album from the anime series RahXephon. All music and lyrics are by Ichiko Hashimoto and performed by her. She is again joined by her sister Mayumi Hashimoto on the song "Yume no Tamago (Egg of the Dream)". Houko Kuwashima, the voice of Quon, also sings on this album.

Hashimoto described this as "more organic" than the first soundtrack, and it contains some music that was recorded after the series had begun airing.

The theme of "La, la Maladie du Sommeil" is from Polovetsian Dances. This track is featured on the album Junsyoku Brilliant (緋色brilliant) (VICL-61796).

==== Content and use ====
The track "Huge Suites" (sample) features a melody played in turn by different instruments, over a snare drum rhythm and a counter-melody, beginning quietly and rising in a crescendo. This track thus shares some of its structure with Maurice Ravel's Boléro. The initial rhythmic pattern in "Huge Suites" is simpler than that in Boléro, consisting of only 6 beats. The track as a whole is more ornate, however, with transitions in melody theme and rhythmic pattern. While the main melody of Boléro transitions back and forth between two themes ( ), this track transitions back and forth between four themes. The first rhythmic change is at 1:23, coinciding with the third theme transition. At 2:00, the string section returns to the original rhythmic pattern while the percussion does not; the previous rhythm thus becomes a counter-rhythm. In contrast, Boléro keeps the same rhythmic pattern going all the way until the end. "Huge Suites" has its final transition at 2:18, where the counter melodies end and both the rhythm and theme dive into a crescendo that builds for the last 40 seconds of the track. The main theme from this track is also used for the song "Brave" on the next album.

==== Track listing ====
1. "Runnin'"
2. "l'Aile"
3. "Their Secret"
4. "A Few Memories"
5. "Protocols"
6. "La, la Maladie du Sommeil" Vocals: Houko Kuwashima and Ichiko Hashimoto.
7. "Adolescent"
8. "Quantum Corridor"
9. "TERRA"
10. "Huge Suites"
11. "Her Hatching"
12. "Orchestra Stalls"
13. "Synchronic Brake Down"
14. "Vanishing Jupiter"
15. "Flying Fighter"
16. "Ramblin'"
17. "Phantom of Theatre"
18. "Perfect Noise"
19. "The Other Stranger"
20. "Yume no Tamago" (Egg of the Dream) (English version)

=== RahXephon O.S.T. 3 ===
RahXephon O.S.T. 3

Soundtrack album by Ichiko Hashimoto
- Released: August 21, 2002
- Label: Victor Entertainment; VICL-60915 (Japan, CD)
- Producer: Yoshimoto Ishikawa

Ichiko Hashimoto chronology
RahXephon O.S.T. 2 (2002)	RahXephon O.S.T. 3 (2002)	Turned Perspective 1994-2001 (2002)

RahXephon O.S.T. 3 is the third and last soundtrack album from the anime television series RahXephon, but it is followed by the soundtrack to the RahXephon movie. All music and lyrics are by Ichiko Hashimoto and performed by her and supporting musicians. Houko Kuwashima, the voice of Quon, sings an intentionally distorted theme from Alexander Borodin's Polovetsian Dances on track 18 "Way to the Tune".

==== Content and use ====
The album opens on "Midday Dream", a slightly chaotic jazz improvisation that is followed by two tracks with shouting vocals: "Guten Morgen" and "First Explosion". "Mad Wing" takes the chaos to a crescendo. "Brave" has a fast-beat backing track heavy on percussions with occasional electric guitar solos and English vocals performed by Hashimoto; the melody is the main theme from "Huge Suites" on the previous album. Track 6 "Tailspins" is a fast-beat track that was used for the air battle in the series episode 1.

Tracks 7 through 12 are piano sonatas; the first one, "Innocent World", is playful and up-tempo while the rest are calmer, meditative pieces similar to "Solitudes" from the first album.

Track 14 "Writes herself" was used for episode 19, as was track 16 "Second Sorrow", which is a version of the ending theme "Yume no Tamago". Track 15 "Reverse Point" is a piece performed by a double string quartet (an octet) and used for the planning scene in episode 21.

"Object Float" is used in the "tuning", along with "My Soundscape", which also appears in some "eyecatches" (commercial bumpers) in previous episodes. "Way to the Tune" starts out as a distorted version of Gliding Dance of the Maidens from Polovetsian Dances performed by Houko Kuwashima, receding into synthesizer ambience.

"Before you know" is used for the ending credits of the final episode. It starts out as symphonic piece with french horns, strings, harp and wood blocks. Clarinette and flute then play the lead, joined by strings. A string bridge takes the track to a transition where the lead is played by drawn strings accentuated by pizzicato violin, while an electronic hi-hat and brush beat fades into the symphony. The melody transitions into a version of "Yume no Tamago", brought to the fore with tubular bells and grand piano, while a pronounced snare drum is added to the beat.

The final track "Previous notice" is a short and fast composition for piano and drum kit that was used for the episode previews.

==== Track listing ====
1. "Midday Dream"
2. "Guten Morgen"
3. "First Explosion"
4. "Mad Wing"
5. "Brave"
6. "Tailspins"
7. "Innocent World"
8. "Forbidden Ponds"
9. "Secret Seeker"
10. "Inner Take"
11. "Door Of Adolescence"
12. "Over The Senses"
13. "Dense Blue Water"
14. "Writes Herself"
15. "Reverse Point"
16. "Second Sorrow"
17. "Object Float"
18. "Way to the Tune"
19. "My Soundscape"
20. "Before You Know"
21. "Previous Notice"

=== RahXephon Pluralitas Concentio O.S.T. ===
RahXephon Pluralitas Concentio O.S.T.

Soundtrack album by Ichiko Hashimoto
- Released: 23 April 2003
- Label: Victor Entertainment; VICL-61105 (Japan, CD)

Ichiko Hashimoto chronology
Turned Perspective 1994-2001 (2002)	RahXephon Pluralitas Concentio O.S.T. (2003)	Ub-X (2003)

RahXephon Pluralitas Concentio O.S.T. is the official soundtrack album from the anime movie RahXephon: Pluralitas Concentio, part of the RahXephon series.

The album does not contain all the music featured in the film, but the "missing" music can be found on the other RahXephon sound track albums.

All music, except for the single tracks "Tune the Rainbow" and "Hemisphere", is composed by Ichiko Hashimoto.

==== Track listing ====
===== Original version =====
Tracks 1 through 12 on the original version are original compositions for the movie, while tracks 13 through 21 are reprises from the TV series soundtracks.

1. "Yesterday, today"
2. "Opening title"
3. "Sleeping beauty"
4. "Lost memories"
5. "Tenderness"
6. "Fatal request"
7. "Her decision"
8. "Loud conductor"
9. "Words at abyss"
10. "Déjà vu"
11. "Promised world"
12. "Tune the Rainbow"
13. "Fledgling dream" (English version of "Yume no tamago")
14. "Katun no sadame" (Fate of Katun)
15. "L'aile"
16. "Melancholia"
17. "Un rêve ~ Yume"
18. "La maladie du sommeil"
19. "Brave"
20. "Hemisphere"
21. "Yume no tamago"

===== Box set version =====
1. "Yesterday, Today"
2. "Opening Title"
3. "Sleeping Beauty"
4. "Tenderness"
5. "Lost Memories"
6. "Blue"
7. "Yume No Tamago" (Piano version)
8. "Fatal Request"
9. "Her Decision"
10. "Loud Conductor"
11. "If, We Were"
12. "Words At Abyss"
13. "Deja Vu"
14. "Promised World"
15. "Tune the Rainbow"

== Audio drama ==
An audio drama titled RahXephon Sound Drama was released on CD in Japan in September 2002. It consists of one teaser track, 13 scene tracks, two music tracks, and one "preview" track. The story is about Ayato receiving a box of chocolates as an anonymous Valentine's Day gift, and the quest to find out who sent it.
