= RahXephon: Pluralitas Concentio =

2003 Japanese film by Tomoki Kyoda and Yutaka Izubuchi

- Theatrical release poster
- Directed by: Yutaka Izubuchi (Supervising Director); Tomoki Kyoda
- Written by: Tomoki Kyoda
- Screenplay by: Chiaki J. Konaka; Ichirō Ōkouchi; Hiroshi Ōnogi; Yōji Enokido; Fumihiko Takayama; Tomoki Kyoda; Yutaka Izubuchi
- Story by: Yutaka Izubuchi
- Produced by: Maki Horiuchi; Masahiko Minami; Shiro Sasaki; Kenji Shimizu; Tatsuji Yamazaki
- Music by: Ichiko Hashimoto
- Production company: Bones
- Release date: April 19, 2003
- Running time: 115 minutes
- Country: Japan
- Language: Japanese

RahXephon: Pluralitas Concentio (Japanese: ラーゼフォン 多元変奏曲, Hepburn: Rāzefon: Tagen Hensōkyoku) is a 2003 Japanese mecha anime film directed by Yutaka Izubuchi and Tomoki Kyoda which was produced by studio Bones. It is a movie adaptation of the 2002 anime television series RahXephon, retelling the story of the series with new animation and plot elements. It was theatrically released in Japan on 19 April 2003. The film received mixed reviews, with reviewers recommending it to fans of the anime but criticizing it as inaccessible to newcomers.

== Plot ==
Ayato Kamina and his classmate Reika Mishima are in middle school and are a young couple, still dealing with some awkwardness. However, the sudden appearance of visitors from an alternate dimension, the "Mu", tears the two apart. All of Tokyo is enveloped in the giant hemispherical Absolute Barrier, which looks very similar to Jupiter, and they become separated into the world inside and the world outside.

Three years later, Ayato, who was left inside, has become a high school student. He has been taught that the world outside has been obliterated and feels as though his memories of Reika are a distant vision. But one day, invaders from outside attack, and Tokyo is engulfed in the fires of war. And as Ayato runs about in confusion, a woman appears before him. The woman says her name is Haruka Shitow and tries to take Ayato outside the Absolute Barrier, saying, "I'll tell you the truth."

The truth is, her identity is his former girlfriend, Haruka Mishima. But now, she is 12 years his senior...The power of the Absolute Barrier had delayed the advancement of time inside. That was something Ayato's mother, Maya Kamina, had plotted solely for the purpose of his awakening. Maya was in fact the leader of the Mu. And as Ayato was the tuner of time, who held the fate of the world in his hands...a person who had the ability to reform the world that had been torn apart into the Mu and Earth.

Ayato awakens during his escape with Haruka. He is drawn to the giant in the image of a God, "RahXephon", and ends up aboard it. After the RahXephon destroys the Mu super-weapon, "Dolem", it escapes Tokyo with Haruka. Having the Mu's Dolem with the RahXephon. Haruka can only support Ayato in his battles, not even being able to bring herself to tell him who she is.

There was an even more cruel fate awaiting the two. When Ayato achieves true awakening and become one with the RahXephon, the world stands upon the brink of destruction. In order to prevent this from happening, Haruka must kill Ayato, whom she has finally found once again. Will Haruka be able to tell him how she feels and save Ayato and the world?

== Characters ==
- Ayato Kamina. 17 years old. An instrumentalist capable of synchronizing with the mysterious giant God, RahXephon. He has both Mu and Earth blood in him. He is currently chasing after the vision of the girl who went missing.
- Haruka Shitow. 29 years old. A member of the TERRA Intelligence Division, who infiltrated Tokyo Jupiter and led Ayato to the outside world. She is actually the grown Haruka Mishima.
- Quon Kisaragi. A girl of unknown age, who continues to sleep buried in flowers in the "Chamber of Eternity." The other instrumentalist capable of conducting the tuning of the world.
- Maya Kamina. Ayato's mother. Actually a Mulian who lost her qualification as an instrumentalist. She leads the Mu towards the tuning of the world and desires Ayato's awakening.
- Hiroko Asahina. 17 years old. Ayato's friend from school. She is dating Mamoru, but she secretly cares for Ayato. She embarks on a runaway trip with Ayato, but the color of her blood already turned blue...

== Production ==
The film is directed by Tomoki Kyoda, who had directed six episodes of the TV series (1, 8, 11, 16, 22 & 26) and acted as assistant director with Soichi Masui. Izubuchi acted as Chief Director on this movie, but was not heavily involved in its production. Most of the staff members involved with the TV series worked on the movie, and it was distributed by Shochiku. The producers were Masahiko Minami, Shiro Sasaki, Maki Horiuchi, Kenji Shimizu and Tatsuji Yamazaki.

The movie quickly reveals mysteries that were developed slowly in the TV series and makes changes to the plot. It begins with a prologue showing previously un-shown events, followed by a couple of expository scenes. The final 30 minutes have the most plot changes and new scenes, and they end with a new epilogue. The rest of the movie consists mainly of abridged scenes from the original series, sometimes with characters replaced or with different motivations and dialogue. The plot establishes the link between the Kamina and Mishima families and other storylines that were prominent in the original TV series were reduced or removed. One prominent distributor promoted the movie as an "encore" — an extra performance at the end of the series, rather than as a replacement.

== Music ==
The film score was composed and conducted by Ichiko Hashimoto. The soundtrack, consisting of 11 songs plus vocal tracks, was released in Japan on April 23, 2003, by Victor Entertainment. Maaya Sakamoto was in charge of the theme song, titled "Tune the Rainbow." The song was composed and produced by Yoko Kanno, with lyrics penned by Yuho Iwasato.

== Reception ==
Pluralitas Concentio had a more mixed reception than the TV series. Christian Nutt was not excited about the TV series but found the movie to be better: Despite "too much cutting and chopping", he wrote that "the creators have done the best they can with the material." He added: "the last scene is very touching. It's a big improvement over the TV show." Efrain Diaz Jr. of IGN called the movie a "valiant effort", but preferred the TV series and asked, "Why even bother with the movie?"

Carlo Santos, writing for Anime News Network, recommended the movie both as an "endcap to a remarkable series" and as a sample for those yet to watch it. While Chris Beveridge also recommended the movie as an addition to the series, he did not recommend it as a sample for newcomers, "since some of the best revelations are given away so quickly..."

Indeed, reviewers who were not familiar with the series complained about the movie's lack of coherence. Mitchell Hattaway of DVD Verdict "got lost about ten minutes in", considered the movie a waste of money for anybody but RahXephon completists and wrote that "Bones Animation Studio is guilty of contempt for its audience." Janet Crocker of Animefringe was confused by the plot as well, but was less confused on the second viewing and looked forward to watching the TV series. She called the movie "intellectually refreshing and visually beautiful" and recommended it "even to non-mecha people like me".

Pluralitas Concentio was nominee for the Seiun Award for Best Dramatic Presentation in 2004, but lost to The Lord of the Rings: The Two Towers.
