= Amanda Clarke (disambiguation) =

Amanda Clark or Clarke may refer to:

- Amanda Clark, sailor
- Emily Thorne, the protagonist of Revenge whose birth name is Amanda Clarke
- Amanda Clarke, character in Jane by Design
- Mandy Clark, voice actress
