= Ichiko Hashimoto =

Ichiko Hashimoto is the name of:

- Ichiko Hashimoto (musician) (born 1952), Japanese jazz pianist, composer and singer
- Ichiko Hashimoto (born 1972?), singer who was part of the group Aurora Gonin Musume
