= Mandy Clark =

American actress

- Born: June 9, 1982 (age 43); Houston, Texas
- Occupations: Voice actress, Digital artist, Designer
- Spouse: Cory Martin
- Family: Victoria Clark (sister); Larry Clark (father)

Mandy Clark (born June 9, 1982) is an American voice actress, primarily noted for her role as Tomo Takino in the English-language dub of Azumanga Daioh. She auditioned for ADV Films in the year 2000 without prior drama training, and landed her first role in an episode of Excel Saga. She retired from voice acting in 2004 in order to begin attending college. In early 2006 she returned to Houston and has since graduated. She works as a freelance digital artist and was married in 2009.

== Notable roles ==
- Arisu Fujisaki in Angelic Layer
- Tomo Takino in Azumanga Daioh
- Mizuki Inaba in Full Metal Panic!
- Cosette Sara and Anne Anzai in Excel Saga
- Erukarena in Orphen (Season 2: Revenge)
- Kirara Mitsuboshi in Najica Blitz Tactics
- Rei Ayanami, Pen-Pen in Neon Genesis Evangelion (Director's Cut)
- Mawata Awayuki in Pretear
- Potée in the Sorcerer Hunters OVA
- Reika Mishima in RahXephon
- Meihou and Donghua in Saiyuki
- Mayuko Inoue in Ushio & Tora
- Sister Anna in Chrono Crusade (Ep. 1–15)

== Minor roles ==
- Ghost Cat in Panyo Panyo Di Gi Charat
- Madonna in Megazone 23
- Nao in Chance Pop Session
- Fifi in Princess Nine
