= RahXephon =

Japanese anime television series

- Cover art from the third volume of ADV's DVD release of RahXephon

ラーゼフォン (Rāzefon)
- Genre: Mecha, romance
- Created by: Bones, Yutaka Izubuchi
- Manga
- Written by: Takeaki Momose
- Published by: Shogakukan
- English publisher: AUS: Siren Visual; NA: Viz Media; SG: Chuang Yi
- Magazine: Monthly Sunday Gene-X
- Original run: August 19, 2001 – November 19, 2002
- Volumes: 3
- Anime television series
- Directed by: Yutaka Izubuchi
- Produced by: Daisuke Kawakami; Go Haruna; Katsuji Nagata; Masahiko Minami; Shirō Sasaki
- Written by: Chiaki J. Konaka; Ichirō Ōkouchi; Hiroshi Ōnogi; Yōji Enokido; Fumihiko Takayama; Yutaka Izubuchi; Mitsuo Iso
- Music by: Ichiko Hashimoto
- Studio: Bones
- Licensed by: AUS: Siren Visual; NA: Sentai Filmworks; UK: 101 Films
- Original network: FNS (Fuji TV)
- English network: NA: Anime Network; US: G4 (Anime Unleashed)
- Original run: January 21, 2002 – September 11, 2002
- Episodes: 26
- Novel series
- Written by: Hiroshi Ohnogi
- Published by: Media Factory
- English publisher: US: DrMaster
- Imprint: MF Bunko J
- Original run: July 2002 – February 2003
- Volumes: 5
- Video game
- Publisher: Bandai
- Genre: Adventure, Action
- Platform: PlayStation 2
- Released: August 7, 2003
- Original video animation

Her and Herself (彼女と彼女自身と) / Thatness and Thereness
- Directed by: Tomoki Kyoda
- Written by: Tomoki Kyoda
- Music by: Ichiko Hashimoto
- Studio: Bones
- Released: August 7, 2003
- Runtime: 15 minutes
- Other
- RahXephon: Pluralitas Concentio (film)

RahXephon (Japanese: ラーゼフォン, Hepburn: Rāzefon) is a Japanese anime television series created and directed by Yutaka Izubuchi. The series follows 17-year-old Ayato Kamina, his ability to control a mecha known as the RahXephon, and his inner journey to find a place in the world. His life as a student and artist in Tokyo is interrupted by a mysterious stalker, and an invasion between strange planes invading the city and its similarly strange defenses.

The series was animated by Bones and it aired on Fuji TV for twenty-six episodes from January to September 2002. It was produced by Fuji TV, Bones, Media Factory and Victor Entertainment. The series received critical acclaim and was subsequently translated, released on the DVD and aired in several other countries, including the United States. A 2003 movie adaptation RahXephon: Pluralitas Concentio was directed by Yutaka Izubuchi and Tomoki Kyoda, with plot changes and new scenes. The series was also spun into novels, an extra OVA episode, an audio drama, a video game, illustration books and an altered manga adaptation by Takeaki Momose.

Director Izubuchi said RahXephon was his attempt to set a new standard for mecha anime, as well as to bring back aspects of 1970s mecha shows like Reideen The Brave.

== Setting ==
The backstory of RahXephon is a fight against multi-dimensional invaders known as Mulians (known as Mu (ムー, Mū)). The Mu are visually indistinguishable from humans, however they carry a genetic marker called the "Mu phase" which turns their blood blue and causes some memory loss when they mature.

The story reveals that two Mu floating cities appeared above Tokyo and Sendai around the end of 2012. The ensuing conflict between Mu and humans escalated into nuclear warfare, and the Mu enveloped Tokyo and the outlying suburbs within a spherical barrier resembling Jupiter, referred by outsiders as "Tokyo Jupiter" ("Tōkyō Jupita"). The barrier has a time dilating effect, which causes time inside Tokyo Jupiter to slow down to one-fifth compared to the outside time, and allowed the Mu to secretly take control of Tokyo, using the area as their base of operations. The goal of the human forces outside of Tokyo Jupiter is to build up their strength to penetrate through and invade Tokyo Jupiter and stop the Mu while surviving their attacks.

Although RahXephon is part of the mecha genre of anime, its "mechas" are not mechanical. The mechas, used by the Mu and called Dolems, are made out of clay, like golems or various other beings from mythology/folklore. Each is bound to a certain Mulian; however, some are also bound to certain human hosts, called "sub-Mulians".

The dominant theme of RahXephon is the music changing the world. The Dolems are animated by a mystical force connected to music; most of the controlling Mulians appear to be singing. A Dolem attacks while singing, and sometimes the attack is the song itself. The RahXephon can also attack by having its pilot—the "instrumentalist"—sing a note. This unleashes force waves that cause massive destruction. Each Mulian Dolem has an Italian name referring to musical notations, such as, Allegretto, Falsetto, or Vivace. The ultimate goal of the RahXephon is to "tune the world." Izubuchi says the name RahXephon lacked a real meaning, but that he now explains it as composed of Rah as the origin of Ra according to Churchward, X as the unknown variable or X factor, and -ephon as a suffix for instrument from "-phone".

== Plot ==
The most important plot line of the series is the unusual relationship between Ayato Kamina and Haruka Shitow. Although Haruka appears to be a stranger to Ayato at first, the series reveals that they knew each other from before the beginning of the story.

Ayato is a boy who was unknowingly conceived with the help of the Bähbem Foundation living in Tokyo with his adoptive mother, Maya Kamina. Ayato had met Haruka on a trip outside of Tokyo, and they continued to see each other when they returned to school in Tokyo. At this time, Haruka's family name was Mishima.

However, during what later became known as the Tokyo Jupiter incident, Haruka and her pregnant mother were away on a holiday trip while Ayato was caught inside the city. Years later, after giving birth to Haruka's sister Megumi, Haruka's mother remarried and their family name became Shitow. Meanwhile, Maya modified Ayato's memories to make him forget Haruka. The series makes clear that all of the humans within Tokyo Jupiter are subject to the same kind of mental control, thinking that they are all that's left of mankind after a devastating war. Ayato is haunted by visions of Haruka, which he manifests in his art. Ixtli, RahXephon's soul, also adopts Haruka's appearance and family name (Mishima) to guide Ayato, but takes a different given name—Reika.

The story begins as Tokyo comes under attack by invading aircraft while a mysterious woman, later revealed to be Haruka, stalks Ayato. By this point, Haruka has grown considerably older than Ayato and everyone else who is inside of Tokyo Jupiter because of the time dilation. Because of this and her now having a different last name, Ayato does not recognize Haruka and also initially does not fully trust her, but he gradually re-discovers his love for her as the series progresses, and he learns of everything that has happened. At the end of the series, Ayato's RahXephon merges with Quon's, allowing him to modify the past by "re-tuning the world" to make it so that he and Haruka are never separated. In the final sequence of the series, the adult Ayato is seen with his wife Haruka and their infant daughter Quon.

== Characters ==
This section represents the story from the television series and may differ from other works.

TERRA operations and research staff

At the beginning of RahXephon, Ayato Kamina is a modest 17-year-old living in Tokyo. He is an average student, who enjoys painting and spending time with his classmates Hiroko Asahina and Mamoru Torigai. He has affectionate relationship with his mother, strained by her long-hour work.

During the sudden attack on Tokyo, Ayato hears the singing of his classmate Reika Mishima. She leads him to a giant egg containing the RahXephon. Haruka Shitow, an agent of the defense research agency TERRA (acronym for Tereno Empireo Rapidmova Reakcii Armeo, broken Esperanto for Earth Empire Rapid Response Army), brings Ayato and the RahXephon to their headquarters.

Ayato moves in with Haruka's uncle Professor Rikudoh and pilots the RahXephon against the attacking Dolems. Quon Kisaragi, a mysterious girl living with chief researcher Itsuki, seems to share some of Ayato's artistic talent. Ernst von Bähbem of the Bähbem Foundation sponsors TERRA through the Federation, the successor of the United Nations.

While most characters are introduced by the end of episode 7, RahXephon continues to characters development and reveals their mysteries and relationships through heavy use of foreshadowing.

== Production and media ==
RahXephon was initially produced as a TV series. A manga version, novels, soundtracks and an audio drama were published during the original broadcast. A movie, an OVA episode, art books, and guide books were also created. Characters, mecha and story from RahXephon were featured in three video games.

=== TV series ===
Yutaka Izubuchi was a successful anime supervisor and designer focusing on costume, character and mechanical design, notably in the Gundam and Patlabor series. His friend and former Sunrise colleague Masahiko Minami, producer and president of Bones, had suggested Izubuchi to direct something.

"Yume no Tamago"
Sample from Hashimoto's ending theme, featuring synthesiser ambients and vocals

"Huge Suites"
Sample from near the beginning of "Huge Suites", one of Hashimoto's classically scored compositions

"Runnin'"
Hashimoto's jazz compositions range from experimental to the more mainstream, like "Runnin'".

Izubuchi finally agreed and RahXephon became his first directing job. Izubuchi returned to the classic mecha shows of the 1970s and 1980s and wanted to make a show of that type updated with advances in anime production as well as adding his own personal ideas. He wanted to "set a new standard in the field" of mecha anime to show his "own standard" and capabilities as a creator-showrunner. Media Factory, Fuji TV. and Victor Entertainment joined Bones as production partners. After planning the story and designing characters and locations, a core group was expanded to a full production staff that completed the show, primarily working together — a departure from the trend of outsourcing anime production.

The original music, except for the opening theme, is composed by Ichiko Hashimoto; she was initially approached to compose some of the score and replied that she wanted to compose all of it. She also plays Maya and performs the closing theme together with her sister Mayumi. The opening theme "Hemisphere" is composed by Yoko Kanno and sung by Maaya Sakamoto, who plays Reika. Hashimoto's compositions range from piano sonatas and acoustic chamber music to experimental jazz, hard rock, and ambience that crosses the border into sound design. She also includes more mainstream jazz and orchestral music played with both acoustic and electronic instruments.

=== Movie ===
A television movie version of RahXephon called Pluralitas Concentio was directed by Yutaka Izubuchi and Tomoki Kyoda. Kyoda had directed three episodes of the TV series and acted as assistant director with Soichi Masui. Izubuchi acted as Chief Director on this movie, but was not heavily involved in its production. Most of the staff members involved with the TV series worked on the movie, and it was distributed by Shochiku. The producers were Masahiko Minami, Shiro Sasaki, Maki Horiuchi, Kenji Shimizu, and Tatsuji Yamazaki.

In the manga, characters differ from their anime counterparts in both visual design and characterization.

The movie quickly reveals mysteries that were developed slowly in the TV series and makes changes to the plot. It begins with a prologue showing previously unseen events, followed by a couple of expository scenes. The final 30 minutes contain the most plot changes and new scenes, ending with a new epilogue. The rest of the movie consists mainly of abridged scenes from the original series, sometimes with characters replaced or with different motivations and dialogue. The link between the Kamina and Mishima families and other storylines that were prominent in the original TV series were reduced or removed. One prominent distributor promoted the movie as an "encore"—an extra performance at the end of the series, rather than as a replacement.

=== Manga ===
The manga was illustrated and written by Takeaki Momose. Momose was one of the candidates for character designer on the series, but Izubuchi wanted Akihiro Yamada to do the original designs, and Hiroki Kanno got the job of adapting them for animation. With the manga Momose got the opportunity to re-design the characters into his own style and make changes in characterization and story, as well as adding "fan service". It was serialized in Shogakukan's seinen manga magazine Monthly Sunday Gene-X from August 18, 2001, to November 19, 2002.

Oto the anime In the anime series, Reika is a mysterious and distant figure; in the manga Reika is a more comical figure who grew up as Ayato's adoptive sister with a darker origin. The anime series shows Megumi competing with Haruka for Ayato's affections, a role taken by Reika in the manga. In the manga the rate of time dilation is different. Te year outside Tokyo is 2033 rather than 2027.

== Reception ==
The anime series originally aired on stations in the Fuji Television network and its affiliates, except in the Kansai region where independent UHF stations aired it instead. Starting with episode 10, some stations moved the series from the afternoon to after midnight, but other stations moved it from late night to afternoon. RahXephon thus remained both a "late night anime" and afternoon anime throughout its original run.

According to its distributor, the series "captivated millions in Japan" and "[drew] in viewers by the tens of thousands." The series won the award for best anime television series at the 7th Animation Kobe fair. It was considered popular enough that a TV movie version was commissioned and aired.

Internationally, the series was translated and released on DVD. It was purchased for airing by television stations and made available on video on demand services in several countries. In the United States, the DVDs were released around the theatrical release of another Bones production, Cowboy Bebop: The Movie. The distributor claimed that RahXephon was met with "strong sales and extraordinary critical response in the U.S."

=== TV series reviews ===
The series was generally well received by English-language reviewers. While some reviewers only judged the show on its own merits, others compared it with varying favor against shows such as Brain Powerd, Megazone 23, and Neon Genesis Evangelion.

Protoculture Addicts editor Claude J. Pelletier chose RahXephon as one of the top 3 anime television series of 2002, and Miyako Matsuda agreed, noting mystery, technology, and romance. Christian Nutt of Anime Jump offered a contrary opinion: "RahXephon's characters fell flat and the grind of its scenario didn't inspire much curiosity, despite some initially awesome ideas". En Hong, on the other hand, found the characters to be skilfully developed and believable as "self-conscious entities and not just parts to be filled for the story to progress", and Charles Solomon called them "engaging".

Mike Toole of Anime Jump was impressed by the music, animation and character design; as was Protoculture's Martin Ouellette. Solomon noted the "strikingly original mecha designs" and Anime Boredom's John Huxley noted the "unusual yet elegant" mecha and the "fluid computer-enhanced"—but not CGI-looking—animation.

RahXephon's "brief but not unwelcome" comrdic moments went over well with Huxley, and he found the romance "a million miles away from the cheery antics of Love Hina or Ranma ½" and "for the most part thoroughly believable".

Chris Beveridge of Anime on DVD found the final episodes beautiful both in visual style and story, "with the raw emotions coming out of it, in both languages". Huxley also liked the conclusion: "Despite falling short of the mark in a few areas this is a satisfying conclusion to a good series." On the plot resolution he wrote that RahXephon "keeps the audience guessing right up until the final credits and beyond" but that "the clues are all there" for the viewer to piece together. Anime News Network columnist Zac Bertschy called RahXephon a "paragon of responsible storytelling (...) No loose strings are left; we see the conclusion of every character’s storyline." He added that the English voice work "raised the bar across the board."

=== Movie reviews ===
The TV movie had a more mixed reception than the TV series. Christian Nutt was not excited about the TV series but found the movie to be better: Despite "too much cutting and chopping", he wrote that "the creators have done the best they can with the material." He added: "the last scene is very touching. It's a big improvement over the TV show." Efrain Diaz Jr. of IGN called the movie a "valiant effort", but preferred the TV series and asked "why even bother with the movie?"

Carlo Santos, writing for Anime News Network, recommended the movie both as an "endcap to a remarkable series" and as a sample for those yet to watch it. While Chris Beveridge also recommended the movie as an addition to the series, he did not recommend it as a sample for newcomers, "since some of the best revelations are given away so quickly..."

Indeed, reviewers who were not familiar with the series complained about the movie's lack of coherence. Mitchell Hattaway of DVD Verdict "got lost about ten minutes in", considered the movie a waste of money for anybody but RahXephon completists and wrote that "Bones Animation Studio is guilty of contempt for its audience." Janet Crocker of Animefringe was confused by the plot as well, but was less confused on the second viewing and looked forward to watching the TV series. She called the movie "intellectually refreshing and visually beautiful" and recommended it "even to non-mecha people like me".

=== Book reviews ===
Eduardo M. Chavez of Anime on DVD was not impressed by the first volume of the manga, especially when compared to the TV series; he rated it "C minus", though he said it could have worked as a "parody dōjinshi". After the disappointment of volume one, Chavez was pleasantly surprised by the story in the following volumes, and called it a "story that grew up with its characters", giving it a "B plus".

The five-volume novelization was translated to English, but the other novels were not. This translation was marred by a lack of copy editing in the first volume, which was rated "D" by Santos. The situation was somewhat improved in the second volume, but reviewers did not recommend the novelization as an alternative to the animated versions — only as a source for learning more about the characters and their internal motivations.

== Comparisons with other anime ==
Some reviewers and the director have compared RahXephon with other anime shows. Some of these shows also have staff common with RahXephon.

=== Reideen the Brave ===
The director of RahXephon has said this series is meant emulate Reideen for the modern day. As such there are similarities between Raideen and RahXephon, particularly in the titular "robots".

- The monsters in both shows are made from earth and rock which is brought to life.
- Akira Hibiki and Ayato Kamina both have mothers who are from a race called the "Mu". This in turn means that both Akira and Ayato have Mu blood.
- Akira and Ayato both "meld" into a surface in order to enter the cockpit of their respective robot. Akira enters via Reideen's forehead; Ayato can enter the RahXephon both directly and through a portal that is separate from the body of the RahXephon.
- The Raideen and the RahXephon both are portrayed as intelligent, sentient beings and possess similar general aesthetics, particularly the human-like face that is covered on the sides. Both can attack with their voices, and can form a bow with arrows as well as a sword that protrudes out of their right arms.

Both have appeared in the Super Robot Wars series, taking particular significance in Super Robot Wars MX where many characters note that Reideen and RahXephon are similar existences, and Reideen the Brave has since been remade into Reideen. The two also appear together in Super Robot Wars: Scramble Commander the 2nd.

=== Neon Genesis Evangelion ===
While some English-language reviewers did not mention the popular mecha anime Neon Genesis Evangelion in their reviews of RahXephon, others compared the two explicitly. Some reviewers noted similarities between the series' protagonists and their style and execution of events. John Huxley noted an episode with "soul searching" sequences reminiscent of Neon Genesis Evangelion with a "hint of Twin Peaks".

After reviewing the first five episodes, Mike Pinsky of DVD Verdict wrote that much of RahXephon was "ripped off completely" from Neon Genesis Evangelion and although finding it to be a good show, he ruled that "This Evangelion Lite tastes good enough, but is much less filling." Christian Nutt of Anime Jump had seen the entire show when he wrote that "One of my least favorite aspects of RahXephon is its aping of Evangelion". In Protoculture Addicts Miyako Matsuda agreed that the shows were similar, but compared the two in RahXephon's favor: "it is very similar to Evangelion, but in many ways more original and exotic." In the same magazine, Martin Ouellette went as far as calling RahXephon and Neon Genesis Evangelion "imitation", but was so impressed that he exclaimed "the imitation has surpassed the original!"

Some reviewers favoured RahXephon because of its more active protagonist and clearer ending: "Like Evangelion, you have to bend and warp your brain around this thing, but unlike Evangelion, if you think about it, it all makes sense" wrote Zac Bertschy. Huxley praised RahXephon for including action sequences in the ending, providing "a more balanced experience". RahXephon's story and complex relationships were planned and written early in the production cycle. In contrast, Neon Genesis Evangelion's director stated that he did not know how the show would end, and production was influenced by the reactions that TV executives and viewers had to previous episodes. Although John Oppliger suggested stronger candidates for similarities than Neon Genesis Evangelion, he thought RahXephon's similarity to Neon Genesis Evangelion was intentional:

RahXephon actually borrows far more heavily from Megazone 23 than it does Evangelion, and even Evangelion could be said to be heavily influenced by Megazone 23. I think that in its effort to be purely artistic entertainment, RahXephon knowingly pays homage to both Megazone 23 and Evangelion in the same way Evangelion re-uses the concept of a boy piloting his father's giant robot that was used 20 years before in Mobile Suit Gundam, which itself borrowed the idea from even older shows like Tetsujin 28 and Mazinger.

John Huxley found "several similarities" with Neon Genesis Evangelion, but wrote that there were "many, more significant differences", and concluded that RahXephon "deserves to be recognised outside of its comparisons to a certain Hideaki Anno animation."

Some dialogue in the RahXephon anime series is reminiscent of Neon Genesis Evangelion; for instance, protagonist Ayato's very first line in the show is "Everything is all right with the world", which closely resembles the line "All's right with the world" from Robert Browning's Song from Pippa Passes, which serves as the motto of Eva's secret organization Nerv.

=== Production connections ===
Anno and Izubuchi, the chief directors of each show, both designed mecha appearing in Mobile Suit Gundam: Char's Counterattack (1988) and they worked together on the Cutie Honey (2004) live action movie. Izubuchi had also made some design drafts of the Evangelion units, but did not make the final designs. They gave an interview for one of the RahXephon guide books, and have a relationship that can be described as being old drinking buddies. Mitsuo Iso, a writer and key animator on Neon Genesis Evangelion, wrote and directed the RahXephon episode "The Children's Night"; Yoji Enokido wrote the screenplay for RahXephon's "Interested Parties" and Neon Genesis Evangelion's "The Day Tokyo-3 Stood Still". Takeshi Honda was also an animator on both shows. Gainax was one of many companies contracted for in-between animation work on episodes 6 and 26. Although no Japanese voice actors from Evangelion voiced characters in the Japanese version of RahXephon, both shows were re-dubbed into English by ADV Films, and both Allison Keith and Tiffany Grant voiced regular characters in both series.

=== Other anime ===
- AnimeNation's John Oppliger noted influences from Escaflowne, Evangelion, Revolutionary Girl Utena and "especially Megazone 23"
- Charles Solomon compared the premise of RahXephon with that of Dual! Parallel Trouble Adventure, but found RahXephon to be "better plotted and executed".
- Huxley found the Dolems to be "the star of the show with their bizarre, slightly disturbing designs" reminiscent of Grey.
- Anime Jump reviewer Mike Toole compared RahXephon with Brain Powerd on account of the "excellent music", design and a "frustratingly large cast and Byzantine plot", but found RahXephon "more focused". He thus disagreed with his colleague, Christian Nutt, who wrote that "[Brain Powerd] may not be as sexy, but it features a more heartfelt and original story".

== Legacy ==
After RahXephon, Izubuchi went back to design work. His assistant director, Tomoki Kyoda, became chief director on Eureka Seven. Mitsuo Iso went on from his experience on RahXephon to become the chief director of Dennō Coil. RahXephon has been referenced by at least one other anime series, which was also produced by Bones.

When asked whether robot anime following RahXephon had "lived up to the new era" Izubuchi answered "Partially yes and partially no" and regretted the focus being on financially safer remakes instead of on new creations.
