= List of RahXephon characters =

TERRA operations and research staff

This is a list of recurring characters and cast in the anime/manga/novel series RahXephon. Characters without speaking parts or who only appear in one episode or chapter are not included. The characters are first described as they appear in the TV series, followed by their portrayals in the other story versions.

== Main characters ==
=== Ayato Kamina ===
- Ayato Kamina (神名 綾人, Kamina Ayato)

Voiced by: Hiro Shimono (Japanese); Chris Patton (English)

At the beginning of the series, Ayato Kamina is a student and artist living with his mother in Tokyo. Most of his artwork shown in the series consists of drawings or paintings of a girl on a cliff looking towards the sea. He has birthmark-like symbols on his belly resembling runes, which are revealed to be a sign of his being a potential instrumentalist for the RahXephon.

After being taken from Tokyo by Haruka and the RahXephon, Ayato moves in with Rikudo Shougo, Haruka's uncle on Nirai Kanai. At first, this arrangement does not sit well with Ayato, as Haruka and her younger sister Megumi live in Rikudo's annex, but they slowly adapt to each other's presences. As a stranger from Tokyo Jupiter, Ayato struggles to find his place and acceptance in the outside world. Although he pilots the RahXephon in defending Nirai Kanai, he questions his abilities and self-worth. He also struggles with trying to piece together and understand his relationship with Haruka, handling the feisty Megumi, and interacting with the other TERRA personnel, who regard him with a broad spectrum of reactions, from acceptance and friendship to cool scientific interest to distrust and even contempt.

It is revealed that Quon is genetic provider of both Ayato and Itsuki Kisaragi while she is sleeping. Conceived with the help of Ernst von Bähbem and raised by Maya as an instrumentalist — someone who can successfully use the RahXephon to re-tune the world. There are several other instrumentalist candidates, but at this point of the series most have passed their ideal age.

At the end of the series, Ayato succeeds in becoming one with the RahXephon, and re-tunes the world. In this new world, the great dimensional split never happened, and Tokyo Jupiter never existed. Ayato is now an adult and married to Haruka and have an infant daughter named Quon.

In other versions

In the movie, Ayato is Maya's naturally conceived biological son. In this version, he has to remain in his position as a "Watcher of time" and can not return to the world.

In the manga, Ayato is not just the result of in vitro fertilization but also of in vitro growing; multiple tanks with Ayato clones growing inside them are shown.

=== Haruka Shitou ===
- Haruka Shitou (紫東 遙, Shitō Haruka)

Voiced by: Aya Hisakawa (Japanese); Monica Rial (English)

A 29-year-old officer within the TERRA organization, Haruka Shitou is partially responsible for aiding Ayato in leaving Tokyo Jupiter. Originally a captain in the Intelligence Division, she is promoted to Major in the Tactical Division.

Haruka is shown to have very strong feelings for Ayato and struggles at maintaining a relationship with him for many reasons. Her position within TERRA makes Ayato think that she is only using him because of his ability to pilot the RahXephon. Ayato's own personal struggles also create barriers for their relationship.

It is later revealed that the girl that Ayato is constantly drawing and painting is actually a young Haruka. They had fallen in love when they were younger. The earliest date when the show places them together is at August 10, 2011, at age 13. When the Tokyo Jupiter barrier was established (just after the end of 2012), Haruka was on a vacation in a different part of Japan. Ixtli uses Ayato's distorted memories of Haruka to create the form of Reika Mishima. Haruka aged much more than Ayato in the outside world due to Tokyo Jupiter's time dilation effect. She had a relationship with Itsuki Kisaragi, possibly due to his similarity to Ayato.

In other versions

There is no real difference between Haruka's portrayal in the series and in the movie.

In the manga, Haruka is more ditzy but has a similar role in the story until the end, where she is revealed to be a reincarnation of Reika.

=== Reika Mishima ===
- Reika Mishima (美嶋 玲香, Mishima Reika)

Voiced by: Maaya Sakamoto (Japanese); Mandy Clark (English)

Reika Mishima first appears in the series as the subject of one of Ayato's paintings. She then appears, in person, during the attack on Tokyo in episode 1. She leads Ayato to the RahXephon, and is shown to have some sort of connection to it via her singing.

Throughout the series, it is hinted that Reika is not a normal human being. She does not have a reflection unless she needs to, Ayato is able to call her at an unassigned phone number, and she appears to alter Ayato's classmates' memories to make them remember her. She later appears as an aide to Makoto Isshiki, apparently altering TERRA personnels' memories in the same fashion. It is revealed that Reika is actually Ixtli, the soul of the RahXephon, and that her appearance is a manifestation of Ayato's innermost desires. This enables him to connect with and fully use the RahXephon; in artistic terms, she is his muse. Her form is chosen to closely mimic that of a young Haruka Mishima (later Shitou) with whom Ayato had fallen in love. This is to ensure that the performer, or instrumentalist, is more cooperative to Ixtli and more trusting of her than would initially be the case. Ixtli appears to Quon as Reika at first but later takes the guise of Ayato as he has become very important to her.

Despite disappearing often, Ixtli/Reika Mishima is quite caring of Ayato, and will go the extra mile to see that he fully matures into his role as 'Ollin' and punishes those who would ruin her goal of a successful 'tuning'.

Although Ayato initially rejects Reika after he learns the truth about her and what she is, he later chooses to accept her and become one with the RahXephon, thus enabling him to re-tune the world.

Reika is the focus of an important and recurring visual leitmotif used throughout the series. She stands on a higher point, with her back facing Ayato, and slowly turns around to smile upon him. This image is also repeated in Ayato's paintings. The origin of the leitmotif is shown in the "Dandelion Girl Coda" at the end of the series.

In other versions

In the movie, Reika is one of the Watchers of Time, a 'soul' of one of the two RahXephons. Further complicating matters, Ayato and Haruka's granddaughter is also named Reika and appears identical to Reika Mishima.

In the manga, Reika is a more comical character who has grown up as Ayato's adoptive sister and who is openly jealous of any woman who gets between them. It is revealed that Reika is a Mulian miko who was forced unprepared into a ritual involving the RahXephon. The ritual failed disastrously, due to Reika's spiritual emptiness and destrudo. She is trapped in a cycle of reincarnation, and is destined to die prematurely. Despite Ayato's best efforts, Reika dies in his arms after they promise each other to meet again in a later life. As Haruka and Itsuki prepare to get married, it is revealed that Haruka is actually Reika's reincarnation and that Itsuki is Ayato's. This is a partial reversal of the TV series, where Reika takes Haruka's image.

=== Quon Kisaragi ===
- Quon Kisaragi (如月 久遠, Kisaragi Kuon; Quon al Padis)

Voiced by: Hōko Kuwashima (Japanese); Kira Vincent-Davis (English)

Quon Kisaragi is a mysterious young girl who speaks the first words of the TV series and is shown meeting Ayato in episode 4. Her standard expression of surprise or agreement is "Ra-ra" (or "La-la") and most of her dialogue is cryptic and musically themed. She and Ayato do not connect romantically, but she displays a level of both physical and interpersonal comfort and intimacy with Ayato. She is also one of the few people who never treats Ayato as a curiosity or an annoyance, and she seems to have an understanding of his situation and what his eventual role is, calling him "Ollin" ("motion" in Nahua).

Like Ayato, she has the marks of a potential instrumentalist. She and Ayato are both shown undergoing examinations, and while outside of her home she wears a vest-like device called a Life Module. Quon is skilled in playing both the violin and piano. She also is portrayed as curious about music that other people listen to on headphones, often taking them off to listen to the music.

It is later revealed that Quon is a Mulian. She is the sister of Maya Kamina, and the genetic provider of both Ayato Kamina and Itsuki Kisaragi. When she entered the human world, she slept for quite a while and stayed young, while Maya is awake and grew older. Because of this, she is often called the "Sleeping Beauty".

In episode 9, Quon goes with Ayato into a shrine (shaped like a Ryukyuan tomb) where she learns that she is also "Ollin". After a period of lying comatose she goes with Ayato to Tokyo Jupiter, where she finds her own black RahXephon. At the end of the series, she merges with this RahXephon, and appears to battle Ayato after he merges with his RahXephon. She is eventually absorbed into Ayato, and he re-tunes the world. In the new world, the infant child of Ayato and Haruka is named Quon and also has pink hair, suggesting that Quon is reborn into the re-tuned world.

Design

In the designs created by Akihiro Yamada and adapted by Hiroki Kanno, Quon is shown wearing a short dress with long sleeves, the Life Module, high heeled shoes, a thigh strap (worn like a garter), a beret, and a parasol, leading to a stereotypical "French" look. In some illustrations, like Yamada's DVD 2 cover design (used in France and Japan, but not in the initial U.S. and UK release), Quon wears a frilly lace-trimmed dress and stockings, which with the parasol complete a "Gothic Lolita" look. In Ouran High School Host Club, another anime series by Bones, the "French" otaku Renge is shown cosplaying as Quon on one occasion.

In other versions

In the movie, Quon is a failed instrumentalist who is forced against her will to destroy the world of the humans. She spends most of the movie asleep, awakening only for her final conflict with Ayato.

In the manga, as in the TV series, Quon and Maya show friendship and love towards each other, but here Quon goes into battle against the malevolent Maya.

=== The RahXephon ===
The RahXephon is a bipedal humanoid mecha. It is about 50 m high, immensely strong, and capable of unassisted flight. Its offensive capabilities include energy blades which project from its forearms, concussion energy bullets from its hands or fingertips, releasing immensely powerful shockwaves and/or energy waves with its voice and an energy bow. It can also form energy shields around its forearms, and create impenetrable spheres of energy in its hands which are used for carrying and protection.

The RahXephon is also referred to as 翼神世音 (Yokushin Seon), literally "wing god world sound". This is essentially a translation of the name "RahXephon", and it is also the Chinese term for the series and the mecha.

While dormant, the RahXephon's face is shown covered by a pair of large wings which are attached to its forehead; these wings separate and spread when the RahXephon becomes active, and appear to be tied into its overall function. Its forehead features a golden disk, alluding to the sun god Ra and Ollin Tonatiuh. Its eyes are normally red but are occasionally golden with visible irises; it also has a pair of smaller red eyes on its visor. Below its face is an egg-shaped protected barrier which Ayato is absorbed through when entering; he is then dropped through another barrier into the pilot's seat, which resembles a pair of cupped hands emerging from a seemingly endless pool of dark water and contains two control rods.

The RahXephon is connected physically, mentally, and emotionally to its instrumentalist. Its arms and head mimic Ayato's movements. The field of view from the pilot's seat is a grid of hexagons which follows Ayato's view; the RahXephon's shields also have a hexagonal grid shape. Ayato is shown to be absorbed into the RahXephon in a variety of manners, and it moves on its own to meet Ayato several times. Ayato can also trigger awakening and entering the RahXephon through voice command. Ayato appears to feel damage inflicted on the RahXephon as physical pain. During the battle with the Dolem Forzando, the RahXephon is pierced through the shoulder with a spike of debris; Ayato is shown in the cockpit holding his shoulder in the same place shortly thereafter.

It is revealed that the RahXephon was created by Ernst von Bähbem as a tool for re-tuning the world. This re-tuning would involve the RahXephon joining with a special person who has the potential to accomplish the re-tuning, referred to as an instrumentalist. The Mu refer to the robot as "Xephon", adding the honorific of "Rah" near the end of the series when Ayato is ready to tune the world. The RahXephon's TERRA designation is the "5-A" OOPArt or "Mulian Artifact Class 5 A (MA-C5A)".

The RahXephons were designed by mecha designers Michiaki Sato and Yoshinori Sayama.

In the manga, the RahXephon is an artifact mysterious even to the Mu, used in a ritual that grants the desires of its occupants.

== Tokyo Jupiter ==
=== Maya Kamina ===
- Maya Kamina (神名 麻弥, Kamina Maya)

Voiced by: Ichiko Hashimoto (Japanese); Laura Chapman (English)

Maya Kamina is Ayato's mother and is often away from home, leaving Ayato feeling neglected and wishing to spend more time with her. Although Ayato initially believes she works in a lab, she is actually a very powerful Mulian leader. Just before Ayato leaves Tokyo Jupiter for the first time, Maya is injured by flying debris, and Ayato is severely rattled when he sees her blue blood. From then on, he is fearful and mistrusting of her. Maya reveals that she is actually Ayato's aunt, and that she adopted Ayato. She was originally sent to the human world along with her sister Quon (Ayato's biological mother). The only Mulian that was there before them was Ernst von Bähbem. Maya was raised by Shougo Rikudo while Quon slept in the care of Bähbem. Maya married Rikudo's research assistant, Shirow Watari. When Maya's Mu phase awakened, she left her husband and joined the Mu.

In other versions

In the movie, Maya is Ayato's biological mother, and her turn to the Mu is more violent: She ran away while pregnant with Ayato and killed his father.

In the manga, Maya does not turn from the "normal" humans to the Mu. She turns from a kind Mulian who shows compassion for Reika into a malevolent character who tries to kill Reika and stages a coup d'état within the Mulian government. Her agenda is the eradication of red-blooded humans, and she shows far less attachment to Ayato than in the animated versions.

=== Hiroko Asahina ===
- Hiroko Asahina (朝比奈 浩子, Asahina Hiroko)

Voiced by: Yumi Kakazu (Japanese); Cynthia Martinez (English)

Hiroko Asahina is a classmate and friend of Ayato and Mamoru Torugai. During the attack on Tokyo in episode 1, she is lightly injured, and bleeds red blood. While Ayato is in the real world, her Mu phase activates. When Ayato returns to Tokyo Jupiter, Hiroko is relieved to see him again but is distressed by the memory loss resulting from her Mu phase activating and a feeling that Mamoru's explanation for Ayato's absence is not right. Later, she is shot by agents guarding Mamoru; Ayato finds her, and she asks Ayato "It's red, right?" while she is covered in blood (now blue) from her wounds. Ayato assures her that her blood is red, but they are afraid to admit to each other its real colour. When Ayato leaves Tokyo Jupiter for the second time, she leaves with him, and the two of them live together for a short time. While she is with Ayato, she has terrifying visions of herself as a Mulian bound to a Dolem, but cannot bring herself to talk about this with Ayato. However, she keeps a diary where she can write down her feelings. Her Dolem Vibrato eventually shows up, and Ayato destroys it, killing Hiroko in the process, which deeply traumatizes Ayato. At the end of the series, when Ayato re-tunes the world, Hiroko is brought back to life along with Mamoru.

It is revealed, through flashbacks in the series as well as in the movie prologue, that Hiroko was in love with Ayato while they were in their early teens, before Tokyo Jupiter was created, and that her feelings have not subsided even though she is dating Mamoru.

In other versions

Asahina's role in the movie is identical to that in the TV series.

In the manga, she is Ayato's tsundere girlfriend; Ayato entered the relationship in part to escape Reika's advances. Here, Asahina escapes from Tokyo Jupiter with refugees and arrives in Nirai Kanai where she projects three Dolem and holds Reika hostage, forcing Ayato to kill her.

=== Mamoru Torigai ===
- Mamoru Torigai (鳥飼 守, Torigai Mamoru)

Voiced by: Hirofumi Nojima (Japanese); Vic Mignogna (English)

Mamoru Torigai is another friend and classmate of Kamina's in Tokyo Jupiter. He was seeing Hiroko Asahina before she left Tokyo Jupiter with Ayato. Deep down, he dislikes Ayato because of Asahina's feelings for him. Mamoru is a true Mulian, like Ernst von Bähbem, Maya, and Quon, and holds a high position within the Mulian society. He follows Ayato to Nirai Kanai the second time he leaves Tokyo Jupiter and lives with Ayato for a short period of time. While in Nirai Kanai, Mamoru discovers that Asahina died. He blames Ayato for her death and fights the RahXephon with his Dolem Obbligato. His Dolem is no match for the RahXephon and loses an arm in the battle. He returns with a fully repaired Dolem and battles the RahXephon again, this time after Ayato had joined with the RahXephon, and dies in the battle. He is brought back to life, along with Asahina, when Ayato re-tunes the world.

His given name, "Mamoru", also means "to protect" in Japanese. In the light of his failure to protect Asahina and his turning against Ayato, his name becomes bitterly ironic.

In other versions

In the movie, Mamoru's role is similar to that in the TV series.

In the manga, Mamoru only appears as a classmate who makes unsuccessful advances towards Asahina.

=== Masayoshi Kuki ===
- Masayoshi Kuki (九鬼 正義, Kuki Masayoshi)

Voiced by: Hōchū Ōtsuka (Japanese); Mike Vance (English)

Masayoshi Kuki appears as second in command to Maya in Tokyo Jupiter. He sometimes questions Maya's orders and also shows some disapproval of how she treats Ayato. It is revealed that Kuki was the JSDF officer that ordered Jin Kunugi to perform the nuclear strike on the Mu in the Great Mu War. Kuki attacks Nirai-Kanai with the Largo, and appears invincible to its defense systems. Kunugi, however, activates a Jupiter device, killing Kuki and enacting his revenge before dying of his injuries.

In other versions

In the movie, Kuki also acts as the second in command, but without the history and conflict with Kunugi. He does not appear in the manga.

=== Shinobu Miwa ===
- Shinobu Miwa (三輪 忍, Miwa Shinobu)

Voiced by: Yū Asakawa (Japanese); Heather Bryson Lemaster (English)

Shinobu Miwa appears to be third in command in the Tokyo Bay base control center. She is shown working with Kuki in the control center, and holding down the fort with other subordinates while Kuki and Maya are away. At the end of the series, Miwa briefly expresses doubt over the Mu agenda before finally becoming bound to the Dolem Allegretto.

In other versions

In the movie, Miwa appears briefly in the base.

In the manga, Maya is shown to have a female second in command, but this character is not named.

== TERRA ==
=== Jin Kunugi ===
- Jin Kunugi (功刀 仁, Kunugi Jin)

Voiced by: Jōji Nakata (Japanese); John Gremillion (English)

Jin Kunugi is the stern and quiet commander of TERRA's military operations. He prefers delegating tasks to his subordinates and "managing by exception". Kunugi was an officer of the Japan Self-Defense Forces, under the command of Kuki Masayoshi, who ordered him to perform a nuclear strike on the Mu. His daughter Michiru was killed in the following war, and Kunugi became estranged from his wife. It is falsely stated in the anime that his wife is his daughter. It is revealed that Kuki was acting on behalf of the Mu (or some element within the Mu government), who wanted the humans to attack, providing justification for their further plans.

Kunugi eventually stays behind after Nirai Kanai is evacuated and activates a Jupiter device there, sacrificing himself to kill Kuki and destroy Largo, the Dolem which was bound to Kuki.

In other versions

In the movie, Kunugi's conflict with Kuki is removed, substituting conflict with Bähbem. Kunugi thus takes part of the role Futagami had in the TV series.

In the manga, Kunugi also appears as the commander, but with little background and drama surrounding his character.

=== Megumi Shitou ===
- Megumi Shitou (紫東 恵, Shitō Megumi)

Voiced by: Ayako Kawasumi (Japanese); Hilary Haag (English)

Megumi Shitou is Haruka's younger sister. She initially protests Ayato living with her, Haruka, and their uncle, but she does her best to help Ayato feel at home, and develops a crush on Ayato as the series progresses. She often serves pocky and other snacks, and introduces Ayato to ramune. Although seemingly energetic and upbeat, she has many internal issues. She did not fit in well in school, so she joined TERRA as a trainee. She would later be promoted to the rank of a full officer.

She initially has a crush on Souchi Yakumo, but gives up on him when she finds out that he is seeing her friend, Kim Hotal. She feels as if she is constantly living in her sister's shadow, and this comes to a head when she learns that Ayato and Haruka had a relationship when they were younger, as by the end of the series she has developed a crush on Ayato. In the end, she openly renounces her feelings for Ayato for the sake of her sister.

In other versions

In the movie, as in the series, Megumi helps make Ayato feel at home, but does not fall in love with Ayato or Yakumo — at least not in the scenes shown.

In the manga, Megumi and Kim have minor roles as classmates, "bodyguards", and observers of Reika.

=== Kim Hotal ===
- Kim Hotal (金 湖月, Kimu Hotaru)

Voiced by: Fumiko Orikasa (Japanese); Tiffany Grant (English)

Kim Hotal is Megumi's closest friend and a TERRA operative. When Kim was a child, her parents were killed in a Dolem attack in Australia. She joined TERRA in order to take revenge on the Mulians for her parents' deaths.

Kim starts seeing Souchi Yakumo, and although she feels guilty for hurting Megumi's feelings when she learns that Megumi likes him too, she is able to work things out with Megumi. It is also strongly hinted that Kim becomes pregnant by Souchi, as she appears to be suffering from morning sickness in two scenes near the end of the series.

In other versions

In the movie, Kim is only seen in a short glimpse. In the manga she appears in a couple of scenes with Megumi.

=== Souichi Yakumo ===
- Souichi Yakumo (八雲 総一, Yakumo Sōichi)

Voiced by: Kōki Miyata (Japanese); Mark Laskowski (English)

Souichi Yakumo is second in command at TERRA, with the rank of Major. He often takes command when Kunugi is not present. Souichi is fond of Ayato and believes that regardless of whether or not Ayato is a Mulian, he is still himself and thus, should be looked at as an individual. Souichi is kind and friendly to everyone, and Megumi misinterprets this as a chance for a relationship. Soichi is oblivious to Megumi's feelings and starts seeing Kim. Despite being softspoken and friendly, Souichi is an able commanding officer.

Later on in the series, Souichi is killed at the same time as Elvy by Ayato but is brought back after the world is tuned.

In other versions

In the movie, Souichi has the same position within TERRA but is shown to be more "in the know". He does not appear in the manga.

=== Itsuki Kisaragi ===
- Itsuki Kisaragi (如月 樹, Kisaragi Itsuki)

Voiced by: Mitsuru Miyamoto (Japanese); Jay Hickman (English)

Itsuki Kisaragi is an urbane doctor with TERRA who studies music and is part of the analysis team studying the RahXephon. At first, he appears as the adoptive brother of Quon. It is revealed he is actually Quon's biological son and Ayato's brother. Like Megumi, he feels inferior to his sibling and struggles with his own worth throughout the series. He is unable to pilot the RahXephon, and once dated Haruka (who now rejects him). He was raised in the Bähbem Institute with Makoto Isshiki and Helena von Bähbem. Like Ayato and Quon, he bears the mark of a potential instrumentalist on his stomach.

In other versions

In the movie, his character is reduced to being a love-sick guardian of the sleeping Quon.

In the manga, Itsuki and Haruka are friends and colleagues, and they eventually marry. On their wedding day, it is revealed that Itsuki and Haruka are reincarnations of Ayato and Reika.

=== Sayoko Nanamori ===
- Sayoko Nanamori (七森 小夜子, Nanamori Sayoko)

Voiced by: Atsuko Tanaka (Japanese); Kelly Manison (English)

Sayoko Nanamori is Itsuki's research assistant. She is shown to hold unrequited feelings for Itsuki, and to react angrily if anyone touches on the subject. This leads to a small running gag in the series: Whenever she is particularly upset about Itsuki, the windscreen wiper on her car is shown to make an interval swipe on its own. Episode 8 revolves around Itsuki giving Nanamori a crystal pendant as a Christmas gift; the crystal (taken from the remains of the Dolem Forzando) grows into the Dolem Sforzando, absorbs Nanamori, and alters the weather on Nirai Kanai to create blizzard-like conditions matching the state of Nanamori's feelings. She is freed by Ayato in the RahXephon, and later enters into a relationship with Makoto Isshiki and supplies him with information, thus unwittingly keeping the Bähbem Foundation abreast of Quon's status. Nanamori struggles with memories of her family, but it is later revealed that she was given false memories and was programmed by Bähbem to love Itsuki. Nanamori ends up killing Itsuki by stabbing him. Distraught over Itsuki's murder and the truth of her false memories, she kills herself.

In other versions

In the movie, Nanamori appears only in a glimpse. In the manga, Nanamori is a malevolent Mu agent and facilitates Ayato's escape from TERRA.

=== Elvy Hadhiyat ===
- Elvy Hadhiyat (エルフィ・ハディヤット, Erufi Hadiyatto)

Voiced by: Yū Sugimoto (Japanese); Christine Auten (English)

Elvy Hadhiyat is an ace pilot for TERRA, and participated in the operation to extract Ayato from Tokyo Jupiter in episode 1. She is from Indonesia and is Haruka's drinking buddy. At first she pilots a high-tech jet fighter equipped with a booster that enables her to pass through the Tokyo Jupiter barrier. Later on, she pilots the Vermilion, a Dolem given to TERRA based on the RahXephon.

Her nickname is "Bunga Mawar", meaning "Rose Blossom" in Indonesian. She has a handkerchief monogrammed with her nickname and a rose emblem. In the scene where this appears she can also be seen wearing a baseball cap with a rose design on the crown. Elvy parallels Lydia Litvyak, a World War II female fighter ace nicknamed the "White Rose of Stalingrad" and the namesake of the ship in the series.

Although Elvy initially flirts with Ayato and fights to protect him from danger, she becomes very hostile once she finds out that he is a Mulian. She uses the Vermilion to follow Ayato when he returns to Tokyo Jupiter. She is later killed in battle against the Mu when Ayato unites with the RahXephon and sings a 'song' which produces a wave of destruction that destroys her aircraft, surrounding Dolems and various TERRA sea vessels. Elvy, like others who died, is returned to life when the world is re-tuned.

Elvy appears in both the movie and the manga.

=== Alpha Squadron ===
Elvy loses her entire squadron in the first episode, and a new group of pilots is taken on as replacements in episode 7; these pilots are all longtime associates of Elvy's. They are first equipped with advanced fighter planes and eventually receive a Vermilion from the Bähbem Foundation. They do not appear in the manga or movie versions.

- Jean-Patrick "Maestro" Shapplin (ジャン・パトリック・シャプラン)

Voiced by: Fumioki (Japanese); James Faulkner (English)
Shapplin is the senior pilot and taught the other three pilots. He now flies with them under the command of his student Elvy. He has a noted preference for classical music.

- Donny "Tonpu" Wong (ドニー・ウォン)

Voiced by: Dai Matsumoto (Japanese); Paul Locklear (English)
A mild-mannered pilot. He develops a romantic interest towards Elvy. He is killed by Mamoru's Dolem, Obbligato.

- Cathy "Crazy Horse" McMahon (キャシー・マクマホン)

Voiced by: Kae Araki (Japanese); Allison Keith (English)
A freckled buxom blonde who wears a cowboy hat with her working uniform. In episode 9, she competes with Elvy over which one of them will model for Ayato to sketch.

=== Makoto Isshiki ===
- Makoto Isshiki (一色 真, Isshiki Makoto)

Voiced by: Toshihiko Seki (Japanese); Illich Guardiola (English)

Makoto Isshiki, called "The White Snake" because of his albinism and personality, is sent by the Earth Federation to observe at TERRA. He has an extremely haughty and arrogant attitude, and is contemptuous and dismissive of Ayato. His cover is rather shallow, as it is easily discovered that he was sent at the request of the Bähbem Foundation.

When Isshiki was younger, he had long hair and was quite close to Itsuki. During childhood he found an experimental Dolem in the caverns below the Bähbem Institute where he was being raised. He was able to connect with the Dolem and tried to get it to find its 'mom and dad' but became heartbroken when he realized that, like him, it had no true mother or father. He is a clone sharing the DNA of Ernst von Bähbem. He has an inferiority complex which stems from being a D-ranked instrumentalist. He had abilities beyond what was expected of a D type, but he failed to recognize praise from others and let the "D" rating stop him. Because of this, he hates being called a D type, and he feels that he has to constantly prove himself. Isshiki also hates Mulians and considers them worthless, not realising that he is Mulian himself.

Isshiki has Kunugi removed from his command position, and leads Operation Downfall to destroy the Tokyo Jupiter barrier. Although the operation is successful, it results in a horrific counterattack by the Mu, causing massive losses to TERRA. It is revealed that he deliberately ignored an order from the Earth Federation not to go through with the operation; he is deposed and imprisoned. Driven to madness, he escapes his cell at the Bähbem Foundation and goes on a killing spree against his fellow clones, and is finally shot to death by Laila Costa, one of Bähbem's assistants.

A number of other D clones appear throughout the series, perhaps to confuse the viewer.

In other versions

Isshiki appears in the movie only as the head of the Strategic Division of TERRA and the leader of Operation Downfall (J-Buster). He is not shown to have any history with Helena and Itsuki.

He does not appear in the manga.

=== Shirou Watari ===
- Shirou Watari (亘理 士郎, Watari Shirō)

Voiced by: Kenji Utsumi (Japanese); Mike Kleinhenz (English)

Shirou Watari is the director of TERRA, and spends a lot of time on the road facing the press, lobbying for the organization, and coordinating with the Bähbem Foundation. Though his public persona is as stern and serious as that of his friend Jin Kunugi, he is more cheerful around the other TERRA employees; the souvenirs he buys for the employees is a running joke in the series. Watari was the assistant of Professor Rikudo, and they found Quon and Maya together. Shirou Kamina eventually married Maya, but he changed his family name to Watari after Maya had gone over to the Mu. Watari is the biological father of Ayato and Itsuki. He was initially hesitant to meet Ayato. During his first meeting he subtly alludes to their relationship, which Ayato did not pick up on.

In other versions

In the movie, Watari is still Ayato's biological father, but the pregnancy was unplanned and fully in utero. Watari escaped with Maya, but she was being turned to the Mu and appears to have killed him during the escape.

He does not appear in the manga.

=== Other TERRA employees ===
- Masaru Gomi (五味勝, Gomi Masaru)

Voiced by: Hideki Tasaka (Japanese); Jason Douglas (English)

- Youhei Yomoda (四方田洋平, Yomoda Yōhei)

Voiced by: Katsuhiro Harasawa (Japanese); Randy Sparks (English)

Masaru Gomi and Youhei Yomoda work with Haruka, Megumi and Kim in TERRA's operations room. Little is known about them except that they are devoted fans and defenders of Quon.

The staff is larger than those four, and other operators are shown speaking, but none are named or even appear in more than one episode.

In other versions

Gomi appears briefly in the movie, while Yomoda is cut. Neither appears in the manga.

== Others ==
=== Professor Shougo Rikudo ===
- Shougo Rikudou (六道 翔吾, Rikudō Shōgo)

Voiced by: Chikao Ohtsuka (Japanese); John Swasey (English)

Shougo Rikudo is a retired archaeologist living in Nirai-Kanai. He is the uncle of Haruka and Megumi, and welcomes Ayato into his household. Soft-spoken and wise, he helps to ground the other characters. He is an expert at shogi and at Japanese calligraphy. It is revealed that it was Professor Rikudo and his assistant Shirow Watari who found Maya and Quon at the shrine, and that Maya was raised as Rikudo's adoptive daughter, making him Ayato's grandfather.

In other versions

Rikudo has an equally prominent position in the movie as in the series, and he takes on a greater importance in telling the story. In the movie, he is the one to encourage Haruka to join Ayato.

He does not appear in the manga.

=== Johji Futagami ===
- Johji Futagami (弐神 譲二, Futagami Jõji)

Voiced by: Katsunosuke Hori (Japanese); Andy McAvin (English)

Johji Futagami is a Columbo-like reporter from Amato News who is given exclusive press access to TERRA, making his way around the island of Nirai Kanai asking questions of both principal characters and other local residents. Throughout the series, he is able to supply new information to Haruka, while being involved in investigative journalism. He eventually goes on his own hunt for Ayato and Asahina after their escape from Tokyo Jupiter. It is revealed that his real name is Takeshi Jumonji, and that he is a high ranking intelligence officer with the Earth Federation. In the endgame, he relays orders to the combined TERRA/Federation fleet and tracks down and kills Ernst von Bähbem.

Futagami does not appear in the movie or the manga.

=== Ernst von Bähbem ===
- Ernst von Bähbem (エルンスト・フォン・バーベム)

Voiced by: Iemasa Kayumi (Japanese); Ted Pfister (English)

Ernst von Bähbem, also called "The Designer", is the cloned host body of an ancient Mulian. His practice of cloning himself has some characters mistakenly calling him a modern Methuselah. Bähbem was responsible for the continent of Mu disappearing into another dimension, and he seeks to rectify the situation by having the world "re-tuned" before the dimensions destroy each other and turn into "mud". Bähbem seems not to care about whether the humans or the Mu are the ones that will succeed in the tuning, or indeed care about the people that he uses to attain his goals. He is later shot and killed by Johji Futagami.

In other versions

In the movie, Bähbem has the stated goal of seeing the Mu prevail in the tuning; his role is otherwise similar to that in the series.

Neither Bähbem nor his foundation appear in the manga.

=== Helena von Bähbem ===
- Helena von Bähbem (ヘレナ・フォン・バーベム)

Voiced by: Mako Hyōdō (Japanese); Kelli Cousins (English)

Helena von Bähbem is the niece of Ernst von Bähbem. A childhood acquaintance of Makoto Isshiki and Itsuki Kisaragi, she serves as the second in command in the Bähbem Foundation. In addition to being a childhood dabbler in witchcraft, she was a potential instrumentalist, but passed the ideal age without realising her potential. This makes her jealous of Quon and others that might succeed in tuning the world. She eventually allows Ernst von Bähbem to take over her body.

In other versions

Helena appears briefly with Ernst in the movie.

She does not appear in the manga.

=== Minor recurring characters ===
Tokyo public security agents
Agents under the command of Maya, who try to capture Ayato and Haruka. Group codenames include Macondo and Yoknapatawpha. First appearance: Episode 1. The agents also appear in the movie and manga.
Captain of the Lilia Litvyak
The captain of the Lilia Litvyak appears in episodes 1 and 4, and again in episode 22.
Mariko Kunugi
Jin Kunugi's separated wife. Appears in episodes 10 and 23.
Michiru Kunugi
Daughter of Jin and Mariko Kunugi. Killed during the great Mu war, but affects the story through a taped message and musical compositions.
Laila Costa
One of Bähbem's bodyguards and assassins. She first appears in the show as a local islander in episode 12, giving a photojournalist a lift to a volcanic crater in the Philippines. She kills the photojournalist at the behest of the Foundation to protect their secrets. Her next appearance is with Bähbem in the final episodes of the show, where she shoots Makoto Isshiki when he threatens Bähbem's life. However, she makes the mistake of calling Isshiki a 'D' and he manages to shoot her in the head, killing her, before collapsing from his fatal wounds.

She does not appear in the movie or manga.
