= Ichiko Hashimoto (musician) =

Japanese jazz pianist, composer and singer

- Born: 1 July 1952
- Origin: Kobe, Japan
- Genres: Jazz, Fusion
- Occupations: pianist, composer, singer
- Years active: 1980–present

Ichiko Hashimoto (橋本 一子, Hashimoto Ichiko; born July 1, 1952 in Kobe, Japan) is a jazz pianist, composer and singer. She has also acted in television and film.

Hashimoto was born in Kobe, grew up in Tokyo and started playing the piano at the age of five. She attended Musashino Academia Musicae, where she graduated in 1975.

Ichiko sometimes performs with her sister Mayumi Hashimoto (橋本 まゆみ, Hashimoto Mayumi).

== Discography ==
=== Albums ===
- Colored Music (1981)**
- Ichiko (1984)
- Beauty (1985)*
- VIVANT (1986)*
- MOOD MUSIC (1987)*
- High Excentrique (1988)*
- High Excentrique Piano Music (1988)*
- D.M. (1989)*
- Je m'aime (1990)*
- Romantic Rain (ロマンティックな雨) (1992)
- Under Water (～水の中のボッサ・ノーヴァ) (1994)
- Water forest (水の中の森) (1997)
- najanaja (1998)
- Idiocy (白痴, Hakuchi) original soundtrack (1999)
- Miles Away (Tokuma Japan, 1999) – tribute to Miles Davis
- Phantasmagoria (Tokuma Japan, 2000)
- Miles Blend (Tokuma Japan, 2001) – tribute to Miles Davis
- RahXephon O.S.T. 1 (2002)
- RahXephon O.S.T. 2 (2002)
- RahXephon O.S.T. 3 (2002)
- Turned Perspective 1994–2001 (2002)
- RahXephon Pluralitas Concentio O.S.T. (2003)
- Ub-X (2006)
- Vega (2007)
- Arc'd-X (2009)
- Code Geass: Akito the Exiled O.S.T. (2012)
- Code Geass: Akito the Exiled O.S.T. 2 (2016)
- duo (2016)
- view (2021)

* remastered and reissued in Japan (2007)
** remastered and first issued on CD in Japan (2008)

=== Singles ===
- "Hold On I'm Comin'" (1988): Single track from High Exentrique.
- "Far thinking" ("はるかな想い", "Haruka na omoi") (1992): Single track from Romantic Rain (ロマンティックな雨). Used in a Nissan Bluebird commercial.
- "Softly..." ("そっと…", "Sotto") (1993) Single. Used in a commercial for The Tokyo Electric Power Company.
- "Heartful Dream" (2003): Maxi single. Used in a commercial for Aiful.

=== Collaborations ===
- Yellow Magic Orchestra: YMO domestic tour "Yellow Magic Orchestra Technopolis 2000-20" (March 21-April 15, 1980).
- "フレバリー･ミュージック" (1987)
- Loom (1990): Album for the PC Engine game.
- RahXephon sound drama (2002): Ending theme

=== Movie soundtracks ===
- Akuemon (1993) Director: Makoto Tezuka
- The train ran to the plateau (高原に列車が走った, Kougen ni ressha ga hashitta) (1984) directed by Takaharu Saeki. The music were performed by Colored Music.
- NUMANITE (1995) and NARAKUE (1997) short film compilations by Makoto Tezuka
- Idiocy (白痴, Hakuchi) (1999) Director: Makoto Tezuka
- Experimental movie (実験映画, Jikken eiga) (1999) Director: Makoto Tezuka
- CLOVER (1999) Short Anime Clip, Director: Kitarou Kousaka
- RahXephon Pluralitas Concentio O.S.T. (2003) Director: Tomoki Kyoda Supervising director: Yutaka Izubuchi

== Filmography and TV appearances ==
- MNEMOSYNE (1991)
- Whisper of the ammonite was heard (アンモナイトのささやきを聞いた, Anmonaito no sasayaki o kī ta) (1992)
- RahXephon (2002) as Maya Kamina
- RahXephon: Pluralitas Concentio (2003) as Maya Kamina

== See also ==
- An Music School
