= Yutaka Izubuchi =

Japanese anime designer and director (born 1958)

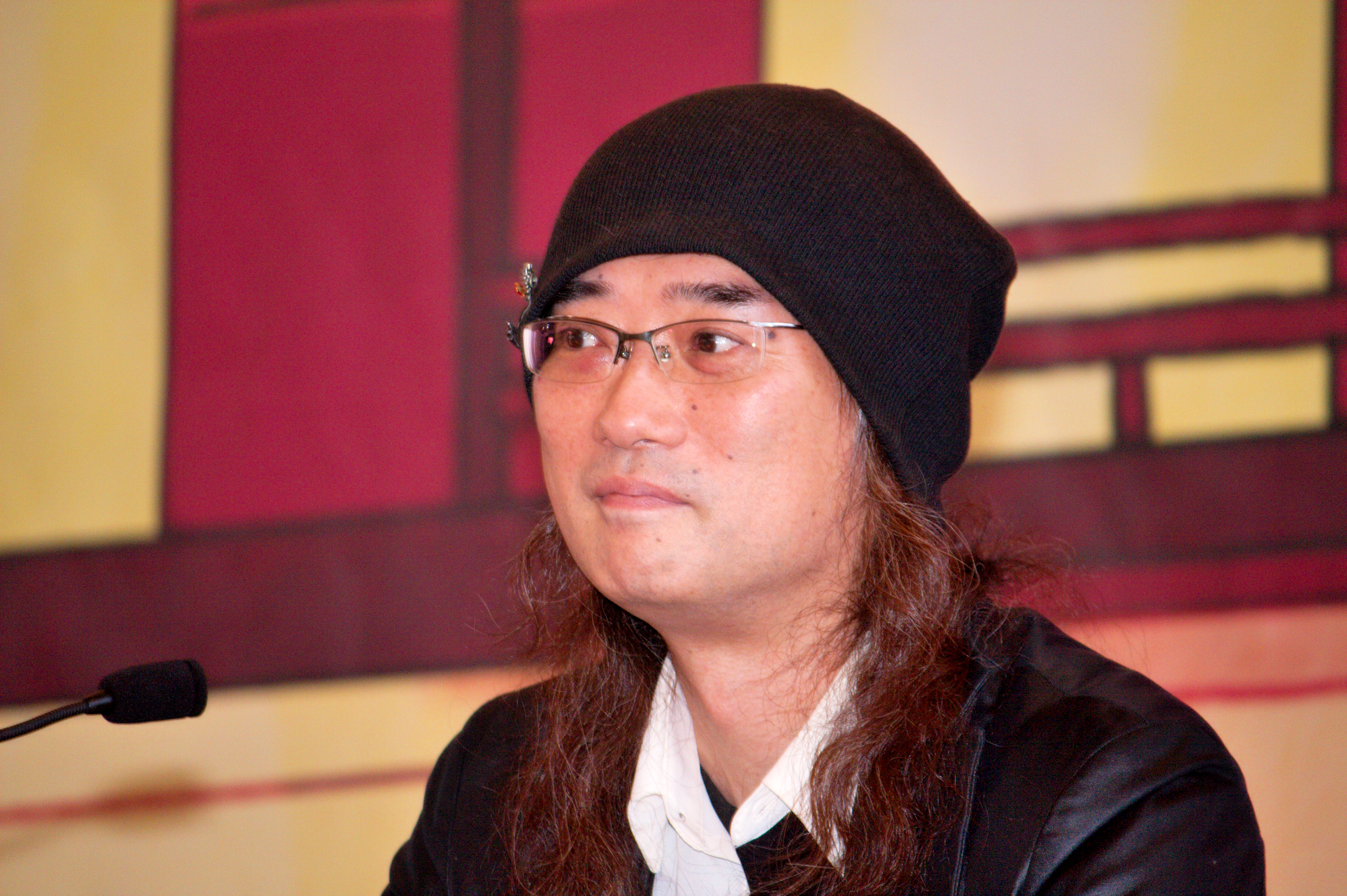
- Yutaka Izubuchi at Japan Expo 2008
- Born: December 8, 1958 (age 67); Tokyo, Japan
- Occupations: Mecha designer, Character designer, Anime director, Manga artist, Illustrator, Screenwriter
- Known for: RahXephon, Patlabor

Yutaka Izubuchi (出渕 裕, Izubuchi Yutaka; born December 8, 1958) is a Japanese anime mecha and character designer, anime director, illustrator and manga artist. He was born in Tokyo, Japan and grew up in Yokohama.

Izubuchi is also known for his manga and illustrations, but most of his fame comes from his design work. He mainly designs robots and other mecha in anime works, while he designs characters and creatures in Tokusatsu productions. He is also interested in dress design, especially German military uniforms, and by extension European armor. This influence is also evident in the design of mecha and the costumes of the characters. The design of robots such as Gundam and Galient incorporates the image of armour, and the character costume designs he is entrusted with are mainly military uniforms and other uniforms. He also created the Protect-Gear armor used in the Kerberos saga (Jin-Roh, etc.), based on German military helmets.

He is not only a designer, but also a scriptwriter, director and producer of numerous video works. In addition, he has several original works which he owns the copyright to. For the Patlabor series, he was heavily involved in its production as one of the members of the copyright holder group Headgear. (Note: The other members are manga artist Masami Yuki, screenwriter Kazunori Itō, character designer Akemi Takada and animation director Mamoru Oshii.)

== Biography ==
When Izubuchi was in nursery school, the Japanese TV anime series Astro Boy began airing. During his primary and junior high school years, Tokusatsu TV series such as Ultra Series and Kamen Rider began to be broadcast and became very popular. Tokusatsu films such as Godzilla and foreign television series such as Thunderbirds and Star Trek were also broadcast, and he was fascinated by these Tokusatsu programs. He was particularly fond of UFO in foreign series. After that, all Tokusatsu programs focused on family and children's entertainment, which made Izubuchi no longer enjoyable. Later, as if to replace them, anime series with complex stories that appealed to adults began to be produced, and his interest shifted to that. Gradually, anime directors such as Isao Takahata, Yoshiyuki Tomino, and Osamu Dezaki and their works began to attract public attention, and Izubuchi was particularly fond of Tomino and his directorial work Triton of the Sea and Reideen The Brave. (Note: He really likes Reideen and the Rahxephon project started with the idea of creating his own Reideen.) He also became interested in Sci-Fi and fantasy as a high school student. He then became a big fan of Space Battleship Yamato, aired in 1974.

In 1978, Izubuchi made his debut as a guest robot designer for Tōshō Daimos. It all started when he went on a tour of Sunrise, which had produced many robot animations, and was invited by Tadao Nagahama, the director of those works, to design enemy robots. Since then, he has been involved in mecha designs for the Gundam series, the Patlabor series and other anime productions. As of 2006, Izubuchi said that the design work he was most proud of was on WXIII: Patlabor the Movie 3.

Not just limited to anime, he also branched out into Tokusatsu shows in Toei's Super Sentai Series, designing characters and costumes for creatures and villains. The design of the Predator in the Hollywood film Predator was adapted from the design of the villainous Adjutant Booba in Dengeki Sentai Changeman, which was designed by Izubuchi. The designer directly told Izubuchi that he had imitated his design.

On the other hand, Izubuchi also began working as a manga artist with the serialisation of Rune Masquer, and as an illustrator by drawing illustrations for novels in the 1980s. He is particularly well known for his character designs for the fantasy-themed series Record of Lodoss War. He created the standard for Western-style fantasy visual imagery in Japan by taking images popular worldwide and drawing them in a sophisticated manner.

Izubuchi made his debut as an animation director in 2002 with RahXephon, for which he wrote the original story. Izubuchi did some additional design work for Tomoki Kyoda's Eureka Seven, while Kyoda was an assistant director and episode director on RahXephon and directed its theatrical adaptation.

He became the general director of Star Blazers: Space Battleship Yamato 2199 in 2012, a reboot of Space Battleship Yamato, of which he had been a big fan for many years.

Izubuchi was credited with creation of the 2024 anime Metallic Rouge. He and president Masahiko Minami created a new fictional world and historical background in order to make it Bones' own IP (intellectual property) work.

== Main Works ==
=== TV series ===
- Tōshō Daimos (1978-1979) (Guest mecha design (Note: As he joined the series midway through, his name did not appear in the end credits.))
- Future Robot Daltanious (1979-1980) (Guest Mecha design)
- Space Emperor God Sigma (1980–1981) (Guest Mecha design)
- Invincible Robo Trider G7 (1980–1981) (Guest mecha design)
- Space Battleship Yamato III (1980-1981) (Cooperation in SF setting)
- Saikyō Robo Daiōja (1981-1982) (Guest mecha design)
- Combat Mecha Xabungle (1982-1983) (Sub-mecha design)
- Aura Battler Dunbine (1983-1984) (Sub-mecha design)
- Panzer World Galient (1984) (Sub-mecha design)
- Mobile Suit Gundam ZZ (1986) (Sub-mech design)
- Patlabor: The TV Series (1989–1990) (Mecha design, Scripts, Copyright holder (Note: As a member of Headgear.))
- Tekkaman Blade (1992–1993) (Cooperation in setting)
- Mobile Suit Gundam Wing (1996) (Costume design)
- Gasaraki (1998) (Mecha design, Costume design)
- Infinite Ryvius (1999-2000) (Costume design (Note: The final draft is completely different from Izubuchi's rough draft.))
- RahXephon (2002) (Original story, Director, Scripts, Storyboards)
- Eureka Seven (2005) (Design Works)
- Ergo Proxy (2006) (Cooperation on design)
- Glass Fleet (2006) (Concept advisor)
- Gigantic Formula (2007) (Mecha design)
- Toward the Terra (2007) (Concept design)
- Skull Man (2007) (Refined character design, Head writer, Scripts)
- Birdy the Mighty: Decode (2008) (Creative producer)
- Birdy the Mighty: Decode 02 (2009) (Creative producer)
- Shangri-La (2009) (Episode 11 script)
- Metallic Rouge (2024) (Original story, Supervisor, Head writer)

=== Anime films ===
- Final Yamato (1983) (Sub-mecha design)
- Macross: Do You Remember Love? (1984) (Cooperation on mecha design)
- Mobile Suit Gundam: Char's Counterattack (1988) (Mecha design (Note: He was a substitute for Mamoru Nagano, but this was his first time designing a main robot.))
- Patlabor: The Movie (1989) (Mecha design, Copyright holder)
- Silent Möbius (1991) (Mecha design)
- Patlabor 2: The Movie (1993) (Mecha design, Copyright holder)
- Jin-Roh: The Wolf Brigade (Kerberos saga) (2000) (Mecha design)
- WXIII: Patlabor the Movie 3 (2002) (Mecha design, Supervisor, Copyright holder)
- RahXephon: Pluralitas Concentio (2003) (Original story, General director, Scripts)
- Evangelion: 1.0 You Are (Not) Alone (2007) (Design Works)
- Evangelion: 3.0 You Can (Not) Redo (2012) (Design Works)
- Star Blazers: Space Battleship Yamato 2199 (2012) (General director, Head writer, Mecha design)
- Star Blazers: Odyssey of the Celestial Ark (2014) (General director, Head writer, Mecha design)

=== Original video animation ===
- Delpower X Bakuhatsu Miracle Genki! (1986) (Mecha Design)
- Panzer World Galient: Crest of Iron (1986) (Mecha design (Note: He arranged the designs of the TV series, including the main robot.))
- New Story of Aura Battler Dunbine (1988) (Mecha design)
- Mobile Suit Gundam 0080: War in the Pocket (1989) (Design Works (Note: Mecha design and prop design.))
- Mobile Police Patlabor: The Early Days (1988–1989) (Mecha design, Copyright holder)
- Assemble Insert (1989-1990) (Mecha design)
- Patlabor: The New Files (1990–1992) (Mecha design, Scripts, Storyboards, Copyright holder)
- Record of Lodoss War (1990) (Character draft)
- Birdy the Mighty (1996) (Creature design, Supervisor)
- Patlabor EZY (2026) (General Director, Copyright holder)

=== Web animation ===
- Japan Animator Expo 33 "Ragnarok" Hello from the Countries of the World (2015) (Robot design)
- Japan Animator Expo extra "Mobile Police Patlabor Reboot" (2016) (Mecha design, Supervisor, Copyright holder)

=== Live-action films ===
- The Red Spectacles (Kerberos saga) (1987) (Protect Gear design)
- Cutie Honey (2004) (Character design)
- Lorelei: The Witch of the Pacific Ocean (2005) (Costume design (Note: Paula's watertight suit design.))
- Kamen Rider: The First (2005) (Refined character design)
- Kamen Rider The Next (2007) (Refined character design)
- Shin Godzilla (2016) (Design Works)
- Shin Kamen Rider (2023) (Character design)

=== Tokusatsu ===
- Kagaku Sentai Dynaman (1983) (Character design)
- Choudenshi Bioman (1984) (Character design)
- Dengeki Sentai Changeman (1985) (Character design)
- Choushinsei Flashman (1986) (Character design)
- Kamen Rider Agito (2001) (Character design)
- Cutie Honey: The Live (2007) (Character design)
- Kamen Rider Decade (2009) (Character design)
- Kamen Rider OOO (2010) (Character design)
- Tokumei Sentai Go-Busters (2012) (Character design)
- Kamen Rider Zi-O (2018) (Character design)

=== Video games ===
- Velldeselba Senki (1997) (Character design)
- Panzer Front bis (2011) (Supervisor)
- Soulcalibur IV (2008) (Character design (Note: He designed one of the bonus characters, Scheherazade.))

=== Manga ===
- Rune Masquer (1988-?, 2009-?) (Manga writing)
- 8 Man (1994) (Refined character design)
- Junk: Record of the Last Hero (2004-2007) (Costume design)

=== Novels ===
- Record of Lodoss War (1988-1995) (Illustrations)

== Notes and references ==
=== Sources ===
- Izubuchi, Yutaka (September 1, 2000). Izubuchi Yutaka Mechanical Design Works I. Movic. ISBN 4-8960-1490-1.
