= Hiroshi Ōnogi =

Japanese anime screenwriter and novelist (born 1959)

Hiroshi Ōnogi (大野木 寛, Ōnogi Hiroshi; born 1959) is a Japanese screenwriter and novelist focusing on anime productions.

Ōnogi attended Keio University in the same years as Macross character designer Haruhiko Mikimoto and creator Shōji Kawamori, both of whom he would first collaborate with in The Super Dimension Fortress Macross.

== Filmography ==
- The Super Dimension Fortress Macross (1982), Scenario
- The Super Dimension Century Orguss (1983), Script
- Heavy Metal L-Gaim (1984), Script
- Mobile Suit Zeta Gundam (1985), Script
- Hey! Bunbuu (1985), Script
- AD Police (1999), Script (ep 2, 5), Sci-Fi Adviser
- Earth Girl Arjuna (2001), Series Composition, Script
- The Daichis - Earth Defence Family (2001), Script (ep 0, 8, 11)
- The Siamese - First Mission (2001), Scenario
- Magical Witchland (2001), 2D Script Writer
- RahXephon (2002), Screenplay (ep 14, 21–22, 26)
- Heat Guy J (2002), Screenplay (ep 2, 6, 8, 11, 12)
- Mobile Suit Gundam Seed (2002), Scenario
- Macross Zero (2002), Script
- RahXephon: Pluralitas Concentio (2003), Screenplay
- Submarine 707R (2003), Script
- Area 88 (2004), Script
- Mobile Suit Gundam MS IGLOO: The Hidden One Year War (2004), Script
- Mobile Suit Gundam Seed Destiny (2004), Script
- Doraemon (2005–present), Script
- Aquarion (2005), Series Composition, Screenplay (5, 7, 9, 12, 13, 15, 19, 22, 23, 25, 26)
- Eureka Seven (2005), Script (ep 8, 11, 17, 21, 25, 31, 37, 40, 43, 46)
- Noein - to your other self (2005), Series Composition, Script (ep 5, 11, 15, 19, 23, 24)
- Mobile Suit Gundam MS IGLOO: Apocalypse 0079 (2006), Screenplay
- Kekkaishi (2006), Series Composition
- Toward the Terra (2007), Script (ep 11, 13, 23, 24)
- The Skull Man (2007), Script (ep 3, 4, 8, 11)
- Aquarion: Wings of Betrayal (2007), Series Composition
- Aquarion (2007), Screenplay
- Mnemosyne - Mnemosyne no Musume-tachi (2008), Screenplay
- Birdy the Mighty Decode (2008), Series Composition
- Xam'd: Lost Memories (2008), Script (ep 22, 23)
- Hokuto no Ken Raoh Gaiden: Ten no Haoh (2008), Screenplay
- Shugo Chara!! Doki— (2008), Series Composition
- Birdy the Mighty Decode:02 (2009), Series Composition
- Fullmetal Alchemist: Brotherhood (2009), Series Composition
- Shangri-La (2009), Series Composition
- Seisen Cerberus: Ryūkoku no Fatalite (2016), Series Composition
- GeGeGe no Kitarō (2018), Series Composition
- Phantasy Star Online 2: Episode Oracle (2019), Series Composition
- How a Realist Hero Rebuilt the Kingdom (2021), Script
- D_Cide Traumerei the Animation (2021), Script
- Akuma-kun (2023), Series Composition
- Blue Archive: The Animation (2024), Series Composition
- Backstabbed in a Backwater Dungeon (2025), Series Composition

== Bibliography ==
Ōnogi has adapted several television shows into novels. A few of these are listed below.

- Royal Space Force: The Wings of Honneamise
- Genesis of Aquarion
- RahXephon
