= Tomoki Kyoda =

Japanese anime director

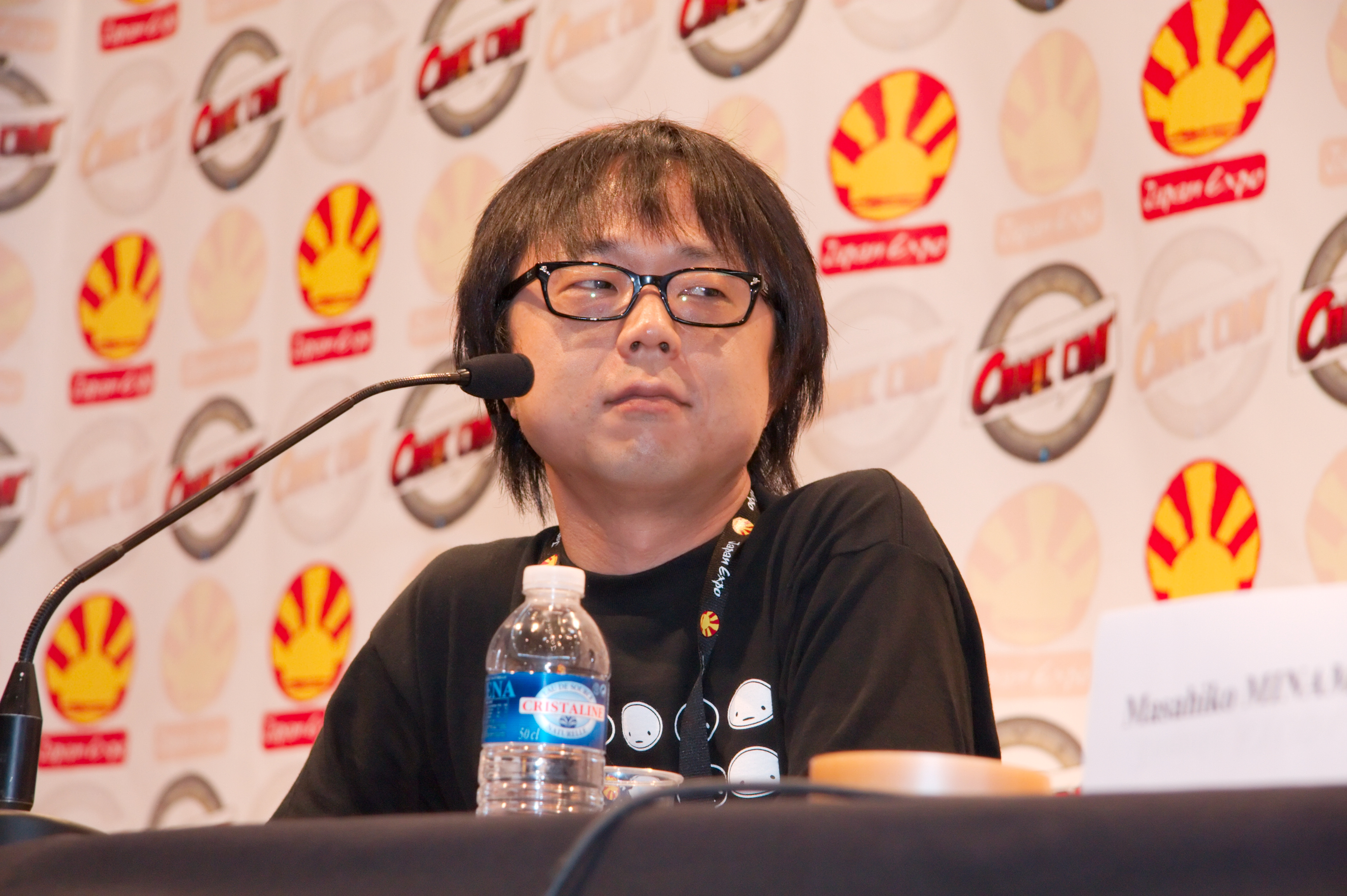
Tomoki Kyoda at Japan Expo 2009

Tomoki Kyoda (京田 知己, Kyōda Tomoki) (born 1970) is a Japanese animation director and animator born in Osaka, Japan. Formerly a graphic designer, he nurtured the dream of becoming an animator from childhood.

After doing various works supervising drawing continuity, he joined the Bones anime RahXephon as assistant director and later directed RahXephon: Pluralitas Concentio, his first film. He then went on to become head director of Eureka Seven, also under studio Bones. He collaborated with Gainax and Studio Khara in producing the new tetralogy of Neon Genesis Evangelion films as a storyboard artist on the first film, Evangelion: 1.0 You Are (Not) Alone. He revived the Eureka Seven franchise with the announcement of a brand new theatrical feature. He is a member of the 15-person steering committee of the Japan Animation Creators Association (JAniCA) labor group.

== Noted works ==
- Gensomaden Saiyuki (2000) - Storyboards, episode director
- The Daichis - Earth's Defense Family (Chikyōbōei kazoku) (2001) - Mecha and creature design, staging, storyboards
- RahXephon (2002) - Assistant director, episode director, staging, storyboards
- RahXephon: Pluralitas Concentio (2003) - Director, composition, scenario, storyboard
- Fullmetal Alchemist (2003) - Storyboards
- Kenran Butohsai: The Mars Daybreak (2004) - direction, storyboards
- Eureka Seven (2005) - Chief director, storyboards, unit direction
- Ouran High School Host Club (2006) - Storyboards, episode director
- Ayakashi Ayashi (2006) - Opening director, storyboard
- Evangelion: 1.0 You Are (Not) Alone (2007) - Storyboard
- Moribito: Guardian of the Spirit (2007) - Opening director, storyboard
- Darker than Black (2007) - Storyboards
- Eureka Seven: Good Night, Sleep Tight, Young Lovers (2009) - Chief director, composition, scenario
