= List of Ghost in the Shell: Stand Alone Complex episodes =

The collection box released in North America by Bandai Entertainment and Manga Entertainment

Ghost in the Shell: Stand Alone Complex (攻殻機動隊 STAND ALONE COMPLEX, Kōkaku Kidōtai: Sutando Arōn Konpurekkusu; "Mobile Armoured Riot Police: Stand Alone Complex") is a Japanese anime television series based on Masamune Shirow's Ghost in the Shell manga. The anime series was directed by Kenji Kamiyama, animated by Production I.G, and produced by Bandai Visual, Bandai Entertainment, Dentsu, Nippon Television Network, Tokuma Shoten, Victor Entertainment, and Manga Entertainment. Stand Alone Complex was first licensed and broadcast in 2002 by anime television network Animax across most of Asia. It was subsequently licensed in the United States and Canada by Bandai Entertainment and Manga Entertainment, in the United Kingdom by Manga Entertainment, and in Australia by Madman Entertainment. It continues to be broadcast in the United States as of May 2012 on Adult Swim, and was broadcast in Canada and the United Kingdom by YTV and AnimeCentral, respectively.

In the original pay-per-view broadcasts, the opening theme for each episode is "Inner universe" (lyrics: Origa, Shanti Snyder; music: Yoko Kanno; vocals: Origa) and the ending theme for each episode is "Lithium flower" (lyrics: Tim Jensen; music: Yoko Kanno; vocals: Scott Matthew). For the subsequent terrestrial television broadcasts, the opening theme for each episode is "GET9" (lyrics: Tim Jensen; music: Yoko Kanno, vocals: jillmax) and the ending theme is "I do" (lyrics & vocals: Ilaria Graziano; music Yoko Kanno). The original soundtrack, containing the original opening and closing themes in addition to other tracks from the series, was released by Victor Entertainment on January 22, 2002, in Japan, and by Bandai Visual on November 7, 2004, in the United States.

Thirteen DVD compilations, each containing two episodes, were released by Bandai Visual between December 21, 2002, and December 21, 2003. The English adaptation of the anime was released in seven DVD compilations, each containing four episodes, by Manga Entertainment and Bandai Entertainment between July 27, 2004, and July 26, 2005. Complete DVD collection boxes were released by Bandai Visual as a Limited Edition on July 27, 2007, in Japan, and by Manga Entertainment on October 31, 2006, in the United States.

Stand Alone Complex contains 14 "Stand Alone" (SA) episodes and 12 "Complex" (C) episodes. Stand Alone episodes take place independently of the main plot and focus on Public Security Section 9's investigation of isolated cases. Complex episodes advance the main plot, which follows Section 9's investigation of the Laughing Man incident: the kidnapping and subsequent release of a Japanese CEO by a sophisticated hacker.

A second season titled Ghost in the Shell: S.A.C. 2nd GIG was aired from January 1, 2004, to January 8, 2005. Unlike the first season, the second season has three designations denoting the type of episode: individual (IN), dividual (DI) and dual (DU). IN episodes tie in with the Individual Eleven storyline; DI episodes are stand-alone episodes that may still be tied into other storylines; and DU episodes tie in with the Cabinet Intelligence Service & Goda story-line (though the two main storylines inter-relate). There are 11 individual, 11 dividual and 4 dual episodes. In the United States the TV Parental Guidelines system rated the episodes from TV-14 to TV-MA.

== Series overview ==
Season	Episodes	Originally released	
Season	Episodes	First released	Last released
1	26	October 1, 2002	October 1, 2003
2	26	January 1, 2004	January 8, 2005

== Episodes ==
=== Season 1: Stand Alone Complex (2002–03) ===
No. overall	No. in season	Title	Directed by	Written by	Original release date	English air date
1	1	"SA: Public Security Section 9 – SECTION-9"; Transliteration: "Kōan Kyūka – Sekushon-9" (Japanese: 公安9課 SECTION-9)	Toshiyuki Kawano	Kenji Kamiyama	October 1, 2002	November 7, 2004
Section 9 is called in to resolve a hostage crisis at a geisha house staffed by android geisha. After the crisis is taken care of, Aramaki is approached by Kubota, who reveals that the Japanese Foreign Minister was being actively investigated by military intelligence after expressing interest in the Ichinose Report, a document detailing diplomatic and military actions to be taken in the event of a national crisis. Given the sensitive nature of the case, Kubota asks that Section 9 take over the investigation where the original team left off. While reviewing the details of the hostage crisis at the geisha house, Togusa figures out that the Foreign Minister had his cyberbrain switched with that of an unknown intelligence agent working for the American Empire. Section 9 then successfully prevents the American intelligence agent, who is using the Foreign Minister's body, from leaving the country with the sensitive report in his possession.
2	2	"SA: Runaway Evidence – TESTATION"; Transliteration: "Bōsō no Shōmei – Tesutēshon" (Japanese: 暴走の証明 TESTATION)	Toshiyuki Kawano	Junichi Fujisaku	October 1, 2002	November 14, 2004
A heavy-assault multi-ped tank runs amok, under the control of an unknown hijacker using the "recognition code" of the tank's designer, Takeshi Kago, who died a week earlier. After going on a destructive spree at the testing facility, the tank heads towards the urban area of Niihama. Section 9 is called in to stop the tank, as no terrorist group has claimed responsibility, and the JSDF refuses to involve itself unless terrorism is the clear motive. Saito attempts to snipe the tank, but is thwarted due to the tank's capability to link into the same satellite Saito is using to aim. Meanwhile, Togusa and Ishikawa interview the tank's co-designer, Toshio Ooba. After some questioning by Togusa, Ooba reveals the identity of the tank's hijacker: Takeshi Kago, the original designer. After Kago's death, Ooba linked Kago's brain to the tank's AI, effectively putting Kago in complete control of the tank. Ooba further reveals that Kago's possible motive may be to avenge himself upon his parents; he had serious medical problems, but his parents refused to allow him to get a cyberbody or even a cyberbrain due to their religious beliefs. Kago's destination is his parents home, and Section 9 tries to stop him before he gets there. They are unsuccessful, and Section 9 is forced to battle Kago; in the end, they disable the tank and Kusanagi short-circuits Kago's brain. However, the Major discovers a split second before she does so that all Kago was trying to do was show his parents his new steel body.
3	3	"SA: A Modest Rebellion – ANDROID AND I"; Transliteration: "Sasayaka na Hanran – Andoroido Ando Ai" (Japanese: ささやかな反乱 ANDROID AND I)	Masayuki Yoshihara	Yoshiki Sakurai	November 1, 2002	November 21, 2004
A series of android suicides prompts Section 9 to investigate the manufacturer, Genesis Androids. While Aramaki questions the plant manager, Kusanagi and a Tachikoma covertly hack into the plant's database to try to uncover any possible wrongdoings by the manufacturer. As it turns out, all the androids were of the same model, an obsolete product known as the GA07-JL android, dubbed the Jeri by its small but loyal fanbase. The Genesis Jeri-model android was popular because of the ease with which an end-user could modify it to their own specifications. While the plant manager half-jokingly comments that the Jeris have grown despondent because of their obsolete status, Kusanagi discovers that a virus has been inserted into the mainframe, probably by an end-user who had sent his Jeri back to Genesis for refurbishing, which infected other Jeris sent in for maintenance and compelled them to destroy themselves. Section 9 eventually discover that the culprit is Marshall McLachlan, the son of the Canadian ambassador to Japan. After the embassy revokes McLachlan's diplomatic immunity, the team confront and arrest him, and learn that he had fallen so much in love with his Jeri that he considered her an actual person instead of an android, and wanted to eliminate the other Jeris so that she would be unique. Note: The episode includes an extended homage to the French New Wave film Breathless.
4	4	"C: The Visual Device will Laugh – INTERCEPTER"; Transliteration: "Shikaku Soshi wa Warau – Intāseputā" (Japanese: 視覚素子は笑う INTERCEPTER)	Hideyo Yamamoto	Shōtarō Suga	November 1, 2002	November 28, 2004
Yamaguchi, an old friend of Togusa's and a police detective working in the Laughing Man task force, is murdered after he calls Togusa, requesting to see him concerning what Yamaguchi terms "suspicious internal activity" by superiors in the police department. At Yamaguchi's wake, Togusa is approached by Yamaguchi's wife, who delivers an envelope from him to Togusa that contain a series of strange photographs. Upon scrutinizing the photographs, Togusa realizes that none of them are taken using a camera. Continuing his investigation, Togusa interviews another detective in the Laughing Man task force, who coincidentally mentions that the task force is waiting to bug a primary suspect in the case with cybernetic surveillance devices called "interceptors". The interceptors allow constant audio and visual monitoring of the subject via their own senses. Togusa concludes that the Laughing Man task force members were bugged with these devices illegally for monitoring. Shortly thereafter, the information about the illegal use of the interceptors is leaked by Section 9, prompting the police Commissioner to call a press conference regarding the growing scandal. The Commissioner publicly denies any responsibility, instead blaming the head of the "Laughing Man" task force, Kunihiko Nibu, and announcing Nibu's immediate resignation. News reporters press the Commissioner about the possible involvement of higher officials, as well as the Commissioner's own ties to nanomachine maker Serano Genomics, Inc., who manufactured the interceptors, but the Commissioner continues in his denials. At that point, the hacker known as the Laughing Man returns. Hijacking a police official's cyberbrain, the Laughing Man denounces what he refers to as the "previous farce", and announces that due to the police's efforts to cover up the truth, he will reluctantly challenge them again. Finally, he delivers a death threat to the commissioner, stating that he will "remove" him if the truth is not revealed in full. Note: This episode has a small tribute to the movie Blade Runner.
5	5	"C: The Inviting Bird will Chant – DECOY"; Transliteration: "Manekidori wa Utau – Dekoi" (Japanese: マネキドリは謡う DECOY)	Ryūtarō Nakamura	Junichi Fujisaku	December 1, 2002	December 5, 2004
Section 9 suspects that the police investigators handling the Laughing Man case are using their primary suspect, a former Serano Genomics programmer with a shady anti-corporate past named Ei Nanao, as a decoy to hide some form of higher-level corruption. Aramaki orders Section 9 to commence around the clock surveillance on Nanao in an attempt to catch him in the act, but when they move in to arrest him they only find a mannequin and evidence that he's been watching the police investigators this entire time by hacking the interceptors in their eyes. Elsewhere, Kusanagi meets with her friend Kurutan, a hospital nurse, to use her external memory device in an effort to learn more about The Laughing Man case. However, when the police Superintendent-General is set to give a speech about the Interceptor incident and the Laughing Man case, one of the officers present has his cyberbrain hacked by the Laughing Man. The Laughing Man demands that the Superintendent-General tell the truth, or he will be assassinated.
6	6	"C: The Copycat will Dance – MEME"; Transliteration: "Mohōsha wa Odoru – Mīmu" (Japanese: 模倣者は踊る MEME)	Masaki Tachibana	Junichi Fujisaku	December 1, 2002	December 12, 2004
The Superintendent-General's press conference quickly descends into chaos after the Laughing Man's assassination threat. Kusanagi suspects that the Laughing Man has inserted a virus into the police units assigned to guard the event. As Section 9 members struggle to evacuate the Superintendent-General to safety, the anti-virus team at HQ races to develop a vaccine to protect against it. However, random civilians begin joining in the assassination attempt as well, without any sort of external influence. After escorting the Superintendent-General to safety and apprehending all of the assassins, the police are left wondering about what caused dozens of completely unrelated people to attempt to murder a single man. After the immediate threat is averted, Aramaki orders Section 9 to open their own investigation into the Laughing Man case.
7	7	"SA: Idolatry – IDOLATOR"; Transliteration: "Gūzō Sūhai – Aidoreitā" (Japanese: 偶像崇拝 IDOLATER)	Atsushi Wakabayashi	Junichi Fujisaku	January 1, 2003	December 19, 2004
The Ministry of Home Affairs learns that Jenoma revolutionary leader Marcelo Jarti has been visiting Japan regularly every five months. Jarti is a drug trafficker and one of the world’s most wanted men, and has been targeted for assassination by commandos of the United States Delta Force and United Kingdom Special Air Service (SAS) a total of six times and has survived each of these attempts. When Jarti returns to Japan following the most recently failed assassination attempt, Section 9 is called in to follow him and determine why Jarti has been visiting their country. They discover that the real Jarti had died several months ago after using a ghost-dubbing device to create dozens of cybernetic clones of himself, and the yakuza running the cloning facility had kept releasing duplicates to prevent the Jenoma government from learning of their national hero's death. Section 9 captures the facility, but purposely allow the release of a new Jarti clone in order to maintain the global status quo.
8	8	"SA: The Fortunate Ones – MISSING HEARTS"; Transliteration: "Megumareshi Monotachi – Misshingu Hātsu" (Japanese: 恵まれし者たち MISSING HEARTS)	Kazunobu Fuseki	Yoshiki Sakurai	January 1, 2003	January 2, 2005
Kurutan calls the Major to the hospital where she works to look into the source of a young girl's heart transplant. The heart she received was given without consent of the owner's parents. The girl's doctors feared she might have had to be given a full-cyborg conversion, a thought that stirs painful memories for Kusanagi. Aramaki, believing that the culprits may be tied to a mass kidnapping ring, orders Section 9 to look into the case for connections between the organs, the company that sold them, and a local refugee camp set up at an abandoned oil refinery. Finally, the culprits are revealed to be a gang of rich medical students who have been illicitly stealing organs from cadavers. Before arresting them, Kusanagi decides to scare and humiliate the students by posing as a murderous yakuza enforcer. Note: The Jameson character who appears in this episode also appears regularly in the Tachikoma Days omake.
9	9	"C: The Man Who Dwells in the Shadows of the Net – CHAT! CHAT! CHAT!"; Transliteration: "Net no Yami ni Sumu Otoko – Chatto! Chatto! Chatto!" (Japanese: ネットの闇に棲む男 CHAT! CHAT! CHAT!)	Masaki Tachibana	Dai Satō	February 1, 2003	January 9, 2005
Using her net avatar, Kusanagi enters a chat room dedicated to the Laughing Man. Various theories are passed around the chat room as the members view various bits of evidence from the Laughing Man case. While in the chat room, Kusanagi homes in on an older man sitting at the table who seems to have more knowledge about the Laughing Man incidents than anyone else. After confronting the man and exchanging information with him, Kusanagi and one of the other guests are suddenly transferred out of the chat room and she briefly sees the Laughing Man.
10	10	"SA: A Perfect Day for a Jungle Cruise – JUNGLE CRUISE"; Transliteration: "Mitsurin Kōro ni Uttetsuke no Hi – Janguru Kurūzu" (Japanese: 密林航路にうってつけの日 JUNGLE CRUISE)	Jun Matsumoto	Dai Satō	February 1, 2003	January 16, 2005
Marco Amoretti, a former American Imperial Navy Petty Officer turned serial killer, has arrived in Japan and for the last two months has murdered several women by slicing the skin off their torsos in the form of a T-shirt. American CIA officers have been dispatched to Japan, ostensibly to assist Section 9 in their effort to track down and apprehend Amoretti before he can strike again. When the CIA officers show no surprise at the developments in the case, Ishikawa hacks into the CIA database and learns that Amoretti was part of an American Empire commando team sent into the jungles of South America to conduct a covert operation aimed at breaking an enemy’s will to fight by using terror tactics, such as flaying civilians alive. Elsewhere, Batou — an ex-JGSDF Ranger who has seen first-hand the horrors of the CIA operation — resolves to stop Amoretti by any means necessary, but his behaviour during the case leads to suspicion that Batou may attempt to kill Amoretti, rather than arrest him. However, this is exactly what the CIA wishes, since Amoretti is the only loose end that can tie them to the jungle operation. Amoretti's hideout in the sewers is discovered, and Batou gives chase in a running gun battle. Batou experiences vivid flashbacks during the chase, with the dank sewers intercutting with the steaming jungle where he first battled Amoretti years ago. Batou finally manages to corner Amoretti, who begs Batou to kill him. However, Batou remembers that he is a law enforcement officer first, and arrests Amoretti instead. The CIA agents, unhappy that things didn't go as planned, are forced to return home with Amoretti in tow. Note: This episode was initially skipped in the YTV broadcast in Canada because of the graphic content. It was later aired uncut on December 30, 2005 at 1:30 AM and ran at the regular 12AM time slot during the series' second run. The initial Adult Swim broadcast in the US included a disclaimer before the episode aired warning viewers about the contents.
11	11	"C: In The Forest of the Imagoes – PORTRAITZ"; Transliteration: "Aseichū no Mori de – Pōtoreitsu" (Japanese: 亜成虫の森で PORTRAITZ)	Toshiyuki Kawano	Yoshiki Sakurai	March 1, 2003	January 23, 2005
The Ministry of Health, Labour and Welfare's database has been hacked into, and classified material has been stolen. Section 9 traces the hack and determines that the hack job originated from a facility that helps people with Cyberbrain Closed Shell Syndrome. Togusa goes undercover to investigate the social welfare facility, and immediately encounters suspicious behaviour from the facility's supervisors. Togusa manages to learn that a person called "the Chief" visited the center during the week that the MHLW was hacked, but before he can determine the significance of this information Togusa is discovered; simultaneously, the facility's security system unexpectedly goes online, and Section 9’s databases are subsequently hacked, leading Kusanagi and Batou to make an emergency insertion to evacuate Togusa. The Chief is revealed to be the alter-ego of a boy named Aoi, who seems to have vanished after the incident, with no evidence remaining that he was ever a patient at the center, save for Togusa's testimony. But when Togusa draws Aoi's face from memory, the others are surprised to find that Togusa has drawn the infamous Laughing Man logo.
12	12	"SA: Tachikoma Runs Away; The Movie Director's Dream – ESCAPE FROM"; Transliteration: "Tachikoma no Iede, Eiga Kantoku no Yume – Esukēpu Furomu" (Japanese: タチコマの家出 映画監督の夢 ESCAPE FROM)	Masayuki Yoshihara	Yoshiki Sakurai	March 1, 2003	January 30, 2005
Early in the morning Batou's Tachikoma self-activates and leaves the Tachikoma storage bay to explore the outside world. While roaming the streets of Niihama, the Tachikoma encounters a young girl named Miki who is searching for her lost dog. The Tachikoma decides to help the girl, and together they manage to find the dog. While on their journey, the Tachikoma stumbles upon a cyberbrain being sold in a market that contains a ghost, and brings it back to the storage bay. When the Tachikoma returns to Section 9, technicians begin extensive tests to determine why the tank went AWOL in the first place, while Section 9 members turn their attention to the cyberbrain in an effort to determine what the brain contains. When one of the lab technicians investigating the brain links with it and becomes "lost," Kusanagi volunteers to go after the missing man, leading her to find the technician watching a movie that lacks a beginning or ending which brings her to tears. She then has a philosophical discussion with the man showing the movies. When she leaves, the team discovers that it was the brain of a stubborn film maker with a cult following.
13	13	"SA: Unequal Terrorist – NOT EQUAL"; Transliteration: "≠Terorisuto – Notto Ikōru" (Japanese: ≠テロリスト NOT EQUAL)	Kazunobu Fuseki	Shōtarō Suga	April 1, 2003	February 6, 2005
Sixteen years ago, Eka Tokura, the daughter of a pioneering cybernetics company's CEO, was kidnapped by the New World Brigade, a terrorist group opposed to cyberization. The girl's whereabouts remained a mystery until she was spotted by members of the Maritime Safety Team aboard an abandoned radiation scrubbing station off the coast of Okinawa. Four Special Security Team operators of the Japan Coast Guard were sent to find the girl and rescue her, but the team vanished without a trace. Section 9 is covertly dispatched to the island with two objectives: locate any remaining SST members and evacuate them, and find and rescue the missing girl. Section 9 is inserted by submarine, and after a time manages to find the girl, but when they do, they realize that something is wrong: the girl is the same age she was when she was kidnapped all those years ago. The terrorists soon discover that Section 9 has rescued their hostages, and a massive firefight ensues. The Section 9 team manages to escape and discovers that one of the hostages they rescued, an elderly woman, is the actual Eka Tokura, rapidly aged by the stress of life as a hostage, and that the girl leading the terrorists is her daughter.
14	14	"SA: Automated Capitalism – ¥€$"; Transliteration: "Zenjidō Shihonshugi – ¥€$" (Japanese: 全自動資本主義 ¥€$)	Hideyo Yamamoto	Kenji Kamiyama	April 1, 2003	February 13, 2005
Acting on a tip, Section 9 breaks up a cabal of thieves planning to rob a Japanese financial institution. Shortly after the raid, a Chinese intelligence official contacts Section 9 and informs them of suspicious activity that he believes may indicate an assassination attempt by Chinese Socialists on Kanemoto Yokose, a prominent, yet reclusive, Japanese billionaire. Section 9 is therefore tasked with protecting Yokose, a 56-year-old ex-mathematician who has amassed a fortune by playing the stock market. Section 9 and the assassin arrive within minutes of each other, but after reaching Yokose’s bedroom, both sides discover that Yokose died from a medical condition several months ago, and an advanced computer program had been managing his investments the whole time. Note: The symbols in the title "¥€$" refer to the Japanese yen, the euro, and the dollar, respectively.
15	15	"SA: Time of the Machines – MACHINES DÉSIRANTES"; Transliteration: "Kikaitachi no Jikan – Mashīnzu Dejirantesu" (Japanese: 機械たちの時間 MACHINES DESIRANTES)	Kenichi Takeshita	Yoshiki Sakurai	May 1, 2003	February 20, 2005
Kusanagi's reservations regarding Section 9's Tachikoma units comes to a head. She becomes disturbed by their behaviour, as their artificial intelligence agents appear to be developing too fast; she has additional concerns about the safety of retaining them in the unit for use in a battle situation. The Tachikomas become vaguely aware of Kusanagi's concerns, and attempt to avoid deactivation by hatching a bizarre scheme to appeal to Kusanagi and prevent their removal. When Batou is summoned to a conference by Kusanagi, he learns of the situation with the Tachikomas and is told that they will be disarmed and shipped back to the lab for analysis. Although unhappy with the decision, Batou has no choice but to comply with the order.
16	16	"SA: Chinks in the Armor of the Heart – Ag_{2}O"; Transliteration: "Kokoro no Sukima – Ag_{2}O" (Japanese: 心の隙間 Ag_{2}O)	Masaki Tachibana	Nobutoshi Terado	May 1, 2003	February 27, 2005
Sensitive information has been stolen from a U.S. Naval base, and the primary suspect is a former Paralympic silver medalist boxer named Pavlo Zaitsev, who works on the base as a hand-to-hand combat instructor. The Public Security office has instructed Batou to go undercover to spy on Zaitsev, a man whom he admires, to see if Zaitsev is somehow related to the missing information. Batou wants his suspicions to be wrong and for Zaitsev to be innocent. The assignment calls into question Batou's attitude on his duty towards Section 9 and the decisions it forces him to make. However, Batou discovers that Zaitsev is indeed the spy and reluctantly turns him in.
17	17	"SA: The True Reason For The Unfinished Love Affair – ANGELS' SHARE"; Transliteration: "Mikansei Love Romance no Shinsō – Enjeruzu' Shea" (Japanese: 未完成ラブロマンスの真相 ANGELS' SHARE)	Yasuhiro Geshi	Yoshiki Sakurai	June 1, 2003	March 6, 2005
Kusanagi and Aramaki are visiting London for an anti-terrorism conference. While there, Aramaki stops at a wine bank to visit an old friend of his, who asks for his help in breaking up a Mafia money laundering scheme involving the bank and an unknown third party. Before Aramaki can leave, two thieves break in and a hostage situation ensues. In an effort to not let their scheme be known, the Mafia attempts to have Aramaki and the bank staff killed during a police raid, while Kusanagi makes her own plans to rescue the chief and the others from certain death. Aramaki manages to convince the two amateur thieves to surrender, and the entire group takes shelter in a secret basement underneath the wine vault as the corrupt police officers raid the bank. Kusanagi manages to infiltrate the building and extract Aramaki, as well as the evidence needed to implicate the Mafia and their corrupt associates within the police department.
18	18	"SA: Assassination Duet – LOST HERITAGE"; Transliteration: "Ansatsu no Nijūsō – Rosuto Heritēji" (Japanese: 暗殺の二重奏 LOST HERITAGE)	Masayuki Yoshihara	Junichi Fujisaku	June 1, 2003	March 13, 2005
After a five-year wait, Chinese vice foreign minister Jin has been allowed access to the Kagoshima War Memorial in Japan. Jin is the first Chinese dignitary to be granted access to the site, but not everyone is happy with the decision, and before long a death threat is made against Jin. Elsewhere, Aramaki visits the grave of one of his deceased comrades, a Colonel in the GSDF. While at the cemetery, Aramaki encounters the Colonel’s daughter, who voices her concern over her brother Yu’s sudden behavioural changes. When Section 9 determines Yu to be the prime suspect in the assassination attempt, Kusanagi and Togusa are sent to apprehend him, but arrive too late to arrest Yu. Soon after, Aramaki receives a disturbing phone call from his dead friend, who has cheated death by merging his own ghost with his son's, and intends to avenge his wife's death during the war by assassinating Jin. Out of respect for the Chief, Section 9 resolves to do everything in their power to take Yu in alive, but there is concern among the team members that Yu may not give them that chance. They manage to stop Yu by hacking his cyberbrain and fooling him into thinking his mission was successful. However, he has been permanently traumatized after merging his ghost with his father's.
19	19	"SA: Embraced by a Disguised Net – CAPTIVATED"; Transliteration: "Gisōmō ni Dakarete – Kyaputibētido" (Japanese: 偽装網に抱かれて CAPTIVATED)	Minoru Ōhara	Shōtarō Suga	July 1, 2003	March 20, 2005
Former prime minister Kanzaki’s daughter has been abducted, and Section 9 is called in to investigate her disappearance. The prime suspect in the case is Blindfold Ivan, the pseudonym for the North Territories Russian Mafia. Blindfold Ivan uses the same modus operandi in its abductions: over a three-day period, multiple underage women are kidnapped and then shipped to chop shops where they are killed, and all organs and cybernetic pieces are taken to be sold on the black market. Kanzaki had previously downplayed these mass kidnappings and denied the existence of Blindfold Ivan in an effort to strengthen ties between Russia and Japan; however, he publicly reveals the kidnapping of his daughter at Aramaki’s request in order to save his daughter. The news abruptly changes the situation by thrusting the kidnapping ring's leader, an ex-SVR officer named Cruzkowa Bosyeltnov, into the center of a scandalous, nationwide media event. Bosyeltnov attempts to seek shelter at the Russian Embassy, but they are unwilling to give her asylum due to the political firestorm, resulting in her capture and the rescue of the kidnapped women. Later, Kusanagi theorizes Bosyeltnov somehow angered her superiors, who then tricked her into kidnapping Kanzaki's daughter to get her arrested.
20	20	"C: Vanished Medication – RE-VIEW"; Transliteration: "Kesareta Kusuri – Re-byū" (Japanese: 消された薬 RE-VIEW)	Toshiyuki Kawano	Dai Satō	July 1, 2003	March 27, 2005
After the events of "PORTRAITZ", Togusa uses J. D. Salinger's The Catcher in the Rye as a starting point and develops a theory that the Laughing Man is after something published on paper. Togusa receives permission to check out a Ministry of Health, Labour, and Welfare (MHLW) records building and stumbles upon a key piece of evidence: a list of Cyberbrain Sclerosis patients treated with a secret medication, known as the Murai Vaccine, has disappeared from the MHLW. Togusa traces the missing list to a group called the Sunflower Society, where he learns that several prominent Japanese citizens have been secretly treated with the experimental medication. Elsewhere, the head of the Japanese DEA unit dispatches the Narcotics Suppression Squad to eliminate the members of the Sunflower Society and recover the missing list. When the squad storms the Sunflower Society’s building, Togusa ends up getting caught in the massacre. He manages to escape, but receives a serious gunshot wound in the process, and collapses on the street a few blocks away.
21	21	"C: Left-Behind Trace – ERASER"; Transliteration: "Okizari no Kiseki – Irēzā" (Japanese: 置き去りの軌跡 ERASER)	Kenichi Takeshita	Dai Satō	August 3, 2003	April 3, 2005
Togusa finds himself in the hospital after being shot, but is desperate to impart what he has learned to the rest of the group. By diving into Togusa’s memories, Section 9 experiences the DEA raid against the Sunflower Society firsthand, prompting anger and rage. The Chief takes it upon himself to notify the head of the DEA of Togusa’s presence at the Sunflower Society building during the raid, prompting the DEA chief to order the Narcotics Suppression Squad (NSS) to the house of Dr. Hisashi Imakurusu. Dr. Imakurusu had overseen the board that denied the Murai Vaccine; after being diagnosed with Cyberbrain Sclerosis, he began using the vaccine in secret and subsequently went into hiding. Section 9 believes Dr. Imakurusu may hold a clue to unraveling the entire Laughing Man case, and undertake a desperate search to locate him. With the aid of the American Empire and their unique surveillance satellites, Section 9 manages to find the doctor, and Batou volunteers to go after him. When both parties arrive at Dr. Imakurusu's location, a massive gunfight breaks out between the NSS and Section 9. Though they are unable to prevent Dr. Imakurusu's assassination, Section 9 manages to get the evidence they need to take action against the DEA.
22	22	"C: Corporate Graft – SCANDAL"; Transliteration: "Gigoku – Sukyandaru" (Japanese: 疑獄 SCANDAL)	Masaki Tachibana	Junichi Fujisaku	August 3, 2003	April 10, 2005
The Head of the DEA is arrested for murder in connection with the raid at the Sunflower Society building. Aramaki orders Section 9 to go through all of the facility's records to determine who are the remaining members of the Narcotics Suppression Squad. As Aramaki leaves the building he shares an elevator ride with former prime minister Kanzaki, who privately discloses that the prime suspect "pulling the strings" has a lot of friends in high places and strong connections to the navy. Elsewhere, the remaining members of the Narcotic Suppression Squad attempt to frame Aramaki with drug trafficking, concocting a story about his homeless brother to lure him to the refugee district and arrest him, but their plan fails when Batou rescues the chief before the police arrive on the scene. Meanwhile, Kusanagi seeks to repair her prosthetic body after incurring severe damage in a battle against the government's latest prototype power armor. Her plan is to perform a simple body swap, but the doctor in charge of the procedure is in reality an NSS agent intent on killing her by erasing her ghost. However, before Kusanagi is killed, the Laughing Man arrives, ghost-hacking the assassin and completing the Major's body swap, allowing her to subdue the assassin herself after he leaves.
23	23	"C: The Other Side of Good and Evil – EQUINOX"; Transliteration: "Zen'aku no Higan – Ikuinokkusu" (Japanese: 善悪の彼岸 EQUINOX)	Jun Matsumoto	Junichi Fujisaku	September 1, 2003	April 17, 2005
The Laughing Man returns to kidnap Ernest Serano, the CEO of Serano Genomics, just as he did six years before. Returning to the café where Serano was first kidnapped, he and the Laughing Man share the story of the events leading up to the kidnapping and the events following it. During the conversation, the Laughing Man asks Serano why he never fulfilled his promise to tell the truth about the Murai Vaccine, and in response Serano informs the Laughing Man that the whole time, he was under house arrest. Meanwhile, Section 9 determines the Secretary General Yakushima to be the man behind the Laughing Man scandal, and resolve to take Serano into protective custody to obtain his testimony. When the team discovers that Serano has been kidnapped by the Laughing Man again, they mount a frantic search to find and secure him. At the end of the episode, it is revealed that the Laughing Man was actually the Major in disguise using the memories that the real Laughing Man had given her, and that the entire operation, combined with Serano's conversation with "the Laughing Man", was Section 9's plot to confirm Serano Genomics' dealings with Secretary General Yakushima.
24	24	"C: Sunset in the Lonely City – ANNIHILATION"; Transliteration: "Kojō Rakujitsu – Anaiareishon" (Japanese: 孤城落日 ANNIHILATION)	Yasuhiro Geshi	Yoshiki Sakurai	September 1, 2003	April 24, 2005
Having learned the entire truth behind the Laughing Man Incident from the Laughing Man himself, and confirming the information with Serano, Section 9 is finally ready to make their move against the man behind the corporate terrorism: standing Secretary General Yakushima. However, Yakushima has learned of Section 9’s planned move, and has leaked the existence of the group to the press in an effort to cast the organization in a bad light. When Aramaki arrives to speak with the Prime Minister, he presents the incriminating evidence against Yakushima, expecting the Prime Minister to take action and remove Yakushima from office. However, the Lower House elections are entering a crucial stage, and without the support of his party in that House, the Prime Minister is uncertain of his ability to have Yakushima removed from office and arrested for his crimes. To counter this, the Prime Minister decides to use the Special Forces Restriction Bill against Section 9 in an effort to improve his party’s image, with the promise that he will take action after the elections have been completed. An alarmed Aramaki reluctantly agrees to the plan, and informs the Major of the impending raid on their headquarters, instructing her and the team to survive no matter what. Shortly after his departure from the Prime Minister's office, Aramaki and Togusa become the first two members of Section 9 to be captured by the government. Elsewhere, a JMSDF carrier and three escorts arrive in the waters off Niihama City. Aboard the carrier the Umibozu, an elite JMSDF Black Ops unit adept at paramilitary operations, prepares to storm Section 9 with armoured combat suits and assault choppers. After exchanging fire with the Umibozu, the assembled members of Section 9 feign a suicide attempt before escaping to the basement. Kusanagi briefs them on the Chief's last instructions before officially disbanding Section 9.
25	25	"C: Smoke of Gunpowder, Hail of Bullets – BARRAGE"; Transliteration: "Shōendan'u – Barēji" (Japanese: 硝煙弾雨 BARRAGE)	Kazunobu Fuseki	Yoshiki Sakurai	October 1, 2003	May 1, 2005
Aramaki has been released under his own recognizance, and meets with the head of the Ministry of Justice to explain the situation and ask for help in ensuring his team's safety, but the Minister of Justice is powerless to affect the situation beyond the prosecution of Yakushima. Elsewhere, Saito and Ishikawa are caught in separate traps set by Umibozu teams, but not before successfully dispersing information seeds given to them by the Major. With Batou and Kusanagi as the only uncaptured members of Section 9, Batou undertakes a risky sortie to the Major's apartment to recover her sentimentally-valued watch. Before he can escape, Umibozu commandos arrive and a firefight ensues. Batou successfully fends off the first wave of attacks, but is unexpectedly confronted with two armoured combat suits, the second of which proves to be more than he can handle. Just when it seems that Batou will be killed, help arrives from the Tachikomas. Having witnessed the attack on Section 9, the three remaining Tachikomas rendezvous at the remains of Section 9's headquarters, and after a time manage to find Batou at Kusanagi's apartment. The Tachikoma tanks resolve to protect Batou at any cost, ultimately sacrificing themselves to save his life. Meanwhile, Kusanagi arrives to salvage the Tachikomas' memory chips and evacuate a badly injured Batou, taking him to her hideout where she stores her remote bodies. Batou returns Kusanagi's watch and she puts it on her wrist. After taken care of his wounds, both make plans to leave the country, but the Umibozu, acting on orders from the Cabinet, attempt to assassinate Kusanagi at the airport. Though the assassination appears to be successful, it is revealed that the Major's decapitated body wasn't wearing her watch, indicating that she was piloting one of her spare bodies remotely from her safehouse.
26	26	"C: Public Security Section 9, Once Again – STAND ALONE COMPLEX"; Transliteration: "Kōan Kyūka, Futatabi – Sutando Arōn Conpurekkusu" (Japanese: 公安9課,再び STAND ALONE COMPLEX)	Toshiyuki Kawano	Dai Satō	October 1, 2003	May 8, 2005
The dismantling of Section 9, spun by the media as a JSDF preemptive strike against a radical security unit planning a coup, provides the Prime Minister with the public support his party needs to win the Lower House elections. Immediately after the election, in keeping with his promise, the Prime Minister discloses the information regarding The Laughing Man case, fingering Yakushima as the ringleader. Three months pass, during which Togusa tries to come to terms with all that has happened with Section 9. In his attempts to find information on the rest of the team, he learns that the Major was killed and the remaining members of Section 9 are serving time in a state prison for high treason. The news upsets Togusa, and he resolves to assassinate the man responsible for Section 9's dissolution. Togusa intends to catch Yakushima as he arrives at the ruling party’s headquarters, but before Togusa can follow through with his plan, he is stopped by Batou, who brings Togusa to Section 9’s temporary headquarters. Here, Togusa is informed that Kusanagi is alive and Section 9's disbandment and destruction was merely a ploy. Elsewhere, Kusanagi and Aramaki meet with Aoi, the young man Togusa encountered at the MHLW facility, who turns out to be the true identity of the Laughing Man. Aramaki offers Aoi a job at Section 9 for his outstanding hacking skills, but Aoi politely refuses, claiming he is not a team player and wishing to remain at his current job with the public library to sort through and read its collection of books. Public Security Section 9 once more becomes an active security unit of the Japanese government, and its members settle back into the routines they had at the beginning of the series.

=== Season 2: S.A.C. 2nd GIG (2004–05) ===
No. overall	No. in season	Title	Directed by	Written by	Original release date	English air date
27	1	"DI: Reactivation – REEMBODY"; Transliteration: "Saikidō – Rīmubodī" (Japanese: 再起動 REEMBODY)	Masaki Tachibana	Yoshiki Sakurai	January 1, 2004	November 20, 2005
Two years have passed since the Umibozu forcibly disbanded Section 9. In that time, Section 9's members have regrouped, reconstructed their headquarters, and resumed their previous role as a special-forces team specializing in cyber warfare. However, the reformed group operates without the official consent of the Japanese government, because the Special Forces Restriction Bill forced the group to separate. This changes abruptly when a skyscraper containing the Chinese Embassy is stormed by a group of terrorists identifying themselves as the "Individual Eleven". The terrorists quickly take several people hostage and demand that the prime minister issue a statement announcing the discontinuation of the Refugee Special Action Policy. The Special Assault Team is summoned to the scene of the standoff, but the situation proves to be more than they can handle, and before long one of the SAT officers is captured. When the terrorists set a deadline for their demands and threaten to execute the hostages, the newly elected Prime Minister, Yoko Kayabuki, takes matters into her own hands and instructs Aramaki to have Section 9 storm the building with the promise that she will reinstate Section 9 if the team can resolve the incident without casualties among the strategically positioned hostages. Section 9 pulls off the operation without a hitch and they become an official law enforcement unit again. The episode ends with the return of the Tachikomas to the ranks of Section 9.
28	2	"DI: Well-Fed Me – NIGHT CRUISE"; Transliteration: "Hōshoku no Shimobe – Naito Kurūzu" (Japanese: 飽食の僕 NIGHT CRUISE)	Kenichi Takeshita	Shōtarō Suga	January 1, 2004	November 27, 2005
Following the nuclear World War III and the non-nuclear World War IV, Japan passed an act known as the Refugee Special Action Policy, inviting war refugees from all across Asia to enter Japan. Thousands of Asian refugees took Japan up on the offer to enter their country, and have taken low-paying jobs handed out to them by various companies looking for a cheap work force. Gino, a combat pilot and World War IV veteran, is one such refugee, working as a helicopter pilot for a corporate CEO. He is angry and depressed and plots revenge against Japanese society, starting with assassinating his employer. When Section 9 is sent to investigate his plots, Kusanagi eventually concludes that Gino lacks the fortitude to act out his fantasies, and is just one in the long line of pitiful souls who dream about fulfilling goals they can never accomplish. Note: The episode contains strong references to the film Taxi Driver, which has many similar themes (a returning ex-soldier, scarred by a war the public wants to forget, and focusing his anger outwardly into fantasies of revenge and bloodshed).
29	3	"DI: Saturday Night and Sunday Morning – CASH EYE"; Transliteration: "Doyō no Yoru to Nichiyō no Asa – Kyasshu Ai" (Japanese: 土曜の夜と日曜の朝 CASH EYE)	Kazunobu Fuseki	Dai Satō	February 7, 2004	December 4, 2005
A formal investigation into millionaire businessman Mr. Tadokoro has yielded evidence that he may be managing former Secretary General Yakushima's assets. This prompts the government to launch its own investigation into the allegations, but there are two problems. First, Tadokoro's vault is state of the art, and only he can access the assets in the vault. The other, more immediate concern is that a hacker and thief by the name of Cash Eye plans on infiltrating the vault during an exclusive high society party. To keep Cash Eye from stealing and/or destroying valuable evidence, Section 9 is called in to prevent the theft. However, the Cash Eye threat is revealed to be a ploy by Section 9 to find a cache of illegally laundered money, with Kusanagi posing as Cash Eye. They trick Tadokoro into opening his own vault, where they find the money. Note: The overall plot and some of the scenes in this episode pay homage to the manga Cat's Eye.
30	4	"DU: Natural Enemy – NATURAL ENEMY"; Transliteration: "Tenteki – Nachiruru Enemī" (Japanese: 天敵 NATURAL ENEMY)	Masayuki Yoshihara	Junichi Fujisaku	February 7, 2004	December 11, 2005
The largest live fire exercise ever conducted by the Japanese Self Defense Force takes place in advance of the Prime Minister's planned announcement of the repealing of the Refugee Special Action Policy. As part of this exercise, a group of soldiers with the Ground Self Defense Force have staged a 5:30 AM practice raid against a building where a simulated refugee terrorist group is alleged to be keeping a think tank. A Jigabachi assault helicopter is dispatched to destroy the tank, but after firing an anti-tank missile into the target, the pilot of the helicopter suffers a massive heart attack, and the Jigabachi begins to spin out of control. The on-board Artificial Intelligence gets the helicopter back under control, and the military officers running the drill decide to abort it out of concern for the safety of their troops. However, the AI aboard the Jigabachi refuses to acknowledge the order to return to its parent JMSDF aircraft carrier. Acting on the assumption that the chopper is under attack, the AI overrides the flight controls of other armed Jigabachi aircraft, an air tanker from the carrier, and several nearby military bases, ordering these units into a tight defence formation in the heart of the Niihama Refugee Residential District. By 8:45 AM the situation has escalated; the Jigabachis have openly engaged anyone and anything the AI has designated as a threat, and if the choppers do not leave the area soon, they will not have enough fuel to make the return trip to their bases. Section 9 and the Ground Self Defense Force are placed on standby in anticipation of being ordered in to resolve the conflict when Aramaki is unexpectedly approached by Kazundo Goda, the head of the Cabinet Intelligence Service, who explains that the probable reason for the helicopter AI's refusal to comply with the stand down order is that the AI is still receiving transmissions from the dead pilot's cyberbrain. Acting on this assumption, Goda transfers control of the situation to Section 9, and outlines a plan that calls for Batou and Kusanagi to take a handful of Tachikoma tanks and lure the Jigabachi out to a secluded area of the refugee district, allowing Saito to snipe the deceased pilot's head, destroying his cyberbrain. Wasting no time, Section 9 puts the plan into action, but though they manage to recall the helicopters, the damage has been done. The incident serves to strain relations between the refugees and the government, and Section 9 begins to suspect a conspiracy.
31	5	"IN: Those Who Have the Motive – INDUCTANCE"; Transliteration: "Dōki aru Monotachi – Indakutansu" (Japanese: 動機ある者たち INDUCTANCE)	Kenichi Takeshita	Dai Satō & Kenji Kamiyama	March 6, 2004	December 18, 2005
Prime Minister Kayabuki has formally renounced the Refugee Special Action Policy; a move that has drawn much criticism from refugees all over Japan. While on a tour of Dejima Island, a major center for the refugee population, the Prime Minister receives an assassination threat, and Aramaki is summoned to Fukuoka to offer his insight. The cabinet wants Section 9 to protect the Prime Minister, a role the team reluctantly agrees to. Meanwhile, Ishikawa and Togusa uncover interesting information on the ideology of the Individual Eleven terrorist group. It seems the organization has ties to the May 15 Incident, in which a group of army officers assassinated a former Prime Minister and then gained support from the general population for their undying conviction in their beliefs. Elsewhere, the Prime Minister arrives at a Buddhist Temple to meditate, but is unexpectedly confronted by an assassin. Thanks to a swift response from Kusanagi and Batou, Kayabuki is spared certain death, but in the ensuing chaos the assassin manages to elude Section 9.
32	6	"DI: Latent Heat Source – EXCAVATION"; Transliteration: "Senzai Netsugen – Ekusukabēshon" (Japanese: 潜在熱源 EXCAVATION)	Toshiyuki Kawano	Junichi Fujisaku & Kenji Kamiyama	March 6, 2004	January 8, 2006
The prime suspect behind an attempt to blackmail the Ministry of Energy has turned up dead in Niihama City, ostensibly the victim of a tragic accident; however a more thorough examination of the body turns up evidence of homicide. Togusa follows up on the death of the suspect, and obtains "photographic evidence" which the man had intended to use against the Ministry of Energy; however the film the pictures were taken with has been exposed to light, and subsequently turned completely black. With most members of Section 9 still assigned to guard the Prime Minister, Togusa is given a Tachikoma and sent to the Shinjuku Refugee District of New Tokyo to investigate the photo lead. After an accidental encounter with the dead man's fiancée Asagi, the two of them decide to investigate the death together. They learn that the man, named Kontan Kanji, had accepted a mysterious job in exchange for the promise of a new cyber body, and had been put to work descaling the walls of a subterranean structure in the Uchikon 7 district, which was submerged in the last war. Although the Ground Self Defense Army is now guarding the primary entrance to the site, Togusa and Asagi manage to enter the facility through an alternate, unguarded entrance with the help of one of Kontan's former co-workers. After descending into the heart of the building, Togusa discovers that the building is actually an old nuclear power plant and the "photographic evidence" was not a photo but a radiation badge. Someone has authorized the excavation of this pre-war relic, but their identity remains unknown. They flee the scene and manage to contact Section 9, where a formal investigation into the facility is started. However, when he tries to contact her later, Togusa discovers that Asagi has disappeared.
33	7	"DU: The Rhapsodic Melody of a Bygone Nation – ^{239}Pu"; Transliteration: "Kyōsō wa Bōkoku no Shirabe – Pu239" (Japanese: 狂想は亡国の調べ Pu239)	Itsuro Kawasaki	Junichi Fujisaku & Kenji Kamiyama	April 3, 2004	January 15, 2006
Prime Minister Kayabuki summons Aramaki after plans to ship plutonium from Uchikon 7 are leaked to refugee terrorists. Despite a Coast Guard raid that managed to halt a weapons sale to the terrorists, there are lingering worries that they may still attempt to capture the plutonium. To counter this, Section 9 is covertly assigned the mission of escorting the material out of the refugee district. Commanding the operation is Kazundo Goda, who accompanies Section 9 to oversee the transfer. He and the team are inserted into the refugee district by paradrop, and arrive at GSDA checkpoint, where they are redressed in clothes befitting refugees and tasked with guarding a beat-up SUV and shuttle bus commandeered by other members of Section 9 for the purpose of moving the plutonium. Meanwhile, Goda discusses the mission with the commanding officer of the GSDA unit, who assigns three men to help Section 9 with their transport of the plutonium. The team departs from the camp and proceeds to head out of the refugee district via the beltway and interstate. Along the way the team encounters several of the refugees who live in poverty within Shinjuku. During the trip out of the district, the team encounters a rollover accident involving a garbage truck, prompting Section 9 members to exit their vehicles and investigate further. During a conversation with the refugees near the truck, a GSDA member mistakes a bent pipe in the hands of one refugee for a pistol, and an ensuing shootout results in the needless death of several refugees and ill feelings among the group. These feelings are further increased when, after arriving at the intended destination, the team discovers that they were used as decoys, and the plutonium Section 9 believed they were guarding was in fact shipped by sea.
34	8	"DI: Vegetarian Dinner – FAKE FOOD"; Transliteration: "Soshoku no Bansan – Fēku Fūdo" (Japanese: 素食の晩餐 FAKE FOOD)	Kazunobu Fuseki	Dai Satō & Kenji Kamiyama	April 3, 2004	January 22, 2006
Tired of Goda's manipulation, Aramaki decides to take the initiative and conduct his own investigation into the Individual Eleven case while simultaneously looking into the Cabinet Intelligence Agency. Section 9 is split into two teams, one focused on digging up additional info on the two cases and the other tasked with locating an ex-GSDA officer identified as a person of interest in a series of shootings at a local TV station. While on a stakeout of a Taiwanese vegetarian restaurant, Batou and Togusa find out that Section 1 has been fed false information about the same ex-GSDA soldier, and have set out to kill him on the assumption that the man is a world-renowned terrorist. Batou and Togusa arrive too late to save the man, and both sides determine that someone behind the scenes is feeding disinformation to both Section 9 and Section 1.
35	9	"DU: The Hope Named Despair – AMBIVALENCE"; Transliteration: "Zetsubō to Iu Na no Kibō – Anbibarensu" (Japanese: 絶望という名の希望 AMBIVALENCE)	Kenichi Takeshita	Dai Satō, Kenji Kamiyama & Yūichirō Matsuka	May 1, 2004	January 29, 2006
After the failed attempt to bring the ex-GSDA officer in for questioning, Kusanagi decides to hack into the Cabinet Intelligence Agency database to directly determine what Goda is up to. With the help of Tachikomas, who mount an assault on the building's defense barriers, Kusanagi hacks into the Cabinet Intelligence Agency Server Decatonchire to uncover Goda's motives. During her subsequent meeting with Goda, she learns that he once had ambitions to be counted among the powerful, but has since resigned himself to never having that position. He aims to create a new hero for the masses, someone whom they can identify with beyond simply knowing that person's face or name. Goda expects this person to take command of the situation he is currently creating and bring about some type of conflict which he believes will benefit Japan in the long run by returning the country to its former glory. Elsewhere, Batou, Borma, and Togusa are out to stop a suicide bomber, but so far have only been playing catchup, until Batou trusts a hunch and has the Chief check out the local surveillance systems for people thought to be the bombers. His hunch pays off, as the images of the bombers reveal all of them to be refugees, prompting Aramaki to issue warnings to all police districts in the city to watch for refugees acting suspiciously. One such refugee turns up at a subway station claiming she has a bomb. Batou and Togusa arrive to find the woman surrounded by SAT officers. Togusa has nearly convinced her to surrender when Batou arrives and forcefully subdues the woman by shooting her. It is revealed that the bomb is in her stomach, linked to a trigger inside an artificial tooth, and she is taken to a medical center to have the bomb surgically removed.
36	10	"DI: One Angry Man – TRIAL"; Transliteration: "Ikareru Otoko – Toraiaru" (Japanese: イカレルオトコ TRIAL)	Toshiyuki Kawano	Yoshiki Sakurai	May 1, 2004	February 5, 2006
On his way home from work, Togusa becomes involved in a domestic dispute between a woman and her boyfriend when the woman runs in front of Togusa's car and screams for help. Trying to protect the woman, Togusa fires several rounds into her assailant's prosthetic limbs in an effort to disable him; despite this, Togusa fails to prevent the woman's death. Since Togusa carried out the shooting while off-duty, a preliminary hearing is convened to ascertain the facts in the case. The suspect's parents hire a well-known lawyer to defend their son, who wastes no time attempting to make Togusa look bad, first by criticizing his choice of handgun and then by claiming that Togusa acted out of a subconscious hatred for cyborgs while making the excuse that the defendant suffered from defective prosthetic parts. When Section 9 sets out to clear Togusa's name they stumble across some interesting information about the suspect's lawyer. Apparently he has been secretly colluding with prosthetics companies to rig and bury product defect lawsuits. In addition he is likely acting under orders from the CIS to use the case to pull all of Section 9 into court to embroil them in a humiliating public scandal. Kusanagi threatens to expose these secrets in court, which prompts the lawyer to drop his charges against Togusa, while the state formally brings murder charges against the suspect. However, the lawyer and his client are later severely injured in a car accident, implied to have been set up by Section 9 in retaliation for Togusa's public humiliation.
37	11	"IN: Grass Labyrinth – AFFECTION"; Transliteration: "Kusa Meikyū – Afekushon" (Japanese: 草迷宮 AFFECTION)	Jun Matsumoto	Yutaka Ōmatsu & Kenji Kamiyama	June 5, 2004	February 12, 2006
Batou and Togusa test eight potential new recruits for Section 9. The men are placed in pairs to create four different teams, each tasked with tracking Major Kusanagi. However, Kusanagi proves to be a difficult target to track, and eventually she loses all four teams. Shortly after shaking off the last team, Kusanagi unexpectedly loses all communication and finds herself lost in a seemingly empty part of the city. While trying to locate her team, she happens across a shop that stores people's external memories, and hears the story of two child prosthetic bodies carefully preserved in the shop. The bodies once belong to a boy and a girl who were involved in a terrible plane crash, leaving the two children the only survivors of the wreck after the other mortally wounded passengers die. While the boy was in the hospital he learned that he had been paralyzed except for his left hand, which he used to make origami cranes non-stop for the girl. One day, the girl, who had been in a coma since arriving in the hospital, unexpectedly went downhill fast, and was moved to the OR. The boy believed that she had died, but two years later a girl his age was brought to the hospital in an effort to convince the boy to switch to a full-cyborg prosthetic body, after previous attempts by a relative and doctors to convince him had failed. The boy was reluctant to do so at first because the girl had difficulty with the fine motor skills of her own new body, but he eventually relented and accepted the prosthetic body, after realizing the girl visiting him was the very same one from the crash who he believed had died. Years later the boy, who had been searching for the girl since he left the hospital, happened across her childhood prosthetic in a lab and took it upon himself to preserve it. When Kusanagi inquires as to the current whereabouts of the boy, she learns that he was shipped out in the last days of the war, and has not been heard from since. Before Kusanagi leaves, she carefully folds a sugar cube wrapper into an origami crane and places it in the car beside the body of the boy, saying "I'll bet that even now... that girl is still searching for the first boy she ever loved."
38	12	"IN: To Those Without Even a Name... – SELECON"; Transliteration: "Na mo Naki Mono e – Serekon" (Japanese: 名も無き者へ SELECON)	Masaki Tachibana	Yutaka Ōmatsu & Kenji Kamiyama	June 5, 2004	February 19, 2006
The Tachikomas locate a stealth gate accessible only through the European satellite system; after passing through the gate, Borma recovers a suspicious file believed to be the virus that infected the Individual Eleven. Ishikawa and Borma attempt to figure out how the virus in the file affects its victims by using the external memories of an infected Individual Eleven member. They succeed in learning that the virus is activated by reading all of Patrick Sylvester's previous essays in addition to The Individual Eleven, but in making this discovery Borma is seemingly rendered comatose by the virus. Meanwhile, Togusa is sent to search for a written copy of "The Individual Eleven", the political essay bearing the same name as the terrorist group, but no matter where he looks, no one seems to be able produce an actual written copy of The Individual Eleven. When Togusa decides to make one last stop, he unexpectedly finds himself confronting a suicidal man who has become infected with the virus, and learns from him that there never was a written essay by that name. Elsewhere, Kusanagi, Batou and Saito have been dispatched to Kagoshima after the man behind the attempt on the prime minister's life unexpectedly turns up on an IR system near the city. The man, named Hideo Kuze, has gone there to rendezvous with the other leaders of the Individual Eleven. Section 9 intends to arrest Kuze at the Kagoshima war memorial, but Kuze and the other assembled members of the Individual Eleven leave before Section 9 arrives. As Kuze and the Individual Eleven drive to Kyūshū they share the stories of their crimes to pass the time, until they reach the Kyūshū Radio Tower. Upon reaching the roof of the tower, the group commits mass suicide by mutual decapitation with katana on live television. Kuze, however, fights off his partner and escapes. Note: The English dub of this episode contains a continuity error. Upon arriving at the Kagoshima war memorial, Batou asks aloud, "What the hell was Kuze doing here?". However, Section 9 does not learn Kuze's name until the following episode.
39	13	"DI: Face – MAKE UP"; Transliteration: "Kao – Mēku Appu" (Japanese: 顔 MAKE UP)	Itsuro Kawasaki	Yutaka Ōmatsu & Kenji Kamiyama	July 3, 2004	February 26, 2006
Aramaki calls a briefing to discuss the events surrounding the sudden appearance and mass suicide of the leaders of the Individual Eleven. Techs briefing the team think that the sole survivor of the group may be using a unique face made by a face-sculptor with an artistic background. Only two known people in the area have the skill to create a face of that caliber, making Section 9's job somewhat easier. Unfortunately, when Batou and Togusa arrive to speak with one of the sculptors, they find him dead at the hands of someone imitating Paz. Section 9 sets out to clear his name, while ordering Paz to keep a low profile until the case is solved. When a detective working the face sculptor's murder turns up dead, Paz asks to see the client list for the dead sculptor, and happens across the name and face of an ex-lover. Paz tracks her down and learns from the woman that after he left her for no apparent reason, she became obsessed with him and eventually created an exact copy of his body and face. The two fight and one is killed in the struggle. Kusanagi asks Batou if he thinks the winner was the real Paz. Batou replies, "Probably."
40	14	"DI: Beware the Left Eye – POKER FACE"; Transliteration: "Hidarime ni Ki o Tsukero – Pōkā Feisu" (Japanese: 左眼に気をつけろ POKER FACE)	Masayuki Yoshihara	Yoshiki Sakurai & Kenji Kamiyama	July 3, 2004	March 5, 2006
Representatives from the American Empire have arrived in Japan to discuss a new security treaty, and Section 9 plays a part in securing the building where the talks are taking place. In their downtime, members of the different security teams are in the midst of a poker game, but so far Saito has won every hand. Intrigued by this, the Tachikomas assigned to the security truck shift their discussion from the reason for the new security treaty to the reason that Saito is consistently winning at a game of chance. For a raise in the game, Saito offers to share the story of how he acquired his poker face and why it's helping him win. In 2020, the American Empire invaded Central America in an effort to stop the drug trade. Tired of Japan's lack of involvement in the war, Saito decided to hire himself out as a mercenary, and was picked up by a group fighting to keep Mexico's provisional government in place. One day Saito caught wind of a Special Forces team, which happens to be a force of UN Peacekeepers, with a tactical nuclear weapon that would be passing through the destroyed remains of (Monterrey), where Saito was stationed. Saito decided to engage the group, and managed to kill a total of three people before the spec ops team determined his location. Headed by Kusanagi, the remaining members of the team stormed the hospital Saito was camped out in, but not before he managed to kill two more men. Outnumbered and cornered, Saito believed that Kusanagi would likely kill him in a one-on-one shootout, but believed that she lacked the necessary software to snipe him at medium range. Saito tried to engage Kusanagi before she could download the midrange sniping software, only for her to disable him by shooting out his left eye. Kusanagi explained that she already had the software, and had intentionally acted as though she didn't to lure Saito out and neutralize him. Impressed with his ability, Kusanagi took Saito with her, which was how he ended up working for Section 9. As the episode comes to a close, the possibility arises that the story which Saito just told was completely fabricated, perhaps using the plot of an old movie (the episode's plot closely resembles the final act of Full Metal Jacket), but when Saito wins the next round as well, the Tachikomas wonder if he may have been telling the truth after all.
41	15	"DI: Afternoon of the Machines – PAT."; Transliteration: "Kikaitachi no Gogo – Patto." (Japanese: 機械たちの午後 PAT.)	Kenichi Takeshita	Yoshiki Sakurai & Kenji Kamiyama	August 7, 2004	March 12, 2006
Section 9's Tachikoma fleet is down for routine maintenance. While the technicians inspect the fleet, the think-tanks begin a philosophical discussion on the Individual Eleven case and the implications and motives behind it. Gradually, this discussion shifts to the topic of the self and the reason that the Tachikomas have felt the sensation of looking down on themselves. Meanwhile, Togusa, Batou, Batou's personal Tachikoma, and Kusanagi report to SPring-8 to gather evidence collected by the staff from the ten deceased members of the Individual Eleven. While there, an explosion rocks the facility, and Batou, Togusa, and the Tachikoma dash to the scene. Having learned that a man named Asuda may have been in the building, the team regroups aboard the tiltrotor for a trip to Niihama Airport. Along the way Batou and Togusa learn from Kusanagi that Asuda is the inventor of the Tachikoma AI, and may be attempting to defect to North America to obtain patent rights, which he cannot get in Japan as a state-sponsored scientist. Asuda is taken into custody in the airport lobby, and on the return leg of the trip to Niihama shares an important secret about the origin of the Tachikoma AI system with the team before bonding with Batou's Tachikoma. Asuda's information helps solve the mysterious "out of body" feeling the Tachikomas have been experiencing; it turns out that this new fleet's AI and central server are located on a satellite in space. He also admits that he had secretly inserted a program into the Tachikomas so that they instinctively remember him as a way to have his achievements recognized, prompting Kusanagi to order him to remove it.
42	16	"IN: The Fact of Being There – ANOTHER CHANCE"; Transliteration: "Soko ni Iru Koto – Anazā Chansu" (Japanese: そこにいること ANOTHER CHANCE)	Masaki Tachibana	Kenji Kamiyama	August 7, 2004	March 19, 2006
The Prime Minister calls a meeting of her cabinet to discuss the refugee situation. During the meeting several cabinet members attempt to distance themselves from the problem, while top-ranking military officials and local law enforcement voice their concern over the sudden influx of refugees to Dejima Island. When a recess is called the Prime Minister meets with Aramaki and Kusanagi, who alert her to the existence of "cyberbrain hubs". During her briefing with Aramaki, the Prime Minister reveals that her lack of clout is being taken advantage of by some members of her cabinet and exploited for their own ends. It seems that some members of the cabinet are attempting to force Kayabuki out of the picture, and Section 9 is asked to look into the matter. Meanwhile, Ishikawa returns from the Korean Peninsula and briefs the rest of Section 9 on what he found out about Kuze's past. During the war Kuze was in the Ground Self Defense Army, and was deployed to Korea shortly after the country unified to safeguard the North Territories from the retreating People's Army. Kuze was assigned to a mechanized battalion, and his unit saw action in defense of a refugee village along a river near the Korea-China border. Since Article 9 of the Japanese Constitution prevents Japan's military from deploying overseas in any official capacity, a press blackout had been in effect, but this worked against Kuze's unit when rumors began to circulate that they were somehow involved in the slaughter of the refugees. One day, Kuze exchanged his gun for a camera and went into the refugee camp near his base, and after a time became an accepted and well-liked member of the refugee community there. When the GSDA forces received orders to head home, Kuze disappeared, presumably heading over the border into China. Ishikawa reports that the last known location for Kuze was in Taiwan, and the briefing concludes.
43	17	"DI: Mother and Child – RED DATA"; Transliteration: "Shūkō Boshi – Reddo Dēta" (Japanese: 修好母子 RED DATA)	Itsuro Kawasaki	Shōtarō Suga	September 4, 2004	March 26, 2006
Following Ishikawa's intelligence report, Kusanagi heads to Taiwan to investigate a lead on Kuze. She learns that Kuze's presence had a powerful effect on the refugees, and that people believe this has encouraged the formation of a smuggling ring for narcotics and explosives. As she prepares to leave the police station, the detective discloses that her plane will not leave until tomorrow, giving Kusanagi some much-needed free time. While on the street, Kusanagi meets a street kid named Chai with aspirations of make it big in the drug trade. Chai is already in trouble for stealing cocaine from a rival gang called the Xiaojie, and reveals to Kusanagi that he and his friends intend to pressure-mold the drugs into animal figurines for shipment overseas. At the end of the day, Kusanagi heads for her hotel, and Chai spends the night with her, but at dawn Kusanagi discovers he has left. On her way to the airport, Kusanagi discovers a bathhouse key in her pocketbook, and follows it to its source to recover the remaining cocaine from a locker there. Deducing that Chai has gone to the Huanlong yakuza headquarters, Kusanagi storms the building, catching both the Xiaojie and the three yakuza heads off guard. With two separate weapons pointed at the yakuza heads and the Xiaojie, Kusanagi discloses her terms: in exchange for Chai's safety and a promise from the yakuza not to retaliate against the refugees in Taiwan, she will hand over the Xiaojie's stolen cocaine. The yakuza agree to her terms, and force the Xiaojie gang to let Chai and Kusanagi escape from the building unharmed. At the airport, Kusanagi suggests that he create a future for himself rather than getting caught up in a pointless gang war.
44	18	"DI: Angel's Poem – TRANS PARENT"; Transliteration: "Tenshi no Uta – Toranzu Pearento" (Japanese: 天使の詩 TRANS PARENT)	Toshiyuki Kawano	Kenji Kamiyama	September 4, 2004	April 1, 2006
A patient undergoing a routine medical procedure unexpectedly takes a turn for the worse, and the medical staff mount a frantic effort to save him. During the operation it becomes necessary for the doctor in charge of the operation to access the man's external memories, at which point he identifies his patient as the terrorist "Angel's Feathers", one of the world's most wanted men. After struggling over whether to protect doctor-patient confidentiality or inform the police of his discovery, the doctor finally opts to do the latter. The information he gives the police sparks a multi-national counterterrorism operation, with several nations sending members of their best special forces teams, including Batou and Kusanagi. During the briefing in Berlin, they learn that Angel's Feathers uses high-explosive bombs on glass-fronted high rise buildings to kill his targets, and acquired his nickname from the thousands of glass shards that rain down as a result of these explosions. The man in charge of the briefing explains that they have reason to believe Angel's Feathers will stop in Berlin before proceeding to his next target. While staked out on a cold night, Batou oversees a blind girl named Theresia searching for her father, who turns out to be Angel's Feathers; his regular trips to Berlin were to visit her. Batou and Kusanagi infiltrate the church that serves as their meeting place and are forced to apprehend Angel's Feathers in front of Theresia. Note: Much of this episode pays homage to the Wim Wenders film Wings of Desire (originally Der Himmel über Berlin). Also, this episode unexpectedly premiered on Adult Swim an hour earlier than originally scheduled (11:30 p.m. ET), albeit with fart noise audio added in as part of the network's annual April Fools stunt. The episode proceeded to air normally in its usual 12:30 p.m. ET timeslot.
45	19	"IN: Chain Reaction of Symmetry – CHAIN REACTION"; Transliteration: "Sōtai no Rensa – Chēn Reakushon" (Japanese: 相対の連鎖 CHAIN REACTION)	Kazunobu Fuseki	Kenji Kamiyama	October 2, 2004	April 9, 2006
On Dejima island, a crisis is developing. The refugees have declared their independence from Japan in an effort to create an autonomous region they can call their own. The Cabinet Intelligence Agency is exploiting the situation in an effort to fan the flames of separatism, with Goda vowing to give Kuze "his very best script". With Dejima now cordoned off by officers in riot gear, Section 9 decides to launch a surgical strike against the militant refugees, aimed at capturing Kuze. The belief is that if Kuze is captured, the independence movement in Dejima will die down. Upon arriving in Dejima, Section 9 splits into two units, with Kusanagi and Ishikawa diving the net trying to trace Kuze's cyberbrain while the others head into Dejima with a spec ops truck and two Tachikoma units. The ground team learns that Kuze has been in Dejima, and garnered a great following among the refugees, while Kusanagi succeeds in locating Kuze's cyberbrain. Her plan is to hack Kuze's eyes to determine his whereabouts, but she encounters a vicious backlash after coming into contact with Kuze. The experience rattles Kusanagi, but she succeeds in locating Kuze in a camouflaged harbor in Northeastern Dejima. Section 9 reconvenes and prepares to raid the three fishing trawlers anchored there. While checking out one of the trawlers, Kusanagi discovers a cyberbrain filter and deduces immediately that Kuze is not in the harbor, but before she can relay this information a gunfight erupts between armed refugees and Section 9, leading to the death of a new Section 9 recruit named Yano. Batou hounds Kusanagi for the previous mistake before learning from her that Kuze has gone to Russia with the intention of purchasing plutonium from the Russian Mafia.
46	20	"IN: Confusion at the North End – FABRICATE FOG"; Transliteration: "Hokutan no Konmei – Faburikēto Fogu" (Japanese: 北端の混迷 FABRICATE FOG)	Kenichi Takeshita	Kenji Kamiyama	October 2, 2004	April 16, 2006
Section 9 regroups from the firefight, and the body of their dead teammate is airlifted out of Dejima. Desperate for information on where Kuze's plutonium deal would go down, Aramaki pulls some strings and learns that the probable location for such an act would be Etorofu Island. Section 9 is dispatched to the island with the objective of stopping the deal while a request is formally made for a Japanese Maritime Self-Defense Force security net to catch Kuze if he happens to evade capture. On the way to the island, Kusanagi explains that Kuze is very rapidly rising to power, and may eventually become a dictator of sorts if he is not stopped soon; she further explains that the refugees can see and feel what he experiences in real time, which helps him win them over. Upon arriving in Etorofu, Section 9 splits into three units. Batou, Saito, and two Tachikomas head to an abandoned Russian submarine base believed to be the site of the deal, Togusa and Kusanagi go to see a man named Krolden who has helped the latter in the past, and the rest of the team remains with the tiltrotor. Kusanagi discovers that Krolden has been killed by an attack barrier after diving and hacking into something he should not have seen, and when she calls up the records of his dive, she discovers a plan by the Russian mafia to sell plutonium to the refugees for 240 million yen. Kusanagi also uncovers evidence that the Cabinet Intelligence Agency may be pulling the strings behind the deal. Armed with this information, Section 9 sets out to stop the deal. Meanwhile, one of the refugees aboard the boat confronts Kuze over the death of Densetsu, a rapper who served as an inspirational figure to the refugees, at the hands of the Individual Eleven. The man intends to detonate a suicide bomb he has strapped to his body, which will kill Kuze and sink the ship, unless Kuze can explain the purpose for the refugees' trip to Russia. Kuze explains his plan to use the plutonium to build a nuclear weapon that will deter Japan and other foreign powers from invading Dejima. This ultimately wins over the young man, but when Kuze leaves to conduct the plutonium deal, his group of refugees become involved in a three-way firefight with two SDA-issued armoured suits and Section 9's Tachikomas. Batou catches up to Kuze and the episode ends with him holding Kuze at gunpoint.
47	21	"IN: Escape in Defeat – EMBARRASSMENT"; Transliteration: "Haisō – Enbarasumento" (Japanese: 敗走 EMBARRASSMENT)	Masayuki Yoshihara	Kenji Kamiyama	November 6, 2004	April 23, 2006
Batou confronts Kuze in an effort to stop him from leaving with the plutonium, but Kuze disables Batou's right leg and left arm in a fight, putting Batou out of commission so he can escape. When Kusanagi arrives at the scene, she and the Tachikoma assigned to her destroy the other GSDA combat suit and manage to locate Batou, who informs them that Kuze has gotten away. Kusanagi and her Tachikoma race after Kuze, and in the process meet up with Saito and his Tachikoma. Together, they head to the harbor in an attempt to stop the fishing trawler from leaving, but the refugees provide cover fire for Kuze and manage to keep Section 9 at bay long enough for the trawler to escape from the harbor and make it out to sea. Section 9 regroups at the top of the hidden sub base to wait for the tiltrotor to arrive, but when the aircraft sets down to retrieve the team, the suicide bomber who came with Kuze gains access to the tiltrotor and detonates his bomb, destroying the aircraft, killing two Section 9 operators, and seriously injuring Ishikawa. The loss of the tiltrotor removes any chance of Section 9 pursuing Kuze, so the team shifts its focus to getting medical attention for their wounded comrades. Kusanagi and the remaining Section 9 members attempt to retrieve data on the plutonium purchase by accessing Sagawa's records, only to discover that their records have been deleted. Taking all of this into account, Aramaki and Kusanagi outline a hypothesis that has the Cabinet Intelligence Agency pulling the strings behind the plutonium deal, and further speculate that Kuze may not have acquired the plutonium he wanted from the Russians after all. In the midst of this briefing, Section 9 receives word that the Coast Guard net has spotted Kuze's boat attempting to enter Dejima. The Coast Guard Cutter and the fishing trawler exchange shots, leading to a fire on Kuze's boat, but just when it seems that Kuze will be captured, Nagasaki unexpectedly suffers a massive blackout, allowing Kuze to escape from the trawler with the plutonium. However, when he inspects the case, he discovers that he had been given lead bars instead of plutonium, but hides this revelation from the refugees.
48	22	"DU: Abandoned City – REVERSAL PROCESS"; Transliteration: "Mujingai – Ribāsaru Purosesu" (Japanese: 無人街 REVERSAL PROCESS)	Itsuro Kawasaki	Dai Satō & Kenji Kamiyama	November 6, 2004	April 30, 2006
Someone has discovered a tactical nuclear device in Fukuoka's Kyūshū Telecom Tower, and some 35 million citizens are subsequently evacuated over a five-day period to allow the Ground Self Defense Force to safely defuse and remove the device. It is assumed that the culprits behind the bomb are militant refugees, but Section 9 thinks otherwise, and with the Prime Minister's permission, they enter the hot zone to investigate the bomb firsthand. Borma and Paz are sent to inspect the bomb itself, which appears to be a dirty bomb, but upon closer inspection, Borma deduces the device had elements of an implosion bomb which uses American explosives. The unexpected discovery of American material in the bomb creates confusion among the techs disarming it, as the refugees have always used C-4 explosives in their bombs. While Paz and Borma handle the bomb defusal, Batou takes Goda up to the roof of the radio tower for a discussion. Using Kusanagi's external memory, Batou plays with Goda's mind by calling him second-rate, ordinary, and a copycat in an effort to bruise his ego and obtain information on the Individual Eleven and the refugee situation. The plan works, as Goda provides his insight into the case, revealing information that could only be known to the mastermind of the entire incident in the process. Meanwhile, Kusanagi and Saito commandeer a GSDA disposal truck and, masquerading as the bomb removal team, secure the plutonium from the bomb. Kusanagi plans to transport the plutonium to SPring-8 for analysis, expecting that the techs at the facility can link the plutonium from the nuclear bomb to the plutonium from the CIS-run nuclear power plant in the Uchikon 7 district of New Tokyo's Shinjuku Refugee District. Since Section 9 believes that Kuze did not obtain plutonium in Russia, the revelation that the Cabinet Intelligence Service is behind the bomb will defuse the growing sentiment that the refugees must be expelled from Japan. Elsewhere, Aramaki meets with Prime Minister Kayabuki to urge her not to send in the GSDA, but she feels she has no other choice in the matter; everything discovered so far points to the refugees. At Aramaki's urging, she decides to present his report to the cabinet in an effort to stop the oncoming civil war.
49	23	"IN: The Day the Bridge Falls – MARTIAL LAW"; Transliteration: "Hashi ga Ochiru Hi – Māsharu Rō" (Japanese: 橋が落ちる日 MARTIAL LAW)	Toshiyuki Kawano	Kenji Kamiyama	December 4, 2004	May 7, 2006
Prime Minister Kayabuki meets with her cabinet to discuss the Fukuoka nuclear bomb incident, but the cabinet has already decided to deploy the army to retrieve the remaining plutonium supposedly hidden on Dejima Island. Reluctantly, Kayabuki agrees to the plan, and returns to her office to report the decision to Aramaki. After mulling over the available options, Aramaki suggests that Kayabuki put in a request to the United Nations and ask for the dispatch of their nuclear inspectors to Dejima to collect the plutonium. She agrees, and instructs the Chief Cabinet Secretary to make the announcement in the press room. The unexpected UN involvement catches the man off guard; to protect his own interests, he asks an aide to begin the process to remove Kayabuki from power. The cleverly timed announcement made by Kayabuki ruins the Chief Cabinet Secretary's plan for a military invasion of Dejima, as it will take UN inspectors 48 hours to arrive in Japan. Despite this, the Japanese Ground Self-Defense Army and Japanese Maritime Self-Defense Force are ordered to surround Dejima. Elsewhere, Section 9 has transferred the plutonium from the bomb in Fukuoka to one of their own undercover trucks, and have started moving the material to SPring-8, but while en route to the facility, the team discovers that they have been cut off from the Chief. In the absence of his instructions, Kusanagi assumes command of all Section 9 members, and abruptly changes their plan: Rather than move the plutonium to SPring-8, Section 9 will take it into Dejima and capture Kuze so that they can hand them both over to the UN. The team agrees, and the plan is put into motion, but before infiltrating Dejima, a single Tachikoma containing a sample of the plutonium is dispatched to Ishikawa, who has volunteered to take the sample to SPring-8. Using the SDA mobilization as a cover, Section 9 captures a military transport chopper and head for Dejima to put their plan into action. Meanwhile, the refugees are becoming anxious; the military has blockaded Dejima and the two sides face each other down from opposite sides of the bridge that leads into Dejima. Thanks to a last-second Internet message from Kusanagi, Kuze realizes that the Japanese Army is coming, but before he can do anything about it, the refugees' connection to Kuze's cyberbrain hub is cut off by Goda's communications jamming. Out on the bridge barricade, a trigger-happy refugee sniper breaks with instructions not to fire and kills a GSDA soldier, triggering a gunfight between the barricading refugees and the JGSDF.
50	24	"IN: Aerial Bombing of Dejima – NUCLEAR POWER"; Transliteration: "Dejima, Kūbaku – Nyūkuria Pawā" (Japanese: 出島、空爆 NUCLEAR POWER)	Masaki Tachibana	Kenji Kamiyama	December 4, 2004	May 14, 2006
The Chief Cabinet Secretary formally relieves the Kayabuki of her duties because of her decision to call on the UN to mediate in the Dejima crisis. Along with Aramaki, Proto and Togusa, the PM is moved under guard to an abandoned room of the building. Although Kayabuki and her Section 9 escorts are split up they are not out of the fight; Aramaki produces a small-caliber firearm and Proto, Section 9's bioroid, manages to gain access to the net, where he finds Section 9's Tachikoma units. Through them, Proto gains access to the building blueprints and up-to-date information on Section 9's Dejima operation, as well as the location of Kayabuki. With this information in hand, Togusa and the Chief set out to rescue Kayabuki and put the brakes on the Dejima situation before things get even worse. Elsewhere, Kusanagi and the rest of Section 9 (Batou, Borma, Saito, and Paz) manage to infiltrate Dejima Island in their captured military chopper, but before the team can safely disembark a number of Jigabachi aircraft fire on the helicopter, disabling the rotor. Kusanagi bails from the chopper before it crashes, intending to locate Kuze, while the rest of the team is tasked with presenting the "missing" plutonium to the UN inspection team. Unfortunately, Section 4 has been dispatched to retrieve the missing plutonium as well, and they mistake Section 9 operatives for militant refugees, resulting in a shootout across the streets of Dejima as both sides attempt to secure and present the plutonium. Meanwhile, Kuze leads a small band of refugees armed with Stinger missiles to the docks of Dejima island. The quartet manages to shoot down the E2C Hawkeye responsible for the communications jamming signal over Dejima, and allow the refugees to gain access to his cyberbrain once more. From the refugees Kuze learns of the developing situation: the Army and Navy are attacking the island with airstrikes, missiles, and naval artillery; they have also deployed radiation scrubbers in the air in and around Dejima to prevent any fallout from the nuclear material the refugees have from escaping the area unchecked. For the moment, Dejima Island is safe from invasion because the only land bridge into the facility has been destroyed, but the army has begun to move portable bridge equipment in to rebuild it. As Section 9 races against the clock to stop the fighting, the Tachikomas monitoring the Dejima situation make a disturbing discovery.
51	25	"IN: To the Other Side of Paradise – THIS SIDE OF JUSTICE"; Transliteration: "Rakuen no Mukō e – Jisu Saido obu Jasutisu" (Japanese: 楽園の向こうへ THIS SIDE OF JUSTICE)	Jun Matsumoto	Kenji Kamiyama	January 8, 2005	May 21, 2006
The Tachikoma units, through the use of a satellite, have spotted an American Empire ballistic missile submarine carrying nuclear warheads off the coast of Okinawa. The discovery has the Tachikoma tanks concerned; they cannot hack into the submarine's computerized equipment to determine the vessel's orders, and to make matters worse, the missiles carried by the submarine are designed to go clear into the stratosphere before returning to earth. This revelation means the submarine can hit Dejima Island from its current location and position and that the missile cannot be traced back to the submarine, thereby absolving the American Empire from any blame for a nuclear attack. The Tachikoma tanks believe that the sub is preparing to destroy Dejima by launching a warhead at the island, which will eliminate not only Dejima Island and its refugees but also the Ground Self Defense Army soldiers stationed in Nagasaki and the Maritime Self Defense Force cruisers around the island. Elsewhere, Batou and the rest of Section 9 are heavily pursued by Section 4, dispatched by the JGSDF to retrieve the plutonium allegedly possessed by the militant refugees. Section 9 seems to have the upper hand until Batou and the others are cornered by Section 4 members in an open air plaza. In a bold move, Batou reveals himself to Section 4 and attempts to convince them that they are being set up by a third party. Since Batou's eyes are of the same type that the members of Section 4 have, the team leader and the other members of the Rangers listen to Batou as he explains that a submarine is preparing to nuke Dejima, and Section 4 realizes that if the plutonium is not presented to the GSDA soon they will launch a full scale military invasion of the island, which will provide Goda with the scenario he envisioned for a nuclear suicide attack initiated by the refugees. Wasting no time, both Section 9 and Section 4 head for the bridge with the plutonium. At the bridge site, the GSDA has finally succeeded in erecting a replacement for the section of bridge destroyed earlier. Unaware of the nuclear threat posed by the American submarine, the GSDA prepares to invade Dejima to pacify it ahead of the expected arrival of the UN inspectors. Elsewhere, Kusanagi finally locates Kuze, but both find themselves trapped under rubble following a JMSDF air raid. Trapped in a warehouse, and with missiles and naval gunfire pounding the position, Kuze explains that his revolution is meant to be a sort of mass migration of the refugees' minds into the net, and that his ideals and the ideals of the Individual Eleven virus were enough at odds with each other that he was able to break the virus' hold on him. As the two converse, Batou heads for Kusanagi's position to rescue her from the impending nuclear strike.
52	26	"IN: Return to Patriotism – ENDLESS∞GIG"; Transliteration: "Yūkoku e no Kikan – Endoresu∞Gigu" (Japanese: 憂国への帰還 ENDLESS∞GIG)	Masayuki Yoshihara	Kenji Kamiyama	January 8, 2005	May 28, 2006
The JMSDF lets loose with another round of artillery fire and missile strikes as refugees on Dejima attempt to evacuate the island aboard makeshift rafts and boats. In an attempt to save as many refugee lives as possible, Kusanagi orders the Tachikoma units to secure as much space as they can find on the net to store the refugees' memories and ghosts, but the Tachikoma units disregard these orders. Taking matters into their own hands, the Tachikomas decide to commandeer a satellite and drop it into the path that a missile launched from the American sub would take in order to prevent the missile from hitting its intended target. They succeed in commandeering a satellite, but in their haste to save the team the Tachikomas realize too late that the satellite they have chosen is their own AI satellite. Undeterred, the Tachikomas continue with their plan, saving copies of their memories in the space gathered for the refugees. Elsewhere, Section 9 and Section 4 arrive at the bridge head with the plutonium, and are met by members of the GSDA. As Section 9 and Section 4 explain the situation, the missile slated to destroy Dejima is launched; however it is intercepted by the Tachikomas' satellite before it can reach Dejima. Down at the docks, Batou succeeds in locating both Kusanagi and Kuze, who are evacuated from the island by a GSDA helicopter. Back at the cabinet room, Kayabuki and several security men loyal to her corner Chief Secretary Takakura, who is arrested by Aramaki. Kayabuki then orders fighters from the JASDF to buzz the American Empire submarine, discouraging it from firing a second missile. Following Takakura's arrest, Kayabuki and Section 9 turn their attention to Goda, who is planning on defecting to the American Empire. Accompanied by Aramaki and Togusa, a SAT team storms and secures the floor where Goda and his American entourage are located, and Kusanagi assassinates him when he refuses to surrender. However, at the same time, the CIA assassinates Kuze to prevent him from becoming a rallying point for the refugees. Some time later, Section 9 is apparently reorganized into a militarized unit. With the Tachikomas gone, Kusanagi and the others are now reliant on less emotional, slightly more advanced Uchikoma AI tanks. Kusanagi, lost in thought, snaps out of her daydream and realizes her next mission with all her former Section 9 members, courtesy of Togusa. Batou then leads her team off in their new roller tanks to their next job, and Kusanagi leaves once they have gone, taking her own path.

=== Tachikomatic Days ===
Tachikomatic Days are a series of comedic shorts attached to the end of every episode of Ghost in the Shell: Stand Alone Complex featuring the Tachikoma think tanks of Section 9.

== See also ==
- Ghost in the Shell: Stand Alone Complex - Solid State Society
