= Music of Ghost in the Shell: Stand Alone Complex =

The music for the anime series Ghost in the Shell: Stand Alone Complex was primarily composed by Yoko Kanno and produced by Victor Entertainment. Soundtracks were also produced for the two OVA films, The Laughing Man and Individual Eleven, and the TV film Solid State Society.

== Concept and creation ==
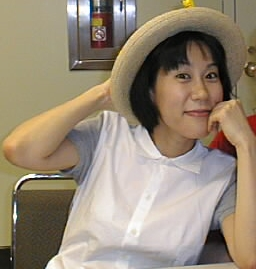
Yoko Kanno, composer of the music for the Stand Alone Complex series

When creating the music of Ghost in the Shell: Stand Alone Complex, Yoko Kanno wanted to create music that would contrast from the formal and "manly" world that appeared in the original manga. In order to do so, Kanno implemented themes of being human and "tangible fuzziness" into the music. Sound Director, Kazuhiro Wakabayashi, provided menus for Kanno to follow in which she described as "delicate emotional feelings [sic] that were like poems."

== Theme songs ==
Yoko Kanno composed the music for all of the opening and closing themes for Ghost in the Shell: Stand Alone Complex, its second season, film sequel and OVAs. When creating the theme song "Inner Universe", Kanno used the image of digital bits and composed the score consisting of recurrent quick beats.

=== Ghost in the Shell: Stand Alone Complex ===
The opening theme for Stand Alone Complex is "Inner Universe", performed by Origa, with lyrics written by Origa and Shanti Snyder in Russian, English and Latin. The closing theme for Stand Alone Complex is "Lithium Flower", performed by Scott Matthew, with lyrics by Tim Jensen.

When terrestrial television later re-broadcast the series, "Inner Universe" was replaced with "GET9" (performed by jillmax and written by Tim Jensen), while "Lithium Flower" was replaced with "I Do" (written and performed by Ilaria Graziano).

=== Ghost in the Shell: S.A.C. 2nd GIG ===
The opening theme for Ghost in the Shell: S.A.C. 2nd GIG is "Rise", performed by Origa, with lyrics written by Origa and Tim Jensen. The closing theme is "Living Inside the Shell", performed by Steve Conte and written by Shanti Snyder.

2nd GIG also used alternate themes for its opening and closing credits when it was re-broadcast on terrestrial television. "Rise" was replaced with "CHRisTmas in the SiLenT ForeSt" (performed by Ilaria Graziano and written by Shanti Snyder), while "Living Inside the Shell" was replaced with "Somewhere in the Silence (Sniper's Theme)" (performed by Ilaria Graziano and written by Tim Jensen).

== Albums ==
=== Ghost in the Shell: Stand Alone Complex O.S.T. ===
Ghost in the Shell: Stand Alone Complex O.S.T.

Soundtrack album by Yoko Kanno
- Released: January 22, 2003; February 25, 2004 ("+" version); March 30, 2011 (re-issue)
- Length: 70:01 − Original Version; 72:48 − "+" Version
- Labels: Victor Entertainment; Bandai Entertainment
- Producer: Yoko Kanno

Ghost in the Shell: Stand Alone Complex O.S.T. (攻殻機動隊 STAND ALONE COMPLEX O.S.T., Kōkaku Kidōtai Sutando Arōn Konpurekkusu Ō Esu Tī) is the first original soundtrack to the anime series Ghost in the Shell: Stand Alone Complex, composed by Yoko Kanno and co-produced by Toshiaki Ota. It features music composed for the first season of the series, and is produced by composer Kanno, Victor Entertainment and Bandai. A later release of the album, entitled Ghost in the Shell: Stand Alone Complex O.S.T.+ (攻殻機動隊 STAND ALONE COMPLEX O.S.T.+, Kōkaku Kidōtai Sutando Arōn Konpurekkusu Ō Esu Tī Purasu), contains TV edits of the themes "GET9" from the terrestrial broadcasts of S.A.C. and "rise" from 2nd GIG. Early copies of O.S.T.+, were incorrectly mastered and tracks on the CD differed from the track listing.

Track listing
| No. | Title | Lyrics | Vocals | Length |
|---|---|---|---|---|
| 1. | "Run Rabbit Junk" | Tim Jensen | HIDE Hideyuki Takahashi (高橋秀幸) | 4:32 |
| 2. | "Yakitori" (ヤキトリ) | | | 7:10 |
| 3. | "Stamina Rose" (スタミナ・ローズ, Sutamina Rōzu) | Gabriela Robin | Gabriela Robin | 2:52 |
| 4. | "Surf" | | | 3:00 |
| 5. | "Where Does This Ocean Go?" | troy | Ilaria Graziano | 4:45 |
| 6. | "Train Search" | | | 1:58 |
| 7. | "Siberian Doll House" (シベリアン・ドール・ハウス, Shiberian Dōru Hausu) | Gabriela Robin | Gabriela Robin | 3:50 |
| 8. | "Velveteen" | troy | Ilaria Graziano | 5:06 |
| 9. | "Lithium Flower" (closing theme) | Tim Jensen | Scott Matthew | 3:25 |
| 10. | "Home Stay" | | | 3:57 |
| 11. | "Inner Universe" (opening theme) | Origa, Shanti Snyder | Origa | 4:55 |
| 12. | "Fish ~ Silent Cruise" | | Ben Del Maestro | 7:30 |
| 13. | "Some Other Time" | Gabriela Robin | Gabriela Robin | 4:07 |
| 14. | "Beauty Is Within Us" | Chris Mosdell | Scott Matthew | 6:08 |
| 15. | "We're the Great" | | | 1:34 |
| 16. | "Monochrome" (モノクローム, Monokurōmu) | troy | Ilaria Graziano | 5:06 |

+ bonus tracks
| No. | Title | Lyrics | Vocals | Length |
|---|---|---|---|---|
| 17. | "GET9 [TV Size]" | Tim Jensen | Jillmax | 1:17 |
| 18. | "Rise [TV Size]" | Origa, Tim Jensen | Origa | 1:31 |

=== Ghost in the Shell: Stand Alone Complex "be Human" ===
Ghost in the Shell: Stand Alone Complex "be Human"

Soundtrack album by Yoko Kanno
- Released: October 22, 2003; March 30, 2011 (re-issue)
- Length: 43:57
- Labels: Victor Entertainment; Bandai Entertainment
- Producer: Yoko Kanno

Ghost in the Shell: Stand Alone Complex "be Human" (攻殻機動隊 STAND ALONE COMPLEX「be human」, Kōkaku Kidōtai Sutando Arōn Konpurekkusu "Bī Hyūman") is an album featuring music from the anime series Ghost in the Shell: Stand Alone Complex, composed by Yoko Kanno. The featured music primarily relates to Tachikomas, the "think tank" combat robots from the series; music from the omake miniseries Tachikomatic Days is also included. The albums features vocals from Scott Matthew, Gabriela Robin, Maaya Sakamoto, HIDE, SUNNY and Sakiko Tamagawa and was produced by composer Kanno, Victor Entertainment and Bandai. The sleeve insert includes punch-out sections which combine to create a paper Tachikoma.

Track listing
| No. | Title | Lyrics | Vocals | Length |
|---|---|---|---|---|
| 1. | "Be Human" | troy | Scott Matthew | 4:05 |
| 2. | "Trip City" | Tim Jensen | Scott Matthew | 3:55 |
| 3. | "Patch Me" | | | 1:33 |
| 4. | "Runaway Tachikoma" (タチコマの家出, Tachikoma no Iede) | | | 1:55 |
| 5. | "Tachikoma out for a Walk" (お散歩タチコマ, Osanpo Tachikoma) | | Gabriela Robin | 2:04 |
| 6. | "Bang Bang Banquet" | | | 2:00 |
| 7. | "FAX Me" | | | 1:27 |
| 8. | "Where's Rocky?" (ロッキーはどこ？, Rokkī wa Doko?) | | | 4:26 |
| 9. | "Spotter" | | | 5:56 |
| 10. | "Let's Oil" | | | 0:45 |
| 11. | "Cream" | HIDE | HIDE & Maaya Sakamoto | 3:55 |
| 12. | "Spider Bites" | | | 0:44 |
| 13. | "Good by My Master" | | | 2:09 |
| 14. | "Piece by Ten" | | | 2:50 |
| 15. | "What Can I Say?" | Tim Jensen | SUNNY | 1:12 |
| 16. | "Hi!" | | | 0:06 |
| 17. | "I'm Not Straight" | | | 1:24 |
| 18. | "AI Combat Team Tachikoma" (AI戦隊タチコマンズ, Ē Ai Sentai Tachikomanzu) | Yoshiki Sakurai | Sakiko Tamagawa | 1:06 |
| 19. | "Pro Bowler Tachikoma" (プロボウラータチコマ, Purobōrā Tachikoma) | | | 0:39 |
| 20. | "Don't Sponge Me" | | | 0:36 |
| 21. | "PO'd Pod" | | | 1:03 |
| 22. | "Ciao!" | | | 0:07 |

=== "GET9" ===
"GET9"

Single by Yoko Kanno
- Released: January 21, 2004
- Label: Victor Entertainment; Bandai Entertainment
- Producer: Yoko Kanno

"GET9" is a single taken from the soundtrack to the anime series Ghost in the Shell: Stand Alone Complex, composed by Yoko Kanno. "GET9" was used as the opening theme for the terrestrial broadcast version of the first season of Stand Alone Complex. "Rise", also featured on this single, was used as the opening theme for the satellite broadcast version of the second season, Ghost in the Shell: S.A.C. 2nd GIG. It was produced by composer Kanno, Victor Entertainment and Bandai.

Track listing
| No. | Title | Lyrics | Vocals | Length |
|---|---|---|---|---|
| 1. | "GET9" | Tim Jensen | Jillmax | 4:44 |
| 2. | "Rise" | Origa, Tim Jensen | Origa | 5:30 |
| 3. | "Icy Mice (Chairman Tadokoro's Secret Party)" (icy mice (田所会長のひみつパーティ), Aishī Maisu (Tadakoro Kaichō no Himitsu Pāti)) | | Gabriela Robin | 3:53 |
| 4. | "GET9 (Naked)" | Tim Jensen | Jillmax | 4:42 |

=== Ghost in the Shell: Stand Alone Complex O.S.T. 2 ===
Ghost in the Shell: Stand Alone Complex O.S.T. 2

Soundtrack album by Yoko Kanno
- Released: May 26, 2004; March 30, 2011 (re-issue)
- Labels: Victor Entertainment; Bandai Entertainment
- Producer: Yoko Kanno

Ghost in the Shell: Stand Alone Complex O.S.T. 2 (攻殻機動隊 STAND ALONE COMPLEX O.S.T. 2, Kōkaku Kidōtai Sutando Arōn Konpurekkusu Ō Esu Tī Tsū) is the second original soundtrack to the anime series Ghost in the Shell: Stand Alone Complex, composed by Yoko Kanno. It primarily features music from the series' second season, Ghost in the Shell: S.A.C. 2nd GIG, in addition to several songs from the first season. The soundtrack was produced by composer Kanno, Victor Entertainment and Bandai.

Track listing
| No. | Title | Lyrics | Vocals | Length |
|---|---|---|---|---|
| 1. | "Cyberbird" (サイバーバード, Saibābādo) | Gabriela Robin | Gabriela Robin | 6:00 |
| 2. | "Rise" | Tim Jensen | Origa | 5:29 |
| 3. | "Ride on Technology" | | | 4:42 |
| 4. | "Idling" (アイドリング, Aidoringu) | | | 2:48 |
| 5. | "I Can't Be Cool" | Ilaria Graziano | Ilaria Graziano | 4:32 |
| 6. | "3tops" | | | 3:59 |
| 7. | "Gonna Rice" | | | 2:04 |
| 8. | "GET9" | Tim Jensen | Jillmax | 4:44 |
| 9. | "Go DA DA" | | | 1:53 |
| 10. | "Psychedelic Soul" (サイケデリックソウル, Saikederikku Sōru) | Tim Jensen | Scott Matthew | 4:48 |
| 11. | "What's it For" | Tim Jensen | Emily Curtis | 3:18 |
| 12. | "Living Inside the Shell" | Shanti Snyder | Steve Conte & Shanti Snyder | 6:24 |
| 13. | "Pet Food" (ペットフード, Petto Fūdo) | | | 1:30 |
| 14. | "Security Off" | | | 1:14 |
| 15. | "To Tell the Truth" | | | 4:52 |
| 16. | "I Do" | Ilaria Graziano | Ilaria Graziano | 4:52 |
| 17. | "We Can't Be Cool" | | | 1:34 |

=== Ghost in the Shell: Stand Alone Complex O.S.T. 3 ===
Ghost in the Shell: Stand Alone Complex O.S.T. 3

Soundtrack album by Yoko Kanno
- Released: July 21, 2005; March 30, 2011 (re-issue)
- Labels: Victor Entertainment; Bandai Entertainment
- Producer: Yoko Kanno

Ghost in the Shell: Stand Alone Complex O.S.T. 3 (攻殻機動隊 STAND ALONE COMPLEX O.S.T. 3, Kōkaku Kidōtai Sutando Arōn Konpurekkusu Ō Esu Tī Surī) is the third original soundtrack to the anime series Ghost in the Shell: Stand Alone Complex, composed by Yoko Kanno. As with O.S.T. 2, it primarily features music from the series' second season, Ghost in the Shell: S.A.C. 2nd GIG, in addition to several songs from the first season. The soundtrack was produced by composer Kanno, Victor Entertainment and Bandai.

All music is composed by Yoko Kanno.

Track listing
| No. | Title | Lyrics | Music | Vocals | Length |
|---|---|---|---|---|---|
| 1. | "The End of All You'll Know" | Chris Mosdell | | Scott Matthew | 2:19 |
| 2. | "Torukia" (トルキア) | Gabriela Robin | Yoko Kanno | Gabriela Robin | 6:06 |
| 3. | "Know Your Enemy" | | | | 6:23 |
| 4. | "Laser Seeker" (レーザーシーカー, Rēzā Shīkā) | | | | 3:13 |
| 5. | "Break Through" | | | | 2:34 |
| 6. | "Flying Low" | | | | 4:35 |
| 7. | "Europe" (エウロペ) | | | | 4:29 |
| 8. | "East of the Peninsula" (半島の東, Hantō no Higashi) | | | | 4:05 |
| 9. | "Incomplete Love Story" (未完成ラブストーリー, Mikansei Rabu Sutōrī) | | | | 1:52 |
| 10. | "CHRisTmas in the SiLenT ForeSt" | Shanti Snyder | | Ilaria Graziano | 6:54 |
| 11. | "Access All Areas" | | | | 1:34 |
| 12. | "Sacred Terrorist" | | | | 4:03 |
| 13. | "Dear John" | Tim Jensen | | Scott Matthew | 4:59 |
| 14. | "35.7°C" | | | | 1:45 |
| 15. | "Smile" (スマイル, Sumairu) | | | | 4:10 |
| 16. | "Flashback Memory Plug" | Gabriela Robin, Shanti Snyder & Origa | | Origa & Ben Del Maestro | 1:08 |
| 17. | "Dew" | Ilaria Graziano | | Ilaria Graziano | 5:50 |

=== Ghost in the Shell: Stand Alone Complex – Solid State Society O.S.T. ===
Ghost in the Shell: Stand Alone Complex – Solid State Society O.S.T.

Soundtrack album by Yoko Kanno
- Released: November 22, 2006; March 30, 2011 (re-issue)
- Labels: Victor Entertainment; Bandai Entertainment
- Producer: Yoko Kanno

Ghost in the Shell: Stand Alone Complex – Solid State Society O.S.T. (攻殻機動隊 STAND ALONE COMPLEX Solid State Society O.S.T., Kōkaku Kidōtai Sutando Arōn Konpurekkusu Soriddo Sutēto Sosaieti Ō Esu Tī) is the original soundtrack to the made-for-TV anime film Ghost in the Shell: Stand Alone Complex – Solid State Society, composed by Yoko Kanno. It features music composed specifically for the film, in addition to music from the first and second series of Ghost in the Shell: Stand Alone Complex. The soundtrack was produced by composer Kanno, Victor Entertainment and Bandai.

Track listing
| No. | Title | Lyrics | Vocals | Length |
|---|---|---|---|---|
| 1. | "Player" | Origa | Origa with Heartsdales | 5:40 |
| 2. | "Replica" | Gabriela Robin | Ilaria Graziano | 5:21 |
| 3. | "Zero Signal" | | Gabriela Robin | 4:03 |
| 4. | "Solid State Society" | | | 4:38 |
| 5. | "Tempest" | | | 2:51 |
| 6. | "Born Stubborn" | | | 3:24 |
| 7. | "She Is" | Gabriela Robin | Gabriela Robin | 2:33 |
| 8. | "From the Roof Top ~ Somewhere in the Silence (Sniper's Theme)" | Tim Jensen | Ilaria Graziano | 6:32 |
| 9. | "Undivided" | | | 2:01 |
| 10. | "Blues in the Net" | | | 6:40 |
| 11. | "Human Step ~ Aramaki's Theme" | | | 3:30 |
| 12. | "Date of Rebirth" | Origa | Origa | 4:39 |
| 13. | "Take a Little Hand" | Gabriela Robin | Gabriela Robin | 5:03 |
| 14. | "Remedium" | | | 3:11 |

=== Ghost in the Shell: Stand Alone Complex CD-Box ===
Ghost in the Shell: Stand Alone Complex CD-Box
- The exterior of the boxset

Soundtrack album by Yoko Kanno
- Released: September 5, 2007
- Length: 5:55:52
- Labels: Victor Entertainment; Bandai
- Producer: Yoko Kanno

Ghost in the Shell: Stand Alone Complex chronology
| Ghost in the Shell: Stand Alone Complex – Solid State Society O.S.T. (2006) | Ghost in the Shell: Stand Alone Complex CD-Box (2007) |

Additional cover

Ghost in the Shell: Stand Alone Complex O.S.T. 4- (攻殻機動隊 STAND ALONE COMPLEX O.S.T. 4- (マイナス), Kōkaku Kidōtai Sutando Arōn Konpurekkusu Ō Esu Tī Fō Mainasu) is the fourth original soundtrack to the anime series Ghost in the Shell: Stand Alone Complex, composed by Yoko Kanno. It features music from both seasons of the series as well as the film Solid State Society and is produced by composer Kanno, Toshiaki Ota, Victor Entertainment, and Bandai.

The album was released exclusively as a part of the Ghost in the Shell: Stand Alone Complex CD-Box box set, which also included all of the above albums and a Tachikoma-style USB memory stick featuring previously unreleased music from Tachikomatic Days, as well as voice clips, images, and video. Stand Alone Complex O.S.T. 4- is presented as a continuous, single-track mix and consists of "16 pieces".

Ghost in the Shell: Stand Alone Complex O.S.T. 4-
| No. | Title | Length |
|---|---|---|
| 1. | "Smooth in the Shell [No Break Disk]" | 49:02 |

Tachikoma USB
| No. | Title | Length |
|---|---|---|
| 1. | "Tenohirawotaiyouni" | 1:35 |
| 2. | "Kuro Tachikoma" | 2:06 |
| 3. | "Omake 1" | 0:46 |
| 4. | "Omake 2" | 0:49 |
| 5. | "Omake 3" | 0:45 |
| 6. | "Omake 4" | 0:42 |
| 7. | "Omake 5" | 0:35 |
| 8. | "Omake 6" | 0:47 |
| 9. | "Omake 7" | 0:46 |
| 10. | "Omake 8A" | 0:21 |
| 11. | "Omake 8B" | 0:37 |
| 12. | "Omake 8C" | 0:28 |
| 13. | "Omake 8D" | 0:30 |
| 14. | "Open Tachikoma" | 0:06 |
| 15. | "Tachikoma SP1" | 1:29 |
| 16. | "Tachikoma SP2" | 1:14 |
| 17. | "Tachikoma SP3" | 0:10 |
| 18. | "Tachikoma na Hibi" | 0:16 |
