= Bicci =

Bicci may refer to:

- Bicci di Lorenzo (1373-1452), Italian painter and sculptor, active in Florence
- Giovanni di Bicci de' Medici (c. 1360–1429), Italian banker and founder of the Medici Bank
- Lorenzo di Bicci (c. 1350–1427), Italian painter of the Florentine School
- Neri di Bicci (1419-1491), Italian painter active mainly in Florence
- Yoko Kanno produce Cyber Bicci, a compilation album of Japanese composer Yoko Kanno and Italian vocalist Ilaria Graziano
