= The Fortunate Ones =

The Fortunate Ones may refer to:

- Fortunate Ones, Canadian band
- The Fortunate Ones (Ghost in the Shell), television episode
