= Origa =

Russian singer 1970-2015

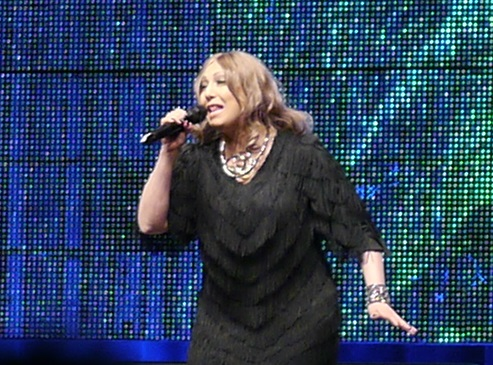
- Origa in 2013

Background information
- Also known as: ORIGA
- Born: Olga Vital'evna Yakovleva; October 12, 1970; Kochenyovo, Novosibirsk Oblast, Soviet Union
- Origin: Sapporo, Hokkaido, Japan
- Died: January 17, 2015 (aged 44) Kanagawa Prefecture, Japan
- Genres: New-age, electronica, anime soundtrack
- Occupations: Singer-songwriter, musician, composer
- Instruments: Vocals, piano
- Years active: 1991–2015
- Labels: ROAD & SKY Company; TOSHIBA EMI Records; GEMMATIKA Records

Olga Vitalevna Yakovleva (Russian: Ольга Витальевна Яковлева, October 12, 1970 – January 17, 2015), better known as Origa, was a Russian singer who rose to prominence for her musical collaborations in Japan, especially her work for Ghost in the Shell: Stand Alone Complex.

== History ==
Origa was born in the small urban village of Kochenyovo, 50 kilometres (31 mi) west of Novosibirsk. After graduating from music school in 1990, she took an opportunity to visit Japan in 1991 and contracted with the ROAD&SKY Organization in 1993. She later participated in several projects with various artists in addition to the Radio Japan Series and being part of the chorus for the Kobe earthquake disaster charity single. She released eight solo albums, three mini-albums, two compilation albums and 3 singles. She gained popularity outside Japan with the release of Ghost in the Shell: Stand Alone Complex and the subsequent original soundtracks, Ghost in the Shell: Stand Alone Complex O.S.T. and Ghost in the Shell: Stand Alone Complex O.S.T. 2.

These were written by long-time friend and composer Yoko Kanno, and both the first season's theme song, Inner Universe (featuring boy soprano Ben Del Maestro) and the second season's theme song, Rise, used Origa's vocals. Origa first performed with Kanno for ∀ Gundam, singing "Moon" in concerts (on the CD "Moon" is performed by Kanno under the pseudonym of Gabriela Robin; Kanno did not perform this song live until a surprise performance in 2009). In 2005, Origa performed songs for the anime series Fantastic Children, most notably the ending theme "Mizu no Madoromi".

In 2006, Origa was involved in the lyrics and vocal performance for the opening song "Player" and the ending theme "date of rebirth" from the movie Ghost in the Shell: Stand Alone Complex – Solid State Society. In 2007, Origa performed with Yoko Kanno for the Ragnarok 2 Concert. There, she performed all three Ghost in the Shell opening themes; "Player" from Solid State Society, "Inner Universe" from the first season, and "Rise" from 2nd GIG, and substituted for Ilaria Graziano on "Yoru_Vo", Pierre Bensusan on "ELM", and Gabriela Robin on "Torukia". She also performed alongside fellow vocalists Maaya Sakamoto and Mai Yamane and joined in singing selected songs originally performed only by Maaya.

On December 19, 2008, she performed at Sugizo's "Rise to Cosmic Dance" concert held at Tokyo's Shibuya-AX hall. She later appeared on his 2011 single "The Edge".

She lent her voice to the soundtrack for the video game Final Fantasy XIII-2. The game was released in Japan on December 15, 2011. The soundtrack was composed by Masashi Hamauzu, Naoshi Mizuta and Mitsuto Suzuki.

Beginning in 2013, she worked alongside musician Seiya and the duo have performed together worldwide. In 2014, Origa attended Anirevo (Anime Revolution) where she performed in concert. She performed songs from the Ghost in the Shell series and a medley of many other theme songs, including the debut of what would later become her last song, "Bells". She also participated in a panel with Production I.G CEO Mitsuhisa Ishikawa.

== Death ==
Origa died of heart failure on Saturday January 17, 2015, at 8:20 a.m. following eight days of hospitalization in the Kanagawa Prefecture.

Although the announcement on her official website says she died of heart failure, a tweet by anime voice actress Jenya says she died of lung cancer, while another source adds she had already been fighting with lung cancer for two years.

== Discography ==
=== Solo career ===
Demos:

- Olga (1991)

Studio albums:

- Origa (1994)
- Illusia (1995)
- Lira Vetrov (1996)
- Eternity (1998)
- Era of Queens (2003)
- Aurora (2005)
- The Songwreath (2008)
- Amon Ra (2013)
- Lost and Found (2015)

Singles:

- "Kaze no Naka no Soritea" (1995)
- "Le Vent Vert—Le Temps Bleu" (Полюшко Поле) (1998)
- "Electra's Song" (2003)
- "Mizu no Madoromi" (2004)
- "Leleyala" (2006)
- "Land of Love" (2006)
- "Spiral" (2006)
- "Hanagumori" (2007)
- "My Way" (2016)

Mini albums:

- Crystal Winter (1994)
- Aria (1996)
- The Annulet (2013)

Compilation albums:

- The Best of Origa (1999)
- All About Origa (2015)

=== Featured discography ===
- Yang Bang-ean (Kunihiko Ryo) – The Gate of Dreams (1997) – Background vocals for "Triumph of the Soul Behemian"
- Ao no Jidai: Original TV Soundtrack (1998) – Vocals and lyrics for "Le Vent Vert ~ Le Temps Bleu (Poljushko Pole)"
- Yoko Kanno – ∀ Gundam: The Concert (2000) – Vocals for "Moon"
- Akira Senju – Princess Arete: Original Movie Soundtrack (2001) – Vocals and lyrics for "Krasno Solntse", and "Majo no Yubiwa",
- Yoko Kanno – Ghost in the Shell: Stand Alone Complex O.S.T. (2003) – Vocals and lyrics for "Inner Universe"
- Yoko Kanno – Ghost in the Shell: Stand Alone Complex O.S.T. 2 (2004) – Vocals and lyrics for "Rise"
- Kouji Ueno – Fantastic Children: Original TV Soundtrack 1 (2005) – Vocals and lyrics for "Pobezhdaet Ljubovj"
- Kouji Ueno – Fantastic Children: Drama & Image album (2005) – Vocals and lyrics for "Fuyuu Yume" (both Japanese and Russian versions)
- Yoko Kanno – Ghost in the Shell: Stand Alone Complex – Solid State Society O.S.T. (2006) – Vocals and lyrics for "Player", and "Date of Rebirth"
- Yoko Kanno – CM Yoko (2007) – Vocals for "Exaelitus"
- Kunihiko Ryo – Aion: The Tower of Eternity Original Soundtrack (2008) – Vocals on "The Wings of Knight", "Song of Moonlight", and "Voice from the Ruins"
- Allods Online – Allods Online Soundtrack (2010) – Background vocals for "Heart of the World" and "Oak Tears"
- Sugizo – Flower of Life (2011) – Background Vocals for "Enola Gay", "Arc Moon", "The Edge", "Tell Me Why You Hide the Truth?", and "Conscientia"
- Himekami, Mitsuto Suzuki, DAISHI DANCE, Language, Takashi Watanabe – Starry Tales Soundtrack (2011) – Vocals for "Starry Tales", "Wings for Freedom", "Astraea", and "Shining Future"
- Masashi Hamauzu, Naoshi Mizuta, and Mitsuto Suzuki – Final Fantasy XIII-2: Original Soundtrack (2011) – Vocals on "New Bodhum", "Historia Crux", "Missing Link", "Parallel World", and "Space-Time Interval"
- Himekami – Voyage to Another World ~ Himekami TV Onmibus ~ (2013) – vocals on "Voyage to Another World", "An Eternal Flower", "Miracle Presents From Nature", and "Ice Blue Calmy Flow"
- Yang Bang-ean (Kunihiko Ryo) – Yang Bang Ean – Piano Fantasy (2013) – Vocals for "Rainbow Leaves", "St. Medieval Rain", "Timeless Story (Origa Ver.)", and "Forgotten Sorrow (Origa Ver.)"
- Akira Tsuchiya, Akiko Shikata, Daisuke Achiwa, Kazuki Yanagawa, Eiichiro Yanagi – Ar Nosurge: Genometric Concert Side Blue Dancer of Time ~Tokikagura~ (2014) – vocals on "Empyein Varifen Jang" and "Yal Fiine Nohiar"
- XES – Black Tears EP (2014) – Vocals for "Black Tears"
- Herowarz: Herowarz Original Soundtrack (2014) – Vocals on "Audrey Theme Song"
- Yang Bang-ean (Kunihiko Ryo) – Embrace (2016) – Background vocals on "Voice from Aurora ~ I Can Hear It Even Now"
