= Yoko Kanno produce Cyber Bicci =

Album by Ilaria Graziano

Yoko Kanno Produce Cyber Bicci

Studio album by ILA with Yoko Kanno
- Released: June 8, 2011
- Genre: Avant-pop; new age
- Label: Victor Entertainment
- Producer: Yoko Kanno

Yoko Kanno produce Cyber Bicci is a compilation album of Japanese composer Yoko Kanno and Italian vocalist Ilaria Graziano under her stage name ILA. The album includes their collaborated works for anime soundtracks, along with two new tracks.

== Track listing ==
All music is composed by Yoko Kanno

CD (VTCL-60270)
No.	Title	Lyrics	Length
1.	"Velveteen" (Ghost in the Shell: Stand Alone Complex)	troy	5:07
2.	"Monochrome" (Ghost in the Shell: Stand Alone Complex)	troy	5:03
3.	"Valse De La Lune" (Wolf's Rain)	Ilaria Graziano	3:02
4.	"Einstein Groovin'" (From the album Cowboy Bebop Tank! THE! BEST!)	Ilaria Graziano	6:18
5.	"Diamonds" (From the album Cowboy Bebop Tank! THE! BEST!)	Tim Jensen	4:03
6.	"Dew" (Ghost in the Shell: Stand Alone Complex)	Ilaria Graziano	5:12
7.	"I can't be cool" (Ghost in the Shell: Stand Alone Complex)	Ilaria Graziano	4:38
8.	"Flying to You" (Wolf's Rain)	Ilaria Graziano	2:23
9.	"CHRisTmas in the SiLenT ForeSt" (Ghost in the Shell: Stand Alone Complex)	Shanti Snyder	6:10
10.	"I do" (Ghost in the Shell: Stand Alone Complex)	Ilaria Graziano	4:54
11.	"Un Soffio Di Vento" (A Wind Blow)	Ilaria Graziano	3:01
12.	"RR Lyrae"	Ilaria Graziano	6:27
13.	"Pearls" (From the album Cowboy Bebop Tank! THE! BEST!)	Ilaria Graziano	4:43
Total length:			1:00:54

== Charts ==
Chart	Peak position
Oricon Weekly Albums	35
