= Ilaria Graziano =

Italian singer

- Also known as: ILA
- Born: Naples, Italy
- Genres: Avant-pop; new age; electronica
- Occupation: Singer

Ilaria Graziano (also known as ILA or Nanà; born in Naples, Italy) is an Italian singer. She gained popularity with the release of Ghost in the Shell: Stand Alone Complex and the subsequent original soundtracks, composed by Yoko Kanno.

Graziano started playing violin and singing at a very young age. In 1997, she joined the European female pop group Salsaruba. She has since participated in several projects by various artists in Italy, including the album FLUX with DJ Miele (Stefano Miele) in 2002.

After her studies at a painting school, she took an opportunity to leave Italy for London.

A few months later, she performed the vocals for the Wolf's Rain O.S.T. track "Valse de la Lune" with Yoko Kanno. She also appeared on the Ghost in the Shell: Stand Alone Complex O.S.T. 1 ("Where does this Ocean Go?", "Velveteen"), O.S.T. 2 ("I Can't Be Cool", "I Do"), and O.S.T. + ("Monochrome").

Her recent work includes continued collaborations with Kanno, performing songs for the release of Ghost in the Shell: Stand Alone Complex O.S.T. 3 (featuring "Christmas in the Silent Forest", "Dew") and "Ghost in the Shell: Solid State Society" ("Replica", "From The Roof Top ~ Somewhere in the Silence (Sniper's Theme)"). Graziano also performed songs for the soundtrack to the 2005 Cowboy Bebop PlayStation 2 game Cowboy Bebop: Tsuioku no Serenade, which were released on the Seatbelts' album Tank! THE! BEST!.

She is currently working on a solo project in London where she resides.

== Featured discography ==
(see links for complete discography)

- Napple Tale Illustrated Guide to the Monsters / Yoko Kanno (2000 – vocals)
- FLUX / DJ Miele (2002 – vocals)
- Wolf's Rain Original Soundtrack Vol. 1 / Yoko Kanno (2003 – Vocals)
- Ghost in the Shell: Stand Alone Complex O.S.T / Yoko Kanno (2003 – vocals)
- Ghost in the Shell: Stand Alone Complex O.S.T 2 / Yoko Kanno (2004 – vocals)
- Ghost in the Shell: Stand Alone Complex O.S.T + / Yoko Kanno (2004 – vocals)
- Wolf's Rain Original Soundtrack Vol. 2 / Yoko Kanno (2004 – vocals)
- Cowboy Bebop Tank! THE! BEST! / Yoko Kanno (2004 – vocals)
- Ghost in the Shell: Stand Alone Complex O.S.T 3 / Yoko Kanno (2005 – vocals)
- Ashurajou no Hitomi O.S.T. / Yoko Kanno (2005 – vocals)
- Ghost in the Shell: S.A.C. Solid State Society O.S.T / Yoko Kanno (2006 – vocals)
- Yoko Kanno produce Cyber Bicci / Yoko Kanno (2011 – vocals) as ILA
- From Bedlam to Lenane / Ilaria Graziano & Francesco Forni (2012 – vocals)
- Come 2 Me / Ilaria Graziano & Francesco Forni (2013 – vocals)
