= Scott Matthew =

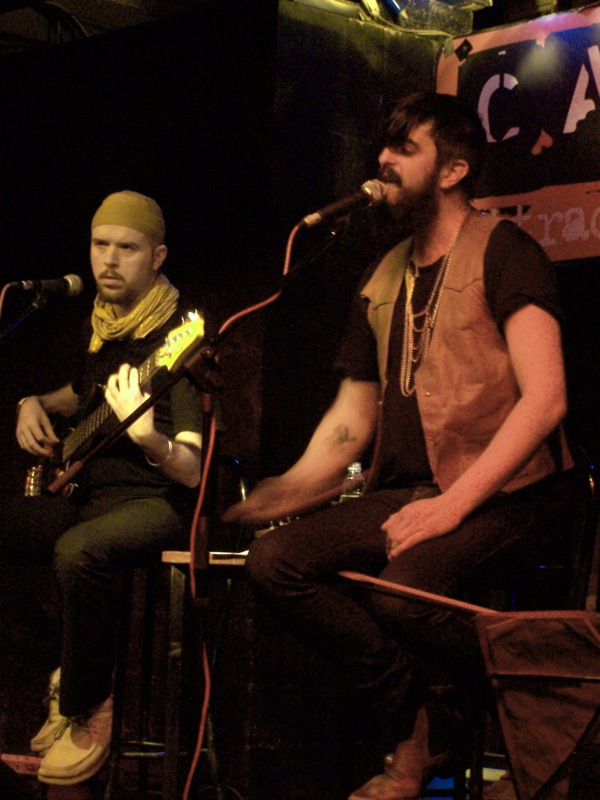
- Scott Matthew (right), Calamita Cavriago, Italy, November 2008

Background information
- Born: Scott William Matthew; Queensland, Australia
- Genres: Alternative pop
- Occupation: Singer-songwriter
- Instruments: Vocals, ukulele, guitar
- Years active: 1995–present
- Labels: Glitterhouse, Groovescooter, Comfort Stand
- Website: scottmatthewmusic.com

Scott William Matthew is a singer-songwriter born in Queensland, Australia. He was a member of alternative pop band Elva Snow (2001–2006), which he co-founded with Spencer Cobrin. On 7 March 2008 he issued his solo debut eponymous album. His second album, There Is an Ocean That Divides, appeared on 24 April 2009. On 10 June 2011, Matthew followed with his third album, Gallantry's Favorite Son. He resides and performs as an independent artist in New York City.

== Biography ==
Scott William Matthew was born in Queensland. He worked in various Brisbane punk rock groups, before relocating to Sydney where he formed Nicotine. He moved to New York City in 1997. Matthew was a member of the alternative pop band Elva Snow (2001–2006), which he co-founded with ex-Morrissey backing band member Spencer Cobrin. Two songs from their self-titled debut album, which had Matthew on vocals and Cobrin on drums, piano, guitar and composition, were included in feature film soundtracks. "Hold Me" was in 2004's The Last Run, directed by Jonathan Segal and starring Fred Savage, and "Could Ya" appeared in the 2005 film Splinter, directed by Kai Maurer.

After the dissolution of Elva Snow, Matthew performed with the band, Songs to Drink and Drive By, under the free-base mp3 label Comfort Stand. The group includes Matthew and Peter Gingerich on vocals with Marisol Limon on electronic organ, Nate Calkins on drums and Pablo Mitas on viola.

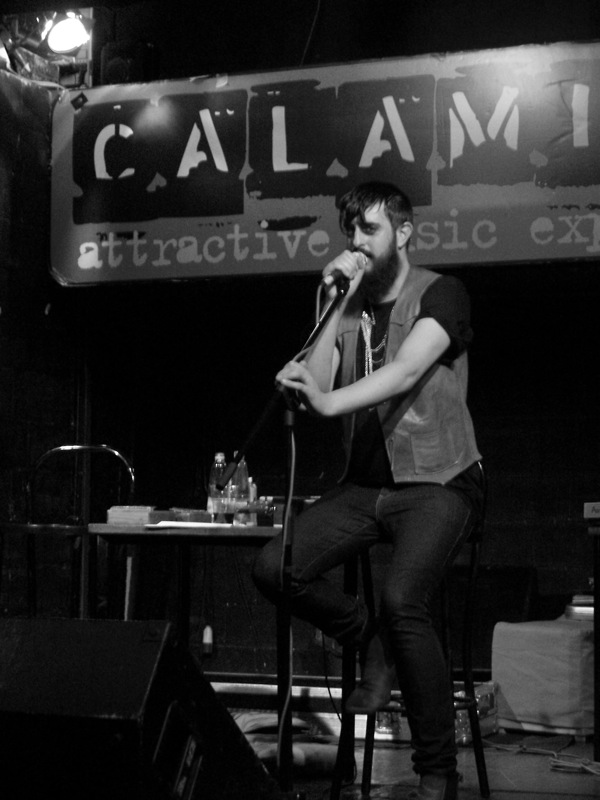
Scott Matthew (2008)

From 2001, Matthew provided vocals on the soundtracks of the anime film Cowboy Bebop: Knockin' on Heaven's Door (2001) and anime series Ghost in the Shell: Stand Alone Complex (2002–03). Both were produced by composer Yoko Kanno. Matthew's performance of the alternative rock song "Lithium Flower" was used as the ending song for season one of Ghost in the Shell: Stand Alone Complex. It generated exposure in Japan as well as the United States when the show was aired on Cartoon Network's Adult Swim block in 2004.

Matthew wrote the lyrics to "Go Where No One's Gone Before", the main theme for the anime series L/R: Licensed by Royalty which was performed by Billy Preston. Matthew also contributed to the original soundtrack of John Cameron Mitchell's dark sexual comedy Shortbus (2006), which includes five of his tracks, "Upside Down", "Surgery", "Language", "Little Bird" and "In the End (Acoustic)".

On 7 March 2008 he issued his debut solo album, Scott Matthew, on Glitterhouse Records. Allmusic's reviewer, Pemberton Roach, described Matthew's "quivering, otherworldly" singing and his "gentle, melancholic" songwriting with the album displaying his "enigmatic voice and tales of existential woe gently supported by a bed of tinkling piano ('Surgery'), softly plucked ukulele ('Little Bird'), vibes ('Amputee'), and muted horns ('In the End')". His second album, There Is an Ocean That Divides, appeared on 24 April 2009. Contactmusic's reviewer found "the minor guitar chords and sad sounding piano, along with Matthew's gloomy vocals set a melancholic tone".

Matthew re-recorded the line "Make it beautiful now" from his song German for the track Beautiful by the German pop group Rosenstolz. Beautiful is the final track on their 2011 album Wir Sind Am Leben. The record entered the German charts at number one.

On 10 June 2011 his third album, Gallantry's Favorite Son, was issued. Franziska Meissner of Farrel Magazine extolled Matthew's release as it "delivers once well-known: Incredibly soft and incredibly haunting melodies simultaneously". Aside from being a singer-songwriter, Matthew also plays the ukulele and guitar.

== Discography ==
=== Albums ===
- 2003 Ghost in the Shell: Stand Alone Complex O.S.T. (Victor Entertainment, 22 January 2003)
- 2008 Scott Matthew (Glitterhouse Records, 7 March 2008, GR 677)
- 2009 There Is an Ocean That Divides and with My Longing I Can Charge It with a Voltage That's So Violent to Cross It Could Mean Death (Glitterhouse Records, 24 April 2009, GR 695)
- 2011 Gallantry's Favorite Son (Glitterhouse Records, 10 June 2011, GR 723)
- 2011 Best of Scott Matthew (digital only, Europe) (Glitterhouse Records, 4 November 2011)
- 2013 Unlearned (Glitterhouse Records, 2013)
- 2015 This Here Defeat (Glitterhouse Records, 2015)
- 2016 Life Is Long with Rodrigo Leão (Glitterhouse Records, Universal Music Portugal, 2016)
- 2018 Ode to Others (Glitterhouse Records, 2018)
- 2020 Adorned (Glitterhouse Records, 2020)
- 2024: A Small Conduit of Great Affairs (Glitterhouse Records, 2024)

=== Extended plays ===
- 2008 Rx's Prescription Cocktail Mixers (featuring Eric D. Clark)
- 2008 Silent Nights
- 2011 To Love Is to Live/To Receive Is to Give (Limited Tour Edition)
- 2019 Silent Nights (feat. Sia)

=== Singles ===
- 2008 "For Dick"
- 2008 "Silent Nights"
- 2013 "I Wanna Dance With Somebody"
