= Shanti Snyder =

Japanese lyricist, singer, songwriter (born 1981)

Shanti
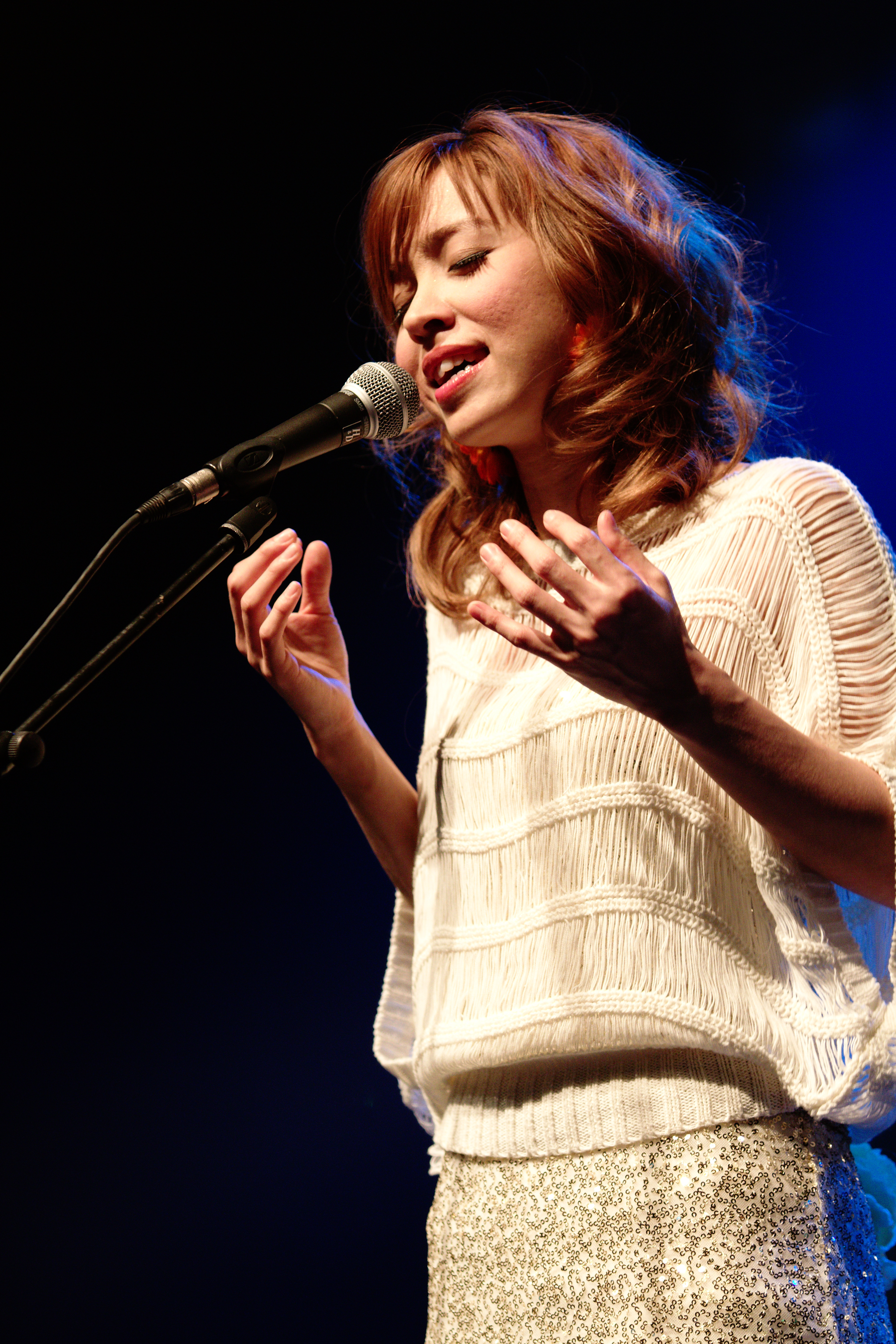
- Shanti Snyder at Japan Expo 2011

Background information
- Also known as: Shanti
- Born: Shanti Snyder; 4 June 1981 (age 45)
- Origin: Kanagawa Prefecture, Japan
- Genres: Nu Jazz
- Occupations: Singer, songwriter, lyricist, tv host
- Years active: 1996–present
- Labels: Hayama, Nippon Columbia
- Website: www.shantisnydermusic.com

Shanti Snyder (born 4 June 1981), better known as Shanti (stylized in all-caps), is a Japanese lyricist, singer, songwriter, and music TV host of mixed descent, based in Japan and hailing from Kanagawa Prefecture. She performs with a few different formations at clubs in the Tokyo area and has also appeared with various other musical artists. Shanti's voice is well known through her collaborations with Yoko Kanno, notably in Escaflowne the Movie, where she was the vocalist on the theme song "Sora".

== Biography ==
Shanti was born to American musician Tommy Snyder, who has been the drummer and vocalist for Godiego since 1977. Shanti is a frequent lyricist and vocalist for commercials, working with many Tokyo based commercial song production companies and advertising agencies, recording songs and narrations for businesses such as Coca-Cola, Tokyo Disney Resort, and Xerox. Shanti Snyder wrote four songs on J-pop singer Crystal Kay's debut album, C.L.L Crystal Lover Light.

She co-wrote the opening theme for Ghost in the Shell: Stand Alone Complex named "Inner Universe" with Origa.

In 2008, the song called "Home" that Shanti co-wrote with Hajime Yoshizawa featured her voice. It received attention in Japan when it was used for a caffe latte advertising campaign featuring Scarlett Johansson. In June 2008, when the song was pre-released on iTunes to promote Hajime Yoshizawa's Japan album, it was number 1 on iTunes for a short time.

Shanti's debut album, Share My Air, was recorded in Paris with some of France's top musicians. The album was released in Japan on the Hayama label.

From October 2008 until March 2010, Shanti was the co-host for J-Melo, an NHK World music program that was broadcast worldwide.

Shanti sang the ending theme song, "Pray for the World", for the film Reunion released in Japan in February 2013."

== Discography ==
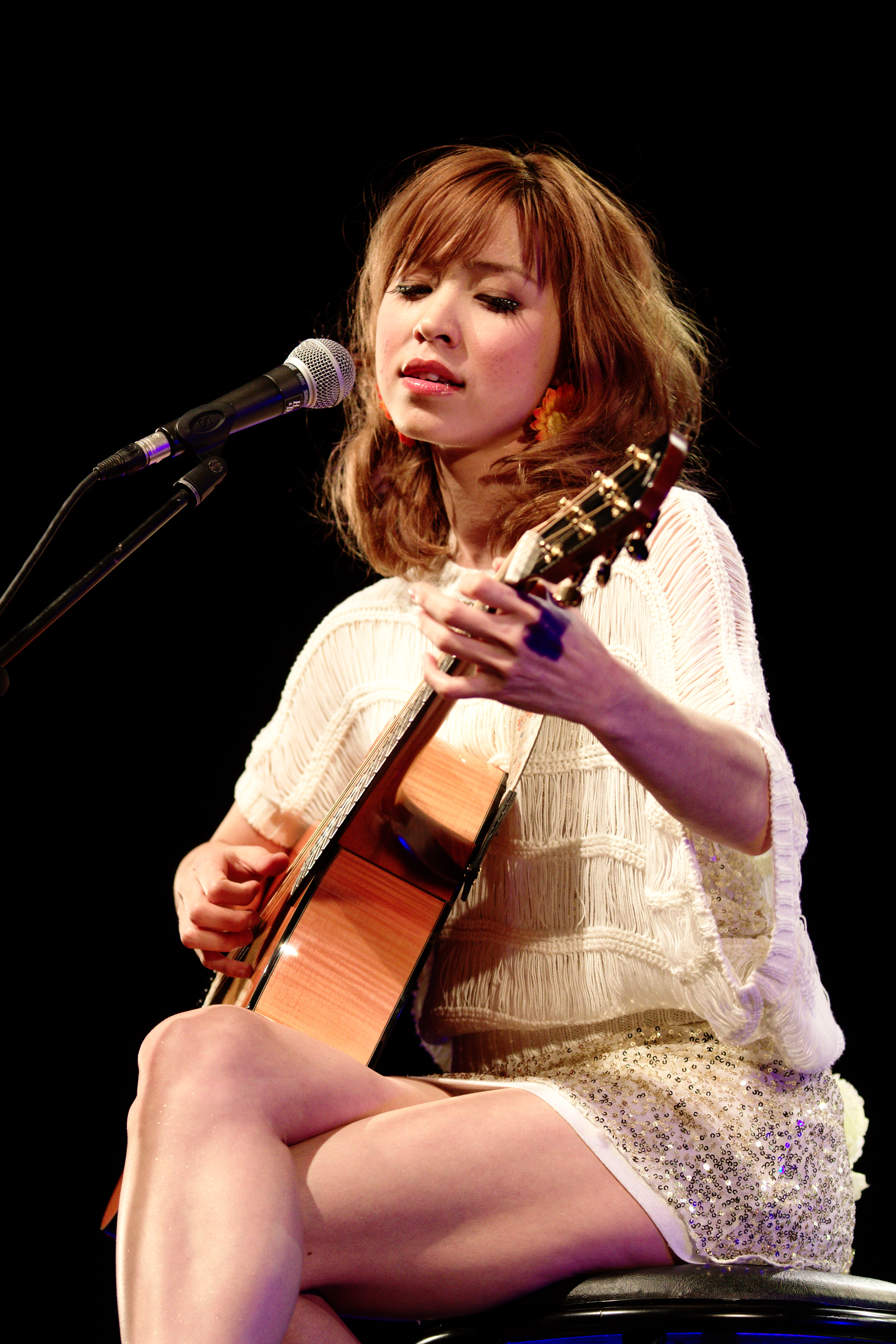
Shanti Snyder at Japan Expo 2011

=== Albums ===
- Share My Air, 18 January 2008
- Born to Sing, 23 June 2010
- Romance with Me, 26 January 2011
- Lotus Flower, 22 February 2012
- Cloud 9, 5 December 2012
- "Jazz en Rose", 6 March 2013

=== Singles ===
- "The Christmas Song", 2010
- "Lovin' You", 2012
