= Single Collection+ Nikopachi =

Compilation album by Maaya Sakamoto
- Released: July 30, 2003
- Studios: Victor Studio; Studio Greenbird; Soundcity; Towerside Studio; Crescent Studio; Soundtrack Studio (NY), Platinum Sound (NY); Forum Music Village (Rome)
- Genres: J-pop; anime song; alternative pop
- Length: 69:12
- Label: Victor Entertainment
- Producer: Yoko Kanno

Maaya Sakamoto chronology
Easy Listening (2001)	Single Collection+ Nikopachi (2003)	Shōnen Alice (2003)

Singles from Single Collection+ Nikopachi
- 1. "Yubiwa" Released: June 21, 2000; 2. "Shippo no Uta" Released: August 23, 2000; 3. "Hemisphere" Released: February 21, 2002; 4. "Gravity" Released: February 21, 2003; 5. "Tune the Rainbow" Released: April 2, 2003

Single Collection+ Nikopachi (Japanese: シングルコレクション＋(プラス) ニコパチ, Hepburn: Shinguru Korekushon Purasu Nikopachi) is the second compilation album by Japanese singer and voice actress Maaya Sakamoto. The album was released on July 30, 2003, by Victor Entertainment.

== Background and release ==
This is Sakamoto's second single collection following Single Collection+ Hotchpotch, and it includes sixteen tracks primarily tied to anime, games, and television dramas released between 2000 and 2003. Sakamoto explained that such tracks, most of them associated with animation tie-ins, although showcasing alternate facets of her artistry, could not be included on albums like Lucy or Easy Listening, as they did not align with the unified visions of such albums. Sakamoto explained that most songs on the album felt like she was acting out a role rather than expressing her own artistic identity, but nevertheless embraced this detachment as part of her persona, expressing gratitude for the wide range of repertoire—from songs with a musical flair and a cutesy touch to English tunes and themes for animations and dramas. However, she also admitted wanting people to listen to the album but not to forget Lucy as well, emphasizing that the two together showed who she was as an artist.

Notable tie-ins included on the album are "Hemisphere", the opening theme for the anime RahXephon (2002); "Tune the Rainbow", the theme song for the theatrical film RahXephon: Pluralitas Concentio (2003); and "Gravity", the ending theme for Wolf's Rain (2003). The song "Bike" used as one of the ending themes for the television anime Earth Maiden Arjuna, while "Shippo no Uta," "Yoake no Octave," and "Midori no Hane" were provided by Sakamoto for the Sega Dreamcast video game Napple Tale: Arsia in Daydream (2000). On the other hand, "Daniel", "Toto", and "Here" were used as insert songs on the NHK drama Mayonaka wa Betsu no Kao (2001). The album also features previously unreleased tracks, such as "Kimidori", used as theme song for the PlayStation 2 game Shirochū Tankenbu (2003) and a newly-arranged version of "Yubiwa", which served as theme song of anime film Escaflowne: The Movie (2000).

The album was released in two formats: a standard CD-only edition, and a 30,000-copy limited first pressing that came with a DVD including the promotional videos for "Hashiru" and "Mameshiba" (songs not included on the CD), along with bonus footage.

== Commercial performance ==
Nikopachi debuted at number 3 on the Oricon Weekly Albums Chart, becoming her highest-charting released as of that date, and selling 41,089 copies on its first week. The album charted for eleven weeks, with reported sales totaling 69,966 copies.

== Track listing ==
All music is composed by Yoko Kanno, except for track 15 credited to Kanno and Alexander Borodin.

Single Collection+ Nikopachi - CD
No.	Title	Lyrics	Length
1.	"Yoake no Octave" (夜明けのオクターブ, lit. 'Dawn Octave')	Hiroshi Ichikura	1:51
2.	"Hemisphere" (ヘミソフィア)	Yuho Iwasato	4:10
3.	"Daniel" (ダニエル)	Troy (Note: Alias of Tim and Mayu Jensen.)	3:50
4.	"Bike" (バイク)	Iwasato	5:10
5.	"Shippo no Uta" (しっぽのうた, lit. 'Tail Song')	Ichikura	2:42
6.	"Yubiwa (23 Carat)" (指輪－23カラット－, lit. 'Ring (23 Carat)')	Iwasato	3:41
7.	"Ongaku" (音楽, lit. 'Music')	Iwasato	4:46
8.	"Midori no Hane" (みどりのはね, lit. 'Green Wings')	Ichikura	2:49
9.	"Shima Shima" (シマシマ, lit. 'Striped')	Maaya Sakamoto	4:47
10.	"Kimidori" (キミドリ, lit. 'You-Green')	Sakamoto	5:02
11.	"Tune the Rainbow"	Iwasato	5:31
12.	"Toto"	Tim Jensen	4:25
13.	"Here"	Jensen	5:06
14.	"Vector" (ベクトル)	Jensen	5:15
15.	"The Garden of Everything (Denki Rocket ni Kimi o Tsurete)" (THE GARDEN OF EVERYTHING ～電気ロケットに君をつれて～, lit. 'The Garden of Everything: Taking You on an Electric Rocket') (feat. Steve Conte)	Chris Mosdell; Sakamoto	6:19
16.	"Gravity"	Troy	3:17
Total length:			69:12

Single Collection+ Nikopachi - limited edition bonus DVD
No.	Title	Director	Length
1.	"Hashiru" (Music Video)	Naoki Imamura
2.	"Mameshiba" (Music Video)	Yasuyuki Yamaguchi
3.	"Making of Nikopachi"
4.	"Staff+Little Bonus Video"

== Personnel ==
Credits adapted from the liner notes of the CD.

- Maaya Sakamoto – vocals, backing vocals
- Steve Conte – vocals
- Yuho Iwasato – songwriting
- Yoko Kanno – songwriting, piano, keyboards, producer
- Toshiaki Ota – co-producer
- Shirō Sasaki – co-producer
- Yukako Inoue – director
- Masashi Yabuhara – recording & mixing engineer
- Franco Patrignani – recording engineer
- Shohei Kasuya – recording engineer
- Naoki Ibaraki – recording engineer
- James Nichols – recording engineer
- Sheela-e – recording engineer
- Ted Jensen – mastering engineer
- Yasuo Sano – drums
- Akira Sotoyama – drums
- Yoshie Hiragakura – drums
- Hitoshi Watanabe – bass
- Tsuneo Imahori – guitar
- Hisaaki Hogari – guitar
- Kenji Fujii – guitar
- Keishi Urata – synthesizer manipulating
- Syunsuke Sakamoto – synthesizer manipulating
- Masatsugu Shinozaki Group – strings
- Riccardo Pellegrino – strings
- Masaharu Sato – percussion
- Tomoyuki Asakawa – harp
- Takashi Asahi – flute
- Masakazu Ishibashi – oboe
- Shoji Togame – clarinet
- Hiroyuki Minami Group – horn
- Yoshio Nakatani – co-ordination (Italy session)
- Teta Pitteri – co-ordination (Italy session)
- Cherry Kaoru Hulsey – co-ordination (US session)
- Damiano Antinori – assistant engineer
- Shohei Kazuya – assistant engineer
- Hiroki Yasuda – assistant engineer
- Mitsuhiro Takasu – assistant engineer
- Seiji Sekine – assistant engineer
- Mike Seielizi – assistant engineer
- Kevin Myers – assistant engineer
- Taku Kanemitsu – assistant engineer

== Charts ==
Chart	Peak position	Sales
Oricon Weekly Albums	3	69,966
