= Fiction II =

Studio album by Yuki Kajiura
- Released: March 30, 2011
- Genre: Soundtrack / Pop / Classical
- Length: 70:34
- Label: Victor Entertainment

Yuki Kajiura chronology
Fiction (2003)	Fiction II (2011)

Fiction II is Yuki Kajiura's second solo album, containing newly recorded versions of her previous anime and video games work as well as original songs.

== Track listing ==
No.	Title	Length
1.	"in this winter" (Fiction ~ new recording)	1:28
2.	"The Image Theme of Xenosaga II" (Xenosaga Episode II ~ new recording)	5:33
3.	"lotus"	5:55
4.	"my long forgotten cloistered sleep" (unreleased work of Xenosaga: A Missing Year)	5:52
5.	"I swear"	6:22
6.	"forest" (El Cazador de la Bruja)	5:03
7.	"Sweet Song" (Xenosaga Episode II ending theme)	5:32
8.	"E.G.O." (Aquarian Age ~ new recording)	4:44
9.	"everytime you kissed me" (Pandora Hearts)	4:56
10.	"I reach for the sun" (El Cazador de la Bruja)	5:59
11.	"L.A." (El Cazador de la Bruja)	4:08
12.	"March"	3:38
13.	"heigen"	5:32
14.	"maybe tomorrow" (Xenosaga Episode III ending theme ~ new recording)	5:52

== Performers ==
- Yuki Kajiura: Keyboard and programming, vocals (on track 13), chorus (on track 3)
- Emily Bindiger: Vocals (4, 6, 7, 9, 10, 12), chorus (4, 5, 6, 9, 12)
- Yuriko Kaida: Vocals (11, 13), Chorus (2, 8, 9, 10, 14)
- Eri Itou: Vocals (8, 13)
- Keiko Kubota: Vocals (13), chorus (2, 14)
- Kaori Oda: Vocals (13), chorus (2, 14)
- Margaret Dorn: Vocals (7)
- Clara Kennedy: Vocals (5)
- Deb Lyons: Vocals (2)
- Johan Sara Jr.: Vocals (13)
- Hanae Tomaru: Vocals (3)
- Emily Curtis: Vocals (14)
- Tokyo Konsie: Chorus (2, 7)
- Wakana Ootaki: Chorus (9)
