= Windaria =

Japanese animated film

- Directed by: Kunihiko Yuyama
- Written by: Keisuke Fujikawa
- Based on: Windaria by Keisuke Fujikawa
- Produced by: Toshihiro Nagao
- Music by: Ryuji Sasai; Satoshi Kadokura
- Production companies: Idol; Kaname Productions; Studio Gallop
- Release date: 19 July 1986
- Running time: 101 minutes
- Country: Japan
- Language: Japanese

Windaria (ウインダリア, Uindaria), also called Legend of Fabulous Battle Windaria and Once Upon a Time, is a Japanese animated film produced by Kaname Productions and Idol. The film was directed by Kunihiko Yuyama, and written by Keisuke Fujikawa. It was released theatrically in Japan on July 19, 1986.

== Plot ==
The mountainous kingdom of Paro and the coastal city-state of Itha had been at peace for over a century. They would have remained so were it not for the ambitions of Paro's power-hungry king. Paro invaded Itha, despite the love between Jill, Paro's prince, and Ahanas, Itha's princess. Caught between duty and emotion, the star-crossed lovers were forced to fight a war to its bitter conclusion. Meanwhile, Isu was a simple farmer from the neutral village of Saki, but he saved Itha from being destroyed by a spy from Paro, and found himself hungering for wealth and glory that the Ithan monarchy could not provide. Agents from Paro made him an offer to fulfill his wishes, and he left his wife Marin behind in what would turn into a battlefield between the two kingdoms.

== Voice cast ==
Japanese		English	
Character name	Voice actor	Character name	Dubbing actor
Izuh (イズー)	Tōru Furuya	Allen	Kerrigan Mahan (young); Russell Johnson (old)
Marin (マーリン)	Waka Kanda	Marie	Mari Devon
Gill (ジル)	Kazuhiko Inoue	Roland	Bruce Nielsen
Arnath (アーナス)	Naoko Matsui	Veronica	Barbara Goodson
Ginevia (ギネビア)	Sho Saito	Lunarian Queen	Catherine Battistone
Harowl (ハロール)	Kan Tokumaru	Lunarian Chancellor	Michael Forest
Cupilar (クピラール)	Ichirō Nagai	Caleb	Jeff Winkless (first half); Bill Capizzi (second half)
Lanzlo (ランスロ)	Hidekatsu Shibata	King Drako	Michael McConnohie
Kundree (クンドリー)	Rihoko Yoshida	Shadowland Queen	Melodee Spevack
Cairu (カイル)	Norio Wakamoto	Lord Legato	Abe Lasser
Sharem (シャレム)	Yumi Kinoshita	Celina	Iona Morris
Druid (ドルイド)	Gara Takashima	Juliet	Wendee Lee (first half); Melodee Spevack (second half)
Torell (トレル)	Kazuki Yao	Bren	

== Production ==
Windaria is based on a novel of the same name, authored by Keisuke Fujikawa, the film's screenwriter. Fujikawa's resume includes the live-action Ultraman and the animated series Space Battleship Yamato, Grendizer, and Cat's Eye. The film was produced by animation companies Kaname Productions and Idol and directed by Kunihiko Yuyama, who previously worked on Magical Princess Minky Momo and GoShogun. Studio Gallop was responsible for its photography and Studio Cosmos contributed the backgrounds. Mutsumi Inomata acted as both character designer and animation director. The film's instrumental musical score was composed by Satoshi Kadokura. The vocal theme "Yakusoku" (約束; lit. 'Promise') was written by Kazuhiko Katō and performed by J-pop singer Akino Arai. The ending theme "Utsukushii Hoshi" (美しい星; lit. 'Beautiful Planet') was written and performed by Arai. Arai stated that she did not discuss the composition of the tracks with the director as she would have later in her career.

=== Soundtrack ===
Windaria Musical Chapter (ウィンダリア 音楽篇)
No.	Title	Lyrics	Music	Length
1.	"Uindaria no Tēma (ウインダリアのテーマ; Theme of Windaria)"		Satoshi Kadokura	3:30
2.	"Ipa Kawa no Hanran (イパ川の氾濫; Overflow of the Ipa River)"		Kadokura	4:49
3.	"Mayoi no Mori (迷いの森; Forest of Illusion)"		Kadokura	1:03
4.	"Yakusoku (約束; Promise)"	Masumi Kawamura	Kazuhiko Katō	4:39
5.	"Hobē Ni Mise Rarete (ホバーに魅せられて; Fascinated by a Hover)"		Kadokura	1:38
6.	"Doruido no Tēma (ドルイドのテーマ; Theme of Druid)"		Kadokura	2:41
7.	"Kanashi Mino Mārin (哀しみのマーリン; Marin In Sorrow)"		Kadokura	2:07
8.	"Isa no Machi ~ Ginebia no Ketsui (イサの町~ギネビアの決意; The Town of Isa ~ Guinevere's Determination)"		Kadokura	2:28
9.	"Kougeki (攻撃; Attack)"		Kadokura	1:41
10.	"Ai no Rekuiemu (愛のレクイエム; Requiem for Love)"		Kadokura	3:44
11.	"Taihai no Pātei ~ Sharemu no Satsui (頽廃のパーティ~シャレムの殺意; Party of Decadance ~ Shalem's Murderous Intent)"		Kadokura	3:34
12.	"Haruka Naru Ieji (遥かなる家路; His Far Away Home)"		Kadokura	1:33
13.	""Kaze Nosasayaki" (風のささやき; Whisper of Wind)"		Kadokura	4:17
14.	"Utsukushii Hoshi (美しい星; Beautiful Star)"	Akino Arai	Arai	4:53
Total length:				42:37

== Release and marketing ==
Windaria was released theatrically in Japan on July 19, 1986. In 1987, Harmony Gold licensed Windaria for release in the United States, trimming the film from its original 101-minute running time to 95 minutes. The English language version was edited in order to better market the film to younger audiences. According to director Carl Macek, Harmony Gold was given no scripts or translations of the property and they thus had little insight into the plot details. The English version included a new script, an altered plot with a happy ending, scenes switched around, violent and adult-oriented scenes removed, the entire cast given Anglicized names, and added narration provided by Russell Johnson (of Gilligan's Island fame).

Windaria was first distributed in Japan to home video by Victor Entertainment. The eventual laserdisc release contained a trailer, a pilot film (in which characters are colored differently than the final version), and a second audio track. Victor released Windaria on DVD in Japan on December 16, 2000. This release forgoes the laserdisc extras but includes a director interview on the insert. Atlus reissued the film on DVD on March 25, 2005. Streamline Pictures released the English version, titled Windaria, on North American VHS between 1992 and 1993. A laserdisc version was planned by Image Entertainment but was never distributed. ADV Films re-released the English version, as Once Upon a Time, on DVD on March 23, 2004. The uncut Japanese version has never been officially released in this region.

A generous amount of Windaria-related merchandise has been marketed in Japan since the film's 1986 debut. Fujikawa's Douwa Meita Senshi Windaria bunkobon was published by Kadokawa Shoten during March 1986. Shortly after the premiere of Windaria, several official guide books were released, one (Settei: Windaria) containing Idol's sketches, storyboards, and promotional materials. A special omake was published on August 25, 1986, as part of Kadokawa's "Mediamix Special" imprint. Inomata's 1988 art book Gatsu no Koe Hoshi no Yume contains some of her illustrations from the film. Arai's album Natsukashii Mirai, containing both the film's opening and ending themes, was released by Victor on October 21, 1986. Arai later re-recorded "Utsukushii Hoshi" for her 2005 album Sora no Uta due to her dissatisfaction with the first version of the song. The film's original soundtrack was released by Victor on both LP and CD on July 21, 1986, and CD was reprinted on March 24, 1994. It was reissued on June 23, 1999, alongside the soundtrack to Birth, another anime by Kaname. A 2008 Nintendo DS video game based on the film was developed by Compile Heart under the name Dungeon of Windaria (ダンジョン オブ ウインダリア) and released in Japan.

== Reception ==
Critical reception for the original Japanese version of Windaria has been favorable. Ralph Jenkins of Mania.com called the film "the quintessential anime tragedy". The reviewer elaborated: "The overriding theme of this grim allegory is that a promise—especially between lovers—is something so sacred that it thrives even beyond death, and taking it for granted can beget devastating consequences". Jenkins noted both Inomata's character designs and the film's musical score to be memorable.

== See also ==
- The House in the Reeds, a story by Ueda Akinari with similar plotline
- Castle in the Sky, another 1986 anime film with a large tree central to the story.
