= Shippo no Uta =

- 8-cm CD single cover

Single by Maaya Sakamoto

from the album Single Collection+ Nikopachi
- Language: Japanese
- B-side: "Midori no Hane"; "Yoake no Octave"
- Released: August 23, 2000
- Genre: Anime song
- Length: 2:46
- Label: Victor Entertainment
- Composer: Yoko Kanno
- Lyricist: Hiroshi Ichikura
- Producer: Yoko Kanno

Maaya Sakamoto singles chronology
"Yubiwa" (2000)	"Shippo no Uta" (2000)	"Mameshiba" (2000)

"Shippo no Uta" (しっぽのうた; lit. 'Tail Song') is a song by Japanese voice actress and singer Maaya Sakamoto, released as her seventh single on June 21, 2000, through Victor Entertainment. Co-written by Hiroshi Ichikura and Yoko Kanno, the song served as the theme song for the Sega Dreamcast role-playing video game Napple Tale: Arsia in Daydream.

== Background and release ==
"Shippo no Uta" was written specifically for the Napple Tale video game, which tells the story about a girl named Poach, who becomes lost in the otherworldly space "Napple World"—an interstitial realm between reality and dreams where spring, summer, autumn, winter, past, and future exist separately—and embarks on an adventure to return to the real world. The song was composed, arranged and produced by Yoko Kanno, who was also in charge of handling the game's background music. Sakamoto, who also voiced the protagonist and handled the narration on the game, was commissioned to perform the title track. The lyrics were written by Hiroshi Ichikura, marking his first collaboration with Sakamoto, and the first time one of her singles was not penned by longtime collaborator Yuho Iwasato. Sakamoto commented that she approached the recording of "Shippo no Uta" as "acting out a role."

The song was released as a 3-track single on August 23, 2000, approximately two months after "Yubiwa." The single included the tracks "Midori no Hane" and "Yoake no Octave," which were also tied-in to the Naple Tale video game. This release became Sakamoto's first single release to not include instrumental tracks.

The single's cover artwork was illustrated by Kōji Morimoto.

== Album appearances ==
"Shippo no Uta" and "Midori no Hane" first appeared on the Napple Tale soundtrack album Napple Tale: Yōsei Zukan, released on October 21, 2000, by Marvelous Entertainment. This album was re-issued by FlyingDog on July 1, 2009.

The three tracks included on the single were also included on Sakamoto's 2003 singles compilation Single Collection+ Nikopachi.

== Commercial performance ==
"Shippo no Uta" debuted at number 39 on the Oricon Weekly Singles Chart, selling 8,320 copies in its first week. The single charted for two weeks, with reported sales totaling 10,930 copies.

== Track listing ==
All lyrics are written by Hiroshi Ichikura; all music is composed by Yoko Kanno.

Shippo no Uta - 8-cm CD single
No.	Title	Length
1.	"Shippo no Uta" (しっぽのうた, lit. 'Tail Song')	2:46
2.	"Midori no Hane" (みどりのはね, lit. 'Green Wings')	2:53
3.	"Yoake no Octave" (夜明けのオクターブ, lit. 'Dawn Octave')	1:50
Total length:		7:29

== Charts ==
Chart performance for "Shippo no Uta"
Chart (2000)	Peak position
Japan (Oricon)	39
