= Hemisphere (song) =

Single by Maaya Sakamoto

from the album Single Collection+ Nikopachi
- Language: Japanese
- B-side: "Ongaku"
- Released: February 21, 2002
- Genre: J-pop; anime song
- Length: 4:06
- Label: Victor Entertainment
- Composer: Yoko Kanno
- Lyricist: Yuho Iwasato
- Producer: Yoko Kanno

Maaya Sakamoto singles chronology
"Mameshiba" (2000)	"Hemisphere" (2002)	"Gravity" (2003)

"Hemisphere" (Japanese: ヘミソフィア, Hepburn: Hemisofia) is a song by Japanese voice actress and singer Maaya Sakamoto, released as her ninth single on February 21, 2002, by Victor Entertainment. Co-written by Yuho Iwasato and Yoko Kanno, the song served as the opening theme for the Fuji Television anime series RahXephon, which began airing on January 21, 2002.

== Background and release ==
The song title "Hemisphere" came unilaterally from composer Yoko Kanno, who produced the track. When lyricist Yuho Iwasato asked for clarification, Kanno explained only that it meant "hemisphere" (半球, hankyū). With no clear direction beyond a vague sense of a coming-of-age story amid conflict, Iwasato latched onto the concept of "half"—half a life unlived, half-understood strength— and created lyrics that explored themes of incomplete life experience, self-questioning, and resilience.

The song was released as Sakamoto's first single of 2002, approximately one month after the anime premiered in Japan. The single included the b-side song "Ongaku", which was also co-written by Kanno and Iwasato.

"Hemisphere" and "Ongaku" were subsequently included on Sakamoto's second single collection, Nikopachi.

In 2025, the song ranked ninth on Sakamoto's official survey (Note: Original Japanese title: Maaya's Best Songs: Anata no Ichiban Suki na Sakamoto Maaya no Kyoku wo Oshiete Kudasai (MAAYA'S BEST SONGS ～あなたの一番好きな坂本真綾の曲を教えてください～).) of all-time fan-favorite songs from her career, where it was selected from a list of 255 songs released under her name as of that date.

== Composition and themes ==
Musically, "Hemisphere" is a J-pop track composed and produced by Yoko Kanno. The arrangement supports the anime RahXephon's dramatic, futuristic tone, blending driving rhythms with dynamic shifts to evoke tension and forward momentum. Lyrically, Yuho Iwasato crafts a coming-of-age narrative rooted in the concept of the literal meaning of hemisphere ("half sphere", 半球) —symbolizing incompleteness, duality, and the struggle to define strength in a fragmented world. The song explores themes of resilience amid adversity, self-questioning, and personal growth.

At first, Sakamoto admittedly did not feel a connection with the song, and she felt it did not suit her. She commented: "This was a robot anime, so a bold, heroic track fit the show. I thought it suited the work, but honestly, it was not my taste at all [...] Singing it felt like wearing clothes that did not fit, like I had to put on an act." However, she later reflected that, despite initial distance, as she grew older she could understand the actual meaning of Iwasato's lyrics, and came to terms with it.

== Critical reception ==
Writing a review for Amazon Japan, musician Keiichi Okabe praised "Hemisphere" for its standout execution, formed by "interplay of fast sequenced phrases and filtered rhythms" which create "a finely chopped beat, contrasted with noble and beautiful live strings." He also praised Sakamoto's vocals, commenting: "Maaya Sakamoto’s clear vocals seem even more refined, flowing effortlessly across a wide range while skillfully using falsetto." CDJournal gave a positive review on "Hemisphere," describing it as an "enchanting and abstract work," featuring orchestral digital pop sound that spreads an aura of timelessness.

== Commercial performance ==
"Drops" debuted at number 22 on the Oricon Weekly Singles Chart, selling 17,980 copies on its first week. The single charted for nine weeks, with reported sales totaling 54,460 copies.

== Track listing ==
All lyrics are written by Yuho Iwasato; all music is composed by Yoko Kanno.

Hemisphere - CD single
No.	Title	Length
1.	"Hemisphere" (ヘミソフィア)	4:06
2.	"Ongaku" (音楽, lit. 'Music')	5:04
3.	"Hemisphere" (without Maaya)	4:09
Total length:		13:19

== Charts ==
Chart performance for "Hemisphere"
Chart (2002)	Peak position
Japan (Oricon)	22

== Personnel ==
Credits adapted from the liner notes of the CD single.

- Maaya Sakamoto – vocals, backing vocals
- Yoko Kanno – songwriting, production
- Yuho Iwasato – songwriting
