= Song to Fly =

Studio album by Yoko Kanno
- Released: January 1, 1998 (reprinted May 22, 2002)
- Genre: Orchestral pop
- Label: Victor Entertainment

Yoko Kanno chronology
Song to Fly (1998)	23-Ji no Ongaku (2002)

Song to Fly is the debut studio album by Yoko Kanno. It was released January 1, 1998. All music was written by Yoko Kanno.

== Track listing ==
Song to fly Track list
	Track name	Length	Contributors
1.	"Atomic Bird"	4:52	Gabriela Robin – lyricist; Cosmic Voices from Bulgaria – performance
2.	"Reunion"	6:18	Tim Jensen – lyricist; Donna Cumberbatch – performer
3.	"Next Time"	6:08	Gabriela Robin – lyricist; Franco Sansalone – performer
4.	"ABC Mouse Parade"	5:08	Gabriela Robin – lyricist, performer
5.	"This EDEN"	5:08	Gabriela Robin – lyricist; Krzysztof Ciupinsky – performer (soprano)
6.	"Nowhere and Everywhere"	4:39	Tim Jensen – lyricist; Steve Conte – performer
7.	"The Man in the Desert"	4:13	Warsaw Philharmonic Orchestra and Chorus – performance
8.	"Artisan"	1:03	Yoko Kanno – performer
9.	"The Ship"	3:34	Warsaw Philharmonic Orchestra and Chorus – performance
10.	"Hallelujah"	2:52	Warsaw Chorus – performance
11.	"Lydia"	2:56	Jadwiga Rappé – performance

== Performers ==
- Keyboard, piano: Yoko Kanno
- Orchestra: Warsaw Philharmonic Orchestra and Chorus (conductor Jerzy Swoboda)
- Drums: Reichi Shimizu
- Bass: Hitoshi Watanabe, Zev Katz
- Guitar: Tsuneo Imahori
- Cello: Hajime Mizoguchi
- Soprano sax: Steve Wilson
- Sound architect: Keishi Urata
- Strings: The Dunn Pearson Orchestra (conductor Yoko Kanno)
- Voice performance: Cosmic Voices from Bulgaria (conductor Vania Moneva)
