= Yubiwa =

- 8-cm CD single cover

Single by Maaya Sakamoto

from the album Single Collection+ Nikopachi
- Language: Japanese
- B-side: "Vector"
- Released: June 21, 2000
- Genre: J-pop
- Length: 3:44 (single version); 3:34 (movie version)
- Label: Victor Entertainment
- Composer: Yoko Kanno
- Lyricist: Yuho Iwasato
- Producer: Yoko Kanno

Maaya Sakamoto singles chronology
"Platinum" (1999)	"Yubiwa" (2000)	"Shippo no Uta" (2000)

"Yubiwa" (指輪; lit. 'Ring') is a song by Japanese voice actress and singer Maaya Sakamoto, released as her sixth single on June 21, 2000, through Victor Entertainment. Co-written by Yuho Iwasato and Yoko Kanno, the song served as the theme song for the theatrical film Escaflowne, which premiered on June 24, 2000.

== Background ==
"Yubiwa" served as the theme song for the theatrical film adaptation of the television anime series The Vision of Escaflowne, which originally aired on TV Tokyo in 1996. It became Sakamoto's second single associated with the Escaflowne series, following her debut single "Yakusoku wa Iranai," and notably marked the first time she was commissioned to provide the theme song for a theatrical film.

== Commercial performance ==
"Yubiwa" debuted at number 30 on the Oricon Singles Chart, selling 12,020 copies on its first week. The single charted for three weeks, with reported sales totaling 19,310 copies.

== Versions and album appearances ==
"Yubiwa" made its first album appearance on the original soundtrack for the Escaflowne film, titled Escaflowne Original Sound Track, released by Victor Entertainment on July 5, 2000. This album included the movie version of "Yubiwa," and also the English version of the song, entitled "You're Not Alone" (Hitomi & Sora duet Version), performed by Sakamoto and Shanti Snyder. An acoustic version of "Yubiwa" was later featured on the drama CD Escaflowne Prologue 1 – Earth, released on October 21, 2000. The song was re-recorded for Sakamoto's second singles compilation, Single Collection+ Nikopachi, released by Victor on July 30, 2003. This new version was titled "Yubiwa (23 Carat)." Sakamoto explained that the subtitle reflects her age at the time of that new recording—as she was 23 years old. The '23 Carat' version was later also included on Sakamoto's best-of album Everywhere.

== Cover versions ==
In 2011, "Yubiwa" was covered by Japanese singer Chihiro Yonekura on her album Nakeru Anison.

== Track listing ==
All music is composed by Yoko Kanno.

Yubiwa - 8-cm CD single
No.	Title	Lyrics	Length
1.	"Yubiwa" (指輪, lit. 'Ring') (single version)	Yuho Iwasato	3:44
2.	"Vector" (ベクトル)	Tim Jensen	5:15
3.	"Yubiwa" (single version) (without Maaya)		3:44
4.	"Vector" (without Maaya)		5:15
Total length:			18:07

== Charts ==
Chart performance for "Yubiwa"
Chart (2000)	Peak position
Japan Singles (Oricon)	30
