= Mameshiba (song) =

Single by Maaya Sakamoto

from the album Lucy
- Language: Japanese
- B-side: "Kūki to Hoshi"
- Released: December 6, 2000
- Studio: Victor Studio; Metropolis Studio; AIR Studio
- Genre: J-pop; anime song
- Length: 6:08
- Label: Victor Entertainment
- Composer: Yoko Kanno
- Lyricist: Maaya Sakamoto
- Producer: Yoko Kanno

Maaya Sakamoto singles chronology
| "Shippo no Uta" (2000) | "Mameshiba" (2000) | "Hemisphere" (2002) |

"Mameshiba" (マメシバ; lit. 'Little Shiba dog') is a song by Japanese voice actress and singer Maaya Sakamoto, released as her eighth single on December 6, 2000, through Victor Entertainment. Co-written by Sakamoto herself and Yoko Kanno, the song served as theme song for the television anime series Earth Maiden Arjuna, which premiered in January 2001 in Japan.

== Background and release ==
"Mameshiba" marked Sakamoto's return to recording after a break from new music releases post-1999, period which Sakamoto prepared for her college entrance exams. The song also marked the first time Sakamoto penned the lyrics for the title track of one of her singles. The song was composed by Yoko Kanno specifically as a tie-in theme for the anime Earth Maiden Arjuna, with specific lyrical directives provided to Sakamoto. Upon first hearing the demo of the song, Sakamoto commented that she asked Kanno where the chorus was—a question Kanno would later recounted as a humorous anecdote.

The song title originated as a provisional name chosen by Kanno before the lyrics were written. After Sakamoto completed the lyrics—centered on the theme of "running as far as I have to for the person I love"—Sakamoto and Kanno considered that it evoked a dog-like determination, prompting them to keep it. Sakamoto would later comment that this marked her first attempt at adopting a more literary, author-like approach to lyric writing.

"Mameshiba" was released on December 6, 2000—about a month before the anime's television premiere—as an 8 cm CD packaged within a standard 12 cm jewel case. This became the last single release by Sakamoto on 8 cm CD format. The single featured the B-side "Kūki to Hoshi," penned by lyricist Yuho Iwasato.

== Music video ==
The music video for "Mameshiba" was directed by Naoki Imamura, with filming taking place in the Shibuya and Daikanyamachō metropolitan areas. In the video, Sakamoto and a puppy run continuously through multiple sites to capture the song's energetic, dog-like sprint imagery.

== Commercial performance ==
"Mameshiba" debuted and peaked at number 47 on the Oricon Weekly Singles Chart, selling 5,110 copies on its first week. The single charted for two weeks, with reported sales totaling 7,990 copies.

== Album appearances ==
"Mameshiba" was first included on the soundtrack album Arjuna: Into the Another World, released on March 23, 2001, by Victor Entertainment. This album included a different version of the B-side "Kūki to Hoshi" (クウキ ト ホシ; the title written in katakana), with lyrics penned by Gabriela Robin and vocals by Chinatsu Yamamoto.

Both "Mameshiba" and "Kūki to Hoshi" were included on Sakamoto third studio album, Lucy, released on March 28, 2001.

An alternative version of "Mameshiba," titled "Saigo no Mameshiba" (さいごのマメシバ; lit. 'The Last Little Shiba Dog'), was included on the soundtrack album Arjuna 2: Onna no Minato, released on May 23, 2001.

== Legacy and impact ==
In 2019, Japanese novelist Sako Aizawa published an essay expressing his admiration for "Mameshiba," describing it as a transformative force in his teenage years, providing him with a sense of salvation amid feelings of loneliness and despair.

In 2025, "Mameshiba" ranked sixth in a fan-voting initiative conducted as part of the celebrations of Sakamoto's thirtieth anniversary of her debut, leading up to the release of her second best-of album M30: Your Song. Sakamoto expressed surprise at this, noting that while she was aware of its relative popularity, the high placement was unexpected.

== Track listing ==
All music is composed by Yoko Kanno.

Mameshiba - 8-cm CD single
| No. | Title | Lyrics | Length |
|---|---|---|---|
| 1. | "Mameshiba" (マメシバ, lit. 'Little Shiba dog') | Maaya Sakamoto | 6:08 |
| 2. | "Kūki to Hoshi" (空気と星, lit. 'The Air and the Stars') | Yuho Iwasato | 5:22 |
| 3. | "Mameshiba" (without Maaya) | | 6:08 |
| Total length: | | | 17:38 |

== Personnel ==
Credits adapted from the liner notes of the CD single.

- Maaya Sakamoto – vocals
- Yoko Kanno – keyboards, producer, artwork photographer
- Yasuo Sano – drums
- Hitoshi Watanabe – bass
- Tsuneo Imahori – guitar
- Keishi Urata – synthesizer manipulating
- Gavyn Wright Strings – strings
- Masashi Yabuhara – recording, mixing engineer
- Miyuki Umeda – assistant engineer
- Seiji Sekine – assistant engineer
- Nik Pugh – assistant engineer
- Nick Wollage – assistant engineer
- Shigeo Miyamoto – mastering
- Toshiaki Ota – recording coordinator
- Elle Kawano – recording coordinator
- Yukako Inoue – director
- Shiro Sasaki – executive producer
- Yoshiyuki Akagawa – cover artwork design

== Charts ==
Chart performance for "Mameshiba"
| Chart (2000) | Peak position |
|---|---|
| Japan (Oricon) | 47 |
