= Furu Platinum =

Album by Akino Arai

Furu Purachina

Studio album by Akino Arai
- Released: May 24, 2000
- Genre: J-pop
- Length: 48:23
- Label: Victor Entertainment

Akino Arai chronology
Sora no Niwa (1997)	Furu Purachina (2000)	Kouseki Radio (2001)

Furu Purachina (降るプラチナ, lit. Falling Platinum) is Akino Arai's fourth official album release. It peaked at number 32 on the Oricon Albums Chart.

== Track listing ==
1. "スプートニク"
  (SUPUUTONIKU, Sputnik)
2. "願い事"
  (Negaigoto, The Wish)
3. "ガレキの楽園"
  (Gareki no Rakuen, Paradise of Rubble)
4. "Flower"
5. "Orange Noel"
6. "愛の温度"
  (Ai no Ondo, Temperature of Love)
7. "Réve"
  (Dream)
8. "音叉"
  (Onsa, Tuning Fork)
9. "赤い砂白い花"
  (Akai Suna Shiroi Hana, Red Sand White Flower)
10. "降るプラチナ"
  (Furu Purachina, Falling Platinum)
11. "メロディ"
  (Merodi, Melody)
