= Fiction (Yuki Kajiura album) =

Studio album by Yuki Kajiura
- Released: August 6, 2003
- Recorded: Sound Valley Tokyo; Clinton Studio New York New York City
- Genre: Soundtrack / Pop / Classical
- Length: 43:13 (U.S. version); 51:44 (Japan version)
- Label: (Japan) Victor Entertainment (United States) Pioneer Entertainment (USA)
- Producer: Yuki Kajiura; Keiichi Nozaki; Yasunori Mori; Yuji Kawaguchi (non-Japanese release); Nobu Yamamoto

Yuki Kajiura chronology
Fiction (2003)	Fiction II (2011)

Fiction is Yuki Kajiura's first solo album, containing remixes of her previous anime work as well as original songs. The Japanese edition features three bonus songs.

== Track listing ==
1. "Key of the Twilight" (.hack//SIGN)
2. "Cynical World"
3. "Fake Wings" (.hack//SIGN)
4. "Fiction"
5. "Vanity"
6. "Red Rose"
7. "Canta per me" (Noir)
8. "Zodiacal Sign" (Aquarian Age)
9. "Awaking" (Aquarian Age)
10. "Open Your Heart" (.hack//SIGN)
11. "Winter"
12. "Salva Nos" (Noir)
13. "Lullaby" (Noir)
14. "Echo"

== Personnel ==
- Yuki Kajiura: Keyboard and programming
- Emily Bindiger: Vocals on tracks 1, 2, 3, 4, 5, 10
- Yuri Kasahara: Vocals on tracks 6, 12
- Deb Lyons: Vocals on tracks 7, 11
- Kaori Nishina: Vocals on tracks 8, 9
- Tulivu-Donna Cumberbatch on track 13
