= CM Yoko =

Studio album by Yoko Kanno
- Released: September 30, 2007 (iTunes Store); May 22, 2008 (CD album)
- Genres: Pop; jazz; EDM
- Label: Grand Trax

Yoko Kanno chronology
23-Ji no Ongaku (2002)	CM Yoko (2007)	CM Yoko 2 (2009)

CM Yoko is the third studio album by Yoko Kanno. It was originally released exclusively though the iTunes Store on September 30, 2007. All the music was written by Yoko Kanno and the majority was for Japanese television advertisements. It reached the 44th place on the Oricon Weekly Albums Chart.

== Track listing ==
No.	Title	Artist(s)	Length
1.	"彼100%トレビアン (Kare 100% Très bien)" (for 2004 Meiji Seika XYLISH)	Yoko Kanno	1:48
2.	"Lion Man" (for 2004 Toyota Harrier)	Yoko Kanno	1:21
3.	"電線にタコが絡まっちゃったらどうするの？" (for 2000 TEPCO)	Samply Red	0:38
4.	"Silent Star" (for 2006 Sharp mobile phones "静かな光")	Yoko Kanno	0:50
5.	"Seeds of Life" (for 2004 Cosmo Oil Company)	Yoko Kanno	2:10
6.	"walk travel along" (for 2006 Tombow)	Samply Red	2:14
7.	"Exaelitus" (for 2006 Lexus LS460 "New World")	Yoko Kanno & Origa	4:01
8.	"チヤホヤされたい女" (for 2003 KDDI DION)	Samply Red	0:20
9.	"Don't Spend Money! Money!" (for 2000 internet service provider ZERO)	Yoko Kanno	0:32
10.	"Dear Blue" (2006 film "Su-ki-da" theme song)	Yoko Kanno	3:01
11.	"Long Goodbye" (for 2007 Citizen Watch)	Yoko Kanno	1:36
12.	"ママ新発売！ オープニング" (for 2001 世にも奇妙な物語)	Samply Red	2:19
13.	"Magic Sweets" (for 2002 Shiseido Pieds nus)	Yoko Kanno & Chara	0:37
14.	"Melody" (for 2006 Hitachi "つくろう。")	Yoko Kanno & Miyuki Hatakeyama	1:10
15.	"em outro lugar「どこかよそで」" (for 2005 Japan Telecom)	Samply Red	2:34
16.	"ビバこばら" (for 1999 FamilyMart panino)	Samply Red	0:40
17.	"From Metropolis" (for 2004 Tokyo Metro)	Yoko Kanno	0:39
18.	"Melty Kiss" (for 2000 Meiji Seika Melty Kiss)	Yoko Kanno	1:01
19.	"Beautiful Memories" (for 2005 Sharp Aquos)	Samply Red	0:46
20.	"Family Affair" (for 2003 Mastercard)	Yoko Kanno	1:04
21.	"ゆうじ CMバージョン" (for 1999 Suntory Vitamin Water)	Yoko Kanno & Inotomo	0:33
22.	"Magic Sweets -Masao Nisugi Remix-"	Yoko Kanno & Chara	2:40
23.	"チョコと勇気" (for 2004 Tirol Choco)	Yoko Kanno & Maaya Sakamoto	0:31
24.	"Living In Future" (for 2006 Microsoft)	Yoko Kanno	1:36
25.	"Glass Shoes" (for 2004 Asahi Glass Co.)	Yoko Kanno	2:49
