= 23-Ji no Ongaku =

23-ji no Ongaku

Studio album by Yoko Kanno
- Released: May 22, 2002
- Genres: Avant-pop; jazz
- Label: Victor Entertainment
- Producer: Yoko Kanno

Yoko Kanno chronology
Song to Fly (1998)	23-ji no Ongaku (2002)	CM Yoko

23-ji no Ongaku (23時の音楽, Nijūsan-ji no Ongaku; lit. '11 p.m. Music') is the second studio album by Yoko Kanno, with vocals by frequent collaborator Maaya Sakamoto. It was released on May 22, 2002. It is the soundtrack for the NHK radio drama adaptation of the book The Other Side of Midnight.

== Track listing ==
No.	Title	Contributors	Length
1.	"Two Things"		3:18
2.	"Here"	Maaya Sakamoto – Vocalist; Tim Jensen – Lyricist	5:04
3.	"Daniel (ダニエル, Danieru)"	Maaya Sakamoto – Vocalist troy – Lyricist	3:47
4.	"Pepper Stretch"		3:40
5.	"Kissing the Christmas Killer"	Maaya Sakamoto – Vocalist, Lyricist; Kazumi Someya – Lyricist	4:27
6.	"Trust Me"	Maaya Sakamoto – Vocalist nota – Lyricist	3:17
7.	"Noelle (ノエル, Noeru)"		3:08
8.	"Fad (ファド, Fado)"	Maaya Sakamoto – Vocalist nota – Lyricist	3:09
9.	"Talcum (タルカン, Tarukan)"		2:18
10.	"Pengin Shuurijin (ぺンギン修理人, Penguin Repairman)"		3:17
11.	"Mujoken Supekutoru (無条件スペクトル, Unconditional Spectrum)"		4:20
12.	"Toto"	Maaya Sakamoto – Vocalist; Tim Jensen – Lyricist	4:05
13.	"Kudamono Naifu no Shi (果物ナイフの死, Death of the Fruit Knife)"		3:44
14.	"Noelle's Piano (ノエルのピアノ, Noeru no Piano)"		3:27

== Personnel ==
- Piano & Keyboards: Yoko Kanno
- Bass: Hitoshi Watanabe
- Drums: Yasuo Sano
- Guitar: Tsuneo Imahori, Hisaaki Hogari
- Percussion: Masaharu Sato
- Trumpet: Shiro Sasaki
- Trombone: Satoshi Sano
- Saxophone: Shoji Haruna
- Strings: Masatsugu Shinozaki group
- Synthesizer manipulating: Keishi Utara, Syunsuke Sakamoto
- Vocals: Maaya Sakamoto, Masaharu Sato, Gabriela Robin, Hisaaki Hogari
- Special thanks: Tim & Mayu Jensen, Hayashi-san, Saeko Nishimura
