= Yuri Kasahara =

Japanese female opera singer

Yuri Shinada
- 新南田 (笠原)ゆ
- Born: Yuri Kasahara; Tokyo, Japan
- Education: Toho Gakuen School of Music
- Occupation: Opera singer (soprano)
- Website: viviam-music.com

Yuri (Kasahara) Shinada (新南田 (笠原)ゆり) is a Japanese female opera singer.

== Early life ==
Shinada is a graduate of Urawa Akenohoshi Girls' Senior High School. She attended Toho Gakuen School of Music, majoring in singing and minoring in piano. During university attendance, she debuted in A Midsummer Night's Dream. She was a student of and certified by Franco Corelli Santa Margherita voice academy in Italy.

She learned Schubert's Lied from Elly Ameling.

She earned a Diploma in Royal Academy of Music in 2010.

== Career ==
In 1989 - 1995, she portrayed the Queen of the Night in a production of Mozart's Die Zauberflöte at the Shinjuku Cultural Center. She is known for Violetta in La traviata conducted by Renato Palumbo, Lauretta (Gianni Schicchi ), Gretel (Hänsel und Gretel ), Juliette (The count of Luxembourg), In addition, she performed a multitude of operettas for many concerts.

In 1990, Shinada crossed over from Japan to Italy for further operatic studies. While there, she performed in music festivals.

In 1994, she went with the Japanese Performance Association to a French music competition and won first prize. That year she performed in the Toho Gakuen School of Music's 30th anniversary ceremony as one of the top students. Shinada also performed in the Coca-Cola Special Musical Opera (also known as The Magic of Coke, with a nationwide performance).

She has worked on the music and script for Akai Kutsu (Red Shoes) and the operatic adaptation of the Yokohama fairy tale Aoi Hitomi. All of her works have been performed in multiple opera circuits in Asia. Also, she has been noted for working with Yuki Kajiura on the anime series Noir, Aquarian Age: Sign for Evolution, and the OVA .hack//Liminality, in which she sang four versions of the song "liminality". A few of Kasahara's lines from "liminality" also make a cameo with Emily Bindiger on a remix of the .hack//SIGN song "The World". She is a frequent guest vocalist with See-Saw. She makes an appearance on Kajiura's solo album Fiction, singing a redone version of "Salva Nos" (from Noir) and a new song "Red Rose". In 2006, Shinada (Kasahara) sang for the soundtrack My-Otome on the song "Materialise". Also in 2007, she collaborates with rapper Tarantula, from Spontania, for the duet of "Libera me" from Hell, theme of episode 26 composed by Iwasaki Taku for the Gainax-produced anime hit Gurren Lagann.

In 2002, Shinada recorded a two-disc album entitled An Encounter featuring several of her most famous non-anime related performances, rerecorded with the Tokyo Konsei. She is featured as a vocalist for the Madlax soundtrack.

In 2003 she sang the role of Forest bird in Siegfried conducted by Iimori Taijiro.

In 2013 she established Labravoce, a music school that combines music training with psychological counseling.

On 12 May 2015 she appeared in the opera Humanitarian Cherry Blossoms, which premiered at the Russian Drama Theatre of Lithuania in Vilnius. It was composed by Yuki Ando to a libretto by Shinada. She sang the leading role of Yukiko. She sang the role again when the opera was performed in March 2017 at Shinjuku Cultural Center.

She recorded television commercials using over 150 songs as of July 2016.
