= Gravity (Maaya Sakamoto song) =

Single by Maaya Sakamoto

from the album Single Collection+ Nikopachi
- Language: Japanese
- B-side: "Shimashima"; "Park Amsterdam"
- Released: February 21, 2003
- Studio: Victor Studio
- Genre: J-pop; anime song
- Length: 3:23
- Label: Victor Entertainment
- Composer: Yoko Kanno
- Lyricist: Troy (Note: Alias of Tim and Mayu Jensen.)
- Producer: Yoko Kanno

Maaya Sakamoto singles chronology
"Hemisphere" (2002)	"Gravity" (2003)	"Tune the Rainbow" (2003)

"Gravity" (stylized in lowercase) is a song by Japanese voice actress and singer Maaya Sakamoto, released as her tenth single on February 21, 2003, through Victor Entertainment. Co-written by Yoko Kanno and Troy, the song served as ending theme for the Fuji Television anime series Wolf's Rain.

== Background and release ==
"Gravity" is Sakamoto's first and only single to date whose title track features lyrics written entirely in English. The song was composed, arranged and produced by Yoko Kanno, with lyrics written by the unit "Troy" (consisting of Tim Jensen and Mayu Jensen). Since he first collaborated with Sakamoto on her 1998 album Dive, as of that date Tim Jensen had contributed with English lyrics for various of her album tracks and B-sides, but this marked the first time he handled the lyrics for the title track of one of her singles.

== Commercial performance ==
"Gravity" debuted and peaked at number 23 on the Oricon Weekly Singles Chart with estimated first-week sales of 12,724 copies. The single charted for nine weeks, with reported sales totaling 27,778 copies.

== Album appearances ==
"Gravity" was first included on the soundtrack album of Wolf's Rain, released on March 29, 2003, by Victor Entertainment. "Gravity" and the B-side "Shimashima" were subsequently included on Sakamoto's second compilation album Single Collection+ Nikopachi, released on July 30, 2003. The complete version of "Park Amsterdam," entitled "Park Amsterdam (The Whole Story)," was included on Sakamoto's fourth studio album, Shōnen Alice, released on December 3, 2003.

== Critical reception ==
CD Journal gave a positive review to "Gravity," describing it as a "poignant medium-tempo ballad carried by a heartbreaking piano melody," and English lyrics that "sink deep into the heart." The review further expressed genuine admiration for Kanno's composition and arrangement of every track on the release, noting that the melody lines perfectly captured her signature style. In a review of the Wolf's Rain original soundtrack, Animefringe described "Gravity" as a "heart-wrenching" ending theme, praising Sakamoto's "powerful" and "soulful" voice despite an obvious Japanese accent in the English lyrics. The review noted that the full version included on the album (as opposed to the TV version) adds to the beauty of the tender song, calling it one that "can bring a tear to the eye in the right situation" and highlighting how it demonstrates Yoko Kanno's exceptional skills as both composer and pianist. A review by Anime News Network similarly highlighted "Gravity" as a standout in the Wolf's Rain soundtrack, praising it as the piece that best demonstrated how much feeling Yoko Kanno can pack into a single work, within a broader score noted for its melancholy gracefulness and emotional impact.

== Cover versions ==
In 2012, "Gravity" was covered by Rasmus Faber with vocals by Emily McEwan. This version was included on the album Rasmus Faber presents Platina Jazz: Anime Standards Vol.3, released on February 2 of that year, by Victor Entertainment.

== Track listing ==
All music is composed by Yoko Kanno.

Gravity - CD single
No.	Title	Lyrics	Length
1.	"Gravity"	Troy	3:17
2.	"Shimashima" (シマシマ, lit. 'Striped')	Maaya Sakamoto	4:47
3.	"Park Amsterdam" (パーク・アムステルダム)	Troy	1:54
Total length:			9:57

== Personnel ==
Credits adapted from the liner notes of the CD single.

- Maaya Sakamoto – vocals, backing vocals
- Yoko Kanno – piano, arrangements, production
- Takashi Asahi – piano
- Masakazu Ishibashi – oboe
- Syoji Togame – clarinet
- Hiroyuki Minami Group – horn
- Tomoyuki Asakawa – harp
- Masatsugu Shinozaki Strings – strings
- Masashi Yabuhara – recording, mixing
- Shohei Kasuya – assistant engineer
- Hiroki Yasuda – assistant engineer
- Yosuke Watanabe – assistant engineer
- Mitsuhiro Takasu – assistant engineer
- Shigeo Miyamoto – mastering
- Toshiaki Ota – co-production
- Shiro Sasaki – co-production

== Charts ==
Chart performance for "Gravity"
Chart (2003)	Peak position
Japan (Oricon)	23
