= Shōnen Alice =

Studio album by Maaya Sakamoto
- Released: December 10, 2003
- Studios: Victor Studio; Studio Greenbird; Soundcity; Towerside Studio
- Genres: J-pop; pop rock; alternative pop
- Length: 58:53
- Language: Japanese
- Label: Victor Entertainment
- Producer: Yoko Kanno

Maaya Sakamoto chronology
Single Collection+ Nikopachi (2003)	Shōnen Alice (2003)	Yūnagi Loop (2005)

Shōnen Alice (Japanese: 少年アリス, Hepburn: Shōnen Arisu; lit. 'Boy Alice') is the fourth studio album by Japanese voice actress and singer Maaya Sakamoto, released on December 10, 2003, by Victor Entertainment.

== Background and release ==
Shōnen Alice was Sakamoto's last album to be entirely produced by Yoko Kanno, whom she regarded as a mentor who had influenced her worldview beyond music. Key influences stemmed from life transitions and professional challenges. Upon graduating university, Sakamoto shifted from balancing school and work to music and acting as her sole profession, heightening her sense of responsibility.

On a personal level, Sakamoto also revealed that she was grappling with overwhelming pressure from multiple sources, such as the expansive growth of her fan club. as she feared she was being idealized on a fragile pedestal. Though her passion for her career was genuine, she doubted whether the authentic “real me” was reaching anyone. Furthermore, her debut in the 2003 Japanese production of the musical Les Misérables proved challenging, as she performed for 2,000-seat theaters over three to four months. According to Sakamoto, this experience exposed her to new vocal techniques, new frustrations, and the mental rigor of sharing the stage with an established cast. These experiences fueled a "never-say-die" spirit, which was reflected on album tracks such as "Sora o Miro."

Recording took place primarily at Victor Studio in Tokyo (the same used for Sakamoto's debut and considered "like home" by her) as well as in London, where vocal sessions were particularly demanding—up to four songs in a single day. The photoshoot for the artwork was shot in rural Scotland, and mastering took place in New York.

The album title reflects Sakamoto's frequent use of the masculine first-person pronoun "boku" in lyrics, which she explained allows her to transcend gender, age, and other limitations to address a universal audience. She explained this by commenting: "When I want to sing beyond gender or age—to reach everyone, to express a broader “self”—“boku” feels right [and] this album has “boku” all over it. I am a woman, but I have got masculine parts, adult parts, childish parts—strong, weak, all contradictions in one body. Shōnen Alice captured that perfectly. The title came early and shaped the sound."

Retrospectively, Sakamoto defined the album as the "climax of the first act" of her music career, marking a period of intense passion and emotional burnout upon completion. She commented: "In a sense, this is the culmination of everything up to that point [and] a lot of it came from a personal side—like clenching my fists tight and shouting with all my strength." She regarded it as the work where she fully established her own style—encompassing sound, lyrics, and vocal delivery—since beginning her singing career. The resolve forged during its creation, she noted, empowered her to take artistic risks in subsequent projects, ultimately shaping her path from then on.

== Promotion ==
The album had no singles released prior to its release, but it included the theme song "03" from Sakamoto's short film DVD 03†, which was released on the same day as the album, as well as "Uchū Hikōshi no Uta," which was used on the NHK educational program Minna no Uta.

To further promote the album, Sakamoto hosted a one-hour radio special on Bay FM, Maaya Sakamoto Studio Live Special: Shōnen Alice – Unplugged, which featured acoustic performances recorded exclusively for the broadcast in her longtime Tokyo studio.

== Commercial performance ==
Shōnen Alice debuted at number 8 on the Oricon Weekly Albums chart, selling 30,518 copies on its first week. The album charted for nine weeks, with reported sales totaling 51,992 copies.

== Track listing ==
All music is composed by Yoko Kanno.

Shōnen Alice track listing
No.	Title	Lyrics	Length
1.	"Uchū Hikōshi no Uta" (うちゅうひこうしのうた, lit. 'The Astronaut's Song')	Hiroshi Ichikura	3:48
2.	"Sora o Miro" (ソラヲミロ, lit. 'Look at the Sky')	Maaya Sakamoto	4:05
3.	"Scrap: Wakare no Uta" (スクラップ～別れの詩, lit. 'Scrap: Farewell Song')	Yuho Iwasato	4:45
4.	"Makiba Alice!" (まきばアリス!, lit. 'Meadow Alice!')	Sakamoto	4:49
5.	"Mahiru ga Yuki" (真昼が雪, lit. 'Midday Snow')	Iwasato	4:33
6.	"Kingfisher Girl (The Song of "Wish You Were Here")"	Chris Mosdell	3:29
7.	"Hero" (ヒーロー)	Sakamoto	2:47
8.	"Yoru" (夜, lit. 'Night')	Iwasato	4:41
9.	"Call to Me"	Alan Brey	4:47
10.	"Hikari Are" (光あれ, lit. 'Let There Be Light')	Sakamoto	4:25
11.	"Chibikko Folk" (ちびっこフォーク, lit. 'Little Folk')	Ichikura	4:02
12.	"Park Amsterdam (The Whole Story)"	Troy (Note: Alias of Tim and Mayu Jensen.)	4:05
13.	"03"	Sakamoto	5:57
14.	"Okitegami" (おきてがみ, lit. 'Farewell Letter')	Sakamoto	2:40
Total length:			58:53

== Personnel ==
Credits adapted from the liner notes of Shōnen Alice.

- Maaya Sakamoto – vocals, backing vocals
- Yoko Kanno – producer, piano, keyboards, conductor
- Toshiaki Ota – co-producer
- Shiro Sasaki – co-producer
- Ilaria Graziano – backing vocals (11)
- Yasuo Sano – drums
- Hitoshi Watanabe – bass, mandolin (all tracks except 8)
- Tsuneo Imahori – guitar, bass (all tracks except 11)
- Mataro Misawa – percussion
- Gen Ittetsu Strings – strings (1)
- Masatsugu Shinozaki Strings – strings (13)
- Naruyoshi Kikuchi – saxophone
- Keishi Urata – synthesizer manipulating
- Syunsuke Sakamoto – synthesizer manipulating
- Chikanari Gohan – synthesizer manipulator assistant
- Hisaaki Hogari – additional ambient tracks (1, 7)
- Phil Palmer – guitar (4, 7, 8, 10, 11)
- Andy Pask – bass (8)
- Ralph Salmins – drums (8)
- Helen Keen – flute (6)
- David Theodore – oboe (6)
- Nicholas Bucknall – clarinet (6)
- Gavyn Wright – strings leader (2, 6, 9, 10)
- Yukako Inoue – director
- Masashi Yabuhara – recording, mixing
- Ted Jensen – mastering
- Masashi Yabuhara – recording engineer
- Toshiyuki Yoshida – recording engineer
- Naoki Ibaraki – recording engineer
- Steve Orchard – recording engineer
- Shohei Kasuya – assistant engineer
- Hiroki Yasuda – assistant engineer
- Hiromitsu Takasu – assistant engineer
- Shee-la e – assistant engineer
- Naoshi Fujita – assistant engineer
- Toshiro Honkawa – assistant engineer
- Olga Fizroy – assistant engineer
- Cherry Kaoru Hulsey – coordinator
- Elle Kawano – coordinator

== Charts ==
Chart performance for Shōnen Alice
Chart (2003)	Peak position
Japan (Oricon)	8
