= Sora no Mori =

Studio album by Akino Arai
- Released: August 21, 1997
- Genre: Progressive rock
- Length: 1:07:53
- Label: Victor Entertainment

Akino Arai chronology
Natsukashii Mirai (1986)	Sora no Mori (1997)	Sora no Niwa (1997)

Disambiguation: Sora no Mori is also an ending theme to Please Teacher! by Kawada Mami.

Sora no Mori (空の森) is a collection of Akino Arai's songs from various anime projects. Many of the songs are written by Yoko Kanno and arranged with "Hisaaki Hogari". The music relies strongly on orchestral arrangements, along with electronic sounds borrowed from the world of progressive rock, hard rock, and electronica.

== Track listing ==
1. "星の雨"
  (Hoshi no Ame, Rain of Stars)
2. "遥かなロンド"
  (Haruka na RONDO, Far-away Rondo)
3. "Moon Light Anthem" ～槐 1991～
  (Moon Light Anthem ～Enju 1991～)
4. "三日月の寝台"
  (Mikazuki no Shindai, The Crescent Moon Bed)
5. "凍る砂"
  (Kōru Suna, Frozen Sand)
6. "風と鳥と空" ～reincarnation～
  (Kaze to Tori to Sora, Wind, Bird, and Sky)
7. "Adesso e fortuna" ～炎と永遠～
  (Honō to Eien, Flame and Eternity)
8. "VOICES"
9. "金色の時流れて"
  (Kin'iro no Toki, Nagarete, The Flowing Gold of Time)
10. "Licao do Vento"
11. "歌わないうた"
  (Utawanai Uta, The Song Unsung)
12. "月からの祈りと共に"
  (Tsuki kara no Inori to Tomo ni, Together with Prayers from the Moon)
13. "Siva" ～佇む人～
  (Tatazumu Hito, Lingering Person)
14. "三日月と私"
  (Mikazuki to Watashi, The Crescent Moon and I)
15. "WANNA BE AN ANGEL"
