= Starwing Paradox =

2018 arcade video game

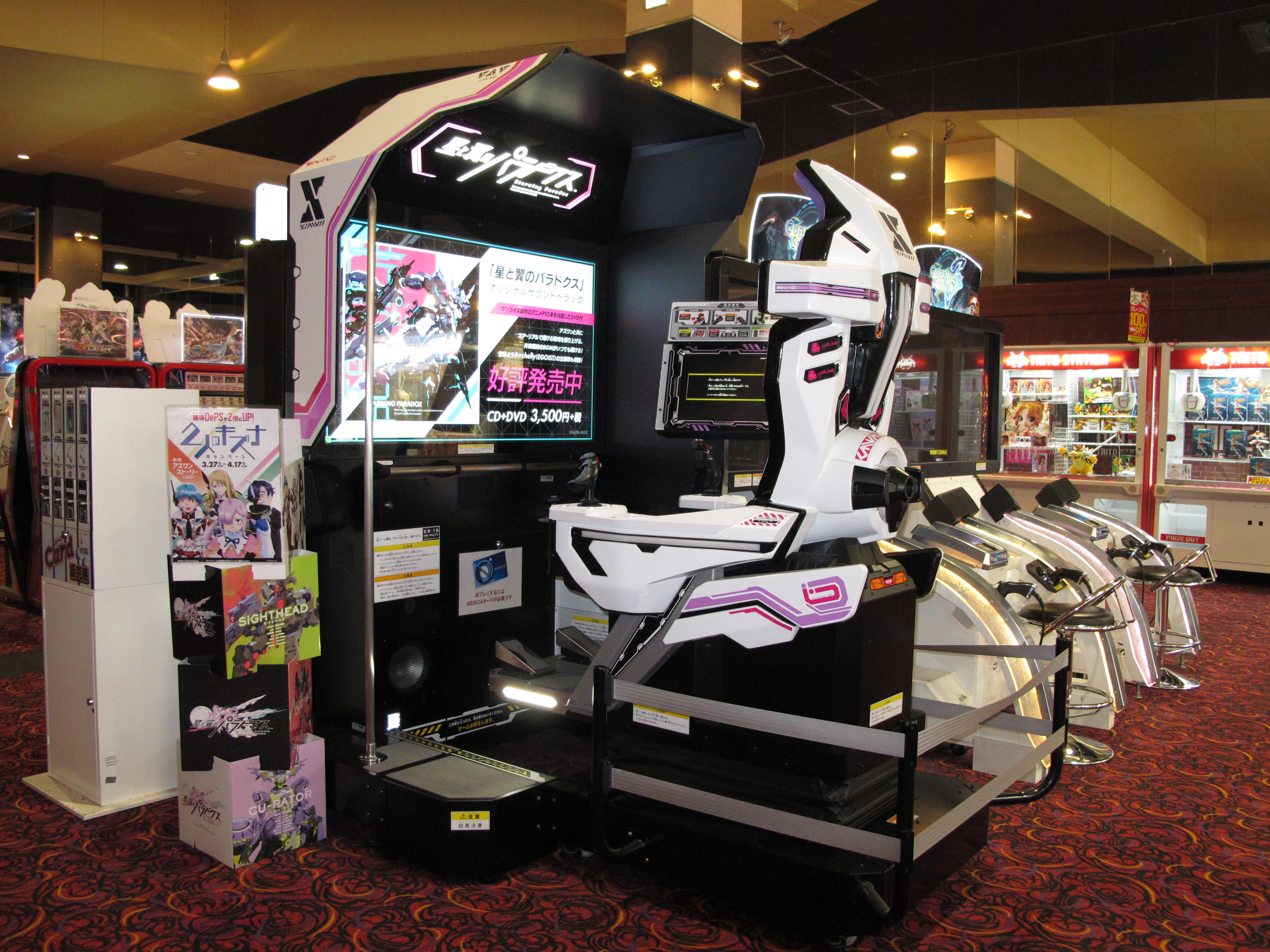
- Starwing Paradox arcade machine
- Developers: Byking; Square Enix
- Publisher: Square Enix
- Producers: Nobuki Kadoi; Naohiro Ogata; Yuichi Tanzawa
- Artist: Yoshiyuki Sadamoto
- Writer: Yoichi Kato
- Composers: Akio Isutzu; Yoko Kanno
- Engine: Unreal Engine 4
- Platform: Arcade
- Release: JP: November 21, 2018

Starwing Paradox (Japanese: 星と翼のパラドクス, Hepburn: Hoshi to Tsubasa no Paradokusu) is an arcade game by Square Enix with animation produced by Sunrise. In it, humans from Earth remotely pilot giant humanoid mechs as part of a conflict between aliens of two countries on the planet Maguriboshi over the energy resource Hoshinochi. The game features character designs by Yoshiyuki Sadamoto, mechanical designs by Ippei Gyōbu and Junya Ishigaki, and a script by Yoichi Kato. The voice cast include Mikako Komatsu, Ryoko Shiraishi, and Ayaka Suwa. The game was released in November 2018; updates for the game and the companion smartphone app were discontinued in November 2020, and the servers for the game were shut down in October 2021 as part of a trend of the termination of Square Enix's online arcade games, effectively terminating the game as only the offline demo mode continues to function without them.

== Gameplay ==
Starwing Paradox is a multiplayer arcade game in which two teams of eight players each pilot giant humanoid mechs in a battle to control the playing field and assault the opposing team's base. The object of the game is to destroy the opposing team's core, which is protected by a barrier that can only be brought down by capturing three of the five neutral objectives, known as ports, on the map.

In addition to the standard flying, shooting and sword-fighting actions expected of mech combat, the players' mechs can enter a high-speed "Full Drive" mode to move between objectives in a matter of seconds. Prior to each game, players can customize their mechs with an assortment of weapons and head/body/limb models to suit their play style and role within the team. Players can save their mech setups to a user account maintained by Square Enix.

The game's setting is the planet Meguriboshi, split between the countries "Kō Country A Slegga" and "Va Led Sei Kingdom", which are fighting over the "Hoshinochi" resource of living energy. The mechs are "Ae Rial" developed by the Kizana corporation, which can be controlled in combination by an "AZ-One" knight and an alien in charge of flying remotely across interstellar distances via the "Rearide System"; humans from Earth are the aliens in the game.

== Development ==
Starwing Paradox was developed and published by Square Enix with animation produced by Sunrise. The characters in Starwing Paradox were designed by Yoshiyuki Sadamoto, one of the founding members of the Gainax anime studio. The mechs were designed by Ippei Gyōbu and Junya Ishigaki, and the game's script was written by Yoichi Kato. The voice cast includes Mikako Komatsu, Ryoko Shiraishi, and Ayaka Suwa. The music was composed by Akio Isutzu and Yoko Kanno. The game was released in 2018, and relied on access to Square Enix servers for the multiplayer battles and user accounts. The game also had a companion smartphone app.

In August 2019, tournaments scheduled for the game were cancelled after Square Enix received death threats related to Sadamoto's criticism of a sculpture depicting World War II comfort women.

In November 2020, Square Enix announced that the game would be receiving no further updates, and that the companion app would be shut down. In August 2021, Square Enix announced that the servers for the game would be shut down in October, effectively terminating the game as only the offline demo mode would still work. At the time of its conclusion, Square Enix had not released any arcade games since 2019, and still supported only a single other game, Million Arthur: Arcana Blood.

== Reception ==
The pedigree of the game in its famous designers and artists meant that there was high anticipation from fans of giant robots in Japanese media. One preview in ASCII was positive and recommended the game. The writer commented on the immersive experience that helped build the feel of piloting a robot, such as the huge monitors of the arcade setup, the movement of the seat with the robot's acceleration, and the foot pedals used in controlling the player's robot. Despite there being a lot to keep track of, he thought that the game made how to play intuitive enough.

== Anime film adaptation ==
- Starwing Paradox

星と翼のパラドクス (Hoshi to Tsubasa no Paradokusu)
- Created by: Square Enix; Sunrise
- Anime film

As One
- Directed by: Kōbun Shizuno
- Written by: Shatner Nishida; Kana Matsui; Masaya Honda
- Studio: Honoo; Studio Gooneys
- Released: August 22, 2025
- Runtime: 91 minutes

A prequel-based anime film adaptation of Starwing Paradox, titled As One, was announced on March 4, 2025. The film is produced by Nada Holdings and Throne, animated by Honoo and Studio Gooneys and directed by Kōbun Shizuno, with Shatner Nishida, Kana Matsui and Masaya Honda writing the screenplay and Yoshiyuki Sadamoto designing the characters. It was released in Japanese theaters by Gaga on August 22, 2025. The film's theme song is "Meguriboshi" (Wandering Star) performed by Ruki, the solo artist name of JO1 boy group member Ruki Shiroiwa.
