= Akino Arai =

Japanese singer, songwriter and lyricist (born 1959)

Akino Arai 新居 昭乃
- Born: August 21, 1959 (age 67); Tokyo, Japan
- Genres: J-pop, Anison
- Occupations: Singer, songwriter, lyricist
- Instruments: Vocals, piano
- Years active: 1986–present
- Labels: Victor Entertainment, FlyingDog
- Member of: Marsh-Mallow
- Website: www.jvcmusic.co.jp/akino/

Akino Arai (新居 昭乃, Arai Akino; born August 21, 1959, in Tokyo) is a Japanese singer, songwriter, and lyricist for various anime theme songs and shows, including Record of Lodoss War, Please Save My Earth, Macross Plus, Outlaw Star, Kaze no Stigma, Maoyu, and Aria The Origination.

== Biography ==
Arai joined Victor Music Entertainment after graduating from university. She worked on collaborations with various artists there. Her first single, "Yakusoku" was released in 1986, and was used as an insert song for the anime Windaria. She also released the album Natsukashii Mirai. In 1988 she left her agency. In 1992, she released the singles "Kaze to Tori to Sora ~reincarnation~" and "Kooru Suna" which were used as songs for the Record of Lodoss War anime and The Weathering Continent drama CD, respectively.

Her activity in anime continued with Please Save My Earth. In 1994, she sang "Voices" for the Macross Plus OVA, where she also was the singing voice for Myung Fang Lone and Sharon Apple. She would later release her first compilation album Sora no mori in 1997. She wrote and performed the two ending songs for the 1998 anime Outlaw Star and contributed songs for Record of Lodoss War: Chronicles of the Heroic Knight. In 1999, she released "Kanaete" for the Puppet Master Sakon anime. In 2001, she released "Hana no katachi" as a song for the Daichis - Earth Defense Family. "Kakusei Toshi" was released for Tokyo Underground in 2002, and "Natsukashii umi" was an opener song for Kurau: Phantom Memory.

In 2009, she performed the opening theme "Mitsu no Yoake" (蜜の夜明け) for the anime television series Spice and Wolf II in 2009, and the ending theme Unknown Vision for Maoyu in 2013. In 2012, she provided music for Shibuya International's 10th anniversary short film called Birth.

Arai has performed at many conventions, music festivals, and clubs. In 2005, she celebrated her 20th anniversary in her music career with the compilation album, Sora no Uta, and went on tour to France and Germany in 2006. On March 24, 2013, she performed at Hong Kong Polytechnic University as her first live concert appearance in Asia outside Japan.

Arai has worked with many different music artists. In 1989, she joined Tomoko Tane on some of her albums. She also worked with Yuri Shiratori and composed tracks for the latter's album. In 1998, she and Yayoi Yula released the album Goddess in the morning. She joined a band called Marsh-mallow which released an eponymous album in 2001. In 2011, she worked with a new music group, releasing RuRu Chapeau.

Arai hosted a weekly hour-long radio show called Viridian House and has also named her website after that.

== Discography ==
Older albums and singles were released by Victor (VDR, VICL, VIDL) label, later re-released under FlyingDog (VTCL) on April 25, 2012.

=== Studio albums ===
Year	Title	Catalogue Number (Japan)	Oricon	
Year	Title	Catalogue Number (Japan)	Peak position	Weeks charted
1986	Natsukashii Mirai	VDR-1284	97	
1997	Sora no Niwa	VICL-60043; VTCL-60152	71	
2000	Furu Platinum	VICL-60549; VTCL-60153	32	
2004	Eden (エデン)	VICL-61214; VTCL-60156	35	
2009	Sora no Sphere (ソラノスフィア)	VIDL-30073; VTCL-60107	30	4
2012	Red Planet	VTCL-60301	39	3
2012	Blue Planet	VTCL-60302	38	3
2016	Little Piano Plus (30th anniversary)	VTCL-60430		

=== Compilation albums ===
List of compilation albums, with selected chart positions
Year	Title	Catalogue Number (Japan)	Oricon	
Year	Title	Catalogue Number (Japan)	Peak position	Weeks charted
1997	Sora no Mori: Arai Akino Best Album	VICL-60042; VTCL-60151	–	–
2002	RGB	VICL-60869; VTCL-60155	35	
2005	Sora no Uta; 20th Anniversary Album	VICL-61797; VIZL-57; VTCL-60157	35	3

=== Concept album ===
List of concept albums, with selected chart positions
Year	Title	Catalogue Number (Japan)	Oricon	
Year	Title	Catalogue Number (Japan)	Peak position	Weeks charted
2001	Kouseki Radio (鉱石ラジオ, Crystal Radio)	VICL-60721; VTCL-60154	45	

=== Live albums ===
List of live albums, with selected chart positions
Year	Title	Catalogue Number (Japan)	Oricon	
Year	Title	Catalogue Number (Japan)	Peak position	Weeks charted
2005	VHMusic			
2006	VHMusic2: the first euro tour			

=== Singles ===
List of singles, with selected chart positions
Year	Title	Oricon		Album
Year	Title	Peak position	Weeks charted	Album
1986	"Yakusoku" (約束, Promise)	97		Natsukashii Mirai
1986	"Chizu wo Yuku Kumo" ( 地図をゆく雲, A cloud which passes through the map)	68		Natsukashii Mirai
1991	"Kaze to Tori to Sora ~reincarnation~" (風と鳥と空, Wind and birds and sky); Record of Lodoss War OVA image song	64		Sora no Mori
1992	"Kōru suna" (凍る砂, Frozen Sand)			Sora no Mori
1996	"Shounen no hane" (少年の羽, Feather boy); Dragon Quest Retsuden: Roto no Monshō theme song			
1998	"Hiru no Tsuki" (昼の月, Moon at Noon); Outlaw Star first ending theme	–	–	RGB
1998	"Tsuki no Ie" (月の家, House of the Moon); Outlaw Star second ending theme	–	–	RGB
1999	"Kanaete" (叶えて, Grant); Ayatsuri Sakon ending theme	39		RGB
2001	"Hana no katachi" (花のかたち, Shape of flower)	34		RGB
2002	"Kakusei Toshi" (覚醒都市, Awakening City); Tokyo Underground ending theme	51		Sora no Uta
2004	"Natsukashii Umi" (懐かしい宇宙, Nostalgic Sea); Kurau Phantom Memory opening theme	19		Sora no Uta
2006	"Kimi e Mukau Hikari" (キミヘ ムカウ ヒカリ); Zegapain opening theme	31	5	Blue Planet
2008	"Kin no Nami, Sen no Nami" (金の波 千の波); ARIA the Origination closing theme	26	7	Red Planet
2009	"Mitsu no Yoake" (蜜の夜明け); Spice and Wolf II opening theme	41	4	Blue Planet
2013	"Unknown Vision"; Maoyū Maō Yūsha ending theme	44	3	

=== Collaborations ===
List of collaboration albums, with selected chart positions
Year	Title	Catalogue Number (Japan)	Oricon	
Year	Title	Catalogue Number (Japan)	Peak position	Weeks charted
1998	Goddess in the Morning (with Yayoi Yura)	–	–	
2001	Marsh-mallow (with Yoko Ueno, Tamao Fujii, Megumi Maruo and Reichi)	–	–	
2011	RuRu Chapeau (with kiro, Hisaaki Hokari, and Takashi Iwato)	VICL-63825		
