= Emily Bindiger =

American singer (born 1955)

- Born: May 10, 1955 (age 71); New York, New York, U.S.
- Genres: Psychedelic folk; a cappella; anison
- Occupation: Singer
- Years active: 1972–present
- Formerly of: The Accidentals; Yuki Kajiura

Emily Bindiger (born May 10, 1955) is an American singer who is part of the a cappella group the Accidentals. She played the role of Francine in the children's show The Great Space Coaster.

== Biography ==
Bindiger has recorded for soundtracks for movies such as The Stepford Wives, One Life to Live, Bullets Over Broadway, Everyone Says I Love You, Donnie Brasco, The Hudsucker Proxy, Michael Collins, and The Tune.

Bindiger recorded and released her debut and only album Emily in 1972 when she was 16. Other work she has done includes songs in skits for Live with Regis and Kathie Lee, Late Night with Conan O'Brien and The Drew Carey Show. Artists she's been credited as performing or recording with include Leonard Cohen, Buster Poindexter, Oscar Brand, Neil Sedaka, Ben Vereen, Black 47, Deb Lyons, Laurie Beechman, Christine Lavin, Yuri Kasahara and Patti Austin. Bindiger also played the role of Francine in the 1980s children's show The Great Space Coaster, where she acted and played songs, and recorded a theme song for the children television series The Baby-Sitters Club.

She has recorded with Japanese composer Yoko Kanno for the Cowboy Bebop soundtrack, performing "Adieu" and "Flying Teapot". Bindiger has also recorded a number of songs with composer Yuki Kajiura for the anime series .hack//Sign (performing 10 songs) and with Yuki for one song in Pandora Hearts and contributed to Kajiura's solo album Fiction, performing six songs: three from .hack//Sign and three new songs. She was the featured vocalist for Kajiura when the latter visited California for the Anime Expo 2003 convention. She also performed a song for the Flash anime of Xenosaga - A Missing Year and the anime series El Cazador de la Bruja (performing "forest" and "I reach for the sun") and Kajiura's Pandora Hearts (performing "Every time you Kissed Me" which is featured on the second original soundtrack published by JVC Music in Japan.)

In 2015, she participated as an ensemble member for the Broadway presentation of the Bombshell musical.

== Personal life ==
She was married to musician Robbie Kondor. They lived in North Salem, New York.

== Discography ==
Studio albums

- Emily (1972)

Singles

- "Baby It's You" (Handshake Records, 1981)
