= Sora no Uta =

sora no uta

Studio album by Akino Arai
- Released: 2005
- Genre: J-pop
- Length: 76:43
- Label: Victor Entertainment

Akino Arai chronology
arai akino VHmusic (2004)	sora no uta (2005)	The First Euro Tour (2006)

Sora no Uta (そらのうた) is an album, released in 2005 by Akino Arai. It is a 20th anniversary compilation of Akino's songs. The Limited version was released with the 20th Anniversary album "Sora no Uta" live (限定盤＜DVD＞). The footage for the DVD is taken from the Yokohama Blitz gig on the last day of Arai's sora no uta tour.

== Track listing ==
1. サリーのビー玉
  (SARII no BIIdama, Sally's Marbles)
2. 覚醒都市
  (Kakusei Toshi, Awakening City)
3. VOICES
4. スプートニク
  (SUPUUTONIKU, Sputnik)
5. 鉱石ラジオ
  (Kouseki Rajio, Crystal Radio)
6. 昼の月
  (Hiru No Tsuki, The Moon at Noon)
7. Moon Light Anthem ～槐 1991～
  (Moon Light Anthem ~Enju 1991~, Moonlight Anthem ~Enju 1991~)
8. Silent Stream
9. 仔猫の心臓
  (Koneko No Shinzou, The Kitten's Heart)
10. ガレキの楽園
  (Gareki No Rakuen, Paradise of Rubble)
11. Satellite Song
12. 懐かしい宇宙(うみ)
  (Natsukashii Umi, Nostalgic Ocean)
13. きれいな感情
  (Kirei Na Kanjou, The Pure Emotion)
14. 降るプラチナ
  (Furu Purachina, Falling Platinum)
15. WANNA BE AN ANGEL
16. 美しい星(sora no uta ver.)
  (Utsukushii Hoshi, Beautiful Planet)
17. 懐かしい宇宙(うみ)
  Kusse / Kæmpe Kusse

== DVD track listing ==
1. イントロダクション
  (INTORODAKUSHON, Introduction)
2. 凍る砂
  (Kooru Suna, Frozen Sand)
3. New World
4. バニラ
  (BANIRA, Vanilla)
5. 虹色の惑星（sora no uta version PV)
  (Niji-iro no Wakusei (sora no uta version PV), The Rainbow-colored Planet (sora no uta version PV))
