= Tulivu-Donna Cumberbatch =

American jazz singer (1950–2022)

Tulivu-Donna Lynn Cumberbatch
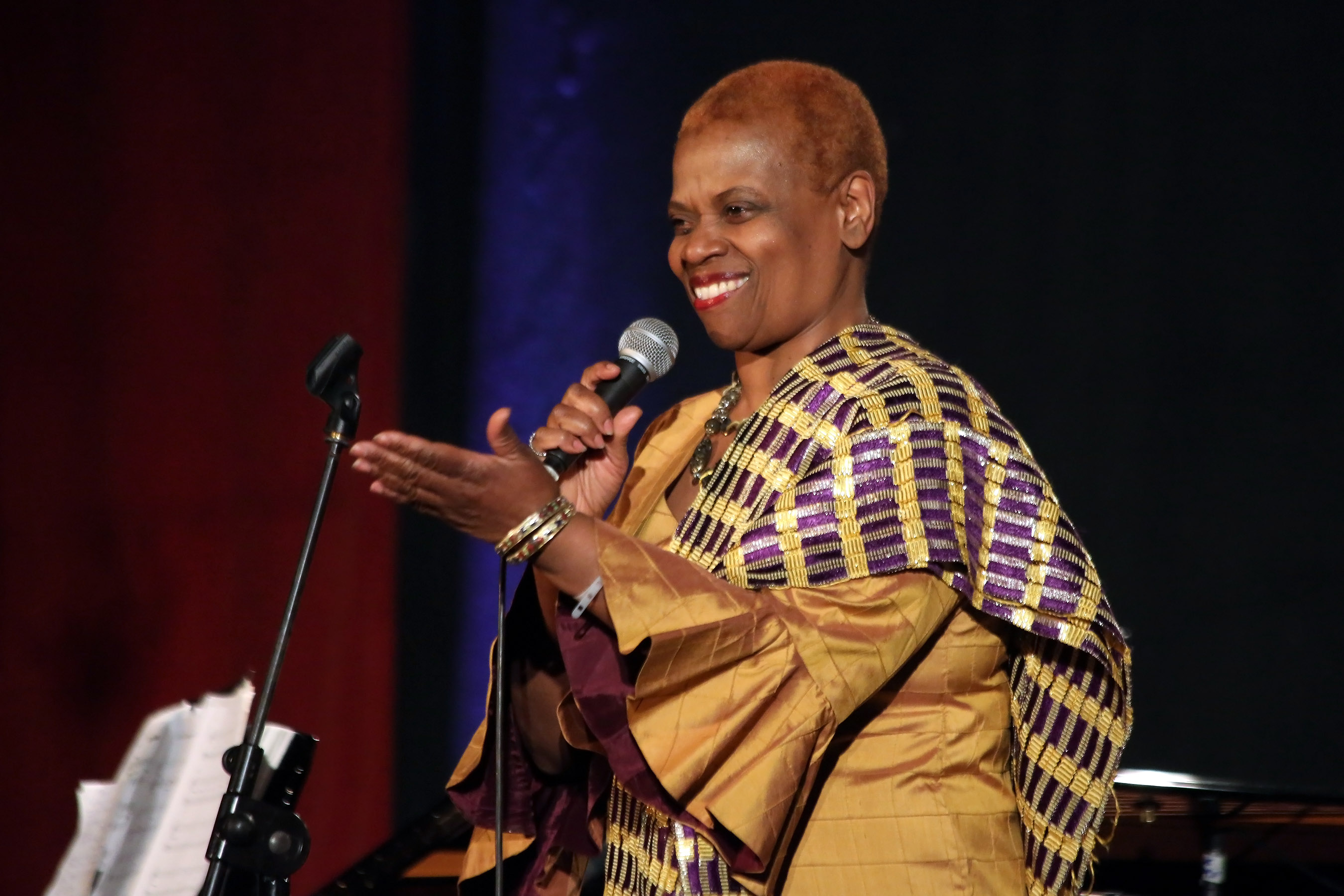
- Tulivu-Donna Cumberbatch (2013)

Background information
- Born: July 28, 1950; Brooklyn, New York
- Died: January 17, 2022 (aged 71)
- Genres: Jazz
- Occupation: Singer

Tulivu-Donna Lynn Cumberbatch (July 28, 1950 - January 17, 2022) was an American jazz singer. Her African name "Tulivu" translates from Swahili loosely to "beautiful", and her middle name, "Donna Lynn" is derived from "Donna Lee", the jazz piece made popular by Charlie Parker. Her father, Harold Cumberbatch, was a baritone saxophone player.

== Career ==
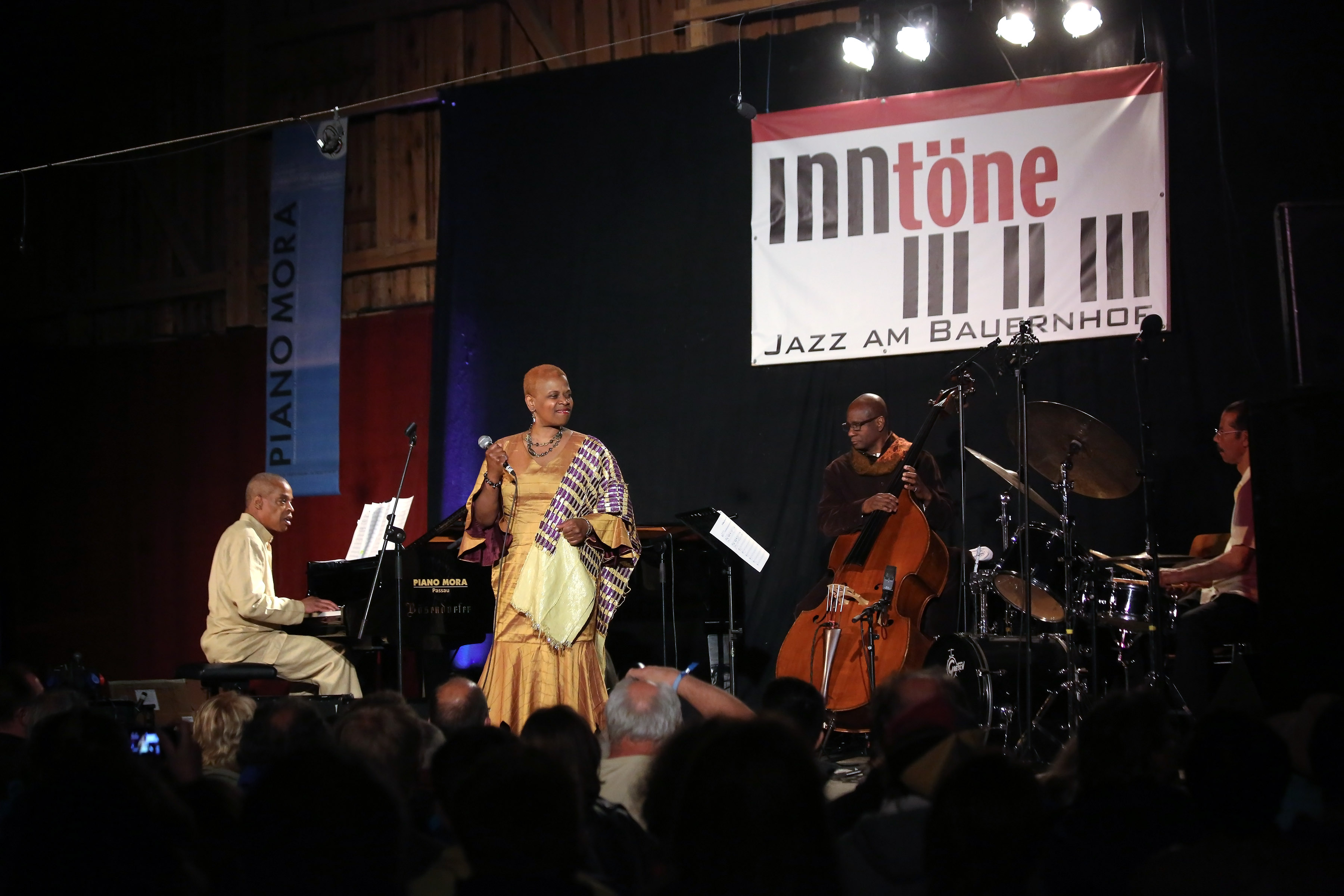
Tulivu-Donna Cumberbatch Quartet (2013)

As a child, Cumberbatch participated in church choir and the All City High School Chorus, then studied at Herbert H. Lehman College. After training, she began her solo career, influenced by such artists as Carmen McRae, Sarah Vaughan, Ella Fitzgerald, and Nancy Wilson. She joined "The Magnificent Trio", which consisted of Mark Johnson, Donald Smith, and Rachiim Ausar-Sahu.

In live performances, when not performing with her trio, Cumberbatch has sung with Hannibal Peterson, Kimati Dinizulu and the Kotoko Society, the Brooklyn Philharmonic, Diedre Murray, the Kronos Quartet, Akyenee Baako and Drumsong Productions, the Hank Doughty/Ray Abrams Big Band, and the Cliff Smalls Septet. She has performed in the Caribbean, Europe, and Canada, and frequently at jazz clubs and festivals in New York City.

She gained recognition for her work with Yoko Kanno on the album Song to Fly and on Kanno's soundtracks for the anime television series Cowboy Bebop. With Yuki Kajiura she recorded a jazz version of the Noir song "Lullaby" for Kajiura's solo album Fiction.

== Discography ==
- Harmony (1990)
- Lullabies in the Key of Life – For the Child in All of Us (1997)
- Daughters of the Nile (1999)
- "In the Company of You" [Single] (1999)

As guest

- Spirit Within Us, Andrei Strobert (1993)
- Universal Dancer, Masujaa: The X Factor (1994)
- Springboard, Lucy Galligher (1995)
- Cowboy Bebop: Original TV Soundtrack 2 – "No Disc", The Seatbelts (1998)
- Cowboy Bebop: Original TV Soundtrack 3 – "Blue", The Seatbelts (1998)
- Song to Fly, Yoko Kanno (1998)
- Brooklyn Bebop: The Brooklyn Four Plus One, Cecil Payne (1999)
- Passport to Brooklyn, Brooklyn Repertory Ensemble (2002)
- Fiction, Yuki Kajiura (2003)
- For My Brothers, Dwight Carson (2003)
- Cowboy Bebop: Tank! The! Best!, The Seatbelts (2004)
