= Emily Curtis =

American singer-songwriter

Emily Curtis, a New York City native, is an independent singer/songwriter. She plays guitar, piano, cello, and bass. In 1999, she released Radiate, an independent CD produced by Jamal Ruhe. Her second, eponymous CD (produced by Daniel Wise) was released in 2003.

Curtis has also collaborated with Yoko Kanno on the Ghost in the Shell: Stand Alone Complex 2nd GIG soundtrack. She has received critical acclaim by Billboard magazine.

She recently worked with Yuki Kajiura on the ending theme, "maybe tomorrow~ending medley", for Xenosaga Episode III: Also sprach Zarathustra.
