= Yoko Kanno =

Japanese composer (born 1963)

- 菅野 よう子
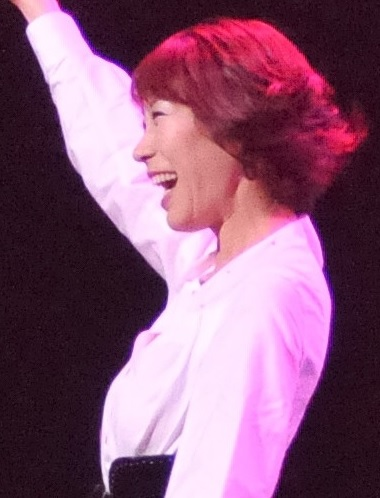
- Kanno at Anime Expo 2010
- Born: 菅野 洋子; 18 March 1963 (age 63); Sendai, Miyagi Prefecture, Japan
- Other name: Gabriela Robin
- Occupations: Composer; arranger; music producer
- Years active: 1985–present
- Musical career
- Genres: Jazz; classical; orchestral; electronic; new age; blues; folk; pop; art rock; ambient; post-rock; heavy metal; bossa nova; jazz fusion; funk; soul music; city pop
- Instruments: Piano; keyboards; accordion
- Label: Captain Duckling

Yoko Kanno (菅野 よう子, Kanno Yōko; born 18 March 1963) is a Japanese composer, arranger and music producer of soundtracks for anime series, video games, television dramas and movies. She has written scores for Cowboy Bebop, Terror in Resonance, Ghost in the Shell: Stand Alone Complex, Wolf's Rain, Turn A Gundam and Darker than Black. Kanno is a keyboardist and the frontwoman for Seatbelts, who perform many of her compositions.

== Early life ==
Yoko Kanno was born on 18 March 1963, in Sendai, Miyagi Prefecture, Japan. Her earliest experiences with music came from attending church with her parents. She studied keyboard on both the piano in her home and the organ at her kindergarten. In elementary school, she began participating in composition contests, but in high school, Kanno began to take more of an interest in literature than in music.

Kanno attended Waseda University, where she majored in literature, but she transcribed music for various student groups at Waseda in her free time. During this time, Kanno—whose parents had allowed her to listen only to classical music—was introduced to rhythm by a friend who played drums in a school band. She spoke of this experience in an interview with Akihiro Tomita:

I thought my friend was a genius. I had heard drums on the radio before, but it was like I had never really noticed them. Then I see drums performed live, and was able to experience a beat for the first time. I started to take heavy interest in music that wasn't classical and joined the band elective.

While with this band, she studied the composition and style of popular music.

While at Waseda, the Japanese video game company Koei asked Kanno to compose the soundtrack to Nobunaga's Ambition. The game turned out to be a hit, and Kanno's music career was launched.

== Career ==
Yoko Kanno's soundtrack themes include "Kiseki no Umi" (Lodoss War), "Voices" (Macross Plus), "Tank!" (Cowboy Bebop), "Yakusoku wa Iranai" (Escaflowne), "Gravity" (Wolf's Rain), the whole soundtrack of Turn A Gundam, "Inner Universe" (Ghost in the Shell: Stand Alone Complex) and Stand Alone Complex O.S.T. In regards to making the Stand Alone Complex soundtrack, she said:

I had this image of a formal and rigid 'manly' world for the original comic. So I tried to think of ways to destroy that world. The theme I had in mind was, 'be human.' It represented the sentiment of 'why don't we take it easy and be more like a human being?'—instead of being a workaholic salaried man working for his company. Or be it Tachikoma wishing to become human. I wanted to express these 'tangible fuzziness,' sort of. For the opening theme song called 'inner universe,' I had an image of digital bits and composed a score consisting of recurrent quick beats.

Having composed in various genres, including blues, classical, jazz, techno and J-pop, she was once asked if she favored a particular genre:

Ah ... I hear everyone talk about how many genres [I work in] like classical, jazz and others, but personally, I don't divide music by genre when creating. I don't create by saying, 'I must create a classical piece here,' or 'I must create a jazz piece here.' When I create music, I don't consider at all which genre I like best, but what the scene or the anime calls for, like a love [theme] or a mood. There isn't one genre I like more than the others. I find all of them satisfying and all inspire me in different ways.

Since she works in the animation industry, she receives only instructions and storyboards, which help her with composing. However, it is uncertain if all of her works are to be included in the finished project. She once said that this is a way she likes to work, for she does not have to deal with rules during composing. In reference to this, she once stated:

In my case, the creators talk to me and ask me to do a soundtrack a year or two before the animation is finished. At that time, I think of the plot in my brain, when the characters' names—everything about the characters—has not been decided yet. This is even when the title has not be decided yet.

She was the lead member of the project band Seatbelts, which regrouped in 2004 to compose the soundtrack for the PlayStation 2 Cowboy Bebop video game (released in Japan in 2005).

She has composed for Koei games released during the late 1980s to early 1990s and for Napple Tale, a Dreamcast game. Due to her close involvement in the Cowboy Bebop anime, the game released by Bandai also features her work.

Apart from anime and games, Kanno also composes for live-action films and television commercials. Some popular brands she has composed for are Canon, DoCoMo, Fuji Xerox, 7-Eleven, Microsoft, Nissan, Toyota, Shiseido, Avon and MasterCard to name a few. Her contributions to films started in the 1990s but since 2002 has there been a trend toward the medium, with some of the latter being shown in international film festivals.

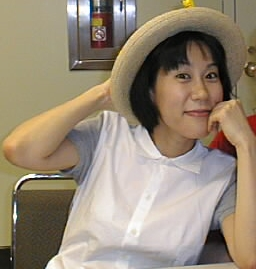
Kanno at Otakon 1999

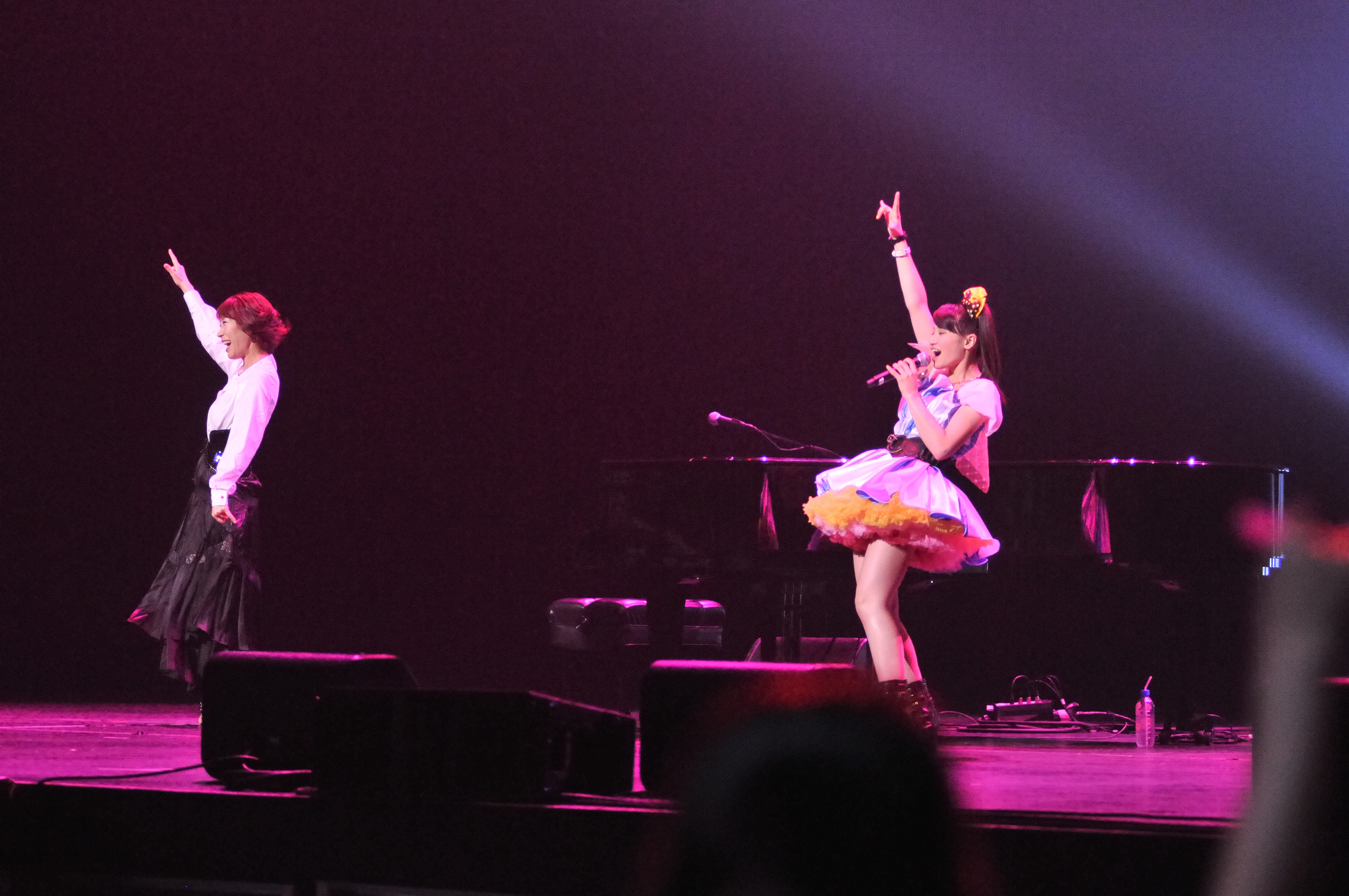
Yoko Kanno (left) with Megumi Nakajima performing at Anime Expo 2010

She attended Otakon and Anime Expo in 1999, as well as Anime Expo New York in 2002. In 2010, she made a surprise appearance at Anime Expo. Yoko Kanno performed her solo PianoMe concert at Otakon 2013.

She composed a three-movement suite, entitled "Ray of Water," for the ascension of Emperor Naruhito. It was performed for him and Empress Masako at the enthronement celebration on 9 November 2019. Yoshikazu Okada wrote the lyrics for the vocal portion, which was performed at the celebration by the idol group, Arashi.

=== Gabriela Robin ===
On many of Kanno's tracks, "Gabriela Robin" was credited as a lyricist and vocalist, but whenever these songs were performed in concert, either Maaya Sakamoto or Origa would perform them. In a 2009 written interview, Robin said that she would perform live for the first time at Kanno's 2009 Tanabata Sonic concert. However, at the end of the concert—which featured Kanno directing the Warsaw Philharmonic—Kanno turned to the audience and sang "Moon", a song previously attributed to Robin from the Turn A Gundam soundtrack, revealing that "Gabriela Robin" was simply a pseudonym Kanno used to write songs mixing English and Japanese freely. In a later interview, Kanno said she picked the name because the first orchestral recording she had heard was the Israel Philharmonic Orchestra, and at the time Yitzhak Rabin served as Israel's Prime Minister.

== Personal life ==
In addition to Japanese, she speaks a little English and some French, but she needs translation help to converse in French.

Commenting on spirituality and religion, Kanno has said:

I'm not religious at all. But Japanese don't believe in one God, but in gods everywhere in plants and animals. That's right. In Japan, Christianity has a wonderful image. People enjoy the image of Christ and Christianity in picture books, but not as a religion.

Kanno enjoys music, photography, and writing. She has penned several journals for Newtype magazine, accompanying her articles with her own photographs for illustrations. Additionally, a collection of photographs taken by Kanno of her protégé and former production partner, Maaya Sakamoto, was showcased in the special event program for Sakamoto's thirtieth birthday concert at Nippon Budokan in 2010.

In 2011, Yoko Kanno expressed her support for the victims of the 2011 Tōhoku earthquake and tsunami, composing a song titled "Kimi de Ite, Buji de Ite" (きみでいてぶじでいて, Stay With Me, Stay Safe). Later, she composed NHK's official support song on the occasion of the first anniversary of the earthquake entitled "Hana wa Saku" (花は咲く, Flowers Will Bloom), including lyrics by Sendai film director Shunji Iwai. The song features notable natives from the affected areas of Miyagi, Fukushima and Iwate.

== Discography ==
=== Studio albums ===
Date	Title	Notes
1 January 1998	Song to Fly	All songs composed and conducted by Yoko Kanno; track 8 performed by Yoko Kanno. (Tracks 1–7, 9–11 performed by Cosmic Voices from Bulgaria, Warsaw Philharmonic Orchestra, Warsaw Chorus, Tulivu-Donna Cumberbatch, Franco Sansalone, Krzysztof Ciupinsky, Steve Conte, Jadwiga Rappé and Gabriela Robin).
22 May 2002	23-Ji no Ongaku	All songs composed and conducted by Yoko Kanno. Vocals performed by Maaya Sakamoto. Album released by Victor Entertainment. The title translates as "11:00 pm music".
2 May 2008	CM Yoko	Compilation album of music for commercials done by Yoko Kanno over the years. All songs composed by Yoko Kanno.
22 April 2009	CM Yoko 2	Compilation album of music for commercials done by Yoko Kanno over the years. All songs composed and/or arranged by Yoko Kanno.
27 May 2009	Space Bio Charge	Compilation album of Yoko Kanno with Seatbelts.
8 June 2011	Yoko Kanno produce Cyber Bicci	Compilation album of previous works with Ilaria Graziano, along with new materials.

=== Other involvements ===
Artist	Album	Year	Role(s)
Tetsu 100%	Tokyo Taco Blues	1986	Composer for one track
Tetsu 100%	Tetsu 100%	1987	Composer for four tracks
Tetsu 100%	Ato3cm	1987	Composer for five tracks
Tetsu 100%	Jack in the Box	1988	Composer for three tracks
Tetsu 100%	Manatsu no Santa Claus	1988	Composer for one track
Tetsu 100%	Sunao	1989	Composition credited to band
Chiyono Yoshino	Montage	1988	Composer for two tracks
Chiyono Yoshino	Song Bird	1989	Composer for three tracks; arranger for two tracks
Chiyono Yoshino	Melanger	1990	Composer for one track; performer on two tracks
Keiko Nakajima	Keiko Nakajima	1990	Composer for four tracks
Kyoko Endo	Renai	1990	Arranger for seven tracks
Kyoko Endo	Kobitori ni Naritai	1993	Arranger for all tracks
Kyoko Endo	Fuyu no Miwa	1993	Arranger for all tracks
Kyoko Endo	Hashire Hashire	1999	Arranger for two tracks
Aki Okui	Lost Melodies	1994	Arranger for two tracks
Aki Okui	Straw Color	1997	Arranger for one track
Aki Okui	Tsuki no Mayu	2000	Composer for all tracks
Hitomi Mieno	Hajimari no Boukenshya-tachi; ~Hikari no Chizu~	1995	Composer for two tracks
Miki Imai	Love of my Life	1995	Arranger for four tracks
Miki Imai	Thank You	1996	Arranger for four tracks
Miki Imai	IMAI.MIKI from 1986	1998	Arranger for one track
Miki Imai	Blooming Ivory	2000	Arranger for one track
Yuri Shiratori	Atarashii Kutsu	1995	Composer for two tracks; lyricist for one track
Yuri Shiratori	Caramel Pop	1995	Composer and lyricist for two tracks
Samply Red	Perfect Rouge	1996	Composition credited to band
Samply Red	Ah-ra ii Kimochi	1996	Composition credited to band
Samply Red	Kiseki to Taitsuku	1996	Composition credited to band
Samply Red	Happy Go Lucky OST	1997	Composer for eight tracks
Samply Red	Kemeko no Uta (Happy Go Lucky)	1997	Arrangement credited to band
Samply Red	It's for my Ego	1997	Composition credited to band
Samply Red	Perfect Rouge I, II, III	2002	Composition credited to band
Kyōko Koizumi	Otokonoko, Onnanoko	1996	Composer for eight tracks; arranger for all tracks except 9
Kyōko Koizumi	For my Life (Single)	1999	Composer for two tracks
Maaya Sakamoto	Grapefruit	1997	Composer for all tracks
Maaya Sakamoto	DIVE	1998	Composer for all tracks
Maaya Sakamoto	Single Collection+ Hotchpotch	1999	Composer for all tracks
Maaya Sakamoto	Lucy	2001	Composer for all tracks
Maaya Sakamoto	Easy Listening	2001	Composer for all tracks
Maaya Sakamoto	Single Collection+ Nikopachi	2003	Composer for all tracks
Maaya Sakamoto	Shōnen Alice	2003	Composer for all tracks
Maaya Sakamoto	Kazeyomi	2009	Composer for two tracks
Maaya Sakamoto	You Can't Catch Me	2011	Composer for one track
Akino Arai	Sora No Mori	1997	Composer for five tracks
Akino Arai	Sora No Miwa	1997	Composer for two tracks
Akino Arai	Hiru No Tsuki	1998	Arranger for two tracks
Akino Arai	RGB	2002	Composer for one track
Yasui Inoue	Kyuu Dan	1998	Composer for one track
Crystal Kay	Eternal Memories	1999	Composer for two tracks
Crystal Kay	Komichi no Hana	1999	Composer for one track
Crystal Kay	C.C.L. Crystal Lover Light	2000	Composer for one track; arranger for one track
Kei Kobayashi	Nagashime Play	2003	Composer for all tracks
SMAP	Say What You Will	2005	Composer for two tracks
SMAP	super.modern.artistic.performance	2008	Composer for one track
Yukawa Shione	Yuki No Waltz	2007	Composer for one track
AKINO from bless4	Lost in Time	2007	Composer for all tracks
Chitose Hajime	Cassini	2008	Composer for one track
Origa	The Songwreath	2008	Composer for one track
Yoshika	World	2008	Composer for one track
May'n	May'n☆Street	2009	Composer for two tracks
Natsumi Kiyoura	Juuku Iro	2010	Composer for one track
Megumi Nakajima	Be with You	2012	Composer for one track
Clammbon	yet	2015	String arranger for one track

== Works ==
=== Anime ===
Year	Title	Role(s)
1992	Porco Rosso	Ending theme song arranger
1994	Please Save My Earth	Composer (other tracks by Hajime Mizoguchi)
1994	Macross Plus	Composer
1995	Memories: Magnetic Rose	Composer
1996	The Vision of Escaflowne	Composer (other tracks by Hajime Mizoguchi)
1996	X Clamp Character File	Composer (other tracks by various others)
1997	Clamp School Detectives	Second ending theme song composer
1997	Noiseman Sound Insect	Composer
1998	Record of Lodoss War: Chronicles of the Heroic Knight	Opening theme song composer
1998	Macross Dynamite 7	Insert song composer
1998	Cowboy Bebop	Composer
1998	Cardcaptor Sakura	Third opening theme song composer
1998	Brain Powerd	Composer
1999	Turn A Gundam	Composer
1999	Jin-Roh	Pianist
1999	Neo Tokyo	Composer
2000	Escaflowne	Composer (other tracks by Hajime Mizoguchi)
2001	Earth Maiden Arjuna	Composer
2001	Cowboy Bebop: Knockin' on Heaven's Door	Composer
2002	RahXephon	Opening theme song composer
2002	Ghost in the Shell: Stand Alone Complex	Composer
2003	Wolf's Rain	Composer
2004	Ghost in the Shell: Stand Alone Complex 2nd GIG	Composer
2005	Genesis of Aquarion	Composer (other tracks by Hogari Hisaaki)
2006	Ōban Star-Racers	Opening and ending theme song composer
2006	Ghost in the Shell: Stand Alone Complex – Solid State Society	Composer
2007	Darker than Black: Kuro no Keiyakusha	Composer
2007	Genius Party	Insert song composer
2007	Genesis of Aquarion	Composer
2008	Macross Frontier	Composer
2009	Ring of Gundam	Composer
2012	Aquarion Evol	Composer
2012	Code Geass: Akito the Exiled	Theme song composer
2012	Kids on the Slope	Composer
2014	Space☆Dandy	Composer; Ending theme song arranger; (other tracks by various others)
2014	Terror in Resonance	Composer
2015	Aquarion Logos	Opening theme song composer
2021	Macross Frontier Film Short: Labyrinth of Time	Theme song composer
2023	Spy × Family Season 2	Opening theme song arranger

=== Video games ===
Year	Title	Original system(s)	Role(s)
1985	Romance of the Three Kingdoms	PC-8801, Sharp X1, FM-7	Composer
1986	Nobunaga's Ambition Zenkokuban	PC-8801, PC-9801	Composer
1987	Genghis Khan	PC-8801, PC-9801	Composer
1988	Nobunaga's Ambition Sengoku Gunyūden	PC-8801, PC-9801	Composer
1989	Ishin no Arashi	PC-9801	Composer
1990	Uncharted Waters	PC-8801, PC-9801	Composer
1990	Nobunaga's Ambition Bushō Fuunroku	PC-9801	Composer
1992	Nobunaga's Ambition Haōden	PC-9801	Composer
1993	Uncharted Waters 2: New Horizons	PC-9801	Composer
1994	Nobunaga's Ambition Tenshōki	PC-9801	Composer
2000	Napple Tale: Arsia in Daydream	Dreamcast	Composer
2005	Cowboy Bebop: Tsuitou no Yakyoku	PlayStation 2	Composer
2007	Ragnarok Online 2	MS Windows	Composer
2011	Continent of the Ninth	MS Windows	Theme song composer
2012	Ragnarok Online 2: Legend of the Second	MS Windows	Composer
2018	Starwing Paradox	Arcade	Theme song composer
2023	Volzerk: Monsters and Lands Unknown	MS Windows, iOS, Android	Composer

=== Television dramas ===
Year	Title	Role(s)
2001	Yo ni mo Kimyou na Monogatari – Mama Shinhatsubai	Composer
2002	Mayonaka Betsu no Kao	Composer
2004	X'smap~Tora to Raion to Gojin no Otoko~	Composer
2006	Chichi ni Kanaderu Merodi	Composer
2008	Camouflage	Composer
2009	Kaze ni Mai Agaru Vinyl Sheet	Composer
2013	Gochisōsan	Composer
2017	Naotora: The Lady Warlord	Composer
2021	Cowboy Bebop	Composer
2023	The Makanai: Cooking for the Maiko House	Composer

=== Movies ===
Year	Title	Role(s)
1994	Yamato Takeru	Composer
1996	Asalto	Composer
1996	Boku wa Benkyo ga Dekinai	Composer
1997	Natsu Jikan no Otonatachi	Composer
2002	Tokyo.sora	Composer
2002	Woman of Water	Composer
2003	03 +	Composer
2004	Kamikaze Girls	Composer
2005	Ashura	Composer
2005	Su-ki-da	Composer
2006	Honey and Clover	Composer
2007	The Show Must Go On	Composer
2007	Say Hello!	Composer
2010	Surely Someday	Composer
2013	Petal Dance	Composer
2015	Our Little Sister	Composer

=== Publicly commissioned works ===
Year	Title	Occasion	Role(s)
2019	"Ray of Water"	Enthronement of Naruhito	Composer

=== Commercial music ===
Companies that have commissioned Kanno for commercial music include:

- AEON
- AGF Maxim
- Ajinomoto
- Asahi Glass Co.
- Avon
- Cafe Noevir
- Citizen Watch Co.
- Canon
- Cosmo Oil
- Daikin
- Daio Paper
- Daiwa House
- FamilyMart
- Fancl
- Fuji Xerox
- Fujitsu
- Google
- Glico
- Gravity
- Half Century More
- Haus Ten Bausch
- Hisamitsu
- Hitachi
- House
- IBM
- J-Phone
- Japan Medical Association
- Japan Railways
- Japan Telecom
- Kanebo
- KDDI
- Kincho
- Kirin Beverage
- Kubota
- MasterCard International
- Meiji
- Microsoft
- Mister Donut
- Mitsubishi Heavy Industries
- Mitsui Home
- Morinaga
- Nagatanien
- National Ionity Nanocare
- Nikon
- Nintendo
- Nissan
- NTT DoCoMo
- Ono Pharmaceutical
- Otsuka Pharmaceutical Co.
- Pioneer
- Platinum Guild International
- Pola
- Seiko Epson
- Sekisui House
- Seven Eleven
- Sharp
- Shimura
- Shiseido
- Sony
- Suntory
- Taiyo Life Insurance
- Takano Yori Beauty Clinic
- Tepco
- Tirol-Choco
- Tokyo Gas
- Tokyo Metro
- Tombow Pencil
- Toyota
- Try Group
- UFJ Bank
- Vodafone
- Yukiguni Maitake

== Hired vocalists ==
Artists who have performed at least one of Kanno's vocal tracks:

- Aceilux
- Afra
- Aimer
- AKINO
- Akino Arai
- Pierre Bensusan
- Hanna Berglind
- Emily Bindiger
- Hassan Bohmide
- Donna Burke
- Hajime Chitose
- Steve Conte
- Cosmic Voices from Bulgaria
- Crystal Kay
- Tulivu-Donna Cumberbatch
- Emily Curtis
- Arnór Dan
- Ben del Maestro
- Kyoko Endo
- Masaaki Endoh
- Feather and Down
- Masayoshi Furukawa
- Ilaria Graziano
- Motohiro Hata
- Heartsdales
- Reynada Hill
- Mari Iijima
- Miki Imai
- Yuho Iwasato
- Seika Iwashita
- Tim Jensen
- Joyce
- Tokiko Kato
- Kyoko Katsunuma
- Kei Kobayashi
- Kyōko Koizumi
- Scott Matthew
- May'n
- Hitomi Mieno
- Chris Mosdell
- Maryanne Murray
- Ryo Nagano
- Mem Nahadr
- Megumi Nakajima
- Kaoru Nishino
- Aki Okui
- Egil Olsen
- Origa
- Soichiro Otsuka
- Yuuki Ozaki
- POP ETC
- Raiché Coutev Sisters
- Raj Ramayya
- Jadwiga Rappé
- Maaya Sakamoto
- Franco Sansalone
- Shanti Snyder
- Artur Stefanowicz
- Aoi Teshima
- Sydney Thiam
- Anna Tsuchiya
- Carla Vallet
- James Wendt
- WISE
- Wuyontana
- Etsuko Yakushimaru
- Chinatsu Yamamoto
- Mai Yamane
- YOSHIKA
- Chiyono Yoshino
- Makino Yui
- YUKI
