= RGB (album) =

Collection "RGB"

Compilation album by Akino Arai
- Released: April 24, 2002
- Genre: J-pop
- Length: 69:55
- Label: Victor Entertainment
- Producer: Akino Arai

Akino Arai chronology
Kouseki Radio (2001)	Collection "RGB" (2002)	Eden (2004)

RGB is a collection album by Akino Arai. It contains several singles and b-sides previously unreleased on an album.

== Track listing ==
1. "昼の月"
  (Hiru no Tsuki, The Moon at Noon) - First ending theme of Outlaw Star
2. "さかさまの虹"
  (Sakasama no Niji, Inverted Rainbow)
3. "Little Wing"
4. "黒い種"
  (Kuroi Tane, Black Seed)
5. "月の家"
  (Tsuki no Ie, The House of the Moon) - Second ending theme of Outlaw Star
6. "ばらの茂み"
  (Bara no Shigemi, Rose Bush)
7. "星の木馬"
  (Hoshi no Mokuba, Rocking Horse of the Stars)
8. "叶えて"
  (Kanaete, Grant My Wish)
9. "祝祭の前(RGB mix)"
  (Shukusai no Mae (RGB mix), Before the Celebration Festival ~RGB Mix~)
10. "花のかたち"
  (Hana no Katachi, Shape of a Flower)
11. "フォロー・ミー"
  (Foro mii, Follow Me)
12. "きれいな感情"
  (Kirei na Kanjou, Beautiful Emotions) - Ending theme of Noir (anime)
13. "空の青さ"
  (Sora no Aosa, The Blueness of the Sky)
14. "白昼夢"
  (Hakuchuumu, Daydream)
