= Deb Lyons =

American singer-songwriter

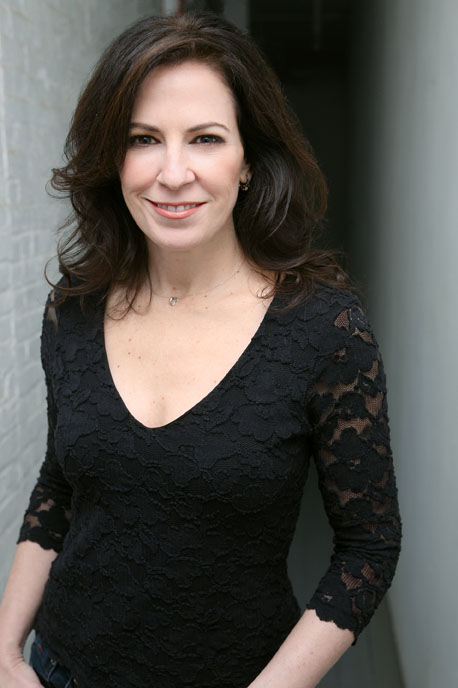
- Deb Lyons in May 2008

Background information
- Genre: Musicals
- Occupations: Singer, songwriter
- Website: www.deblyonsmusic.com

Deb Lyons is an American singer-songwriter from New York City. She is most associated with her work on Broadway, and is well-recognized for her multiple performances in clubs such as The Bitter End and The Bottom Line.

Lyons has recorded with acclaimed composer Yuki Kajiura on the album Fiction, as well as several songs (including the image theme) for the video game Xenosaga Episode II. Through remixes, her voice has appeared in Xenosaga Episode III. She has sung on jingles for Toyota, JetBlue, Milky Way, and is the voice of several Fisher Price toys. In addition, Lyons has recorded with The Chieftains (Further Down the Old Plank Road) and children's artists Yosi Levin and Mr. Scott the Music Man.

Other people Lyons has performed and recorded with include Donna Summer, The Mamas & the Papas, Lee Ann Womack, Rosanne Cash, Carrie Underwood, Emily Bindiger, Carolee Goodgold, Jim Barbaro, Margaret Dorn, Bingoboys, Gigi on the Beach, and the Ed Palermo Big Band.

Lyons has been in several stage productions, including a national tour of Jekyll & Hyde, and Smokey Joe's Cafe on Broadway and West End of London and regional productions of Hairspray, Side by Side by Sondheim, and Pump Boys and Dinettes.
