= Sora no Niwa =

Studio album by Akino Arai
- Released: October 22, 1997
- Genre: J-pop
- Length: 44:58
- Label: Victor Entertainment

Akino Arai chronology
Sora no Mori (1997)	Sora no Niwa (1997)	Furu Platinum (2000)

Sora no Niwa (そらの庭) is Akino Arai's third official album release.

== Track listing ==
1. "Reincarnation"
2. "小鳥の巣"
  (Kotori no Su, Bird Nest)
3. "空から吹く風"
  (Sora Kara Fuku Kaze, The Gusting Wind from the Sky)
4. "仔猫の心臓"
  (Koneko no Shinzou, The Kitten's Heart)
5. "OMATSURI"
  (Festival)
6. "アトムの光"
  (ATOMU no Hikari, Atom of Light)
7. "Black Shell"
8. "Solitude"
9. "妖精の死"
  (Yousei no Shi, The Faerie's Death)
10. "人間の子供"
  (Ningen no Kodomo, A Human Child)
11. "Little Edie"
