= Natsukashii Mirai =

Studio album by Akino Arai
- Released: November 21, 1986
- Genre: J-pop
- Length: 42:09
- Label: Victor Entertainment

Akino Arai chronology
Natsukashii Mirai (1986)	Sora no Mori (1997)

Natsukashii Mirai (懐かしい未来) is the first studio album by Akino Arai. It was released in 1986 by Victor Entertainment.

== Track listing ==
1. "Ring Ring"
2. "月よ凍れ"
  (Tsuki yo Kōre)
3. "金色の目"
  (Kiniro no Me, Golden Eyes)
4. "地図をゆく雲"
  (Chizu wo Yuku Kumo)
5. "美しい星"
  (Utsukushii Hoshi, Beautiful Star)
6. "1999"
7. "約束"
  (Yakusoku, Promise)
8. "ロゼ"・ルージュ
  (Roze Rūju, ROSE ROUGE)
9. "Sky Lounge"
