= Lucy (Maaya Sakamoto album) =

Studio album by Maaya Sakamoto
- Released: March 28, 2001
- Studio: Victor Studio; SoundCity Studio; Sunrise Towerside Studio; Metoropolis Studio; Air Studio
- Genre: J-pop; pop rock; alternative pop
- Length: 59:44
- Language: Japanese
- Label: Victor Entertainment
- Producer: Yoko Kanno

Maaya Sakamoto chronology
Single Collection+ Hotchpotch (1999)	Lucy (2001)	Easy Listening (2001)

Singles from Lucy
- 1. "Mameshiba" Released: December 16, 2000

Lucy is the third studio album by Japanese voice actress and singer Maaya Sakamoto, released on March 28, 2001, by Victor Entertainment.

== Background and release ==
Following the release of Hotchpotch, Sakamoto decided to prioritize her education, and paused her work to focus on college entrance exams. During this period, her brother also suffered severe injuries from a traffic accident—and the daily rehab sessions she witnessed—prompted her to question whether she should stay in entertainment, as it made her wonder if her work truly had a meaningful impact on people's lives. Sakamoto then viewed acting and singing as inherently undefined, lacking clear answers or specific goals. Upon resuming work, however, she found it enjoyable and realized she was not suited for any other profession. She noted that, outside her career, she had no particularly standout qualities. The first song she was commissioned to work on after this long break was "Mameshiba," which she found enjoyable and reaffirmed her love for her job. During the creation of the album, Sakamoto spent extensive time in the studio, despite attending school daily. She commented that since entering college, previous time limits such as her youth theatrical group involvement, were no longer there, allowing her to stay as late as desired and become more immersed in the production process. In total, seven of the twelve tracks feature lyrics written by Sakamoto herself.

The album title Lucy derived from Sakamoto's idea of a proper name for the universal girlish side of everyone. Sakamoto later reflected that, although she was unaware of it at the time, the album marked her first conscious exploration of femininity. Entering college had allowed her to relax and loosen up, in contrast to her somewhat depressed teenage years. She commented: "I couldn’t tell, since I saw myself in the mirror every day, but I think that change to being more womanly took a bigger part of the stage. In my mind, my slightly fuzzy, somewhat depressed teenage years had opened up a little into a more enjoyable time when I was looser about a lot of things, and I was more content with letting things go as they were. I feel like that side of me came through even in my music."

In retrospective, Sakamoto defined Lucy as her album reflecting herself in her twenties, marking a shift from "feeling melancholy for no reason" to a more carefree "oh well" attitude. Whereas her earlier songs had tended to turn inward, this album began to project outward, bringing her a sense of liberation. She described it as the start of a lighter, more easygoing version of herself.

== Critical reception ==
In a review on Amazon Japan, Keiichi Okabe praised the record's unified band-oriented backing tracks, which draw on acoustic guitar and piano foundations alongside arrangements evoking 1960s–70s UK pop influences. Okabe highlighted the "outstanding compatibility" between these elements and Sakamoto's increasingly polished, ear-pleasing vocals, describing the overall result as "refreshing yet brisk high-quality pop" that delivers an enjoyable listening experience.

Writing for Mikiki by Tower Records, music writer Hajime Kitano described Lucy as a record "centered on acoustic tones with a striking increase in vibrancy", and also praised Sakamoto's writing skills, in particular highlighting the line "Spit out love from your pitch-black lungs" from "Alkaloid."

== Commercial performance ==
Lucy debuted at number 16 on the Oricon Weekly Albums chart, selling 28,530 copies on its first week. The album charted for four weeks, with reported sales totaling 43,080 copies.

== Track listing ==
All music is composed by Yoko Kanno.

Lucy track listing
No.	Title	Lyrics	Length
1.	"Lucy" (Instrumental)		1:45
2.	"Mameshiba" (マメシバ, lit. 'Little Shiba dog')	Maaya Sakamoto	6:09
3.	"Strobe no Sora" (ストロボの空, lit. 'Strobe Sky')	Sakamoto	5:03
4.	"Alkaloid" (アルカロイド)	Sakamoto	4:12
5.	"Kōcha" (紅茶, lit. 'Black Tea')	Sakamoto	5:33
6.	"Kinobori to Akai Skirt" (木登りと赤いスカート, lit. 'Tree-climbing and a Red Skirt')	Yuho Iwasato	5:37
7.	"Life Is Good"	Tim Jensen	4:15
8.	"Honey Bunny"	Sakamoto	5:11
9.	"T-Shirt" (Tシャツ)	Sakamoto	6:16
10.	"Kūki to Hoshi" (空気と星, lit. 'The Air and the Stars')	Iwasato	5:22
11.	"Rule: Iro Asenai Hibi" (Rule〜色褪せない日々〜, lit. 'Rule: Unfading Days')	Iwasato	5:31
12.	"Watashi wa Oka no Ue Kara Kabin o Nageru" (私は丘の上から花瓶を投げる, lit. 'I Throw a Vase from the Hilltop')	Sakamoto	4:45
Total length:			59:44

== Personnel ==
Credits adapted from the liner notes of Lucy.

- Maaya Sakamoto – vocals, backing vocals, whistling
- Yoko Kanno – songwriting, arrangements, acoustic piano, keyboards, sound production
- Chinatsu Yamamoto – background voice
- Yasuo Sano – drums
- Hitoshi Watanabe – bass
- Bakabon Suzuki – bass
- Tsuneo Imahori – guitars
- Keishi Urata – synthesizer manipulation
- Seiichi Takubo – synthesizer manipulation assistant
- Naruyoshi Kikuchi – saxophone
- Masatsugu Shinozaki Strings – strings
- Gavyn Wright Strings – strings
- Masashi Yabuhara – recording, mixing engineer
- Miyuki Umeda – assistant engineer
- Sheela-e – assistant engineer
- Masaho Takeda – assistant engineer
- Seiji Sekine – assistant engineer
- Nik Pugh – assistant engineer
- Nick Wollage – assistant engineer
- Ted Jensen – mastering
- Toshiaki Ota – recording coordinator
- Elle Kawano – recording coordinator
- Cherry Kaoru Hulsey – recording coordinator
- Yukako Kate Inoue – director
- Shiro Sasaki – executive producer

== Charts ==
Chart performance for Lucy
Chart (2001)	Peak position
Japanese Albums (Oricon)	16
