= Napple Tale: Arsia in Daydream =

2000 video game

Napple Tale
- Japanese Dreamcast cover art
- Developer: Chime
- Publisher: Sega
- Composer: Yoko Kanno
- Platform: Dreamcast
- Release: JP: October 19, 2000
- Genre: Platform
- Mode: Single-player

Napple Tale: Arsia in Daydream (ナップルテール アリシア イン デイドリーム), more commonly called simply Napple Tale, is a 2.5D platform game for the Sega Dreamcast, released on October 19, 2000 in Japan. It is notable for cultivating a "feminine sensibility" in its design by employing primarily women for its creative staff. An unofficial English translation patch was released in 2019.

== Story ==
While enjoying the once-per-year Summer Festival, the heroine Porch Arsia is accidentally brought to Napple World due to a mistake made by Straynap, a novice Spirit Guide who leads souls into the afterlife. Napple World, known as the land of daydreams, lies between the Real World and the Deep Dream, where souls go to rest. The concept of time in Napple World is unlike the real world: the seasons of spring, summer, autumn and winter exist separately from each other as distinct locations. When Porch arrives in Napple World, six fairy-like beings called Petals leave her body and escape into the seasons, and she must retrieve them in order to go home again. To make up for his mistake, Straynap becomes Porch's guide and instructs her throughout the game, explaining the often contradictory nature of Napple World to her.

== Gameplay ==
The gameplay of Napple Tale takes place in two distinct sections. Similar to Sonic Adventure, there is a fully 3D hub where Porch can interact with the townspeople. The citizens of Napple Town have an assortment of problems (approximately seventy) with which Porch must help them. Tasks range from building a house to helping two friends stop fighting with each other.

The levels extend from the Napple Town hub level, and correspond to the seasons. They contain a fixed path with a boss at the end. The enemies encountered along the way sometimes drop recipe pieces or random items. The recipes show four items which, if combined, will create a Paffet. Porch wields a racket-like weapon which she swings to battle foes. She can double-jump and attack to perform a spinning attack. Health is designated with petals and by finding certain items you can increase your maximum health. Each time Porch falls into a hole or gets attacked she loses half of a petal.

== Characters ==
Arsia Porch - The protagonist. Straynap brings her to Napple World by mistake after confusing her with his actual target, a cat named Pochi. She defeats enemies using a key-shaped weapon. Her goal is to return to the real world.

Straynap - Nicknamed "SN" by Porch. A novice Spirit Guide who also runs an ice cream shop called 13 Ice. He advises Porch and teaches her about the dreamworld.

Piero - A jester and self-proclaimed hedonist who oversees an initial gameplay tutorial for Porch. He has many secrets.

Frogcar - Frogcar is the mayor of Napple Town. He is half frog and half car (hence the name). He has a large house, where he holds meetings to discuss all sorts of problems in Napple Town.

Lewis - Lewis lives in the Summer side of Napple Town and is best friends with Oliver until he is seduced by a sea spirit.

Murray - Murray owns the Hatena store in the Winter side of Napple Town. Porch has a crush on him, and he is very friendly to everybody, as shown by how he likes to give gifts to Porch and others.

Oliver - Oliver lives in the Winter side of Napple Town and is best friends with Lewis.

== Paffets ==
There are two types of Paffets. Some Paffets go to the Paffet Collection Room below 13 Ice and others go to various places in town. The Paffets that go to random places in Napple Town are usually structures or appliances (street lamps, balconies, stoves, etc.). The Paffets that go to the Paffet Room are mostly animal- or plant-based. A maximum of five can be carried at any one time and they have limited numbers of uses before they return to the Paffet Room. Items dropped by some enemies will raise the number of uses if it is below the starting value. The Paffets that can be carried perform useful functions in Napple Town or in stages such as becoming trampolines or unleashing powerful attacks. There are 71 Paffets total: 28 that go to the Paffet Room and 43 that go to random places in the town.

== Music ==
One of the most noted aspects of the game is the music written by well-known game and anime composer, Yoko Kanno. In addition, the vocal tracks were performed by her frequent collaborator, Maaya Sakamoto, with lyrics for one of the songs by Chris Mosdell.

Little Black Book (Track #21) by Yoko Kanno was also included in the soundtrack of the German movie Cherry Blossoms - Hanami from 2008 (as Track #3).
