= Kosmochlor =

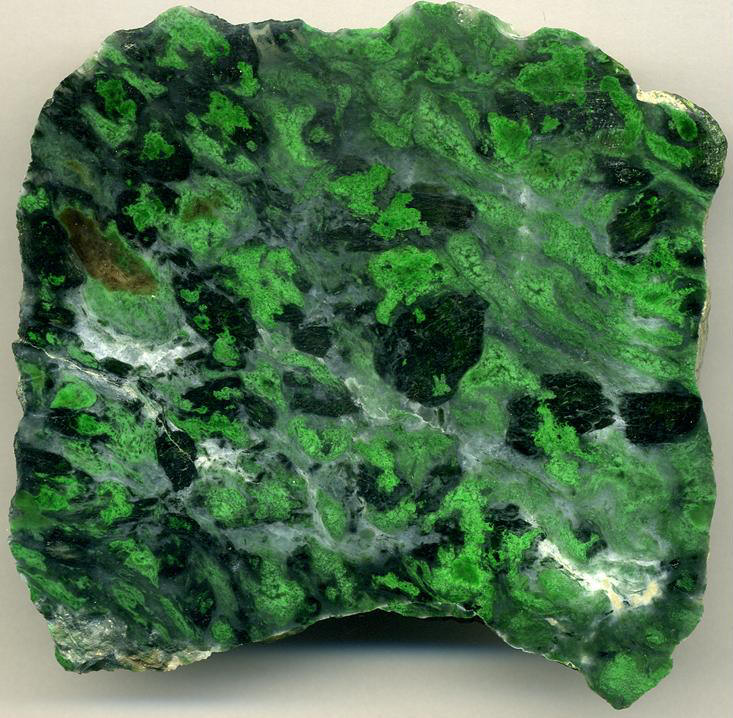
- Chromite (metallic black), kosmochlor pyroxene (emerald green to dark green to black), chromian jadeite pyroxene (green), chromiferous arfvedsonite amphibole (green or gray), symplectite (green, a finely-crystalline mineral mix of mostly chromian jadeite)

General
- Category: Inosilicate mineral
- Formula: NaCr^{3+}Si_{2}O_{6}7
- IMA symbol: Kos
- Strunz classification: 9.DA.25
- Crystal system: Monoclinic
- Crystal class: Prismatic (2/m) (same H-M symbol)
- Space group: C2/c
- Unit cell: a = 9.57, b = 8.71 c = 5.26 Å; β = 107.49°; Z = 4

Identification
- Color: Emerald-green
- Crystal habit: Prismatic crystals and fibrous aggregates
- Twinning: Simple, lamellar on {100} and {001}
- Cleavage: Good on {110} parting on {001}
- Mohs scale hardness: 6
- Luster: Vitreous
- Streak: Light green
- Diaphaneity: Semitransparent
- Specific gravity: 3.51-3.60
- Optical properties: Biaxial (-)
- Refractive index: n_{α} = 1.766 n_{γ} = 1.781
- Birefringence: δ = 0.015
- Pleochroism: X = yellowish green; Y = blue-green, grass-green; Z = emerald-green
- Dispersion: r > v

Kosmochlor is a rare chromium sodium clinopyroxene with the chemical formula NaCr^{3+}Si_{2}O_{6}.

The name is from German kosmisch, for its occurrence in meteorites, and the Greek chlor, for green. It was first reported in 1897 from the Toluca meteorite, Jiquipilco, Mexico.

It occurs as a major constituent of some jadeitites and as an accessory mineral of some iron meteorites. Associated minerals include cliftonite (graphite), chromian diopside, troilite at Toluca; daubreelite, krinovite, roedderite, high albite, richterite, chromite (Canyon Diablo); and jadeite, chromite and chlorite (Burma).
