= Graphene production techniques =

Methods to make single-atom-thick carbon sheets

A rapidly increasing list of graphene production techniques have been developed to enable graphene's use in commercial applications.

Isolated 2D crystals cannot be grown via chemical synthesis beyond small sizes even in principle, because the rapid growth of phonon density with increasing lateral size forces 2D crystallites to bend into the third dimension. However, other routes to 2D materials exist:

Fundamental forces place seemingly insurmountable barriers in the way of creating [2D crystals]... The nascent 2D crystallites try to minimize their surface energy and inevitably morph into one of the rich variety of stable 3D structures that occur in soot. But there is a way around the problem. Interactions with 3D structures stabilize 2D crystals during growth. So one can make 2D crystals sandwiched between or placed on top of the atomic planes of a bulk crystal. In that respect, graphene already exists within graphite... One can then hope to fool Nature and extract single-atom-thick crystallites at a low enough temperature that they remain in the quenched state prescribed by the original higher-temperature 3D growth.

The early approaches of cleaving multi-layer graphite into single layers or growing it epitaxially by depositing a layer of carbon onto another material have been supplemented by numerous alternatives. In all cases, the graphene must bond to some substrate to retain its 2d shape.

== Exfoliation ==
As of 2014 exfoliation produced graphene with the lowest number of defects and highest electron mobility.

=== Adhesive tape ===
Andre Geim and Konstantin Novoselov initially used adhesive tape to split graphite into graphene. Achieving single layers typically requires multiple exfoliation steps, each producing a slice with fewer layers, until only one remains. After exfoliation the flakes are deposited on a silicon wafer. Crystallites larger than 1 mm and visible to the naked eye can be obtained.

=== Robotic pixel assembly of van der Waals solids ===
Robotic pixel assembly method for manufacturing vdW solids provides high-speed and controllable design (area, geometry, and angle). In this approach, robotic assembly of prepatterned 'pixels' made from atomically thin two-dimensional components forms heterojunction devices. In the first implementation of this approach, the process takes place within a high-vacuum environment to allow clean interfaces.

=== Wedge-based ===
In this method, a sharp single-crystal diamond wedge penetrates onto the graphite source to exfoliate layers. This method uses highly ordered pyrolytic graphite (HOPG) as the starting material. The experiments were supported by molecular dynamic simulations.

=== Graphite oxide reduction ===
P. Boehm reported producing monolayer flakes of reduced graphene oxide in 1962. Rapid heating of graphite oxide and exfoliation yields highly dispersed carbon powder with a few percent of graphene flakes. Reduction of graphite oxide monolayer films, e.g. by hydrazine with annealing in argon/hydrogen also yielded graphene films. Later the oxidation protocol was enhanced to yield graphene oxide with an almost intact carbon framework that allows efficient removal of functional groups, neither of which was originally possible. The measured charge carrier mobility exceeded 1,000 centimetres (393.70 in)/Vs. Spectroscopic analysis of reduced graphene oxide has been conducted.

=== Liquid phase exfoliation: Shearing ===
In 2014 defect-free, unoxidized graphene-containing liquids were made from graphite using mixers that produce local shear rates greater than 10×10^{4} s-1. The method was claimed to be applicable to other 2D materials, including boron nitride, Molybdenum disulfide and other layered crystals. The liquid phase shear technique with the aid of surfactant is more suitable for pristine graphene exfoliation at room temperature and avoiding multi-step preparation.

=== Liquid Phase Exfoliation: Sonication ===
==== Solvent-aided ====
Dispersing graphite in a proper liquid medium can produce graphene by sonication in a process known as liquid phase exfoliation. Graphene is separated from graphite by centrifugation, producing graphene concentrations initially up to 0.01 mg/ml in N-methylpyrrolidone (NMP) and later to 2.1 mg/ml in NMP. Using a suitable ionic liquid as the dispersing liquid medium produced concentrations of 5.33 mg/ml. Graphene concentration produced by this method can be low, probably because of the large energy required to fragment the crystal during sonication.

Adding a surfactant to a solvent prior to sonication prevents restacking by adsorbing to the graphene's surface. This allows the production of aqueous suspensions, but removing the surfactant requires chemical treatments.

==== Immiscible liquids ====
Sonicating graphite at the interface of two immiscible liquids, most notably heptane and water, produced macro-scale graphene films. The graphene sheets are adsorbed to the high energy interface between the heptane and the water, where they are kept from restacking. The graphene remained at the interface even when exposed to force in excess of 300,000 g. The solvents may then be evaporated. The sheets are up to ~95% transparent and conductive.

=== Molten salts ===
Graphite particles can be corroded in molten salts to form a variety of carbon nanostructures including graphene. Hydrogen cations, dissolved in molten Lithium chloride, can be discharged on cathodically polarized graphite rods, which then intercalate into the graphite structure, peeling graphite to produce graphene. The graphene nanosheets produced displayed a single-crystalline structure with a lateral size of several hundred nanometers and a high degree of crystallinity and thermal stability.

=== Electrochemical synthesis ===
Electrochemical synthesis can exfoliate graphene. Varying a pulsed voltage controls thickness, flake area, number of defects and affects its properties. The process begins by bathing the graphite in a solvent for intercalation. The process can be tracked by monitoring the solution's transparency with an LED and photodiode.

== Laser-Induced Graphene (LIG) ==
In 2014, a laser-based single-step scalable approach to graphene production was published by Professor James M. Tour's Research Group at Rice University. The technique directly converts the surface of commercial polymer films into porous three-dimensional graphene patterns, using a CO_{2} infrared laser. The sp^{3}-carbon atoms were photothermally converted to sp^{2}-carbon atoms by pulsed laser irradiation. The resulting material exhibits high electrical conductivity, and has been demonstrated in a variety of applications, including interdigitated electrodes for in-plane microsupercapacitors with specific capacitances of >4 mF cm^{−2} and power densities of ~9 mW cm^{−2}. Laser-induced production of graphene is compatible with roll-to-roll manufacturing processes, and provides a highly-accessible route to flexible electronics, functional nanocomposites, and advanced energy storage devices. Furthermore, the technique has been extended to a wide variety of carbon sources, such as wood, paper, and cloth, and likewise, other wavelengths of lasers were also demonstrated to form graphene.

== Laser-Induced Graphene Fibers (LIGF) and Laser-Induced Graphene Scrolls (LIGS) ==
In 2018, Professor James M. Tour's Research Group at Rice University published the synthesis of Laser-Induced Graphene Fibers and Laser-Induced Graphene Scrolls. The new morphologies, which were accessible through tuning of laser parameters, found applications in areas such as air filtration and functional nanocomposites.

== Flash Joule Heating ==
In 2019, flash Joule heating (transient high-temperature electrothermal heating) was discovered to be a method to synthesize turbostratic graphene in bulk powder form. The method involves electrothermally converting various carbon sources, such as carbon black, coal, and food waste into micron-scale flakes of graphene. More recent works demonstrated the use of mixed plastic waste, waste rubber tires, and pyrolysis ash as carbon feedstocks. The graphenization process is kinetically controlled, and the energy dose is chosen to preserve the carbon in its graphenic state (excessive energy input leads to subsequent graphitization through annealing).

== Hydrothermal self-assembly ==
Graphene has been prepared by using a sugar (e.g. glucose, fructose, etc.) This substrate-free "bottom-up" synthesis is safer, simpler and more environmentally friendly than exfoliation. The method can control thickness, ranging from monolayer to multilayers.

== Epitaxy ==
Epitaxy refers to the deposition of a crystalline overlayer on a crystalline substrate, where there is registry between the two. In some cases epitaxial graphene layers are coupled to surfaces weakly enough (by Van der Waals forces) to retain the two dimensional electronic band structure of isolated graphene. An example of this weak coupling is epitaxial graphene on SiC and on Pt(111). On the other hand, the epitaxial graphene layer on some metals can be strongly bonded to the surface with covalent bonds. The properties of the covalently bonded graphene can differ from the ones of free-standing graphene. An example of this strong coupling is epitaxial graphene on Ru(0001). However, the coupling is strong only for the first graphene layer on Ru(0001): the second layer is more weakly coupled to the first layer and has already properties very close to the free standing graphene.

=== Chemical vapor deposition ===
Chemical vapor deposition (CVD) is a common form of epitaxy. The process of deposition of solid material onto a heated substrate through decomposition or chemical reaction of compounds contained in the gas passing over the substrate is called chemical vapor deposition. The reactants, generally in the gaseous or vapor phase, react on or near the surface of the substrates, which are at some elevated temperature. The subsequent reaction results in the deposition of atoms or molecules on the entire substrate surface. CVD processes are also widely used for growing epitaxial layers such as a silicon epitaxial layer on a single-crystal silicon substrate (homoepitaxy or commonly referred to as epitaxy) or epitaxial layer deposition on a sapphire (Heteroepitaxy). A special method in CVD, called Epitaxy or Epitaxial Layer Deposition or Vapor-Phase Epitaxy (VPE), has only a single-crystal form as the deposited layer. This process is usually carried out for certain combinations of substrate and layer materials and under special deposition conditions.

== Epitaxy of graphene ==
Epitaxial graphene films can be grown on various crystalline surfaces. The atomic lattice of the substrate facilitate in orientationally registering the carbon atoms of the graphene layer. The chemical interaction of the graphene with the substrate can vary from weak to strong. This also modifies the properties of the graphene layer. The need for epitaxial graphene arises from the challenges of incorporating carbon nanotubes in large-scale integrated electronic architectures. Research on 2D graphene was thus initiated by experiments on epitaxially grown graphene on single crystal silicon carbide. While significant control has been in growing and characterizing epitaxial graphene, challenges remain in being able to fully exploit the potential of these structures. The promise lies in the hope that charge carriers on these graphene structures, like carbon nanotubes, remain ballistic. If so, it could revolutionize the world of electronics.

=== Silicon carbide ===
Heating silicon carbide (SiC) to high temperatures (>1100 °C) under low pressures (~10^{−6} torr) reduces it to graphene. This process produces epitaxial graphene with dimensions dependent upon the size of the wafer. The polarity of the SiC used for graphene formation, silicon- or carbon-polar, highly influences the thickness, mobility and carrier density.

Graphene's electronic band-structure (so-called Dirac cone structure) was first visualized in this material. Weak anti-localization is observed in this material, but not in exfoliated graphene produced by the drawing method. Large, temperature-independent mobilities approach those in exfoliated graphene placed on silicon oxide, but lower than mobilities in suspended graphene produced by the drawing method. Even without transfer, graphene on SiC exhibits massless Dirac fermions. The graphene–substrate interaction can be further passivated.

The weak van der Waals force that coheres multilayer stacks does not always affect the individual layers' electronic properties. That is, while the electronic properties of certain multilayered epitaxial graphenes are identical to that of a single layer, other properties are affected, as they are in bulk graphite. This effect is well understood theoretically and is related to the symmetry of the interlayer interactions.

Epitaxial graphene on SiC can be patterned using standard microelectronics methods. A band gap can be created and tuned by laser irradiation.

=== Silicon/germanium/hydrogen ===
A normal silicon wafer coated with a layer of germanium (Ge) dipped in dilute hydrofluoric acid strips the naturally forming germanium oxide groups, creating hydrogen-terminated germanium. Chemical vapor deposition deposits a layer of graphene on top. The graphene can be peeled from the wafer using a dry process and is then ready for use. The wafer can be reused. The graphene is wrinkle-free, high quality and low in defects.

=== Metal single crystal substrates ===
Metal single crystals are often used as substrates in graphene growth since they form a smooth and chemically uniform growth platform for graphene. Especially, the chemical uniformity is an important advantage of metal single crystal surfaces: for example in different oxide surfaces the oxidized component and the oxygen forms very different adsorption sites. A typical metal single crystal substrate surface is hexagonal close-packed surface since this geometry is also the geometry of carbon atoms in a graphene layer. Common surfaces that have hexagonal close packed geometry are for example FCC(111) and HCP(0001) surfaces. Of course, the similar surface geometries alone do not ensure perfect graphene adsorption on the surface since the distances between surface metal atoms and carbon atoms can be different, resulting in moiré patterns. Common metal surfaces for graphene growth are Pt(111), Ir(111), Ni(111), Ru(0001), Co(0001) and Cu(111) but also at least Fe(110), Au(111), Pd(111), Re(101͊0) and Rh(111) have been used.

==== Preparation methods of metal single crystal substrates ====
There are several methods how good quality metal single crystal substrates can be manufactured. Czochralski and Bridgman–Stockbarger methods are common industrial methods for bulk metal crystal manufacturing. In these methods, the metal is first melted, after which the metal is let to crystallize around a seed crystal. After crystallization, the crystal is cut into wafers. Other commonly used method especially in research is epitaxy, which enables the growth of numerous different metal single crystal surfaces on some commonly available single crystals like monocrystalline silicon. The advantage of epitaxy over the industrial methods is its low material consumption: with epitaxy substrates with thickness in nanometer scale can be manufactured in comparison to complete self-supporting wafers. This is especially important with rare and expensive metals like rhenium and gold.

=== Ruthenium(0001) ===
Graphene can be grown on ruthenium(0001) surface with CVD, temperature programmed growth (TPG) or segregation. In CVD, a hot ruthenium surface is exposed for some carbon containing molecule like methane or ethene. This results in graphene formation. It has been observed that the graphene can grow only "downhill" of the ruthenium surface steps, not uphill. Graphene bonds strongly with covalent bonds to the surface and has only 1.45 Å separation to the surface. This affects the electronic structure of the graphene layer, and the layer behaves differently than a free-standing graphene layer. However, the CVD graphene growth on ruthenium is not totally self-terminating and multilayer graphene formation is possible. The second and higher layers cannot bond to the existing graphene layers as strongly as the first layer bonds to the metal surface, which results in higher 3 Å separation between the graphene layers. The second layer thus has much weaker interaction with the substrate and has very similar electronic properties as free-standing graphene. Due to the strong bonding of graphene on the ruthenium surface, only R0 orientation is observed for graphene layer. Although, different studies have shown different lengths for the moiré repeat distance, varying around Graphene(11 x 11) and Ru(10 x 10). The moiré pattern also causes strong corrugation for the graphene layer, peak height being as much as 1.5 Å.

=== Iridium(111) ===
Graphene is commonly deposited on iridium(111) by CVD but also with temperature programmed growth (TPG) is possible. In CVD, a hot iridium surface is exposed to ethylene. Ethylene decomposes on the surface due to pyrolysis, and the formed carbon adsorbs to the surface forming a graphene monolayer. Thus, only a monolayer growth is possible. The formed graphene layer is weakly bounded to the iridium substrate and is located about 3.3 Å above the surface. The graphene layer and the Ir(111) substrate also forms a moiré pattern with period around 25 Å, depending on the orientation of the graphene on Ir(111). There are many different possibilities for the graphene layer orientation, the most common ones being R0 and R30. The graphene layer has also corrugation due to the moiré pattern, with height varying from 0.04 Å to 0.3 Å. Due to the long-range order of these ripples, minigaps in the electronic band-structure (Dirac cone) become visible.

=== Platinum(111) ===
Graphene sheets have been reported to be grown by dosing ethylene onto the clean, single platinum(111) substrate at temperatures above 1000 °C in ultra-high vacuum (UHV). Graphene monolayer interacts weakly with the Pt(111) surface below it confirmed by the local density of states which is a 'V' shape. Kim et al., reported the electronic properties of the graphene nanoislands whose geometry is affected by varying the annealing temperatures and providing a fundamental understanding on graphene growth. The effect of annealing on the average size and density of graphene islands grown on Pt(111) has been widely studied. Sutter et al., reported a thermal-stress driven wrinkle propagation on the graphene sheet as observed from low-energy electron microscopy during cooling after growth. The onset of lattice mismatch precedes the observation of moiré patterns with small (e.g., (3x3)G) and large unit cells (e.g., (8x8)G).

=== Nickel(111) ===
High-quality sheets of few-layer graphene exceeding 1 cm^{2} (0.2 sq in) in area have been synthesized via CVD on thin nickel films using multiple techniques. First the film is exposed to argon gas at 900–1000 degrees Celsius. Methane is then mixed into the gas, and the methane's disassociated carbon is absorbed into the film. The solution is then cooled and the carbon diffuses out of the nickel to form graphene films. CVD grown graphene on Ni(111) surface forms (1 x 1) structure, i.e. the lattice constants of Ni and graphene matches and no moiré pattern is formed. There are still different possible adsorption sites for carbon atoms on nickel, at least top, hcp hollow, fcc hollow and bridge sites have been reported [17].

Another method used temperatures compatible with conventional CMOS processing, using a nickel-based alloy with a gold catalyst. This process dissolves carbon atoms inside a transition metal melt at a certain temperature and then precipitates the dissolved carbon at lower temperatures as single layer graphene (SLG).

The metal is first melted in contact with a carbon source, possibly a graphite crucible inside which the melt is carried out or graphite powder/chunks that are placed in the melt. Keeping the melt in contact with the carbon at a specific temperature dissolves the carbon atoms, saturating the melt based on the metal–carbon binary phase diagram. Lowering the temperature decreases carbon's solubility and the excess carbon precipitates onto the melt. The floating layer can be either skimmed or frozen for later removal.

Using different morphology, including thick graphite, few layer graphene (FLG) and SLG were observed on metal substrate. Raman spectroscopy proved that SLG had grown on nickel substrate. The SLG Raman spectrum featured no D and D′ band, indicating its pristine nature. Since nickel is not Raman active, direct Raman spectroscopy of graphene layers on top of the nickel is achievable.

Another approach covered a sheet of silicon dioxide glass (the substrate) on one side with a nickel film. Graphene deposited via chemical vapor deposition formed into layers on both sides of the film, one on the exposed top side, and one on the underside, sandwiched between nickel and glass. Peeling the nickel and the top layer of graphene left an intervening layer of graphene on the glass. While the top graphene layer could be harvested from the foil as in earlier methods, the bottom layer was already in place on the glass. The quality and purity of the attached layer was not assessed.

=== Cobalt(0001) ===
Graphene on cobalt(0001) is grown similarly as on a Ni substrate. A Co(0001) film is first grown on a wolfram(110) substrate, following which chemical vapor deposition of propylene at 450 °C enables graphene growth on Co(0001). This results in a p(1x1) structure along with structures that indicated domains of graphene slightly rotated with respect to the Co lattice. Graphene structures grown on Co(0001) are found to be identical to those grown on Ni(111) upon structural and electronic characterization. Co(0001) is ferromagnetic but the graphene monolayer grown over was found to not diminish the spin polarization. Unlike its Ni(111) counterpart, graphene grown on Co(0001) does not show the Rashba effect.

=== Copper ===
Copper foil, at room temperature and very low pressure and in the presence of small amounts of methane produces high quality graphene. The growth automatically stops after a single layer forms. Arbitrarily large films can be created. The single layer growth is due to the low concentration of carbon in methane. The process is surface-based rather than relying on absorption into the metal and then diffusion of carbon into graphene layers on the surface. The room temperature process eliminates the need for postproduction steps and reduces production from a ten-hour/nine- to ten-step procedure to a single step that takes five minutes. A chemical reaction between the hydrogen plasma formed from the methane and ordinary air molecules in the chamber generates cyano radicals. These charged molecules scour away surface imperfections, providing a pristine substrate. The graphene deposits form lines that merge into each other, forming a seamless sheet that contributes to mechanical and electrical integrity.

Larger hydrocarbons such as ethane and propane produce bilayer coatings. Atmospheric pressure CVD growth produces multilayer graphene on copper (similar to nickel).

The material has fewer defects, which in higher temperature processes result from thermal expansion/contraction. Ballistic transport was observed in the resulting material.

=== Tin ===
Tin has been recently used for synthesis of graphene at 250 °C. Low-temperature as well as the transfer free graphene growth on substrates is the major concern of graphene research for its practical applications. The transfer free graphene growth on SiO2 covered Si (SiO2/Si) substrate at 250 °C based on a solid-liquid-solid reaction has been achieved by tin.

=== Sodium ethoxide pyrolysis ===
Gram-quantities were produced by the reduction of ethanol by sodium metal, followed by pyrolysis of the ethoxide product and washing with water to remove sodium salts.

=== Roll-to-roll ===
Large scale roll-to-roll production of graphene based on chemical vapor deposition, was first demonstrated in 2010. In 2014 a two-step roll-to-roll manufacturing process was announced. The first roll-to-roll step produces the graphene via chemical vapor deposition, and the second step binds the graphene to a substrate. In 2018, researchers at MIT refined the roll-to-roll process, creating a promising way to produce large amounts of graphene.

=== Cold wall ===
Growing graphene in an industrial resistive-heating cold wall CVD system was claimed to produce graphene 100 times faster than conventional CVD systems, cuts costs by 99 percent and produce material with enhanced electronic qualities.

Cold wall CVD technique can be used to study the underlying surface science involved in graphene nucleation and growth as it allows unprecedented control of process parameters like gas flow rates, temperature and pressure as demonstrated in a recent study. The study was carried out in a home-built vertical cold wall system utilizing resistive heating by passing direct current through the substrate. It provided conclusive insight into a typical surface-mediated nucleation and growth mechanism involved in two-dimensional materials grown using catalytic CVD under conditions sought out in the semiconductor industry.

== Nanotube slicing ==
Graphene can be created by cutting open carbon nanotubes. In one such method multi-walled carbon nanotubes are cut open in solution by action of potassium permanganate and sulfuric acid. In another method graphene nanoribbons were produced by plasma etching of nanotubes partly embedded in a polymer film.

== Langmuir-Blodgett (LB) ==
In applications where the thickness and packing density of graphene layer needs to carefully controlled, the Langmuir-Blodgett method has been used. In addition to forming directly a layer of graphene, another approach that has been widely studied is forming a graphene oxide layer which can then be reduced further into graphene.

Some of the benefits of LB deposition include an accurate control over the layered architecture of the graphene, the layer-by-layer deposition process is amenable to assembling any combination of thin carbon layers on a substrates, the assembly process operates at room temperature and produces high throughputs while it is amenable to automation and mass production.

== Carbon dioxide reduction ==
A highly exothermic reaction combusts magnesium in an oxidation–reduction reaction with carbon dioxide, producing a variety of carbon nanoparticles including graphene and fullerenes. The carbon dioxide reactant may be either solid (dry-ice) or gaseous. The products of this reaction are carbon and magnesium oxide.

== Spin coating ==
In 2014, carbon nanotube-reinforced graphene was made via spin coating and annealing functionalized carbon nanotubes. The resulting material was stronger, flexible and more conductive than conventional graphene.

== Supersonic spray ==
Supersonic acceleration of droplets through a Laval nozzle was used to deposit small droplets of reduced graphene-oxide in suspension on a substrate. The droplets disperse evenly, evaporate rapidly and display reduced flake aggregations. In addition, the topological defects (Stone-Wales defect and C_{2} vacancies) originally in the flakes disappeared. The result was a higher quality graphene layer. The energy of the impact stretches the graphene and rearranges its carbon atoms into flawless hexagonal graphene with no need for post-treatment. The high amount of energy also allows the graphene droplets to heal any defects in the graphene layer that occur during this process.

Another approach sprays buckyballs at supersonic speeds onto a substrate. The balls cracked open upon impact, and the resulting unzipped cages then bond together to form a graphene film. The buckyballs are released into a helium or hydrogen gas, which expands at supersonic speeds, carrying the carbon balls with it. The buckyballs achieve energies of around 40 keV without changing their internal dynamics. This material contains hexagons and pentagons that come from the original structures. The pentagons could introduce a band gap.

== Intercalation ==
Producing graphene via intercalation splits graphite into single layer graphene by inserting guest molecules/ions between the graphite layers. Graphite was first intercalated in 1841 using a strong oxidizing or reducing agent that damaged the material's desirable properties. Kovtyukhova developed a widely used oxidative intercalation method in 1999. In 2014, she was able to achieve intercalation using non-oxidizing Brønsted acids (phosphoric, sulfuric, dichloroacetic and alkylsulfonic acids), but without oxidizing agents. The new method has yet to achieve output sufficient for commercialization.

== Reduction of Graphene Oxide through Laser Irradiation ==
Applying a layer of graphite oxide film to a DVD and burning it in a DVD writer produced a thin graphene film with high electrical conductivity (1738 siemens per meter) and specific surface area (1520 square meters per gram) that was highly resistant and malleable.

== Microwave-assisted oxidation ==
In 2012, a microwave-assisted, scalable approach was reported to directly synthesize graphene with different size from graphite in one step. The resulting graphene does not need any post reduction treatment as it contains very little oxygen. This approach avoids use of potassium permanganate in the reaction mixture. It was also reported that by microwave radiation assistance, graphene oxide with or without holes can be synthesized by controlling microwave time. This method uses a recipe similar to Hummer's method, but uses microwave heating instead of traditional heating. Microwave heating can dramatically shorten the reaction time from days to seconds.

== Ion implantation ==
Accelerating carbon ions under an electrical field into a semiconductor made of thin Ni films on a substrate of SiO2/Si, creates a wafer-scale (4 inches (100 mm)) wrinkle/tear/residue-free graphene layer that changes the semiconductor's physical, chemical and electrical properties. The process uses 20 keV and a dose of 1 × 10^{15} cm^{−2} at a relatively low temperature of 500 °C. This was followed by high-temperature activation annealing (600–900 °C) to form an sp^{2}-bonded structure.

== Heated vegetable oil ==
Researchers heated soybean oil in a furnace for ≈30 minutes. The heat decomposed the oil into elemental carbon that deposited on nickel foil as single/few-layer graphene.

== Bacteria processing of graphene oxide ==
Graphene oxide can be converted to graphene using the bacteria Shewanella oneidensis

== Graphene characterization techniques ==
=== Low-energy and photoemission electron microscopy ===
Low-energy electron microscopy (LEEM) and photoemission electron microscopy (PEEM) are techniques suited to performing dynamic observations of surfaces with nanometer resolution in a vacuum. With LEEM, it is possible to carry out low-energy electron diffraction (LEED) and micro-LEED experiments. LEED is the standard method for studying the surface structure of a crystalline material. Low-energy electrons (20–200 eV) impact the surface and elastically backscattered electrons illuminate a diffraction pattern on a fluorescent screen. The LEED method is a surface-sensitive technique as electrons have low energy and are not able to penetrate deep into the sample. For example, a micro-sized LEED revealed the presence of rotational variations of graphene on SiC substrate.

=== Raman spectroscopy and microscopy ===
Raman spectroscopy can provide information about the number of layers on graphene stacks, the atomic structure of graphene edges, disorder and defects, the stacking order between different layers, the effect of strain, and charge transfer. Graphene has three main features in its Raman spectrum, called the D, G, and 2D (also called G') modes that appear at about 1350, 1583 and 2700 cm-1.

=== Scanning tunneling microscopy ===
In scanning tunneling microscopy (STM), a sharp tip scans the surface of a sample in a regime of such tip-sample distances that electrons can quantum tunneling from the tip to the sample surface or vice versa. STM can be performed in a constant current or a constant height mode. The low temperature STM measurements provide thermal stability, which is a requirement for high resolution imaging and spectroscopic analysis. The first atomically resolved images of graphene grown on a platinum substrate were obtained using STM in the 1990s.

=== Atomic and electrostatic force microscopy ===
Atomic force microscopy (AFM) is mostly used to measure the force between atoms located at the sharp point of the tip (located on the cantilever) and atoms at the sample surface. The bending of the cantilever as a result of the interaction between the tip and the sample is detected and converted to an electrical signal. The electrostatic force microscopy mode of AFM has been used to detect the surface potential of graphene layers as a function of thickness variation allowing for quantification of potential difference maps showing distinction between graphene layers of different thicknesses.

=== Transmission electron microscopy ===
Transmission electron microscopy (TEM) uses electrons to generate high-resolution images as using electrons allows to overcome limitations of visible light wavelengths. TEM on graphene should be done with electron energy less than 80 keV to induce a smaller amount of defects, because this energy is the threshold electron energy for damaging a single-wall carbon nano-tube. There are some other difficulties in the study of graphene by TEM, e.g., in a plane-view geometry (top-view graphene) the substrate causes strong electron scattering, and a thick substrate makes it impossible to detect the graphene layer. For a cross-section view, detecting a monolayer graphene is a difficult task as it needs simulation of the TEM images.

=== Scanning electron microscopy ===
In scanning electron microscopy (SEM), a high-energy electron beam (ranging a few 100 eVs to a few keVs) is used to generate a variety of signals at the surface of a sample. These signals which come from the electron-sample interactions expose information about the sample, including surface morphology, crystalline structure, and chemical composition. SEM is also used for characterizations of the growth of graphene on SiC. Because of its atomic thickness, graphene is usually detected with secondary electrons that probe only a sample surface. With SEM imaging, different contrast can be observed, such as thickness, roughness, and edge contrast; the brighter area shows the thinner part of the graphene layers. The roughness contrast of a graphene layer is due to the different numbers of secondary electrons detected. The defects such as wrinkles, ruptures, and folds can be studied by different contrast in SEM images.

== See also ==
- Exfoliated graphite nano-platelets
- Metal-organic framework
- Two-dimensional polymer
- HSMG (High Strength Metallurgical Graphene)
