= Nuclear graphite =

Graphite used as a reflector or moderator within a nuclear reactor

Nuclear graphite is any grade of graphite, usually synthetic graphite, manufactured for use as a moderator or reflector within a nuclear reactor. Graphite is an important material for the construction of both historical and modern nuclear reactors because of its extreme purity and ability to withstand extremely high temperatures.

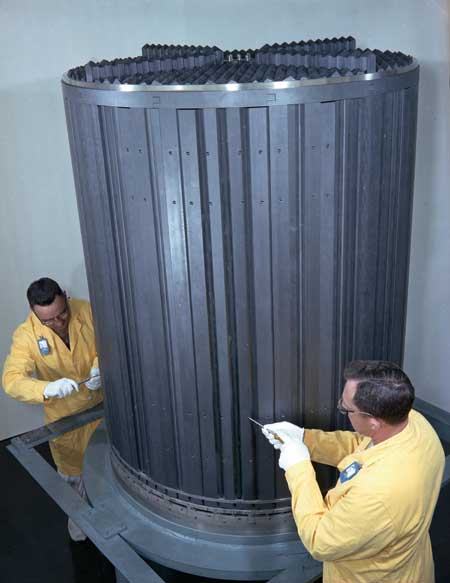
Core graphite from the Molten-Salt Reactor Experiment

== History ==
Nuclear fission was discovered in 1939 following experiments by Otto Hahn and Fritz Strassman, and the interpretation of their results by physicists such as Lise Meitner and Otto Frisch. Shortly thereafter, word of the discovery spread throughout the international physics community.

In order for the fission process to chain react, the neutrons created by uranium fission must be slowed down by interacting with a neutron moderator (an element with a low atomic weight, that will "bounce", when hit by a neutron) before they will be captured by other uranium atoms. By late 1939, it was generally known that heavy water might be used as a moderator. The highest-purity graphite then commercially available (so called electro-graphite) was dismissed by the Germans and the British as a possible moderator because it contained boron and cadmium impurities. However, graphite of high enough purity was developed in the early 1940's in the United States, and this then was utilized in the first and subsequent nuclear reactors for the Manhattan Project.

In February 1940, using funds that were allocated partly as a result of the Einstein-Szilard letter to President Roosevelt, Leo Szilard purchased several tons of graphite from the Speer Carbon Company and from the National Carbon Company (the National Carbon Division of the Union Carbide and Carbon Corporation in Cleveland, Ohio) for use in Enrico Fermi's first fission experiments, the so-called exponential pile. Fermi writes that "The results of this experiment was [sic] somewhat discouraging" presumably because of the absorption of neutrons by some unknown impurity. So, in December 1940 Fermi and Szilard met with Herbert G. MacPherson and V. C. Hamister at National Carbon to discuss the possible existence of impurities in graphite. During this conversation it became clear that minute quantities of boron impurities were the source of the problem.

As a result of this meeting, over the next two years, MacPherson and Hamister developed thermal and gas extraction purification techniques at National Carbon for the production of boron-free graphite. The resulting product was designated AGOT Graphite ("Acheson Graphite Ordinary Temperature") by National Carbon, and it was "the first true nuclear grade graphite".

During this period, Fermi and Szilard purchased graphite from several manufacturers with various degrees of neutron absorption cross section: AGX graphite from National Carbon Company with 6.68 mb (millibarns) cross section, US graphite from United States Graphite Company with 6.38 mb cross section, Speer graphite from the Speer Carbon Company with 5.51 mb cross section, and when it became available, AGOT graphite from National Carbon, with 4.97 mb cross section. By November 1942 National Carbon had shipped 250 tons of AGOT graphite to the University of Chicago where it became the primary source of graphite to be used in the construction of Fermi's Chicago Pile-1, the first nuclear reactor to generate a sustained chain reaction (December 2, 1942). In early 1943 AGOT graphite was used to build the X-10 Graphite Reactor at Clinton Engineer Works in Tennessee and the first reactors at the Hanford Site in Washington, for the production of plutonium during and after World War II. The AGOT process and its later refinements became standard techniques in the manufacture of nuclear graphite.

The neutron cross section of graphite was investigated during the Second World War in Germany by Walter Bothe, P. Jensen, and Werner Heisenberg. The purest graphite available to them was a product from the Siemens Plania company, which exhibited a neutron absorption cross section of about 6.4 mb to 7.5 mb. Heisenberg therefore decided that graphite would be unsuitable as a moderator in a reactor design using natural uranium. Consequently, the German effort to create a chain reaction involved attempts to use heavy water, an expensive and scarce alternative, made all the more difficult to acquire as a consequence of the Norwegian heavy water sabotage by Norwegian and Allied forces. Writing as late as 1947, Heisenberg still did not understand that the only problem with graphite was the boron impurity.

After testing indigenous electro-graphite, Soviet scientists were able to procure and test American Acheson Graphite in 1943 and subsequently reproduced the technology.

Graphite has also recently been used in nuclear fusion reactors such as the Wendelstein 7-X. As of experiments published in 2019, graphite in elements of the stellarator's wall and a graphite island divertor have greatly improved plasma performance within the device, yielding better control over impurity and heat exhaust, and long high-density discharges.

== Wigner effect ==
In December 1942 Eugene Wigner suggested that neutron bombardment might introduce dislocations and other damage in the molecular structure of materials such as the graphite moderator in a nuclear reactor. The resulting buildup of energy in the material became a matter of concern The possibility was suggested that graphite bars might fuse together as chemical bonds at the surface of the bars when opened and closed again. Even the possibility that the graphite parts might very quickly break into small pieces could not be ruled out. However, the first power-producing reactors (X-10 Graphite Reactor and Hanford B Reactor) had to be built without such knowledge. Cyclotrons, which were the only fast neutron sources available, would take several months to produce neutron irradiation equivalent to one day in B Reactor.

This was the starting point for large-scale research programmes to investigate the property changes from fast particle radiation and to predict their influence on the safety and the lifetime of graphite reactors to be built. Influences of fast neutron radiation material properties have been observed many times and in many countries after the first results emerged from the X-10 Graphite Reactor in 1944.

Specific changes to graphite when irradiated include:

- Dimensional change (shrinkage and neutron-induced swelling, as well as possible hardening)
- Change in elastic modulus (measured by impulse excitation technique)
- Change in coefficient of thermal expansion
- Change in thermal conductivity
- Change in electrical resistivity
- Irradiation induced creep

As the state of nuclear graphite in active reactors can only be determined at routine inspections, about every 18 months mathematical modelling of the nuclear graphite as it approaches end-of-life is important. However as only surface features can be inspected and the exact time of changes is not known, reliability modelling is especially difficult. Although catastrophic behaviour such as fusion or crumbling of graphite pieces has never occurred, large changes in many properties do result from fast neutron irradiation which need to be taken into account when graphite components of nuclear reactors are designed. Although not all effects are well understood yet, more than 100 graphite reactors have successfully operated for decades since the 1940s. In the 2010s, the collection of new material property data has improved knowledge significantly.

== Manufacture ==
Reactor-grade graphite must be free of neutron absorbing materials, especially boron, which has a large neutron capture cross section. Boron sources in graphite include the raw materials, the packing materials used in baking the product, and even the choice of soap (for example, borax) used to launder the clothing worn by workers in the machine shop. Boron concentration in thermally purified graphite (such as AGOT graphite) can be less than 0.4 ppm, and in chemically purified nuclear graphite it is less than 0.06 ppm.

Nuclear graphite for the UK Magnox reactors was manufactured from petroleum coke mixed with coal-based binder pitch heated and extruded into billets, and then baked at 1,000 °C for several days. To reduce porosity and increase density, the billets were impregnated with coal tar at high temperature and pressure before a final bake at 2,800 °C. Individual billets were then machined into the final required shapes.

== Accidents in graphite-moderated reactors ==
There have been two major accidents in graphite-moderated reactors, the Windscale fire and the Chernobyl disaster.

In the Windscale fire, an untested annealing process for the graphite was used, causing overheating in unmonitored areas of the core and leading directly to the ignition of the fire. The material that ignited was the canisters of metallic uranium fuel within the reactor. When the fire was extinguished, it was found that the only areas of the graphite moderator to have incurred thermal damage were those that had been close to the burning fuel canisters.

In the Chernobyl disaster, the moderator was not responsible for the primary event. Instead, a massive power excursion (exacerbated by the high and positive void coefficient of the RBMK as it was designed and used at the time) during a mishandled test caused the catastrophic failure of the reactor vessel and a near-total loss of coolant supply. The result was that the fuel rods rapidly melted and flowed together while in an extremely high power state, causing a small portion of the core to reach a state of runaway prompt criticality and leading to a massive energy release, resulting in the explosion of the reactor core and the destruction of the reactor building. The massive energy release during the primary event superheated the graphite moderator, and the disruption of the reactor vessel and building allowed the superheated graphite to come into contact with atmospheric oxygen. As a result, the graphite moderator caught fire, sending a plume of highly radioactive fallout into the atmosphere and over a very widespread area.
