= HSMG =

Polycrystalline graphene

HSMG (High Strength Metallurgical Graphene) is polycrystalline graphene, grown from a liquid phase.

This process, in comparison to other methods based on using solid substrates, allows to manufacture defect-free graphene structures. HSMG is formed on a perfectly flat surface - liquid metal. While growing graphene on solid substrates is difficult due to surface irregularities and defects. Growing graphene on a liquid metal matrix enables the rotation of graphene grains, resulting in forming a continuous graphene sheet. Because of that, the grain disorientation angle is close to zero. Large-area graphene sheets formed with this method have high mechanical durability, close to graphene's theoretical values. This production method has been developed and patented by a team of scientists from the Institute of Materials Science of Lodz University of Technology, under the direction of Piotr Kula. HSMG graphene's commercialisation and applications are being handled by a spin-off institution - Advanced Graphene Products sp. z o.o.
