= Exfoliated graphite nanoplatelets =

Type of nanoparticles made from graphite

Exfoliated graphite nano-platelets (xGnP) are new types of nanoparticles made from graphite. These nanoparticles consist of small stacks of graphene that are 1 to 15 nanometers thick, with diameters ranging from sub-micrometre to 100 micrometres. The X-ray diffractogram of this material would resemble that of graphite, in that the 002 peak would still appear at ~26^{o} 2 theta. However, the peak would appear considerably smaller and broader. These features indicate that the interplanar distance in exfoliated graphite is similar to that of the parent graphite, but the stack size (of graphene layers) is small. Since xGnP is composed of the same material as carbon nanotubes, it shares many of the electrochemical characteristics, although not the tensile strength. The platelet shape, however, offers xGnP edges that are easier to modify chemically for enhanced dispersion in polymers.

Composite materials made with polymers, like plastics, nylon, or rubber, can be made electrically or thermally conductive with the addition of small amounts of xGnP. These nanoparticles can change the fundamental properties of plastics, enabling them to perform more like metals with metallic properties. These new nanoparticles also improve barrier properties, modulus, and surface toughness when used in composites.

== Properties ==
Graphene is extremely electrically conductive material. In turn, xGnP has a percolation threshold for conductivity of 1.9 wt% in thermoplastic matrix. At densities of 2–5 wt%, conductivity reaches sufficient levels to provide electromagnetic shielding. xGnP can also be combined with glass fibers or other matrix materials to provide sufficient conductivity for electrostatic painting or other applications requiring electrical conductivity.

xGnP significantly outperforms most other forms of carbon in terms of thermal conductivity when used at densities of 20 wt% in control resins. At these densities, xGnP also confers significant electrical conductivity as well as improved mechanical properties to most thermoplastic, thermoset, or elastomeric systems. At lesser densities, xGnP adds thermal stability to a variety of matrix materials.

As opposed to materials like carbon black, xGnP improves mechanical properties of most composites, particularly stiffness and tensile strength. Elastomeric compounds have been shown to experience increased life and reduced surface wear when reinforced with xGnP.

Because of the platelet shape, xGnP significantly improves the impermeability of composites when used at densities of ~3 wt% or greater. xGnP particles can be aligned using electric field, although alignment is not necessary for use in most extrusion systems. Because xGnP also imparts electrical conductivity at these densities, the resulting composites offer attractive cost savings for applications like fuel lines or fuel tank linings.
