= Cliftonite =

Natural form of graphite

General
- Category: Native element mineral
- Formula: C
- Crystal system: Hexagonal
- Crystal class: Dihexagonal dipyramidal (6/mmm); H-M symbol: (6/m 2/m 2/m)
- Space group: P6_{3}/mmc

Identification
- Color: Gray
- Crystal habit: Octahedra, cubes, cubo-octahedra, cubo-dodecahedra; isolated or aggregated, ca. 20 μm in size
- Mohs scale hardness: 1
- Luster: Sub-metallic
- Streak: gray

Cliftonite is a natural form of graphite that occurs as small octahedral inclusions in iron-containing meteorites. It typically accompanies kamacite, and more rarely schreibersite, cohenite or plessite.

Cliftonite was first considered to be a new form of carbon, then a pseudomorph of graphite after diamond, and finally reassigned to a pseudomorph of graphite after kamacite. Cliftonite is typically observed in minerals that experienced high pressures. It can also be synthesized by annealing an Fe-Ni-C alloy at ambient pressure for several hundred hours. The annealing is carried out in two stages: first a mixture of cohenite and kamacite is formed in air at ca. 950 °C; it is then partly converted to cliftonite in vacuum at ca. 550 °C.

The Campo del Cielo region of Argentina is noted for a crater field containing a group of distinctive iron meteorites.
