= Scope soldering iron =

Tool for soldering with lead-tin alloys

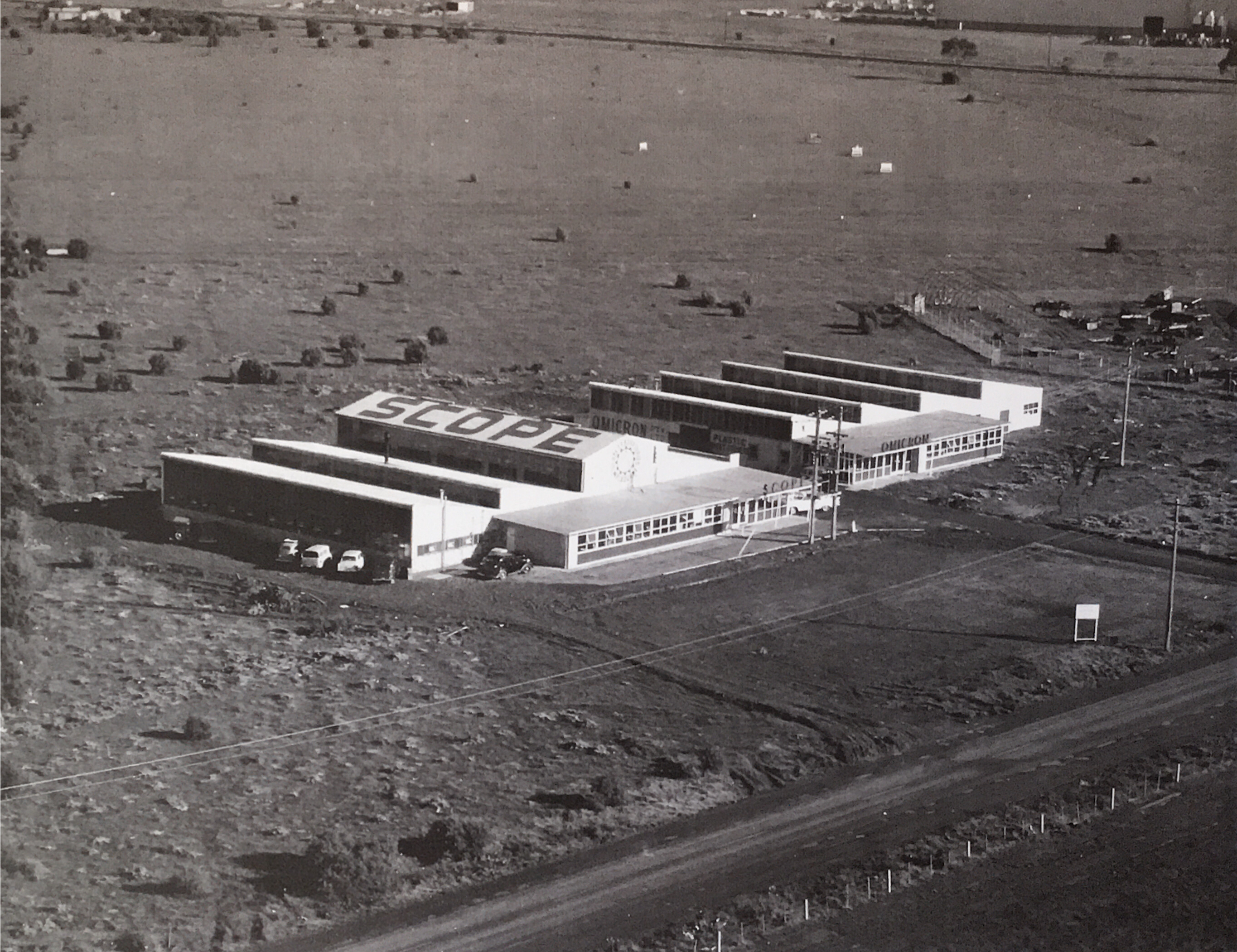
Scope Laboratories and Omicron Pty in 1962. The location is Matthews Avenue, Airport West. Walton St did not yet exist.

The "Scope" soldering iron is a tool for soldering with lead-tin alloys, made in Australia since 1950, and intended for occasional or intermittent use. It has the virtue of quickly coming up to soldering temperature (~300C) and delivering considerable heat to a small area, but requires care to avoid overheating. It operates on low voltage (3–6 V) and high current (tens of amps) from a battery or suitable transformer, so is by design electrically safe, and as it cools down rapidly when it leaves the operator's hand, should not constitute a fire risk.

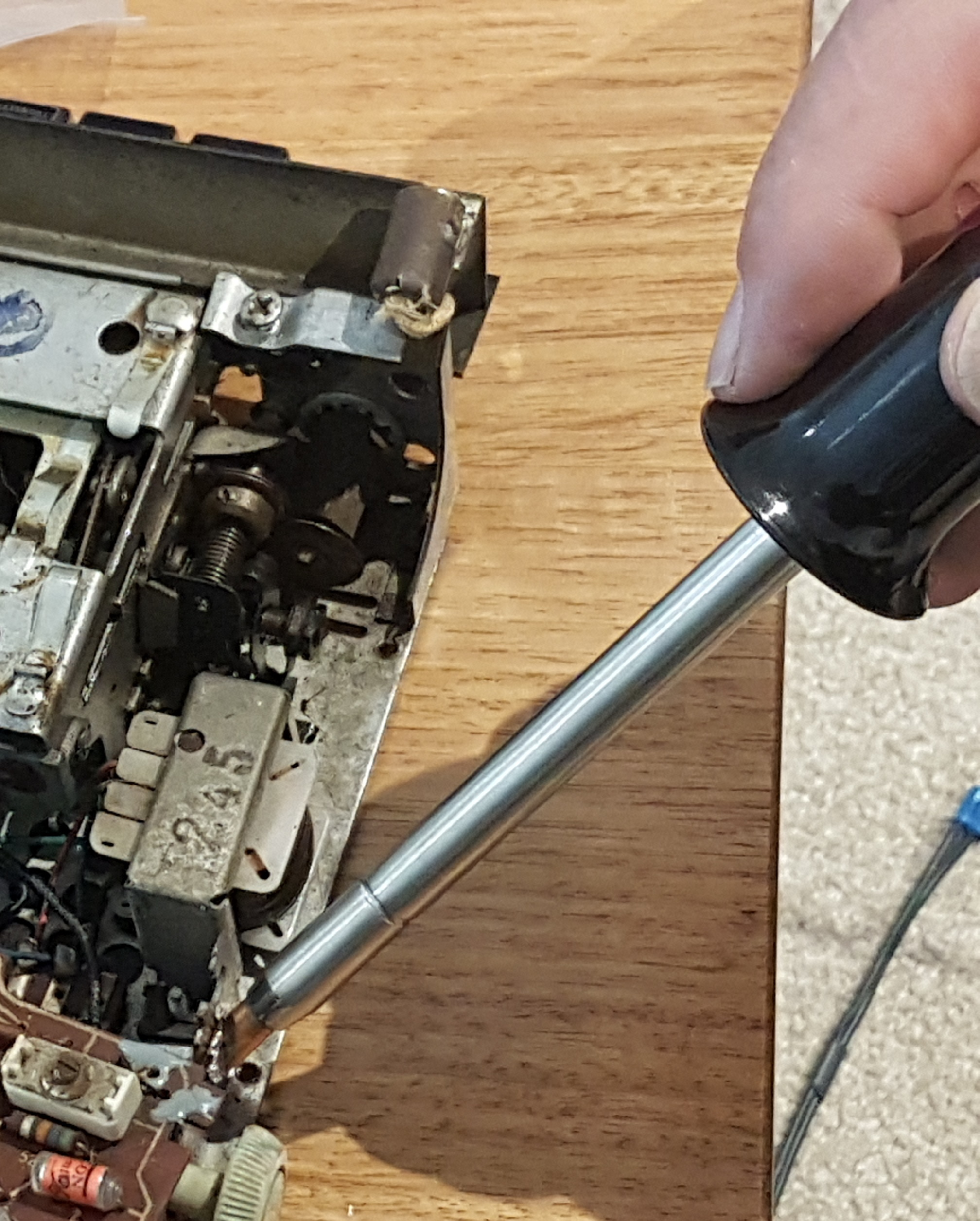
"Scope" soldering iron

== Principle of operation ==
The soldering iron's "element" is a small carbon tip at the end of a pushrod connected to one terminal of the power supply, inside the stainless-steel barrel of the tool, but insulated from it. The barrel and its copper tip (the "bit"), is connected to the other terminal. When the user operates the pushrod, the carbon element bears against the back of the "bit", resulting in electric heating of the resistive carbon. The user modulates the temperature of the "bit" by the pressure they exert on the pushrod, through a lever or sliding ring, depending on the model.

The carbon element and copper "bit" are replaceable.

== History ==
The original manufacturer, Scope Laboratories, of Melbourne, Australia, was a company founded in 1949 by two recent Czech immigrants, Richard Seligman and Egon Jelinek. With their families, they met on the journey to Australia in 1948. Seligman, an electrical engineer, had already been manufacturing oscilloscopes (colloquially "scopes") in Prague and had the intention to do the same in Australia. However, after arrival, he found that there were no suitable soldering irons available for electronics manufacture. At the suggestion of his wife, Lise, who also became a partner in the business, he and Jelinek, who was a mechanical engineer, designed and built the novel soldering iron which heated up in a matter of seconds rather than minutes. It was much lighter than a conventional 100 watt iron (e.g. "Birko") and safer because it only remained hot whilst in use. This soldering iron became popular for electronic, mechanical and hobbyist work in Australia.

Production of Scope soldering irons started in January 1949 in the residence of the Seligman family in Duffy Street North Essendon, but quickly moved to 417 Keilor Road, Essendon, Victoria and (later) 3 Walton Street, Airport West, Victoria. The "Scope" soldering iron when marketed in Australia in 1950, retailed at 43/6 (43 shillings and six pence, which converts to $4.35 before inflation), twice the price of a conventional iron. A suitable transformer was marketed (which doubled as a stand for the iron), also a metal etching pen "Vibroscope", which used the same transformer and the same basic handle. In the 1970s the company also manufactured a cordless pistol-grip soldering iron, which contained two nickel-cadmium rechargeable batteries, and worked on the same principle. When Seligman and Jelinek retired in 1973, Scope Laboratories was sold to Peninsula Bus Lines. Later, Scope Laboratories was a wholly owned subsidiary of Constructors, Developers and Fabricators Ltd., of which Bruce Small was a director and major shareholder.

The iron is still made and sold in Australia in its original (black handle) form, as well as an orange-handled version, dating from the 1970s, whose "sliding ring" also serves as a finger guard. There is also a "Mini-Scope", introduced in 1965, of smaller dimensions, which has a lever to operate the pushrod. The manufacturer (Warren and Brown) markets a suitable encapsulated 3 volt transformer, which also serves as a soldering-iron stand.

== Gallery ==
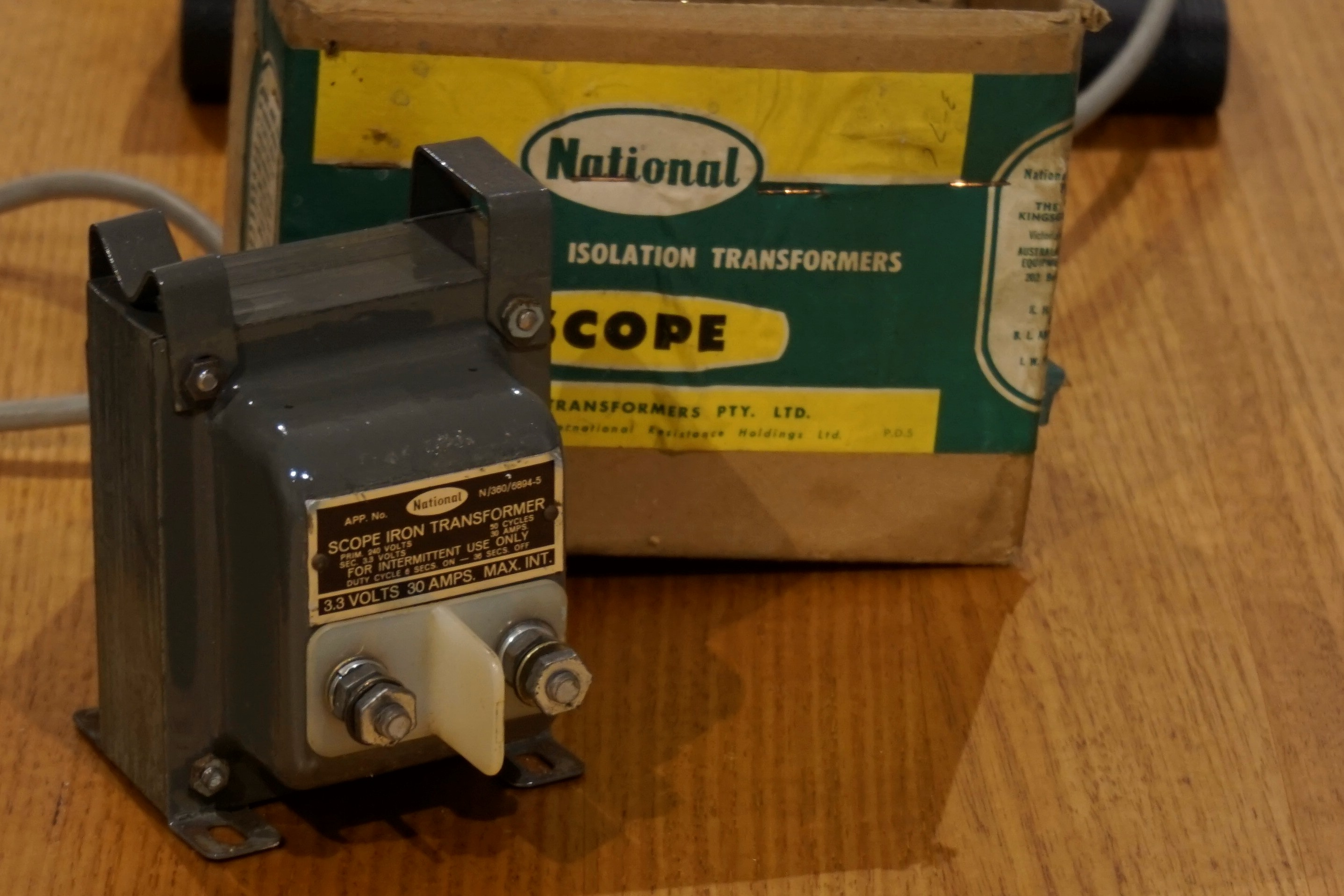
Early Scope transformer

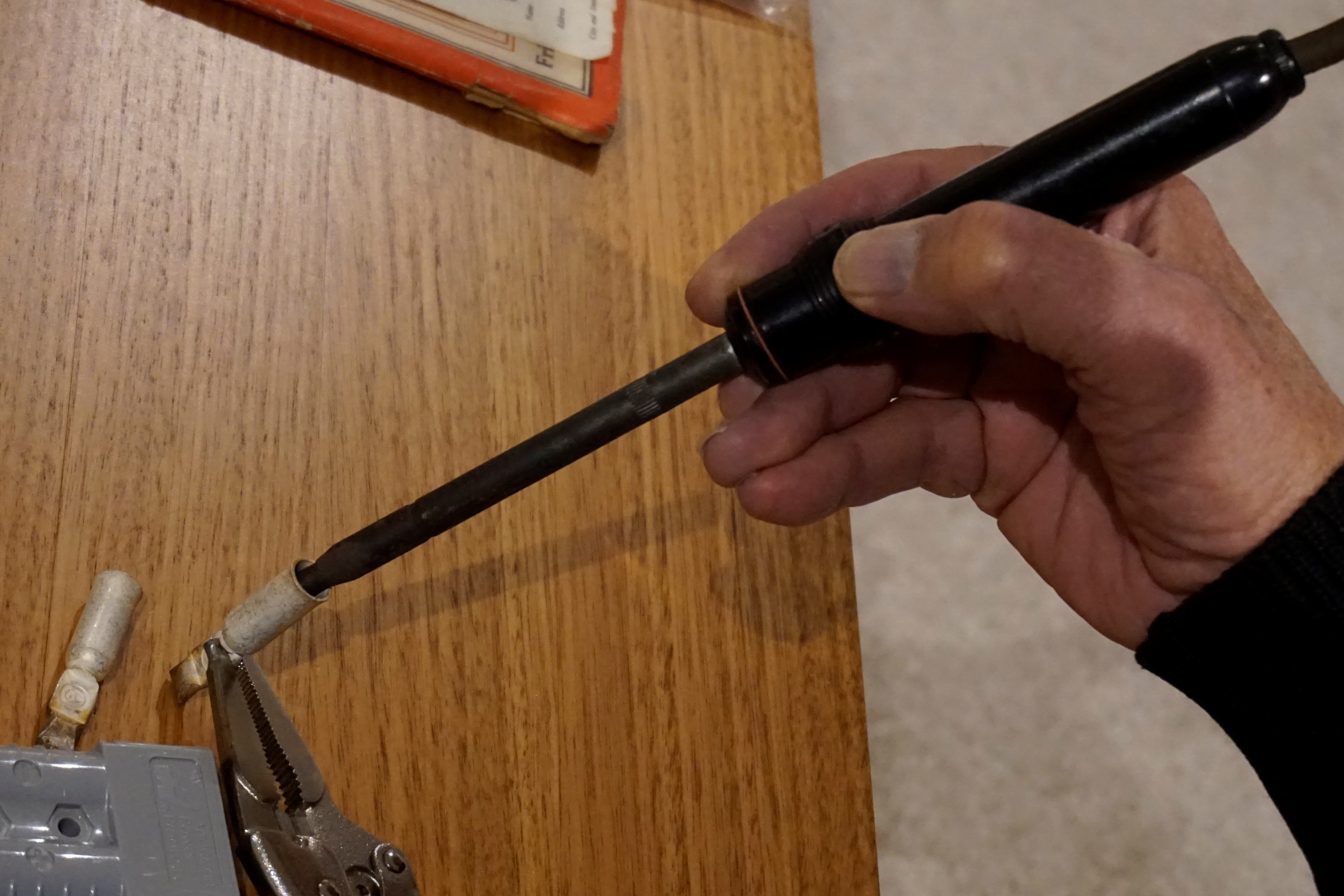
Original Scope iron

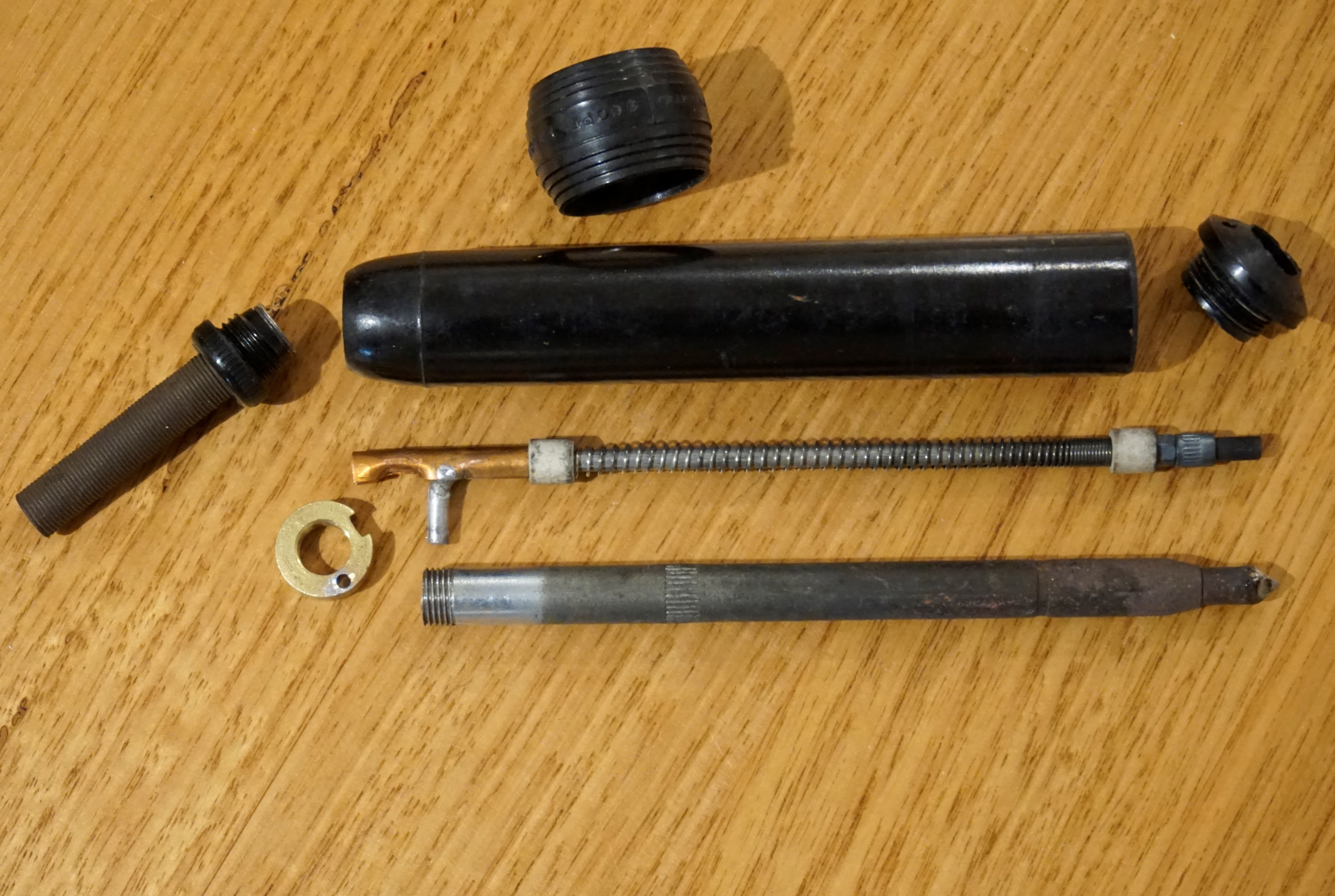
Scope iron assembly

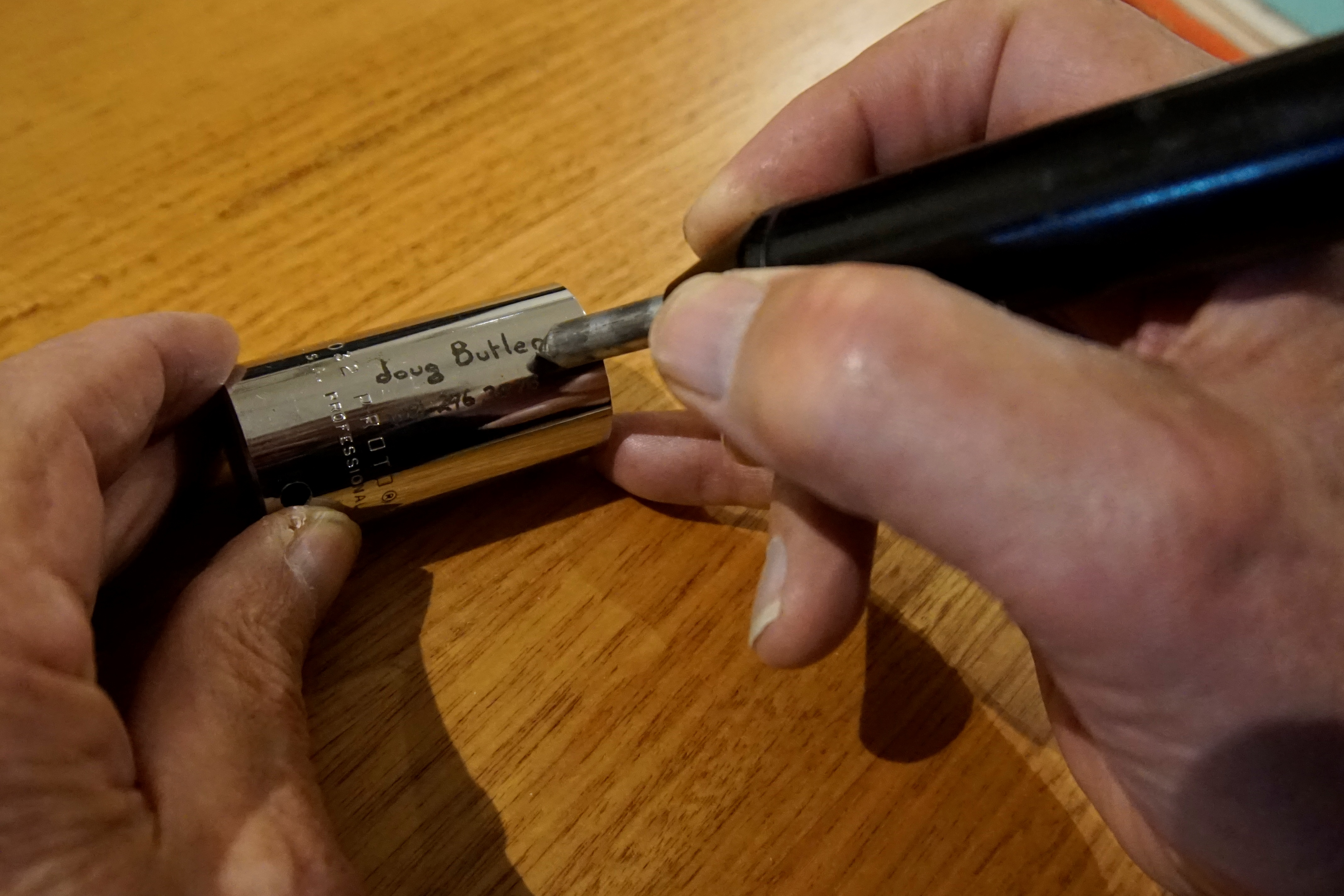
Early Vibroscope

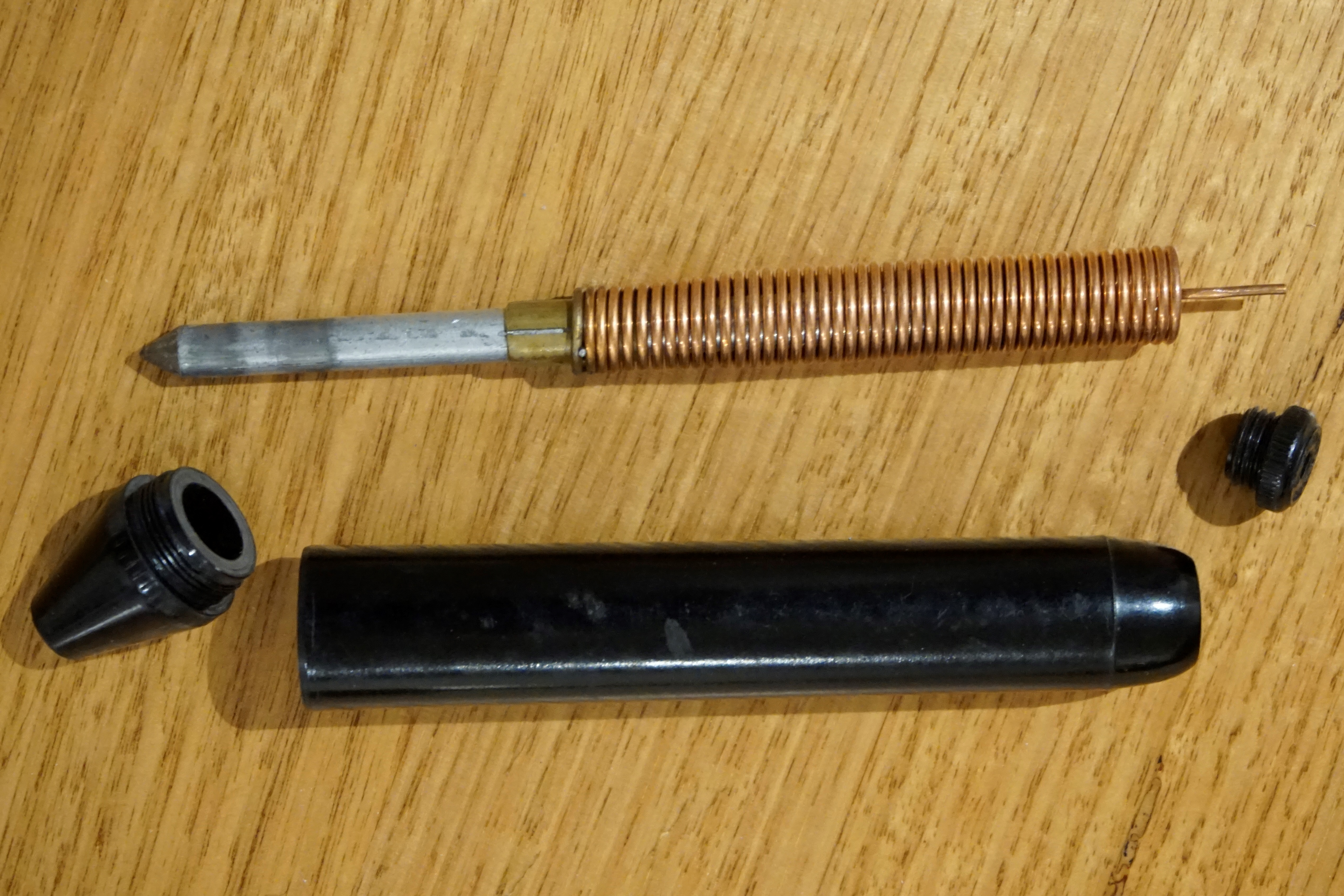
VibroScope assembly
