= Cytocompatibility =

Biological property of materials

Cytocompatibility refers to the ability of a material, surface, or substance to support cellular activity and viability without causing cytotoxic effects. It is a fundamental concept in biomaterials science, particularly in the development of medical devices, tissue engineering scaffolds, drug delivery systems, and cell encapsulation technologies.

== Definition and importance ==
A material is considered cytocompatible if it does not impair cell viability, proliferation, morphology, or function when in direct or indirect contact with cells. Cytocompatibility is often assessed through in vitro assays that evaluate cell adhesion, metabolic activity, membrane integrity, and gene expression.

Ensuring cytocompatibility is crucial for applications involving direct interaction with living tissues or cells. Poor cytocompatibility can lead to inflammatory responses, apoptosis, or impaired biological function, compromising the safety and effectiveness of biomedical interventions.

== Evaluation methods ==
Common methods to evaluate cytocompatibility include:

- MTT/XTT assays – measure metabolic activity as an indicator of viable cells
- Live/Dead staining – distinguish live and dead cells based on membrane integrity
- Lactate dehydrogenase (LDH) release – quantifies cytotoxicity via enzyme leakage
- Microscopy-based analysis – observes changes in cell morphology and attachment
- Flow cytometry – evaluates cell viability and apoptosis markers

These tests are often conducted according to international standards such as ISO 10993-5, which provides guidelines for the biological evaluation of medical devices.

== Applications ==
Cytocompatibility is a key criterion in fields such as:

- Tissue engineering: Ensuring scaffolds support cell growth and differentiation.
- Drug delivery: Verifying that carriers like liposomes, nanoparticles, or hydrogels do not harm target cells.
- Implantable devices: Minimizing adverse cellular responses to materials used in stents, pacemakers, and prosthetics.
- Single-cell nanoencapsulation (SCNE): Maintaining viability of encapsulated cells for therapeutic or analytical applications.

== Related concepts ==
- Biocompatibility: A broader term encompassing the interaction of materials with biological systems, including immunological and systemic responses.
- Cytotoxicity: The degree to which a substance is toxic to cells, typically the inverse of cytocompatibility.
- Hemocompatibility: Compatibility of a material with blood, particularly in cardiovascular devices.
