= Single-cell nanoencapsulation =

Single-cell nanoencapsulation (SCNE) is an interdisciplinary research field at the intersection of chemistry, biology, nanoscience, and materials science. Single-cell nanoencapsulation involves the development and application of nanometer-scaled shells for the isolation, protection, and functionalization of individual living cells. Single-cell nanoencapsulation enables the fundamental studies of cell–material interactions at the single-cell level, and supports research and development across a range of applied fields, including cell therapy, renewable energy, regenerative medicine, probiotics, and agricultural innovation. By controlling the cellular microenvironment at the nanoscale, single-cell nanoencapsulation allows for fine-tuned investigation of individual cell responses and the design of engineered cellular systems with tailored properties.

Single-cell nanoencapsulation is also a chemical strategy that creates "cell-in-shell" structures by forming artificial nanoshells (typically <100 nm in thickness) on individual cells. The cell-in-shell structures are referred to by various names depending on the context or application, including artificial spores, cyborg cells, Supracells, micrometric Iron Men, and micrometric Transformers.

Single-cell nanoencapsulation is considered complementary or, in some contexts superior to, cell microencapsulation techniques. Single-cell nanoencapsulation enables precise modulation and control of cellular behavior at the single-cell level by encapsulating individual cells within artificial nanoshells composed of organic, inorganic, or hybrid materials.

The term "SCNE" is also used as a verb in scientific literature, with phrases such as "SCNEd cells" referring to the cells that have gone through the process of single-cell nanoencapsulation.

Nanoshell properties for artificial spores have been proposed:

- durability: The nanoshell should be mechanically and (bio)chemically robust, capable of withstanding external stresses such as osmotic pressure and dehydration while preserving its structure. The durability could also enable control over cell growth and division by resisting internal biological forces.
- permselectivity: The porosity of the artificial shell should be chemically tunable to allow the selective exchange of small molecules—such as gases and nutrients—while blocking harmful agents like lytic enzymes and macrophages, thereby supporting cell viability.
- degradability: The shell should be designed to degrade on demand in a stimulus-responsive manner. Controlled chemical breakdown enables the restoration or activation of the nanoencapsulated cell's biological functions after chemical germination.
- functionalizability: The nanoshell should allow for chemical modification either during or after formation without compromising cell viability, enabling functional augmentation as well as specific recognition and interaction with the external environment.

== Shell materials ==
=== Melanin-like species ===
Melanin-like species are synthetic or naturally inspired materials that mimic the chemical structure, physical properties, or biological functions of natural melanin—the complex biopolymer responsible for pigmentation, ultraviolet protection, and radical scavenging in living organisms. Melanin-like species often include polymers, such as polydopamine and other analogs.

A research team led by Kourosh Kalantar-Zadeh and Md. Arifur Rahim developed a method of single-cell nanoencapsulation, in which probiotic lactic acid bacteria catalyzed the formation of cytoprotective shells of melanin-like species on their own surfaces. This process was facilitated by Mn^{2+}—an essential nutrient for lactic acid bacteria—which promoted the oxidation of external phenolic compounds (e.g., dopamine, caffeic acid, and pyrocatechol), thereby inducing the biointerfacial assembly of melanin-like species.

=== Metal–organic complexes ===
Metal–organic complexes are amorphous coordination compounds consisting of metal ions and organic ligands. Metal-phenolic networks, such as a metal–organic complex of Fe^{3+}–tannic acid, have been extensively used in single-cell nanoencapsulation.

=== Metal–organic frameworks ===
A research team, led by Kang Liang, Christian J. Doonan, Frank Caruso, and Paolo Falcaro, crystallized ZIF-8 on the surface of Saccharomyces cerevisiae as an exoskeleton that offered physical protection, while allowing transport of essential nutrients and thus maintaining cell viability, and prevented cell division, leading to an artificially induced pseudo-hibernation state. Cellular functions were fully restored upon shell emoval. The same research team demonstrated the adaptive survival of S. cerevisiae@ZIF-8 under simulated extreme nutrient-depleted conditions by forming ZIF-8 shells that protected cell-surface-adsorbed β-galactosidase, which catalyzed the hydrolysis of environmental lactose into D-glucose and D-galactose.

== Applications ==
=== Cell therapy ===
==== Probiotic delivery ====
A research team led by Yaoyao Zhang, Neel S. Joshi, and Junling Guo nanoencapsulated the probiotic Escherichia coli Nissle 1917 within a metal–organic complex shell composed of Fe^{3+} and tannic acid. The nanoshell protected the probiotic cells from broad-spectrum antibiotics (e.g., levofloxacin), and the nanoencapsulated cells alleviated antibiotic-associated diarrhea and inflammation in animal models.

==== Bacterial therapeutics ====
Jinyao Liu advanced the field of bacterial therapeutics through the formation and functionalization of polydopamine nanoshells.

=== Agricultural innovation ===
==== Microbial fertilizers ====
Ariel Furst's laboratory nanoencapsulated Pseudomonas chlororaphis with a metal–phenolic network of Mn^{2+} and epigallocatechin gallate to protect the nitrogen-fixing bacterium—which could serve as a fertilizer replacement—from harsh industrial processing conditions, including freeze-drying, high temperatures, and high humidity. The nanoencapsulated P. chlororaphis improved seed germination rates by up to 150% in seeds of plants such as dill, corn, radishes, and bok choy, compared with those treated with fresh, uncoated P. chlororaphis.

=== Renewable energy ===
==== Hydrogen production ====
A research team from Xin Huang's and Stephen Mann's laboratories nanoencapsulated individual Chlorella pyrenoidosa within a bilayer shell composed of Fe^{3+}-doped polypyrrole and calcium carbonate. This nanoshell created a localized micro-niche that depleted oxygen and facilitated extracellular electron transport, thereby enabling sustained hydrogen production under daylight and ambient air via metabolic switching from photosynthetic oxygen synthesis under hypoxic conditions. This algal-cell bionic system achieved continuous hydrogen generation for over 200 days in the presence of sodium ascorbate, eosin Y (photosensitizer), and triethanolamine (sacrificial electron donor), and retained activity for 8 days post cell death. Xin Huang's laboratory also constructed a nanoshell around C. pyrenoidosa with polydopamine, laccase, and tannic acid as building blocks, for metabolic switching from normal photosynthetic oxygen production to photobiological hydrogen production.

=== Bioelectronics ===
==== Bioelectrochemical systems ====
A research team led by Joachim Say Chye Loo, Bin Cao, Jian-Rong Zhang, Jun-Jie Zhu, and Qichun Zhang constructed conducting polypyrrole nanoshells on electroactive Shewanella oneidensis MR-1 to enhance the efficiency of extracellular electron transfer between the exoelectrogen and an anode in microbial fuel cells. The nanoencapsulation procedure, which involved Fe^{3+} adsorption onto cell surfaces followed by in situ oxidative polymerization of pyrrole, was mild enough to preserve bacterial viability and was broadly applicable to multiple species, including S. oneidensis MR-1, Escherichia coli, Ochrobactrum anthropi, and Streptococcus thermophilus. The nanoencapsulated S. oneidensis MR-1 exhibited a 23-fold reduction in charge-transfer resistance compared with naïve S. oneidensis MR-1; when used in the microbial fuel cell, the nanoencapsulated S. oneidensis MR-1 produced five times more current and a 14-fold increase in maximum power density (147.9 μW/cm^{2} vs. 9.8 μW/cm^{2}, using an acid-treated carbon cloth electrode).

A research team led by Xuee Wu and Yuan-Peng Wang nanoencapsulated S. xiamenensis within polydopamine shells [Tris-HCl buffer (10 mM, pH 8.0), 3 mg mL^{−1} of dopamine, 3 h]. In addition to its redox properties, the polydopamine shell adsorbed flavins secreted by S. xiamenensis, enabling a double-mediator electron transport channel. The maximum power density was measured to be 452.8 mW/m^{2} for the nanoencapsulated S. xiamenensis (using a carbon felt electrode), 6.1 times higher than that of the naïve S. xiamenensis anode (74.7 mW/m^{2}).

A research team led by Weidong Shi and Yang-Chun Yong nanoencapsulated S. oneidensis MR-1 with polydopamine [Tris-HCl buffer (10 mM, pH 8.5), 4 mg mL^{−1} of dopamine, 3 h] or FeS nanoparticles. FeS-functionalized S. oneidensis MR-1 exhibited better performance than polydopamine-functionalized S. oneidensis MR-1, reaching a maximum power density of 3.21 W/m^{2} (using the conventional carbon felt electrode)—a 14.7-fold increase over naïve S. oneidensis MR-1 (0.207 W/m^{2}). polydopamine-functionalized S. oneidensis MR-1 achieved a maximum power density of 0.66 W/m^{2} under the same microbial fuel cell configuration.

=== Whole-cell bioreactors ===
A research team led by Xiao-Yu Yang, Bo-Bo Zhang, and Bao-Lian Su nanoencapsulated Rhodotorula glutinis, a whole-cell biocatalyst for the production of chiral alcohols, within polydopamine shells [TRIS buffer (pH 8.5, 50 mM), 3 mg mL^{−1} of dopamine, 3 h]. The polydopamine shells acted as redox shuttles during biocatalytic asymmetric reduction. In the asymmetric reduction of acetophenone to (S)-1-phenylethanol, the highest yield achieved by the nanoencapsulated R. glutinis was 79.8%, approximately twice that of naïve R. glutinis (39.7%) after 24 h of reaction. In addition, the productivity of the nanoencapsulated R. glutinis during the initial 9 h reached 0.089 mmol L^{−1} h^{−1}, which was five times higher than that of naïve R. glutinis over the full 24-hour period (0.017 mmol L^{−1} h^{−1}), with significantly enhanced reusability.
