= Sporobolomyces koalae =

Scientific classification
- Kingdom: Fungi
- Division: Basidiomycota
- Class: Microbotryomycetes
- Order: Sporidiobolales
- Family: Sporidiobolaceae
- Genus: Sporobolomyces
- Species: S. koalae

Binomial name
- Sporobolomyces koalae Satoh & Makimura (2008)

Species of fungus

Sporobolomyces koalae is a species of fungus in the order Sporidiobolales. It is an anamorphic yeast. Strains of the yeast were isolated from nasal swabs from three of five captive Queensland koalas (Phascolarctos cinereus) kept at the Kobe Oji Zoo in Kobe, Japan. Swabs from three zoo keepers were examined as well, but tested negative for the presence of the yeast. It is not suspected to be pathogenic, as the koalas from which it was isolated were healthy.

- - - - - - - - - S. ruberrimus
                - S. roseus
              - - S. salmoneus
                - S. marcillae
            - S. phaffi
          - S. pararoseus
        - - S. japonicus
          - - S. carnicolor
            - S. koalae
      - S. blumeae
    - S. bannaensis

Phylogeny and relationships of S. koalae and related Sporobolomyces species based on ribosomal DNA sequences.

Using a suite of standard biochemical and physiological tests, the species was determined to belong to the Sporobolomyces, a genus of uncertain familial placement in the order Sporidiobolales. Using molecular techniques, the researchers prepared a cladogram using internal transcribed spacer sequences, which showed that the collected strains were genetically unique from other Sporobolomyces, and warranted publication as a new species. The yeast clustered in the Johnsonii clade of Sporidiobolus (the teleomorph form of Sporobolomyces).

The cells range in shape from egg-shaped, ellipsoidal, to elongated, measuring 2.5–5.0 by 5.0–15.0 μm, and occurring singly, doubly, or in groups of four. Asymmetrical blastoconidia are borne on short sterigmata, and measure 2.0–5.0 by 3.0–7.0 μm. The optimal growth temperature for the fungus occurs at a range of 28–30 °C (82–86 °F); growth stops at 32 °C (90 °F). Like other Sporobolomyces species, S. koalae has coenzyme Q_{10} as its major ubiquinone, it lacks the monosaccharide xylose in whole-cell hydrolysates, and it cannot ferment sugars. In carbon assimilation tests (used to assess the ability of the yeast to utilize different carbohydrates as its sole source of carbon aerobically), S. koalae was shown to be able to use glucose, sucrose, maltose, cellobiose, raffinose, soluble starch, D-mannitol, and succinic acid; it has a weak ability to use trehalose, melezitose, inulin, L-arabinose, glycerine, D-sorbitol, salicin, and D-gluconate. It can use ammonium sulphate and potassium nitrate as nitrogen sources.
