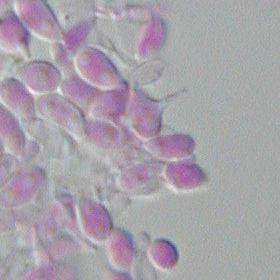
- Ballistoconidia of Sporobolomyces salmonicolor

Scientific classification
- Kingdom: Fungi
- Division: Basidiomycota
- Class: Microbotryomycetes
- Order: Sporidiobolales
- Family: Sporidiobolaceae
- Genus: Sporobolomyces; Kluyver & C.B.Niel (1924)

Type species
- Sporobolomyces roseus Kluyver & C.B.Niel (1924)

Synonyms
- Amphiernia Grüss (1927); Blastoderma B.Fisch. & Brebeck (1894); Prosporobolomyces E.K.Novák & Zsolt (1961); Sporidiobolus Nyland (1950)

= Sporobolomyces =

Genus of fungi

Sporobolomyces is a genus of fungi in the subdivision Pucciniomycotina. It is also known as "mirror yeast", due to its forceful ejection of its spores, which can create a "mirror image" of a growing colony when grown between two opposing agar surfaces.

Species produce both yeast states and hyphal states. The latter form teliospores, from which auricularioid (tubular and laterally septate) basidia emerge, bearing basidiospores. Yeast colonies are salmon-pink to red. Sporobolomyces species occur worldwide and have been isolated (as yeasts) from a wide variety of substrates. They produce ballistoconidia that are bilaterally symmetrical, they have Coenzyme Q_{10} or Coenzyme Q_{10}(H_{2}) as their major ubiquinone, they lack xylose in whole-cell hydrolysates, and they cannot ferment sugars. One species, Sporobolomyces salmonicolor, is known to cause disease in humans.

== Species ==
Molecular research, based on cladistic analysis of DNA sequences, has shown that Sporobolomyces sensu stricto is a monophyletic (natural) genus, but that many species previously placed in the genus belong elsewhere. The teleomorphic (hyphal) state was formerly referred to the genus Sporidiobolus, but, following changes to the International Code of Nomenclature for algae, fungi, and plants, the practice of giving different names to teleomorph and anamorph forms of the same fungus was discontinued, meaning that Sporidiobolus became a synonym of the earlier name Sporobolomyces.

- S. agrorum
- S. bannaensis
- S. beijingensis
- S. blumeae
- S. carnicolor
- S. cellobiolyticus
- S. ellipsoideus
- S. japonicus
- S. jilinensis
- S. johnsonii
- S. koalae
- S. longiusculus
- S. musae
- S. patagonicus
- S. phafii
- S. primogenomicus
- S. reniformis
- S. roseus
- S. ruberrimus
- S. salmoneus
- S. salmonicolor
- S. shibatanus
- S. sucorum
