= Pink mold =

Pink mold refers to several microbiological organisms, some of which are bacteria instead of molds:

- Aspergillus niger, a species of mold that can cause pink mold on spoiled vegetables
- Fusarium ear blight, a plant disease caused by Fusarium species
- Microdochium, a genus that causes pink mold on wheat and other grasses
- Neurospora, a genus of mold that can appear pink on bread
- Sporobolomyces salmonicolor, a yeast that causes pink mold
- Serratia marcescens, a waterborne bacteria (not technically a mold) that is commonly found in bathrooms and damp rooms
- Trichothecium roseum, a species of mold that causes pink mold on damaged nuts and fruits
