= Rhodotorula toruloides =

Scientific classification
- Kingdom: Fungi
- Division: Basidiomycota
- Class: Microbotryomycetes
- Order: Sporidiobolales
- Family: Sporidiobolaceae
- Genus: Rhodotorula
- Species: R. toruloides

Binomial name
- Rhodotorula toruloides (I. Banno) Q.M. Wang, F.Y. Bai, M. Groenew. & Boekhout (2015)

Synonyms
- Rhodosporidium toruloides I. Banno (1967)

Species of fungus

Rhodotorula toruloides is a species of oleaginous yeast. It is a red basidiomycete isolated from the wood pulp of conifers and naturally accumulates carotenoids, neutral lipids, and enzymes relevant to the chemical and pharmaceutical industries. It is able to metabolize all major components of lignocellulosic biomass (cellulose, hemicellulose, and lignin) and is a potential host for metabolic engineering to produce terpenes and fatty acids. R. toruloides accumulates lipids within intracellular lipid bodies under nutrient-limiting conditions and could potentially be a source for engineering of lipid-production pathways.

R. toruloides has been linked to bovine mastitis, but its epidemiology has not yet been reported.
