= Rhodotorula evergladiensis =

Scientific classification
- Domain: Eukaryota
- Kingdom: Fungi
- Division: Basidiomycota
- Class: Microbotryomycetes
- Order: Sporidiobolales
- Family: Sporidiobolaceae
- Genus: Rhodotorula
- Species: R. evergladiensis

Binomial name
- Rhodotorula evergladiensis Fell et al. 2011

Species of fungus

Rhodotorula evergladiensis is a yeast species first found in the Florida Everglades.
