= Rhodosporidiobolus fluvialis =

Scientific classification
- Domain: Eukaryota
- Kingdom: Fungi
- Division: Basidiomycota
- Class: Microbotryomycetes
- Order: Sporidiobolales
- Family: Sporidiobolaceae
- Genus: Rhodosporidiobolus
- Species: R. fluvialis

Binomial name
- Rhodosporidiobolus fluvialis (Fell, Kurtzman, Tallman & J.D.Buck) Q.M.Wang, F.Y.Bai, M.Groenew. & Boekhout

Synonyms
- Rhodosporidium fluviale Fell, Kurtzman, Tallman & J.D. Buck 1988

Fungal species

Rhodosporidiobolus fluvialis is a species of fungus in the family Sporidiobolaceae. It is a human fungal pathogen that exhibits resistance to antifungal compounds like fluconazole and caspofungin.

== Antifungal resistance ==
Rhodosporidiobolus fluvialis was isolated from two independent patients. It can proliferate well at 37 °C (99 °F), a temperature similar to the human body's internal temperature. When it is incubated at 37 °C (99 °F), reactive oxygen species accumulate and damage its DNA, which causes mutations that lead to the development of resistance to amphotericin-B.

R. fluvialis colonies can be pigmented due to the accumulation of carotenoids in the cells. Carotenoid production has been associated with its resistance to caspofungin.
