= Aessosporon =

Scientific classification
- Kingdom: Fungi
- Division: Basidiomycota
- Class: Microbotryomycetes
- Order: Sporidiobolales
- Family: Sporidiobolaceae
- Genus: Aessosporon; Van der Walt 1970

Species
- Aessosporon dendrophilum Aessosporon salmonicolor

Genus of fungi

Aessosporon is a genus of Basidiomycota found in the family Sporidiobolaceae. It contains the two species Aessosporon dendrophilum and Aessosporon salmonicolor.
