= Bioprinting drug delivery =

Method of producing drug-delivery vehicles

Bioprinting drug delivery is a method for producing drug delivery vehicles. It uses 3D printing of biomaterials. Such vehicles are biocompatible, tissue-specific hydrogels or implantable devices. 3D bioprinting prints cells and biological molecules to form tissues, organs, or biological materials in a scaffold-free manner that mimics living human tissue. The technique allows targeted disease treatments with scalable and complex geometry.

This technique was first developed in the 1950s as patients with incurable diseases sought organ transplantations beyond those available from donors. Organ transplantation showed limitations with immune responses and organ rejection.

Techniques that have been studied include bioprinting hydrogels with various bio-ink (cell-laden microgel) materials and bioprinting implantable devices that mimic specific tissues or biological functions. Applications include promoting wound healing by delivering antibiotics, anti-inflammatory treatments, or drugs that promote cell differentiation and cell proliferation, providing anticancer treatments directly to tumors, and promoting/inhibiting angiogenesis and vascularization to treat cancer, arterial diseases, heart diseases, and arthritis. In addition, implants can be printed in unique shapes and forms to deliver drugs directly to targeted tissues. One approach adds a fourth dimension, which allows the materials to conform, by folding/unfolding, to release drugs in a more controlled manner. Bioprinting allows for biocompatible, biodegradable, universal, and personalized delivery vehicles.

== Methods ==
Layer-by-layer printing of biochemicals and living cells requires precise placement and viable materials. The basic technology of a bioprinter starts with data taken from computer-assisted design (CAD) or a similar program, uses motion control systems to control the X/Y/Z axis direction drive mechanisms along with a material control system for the bio-ink printhead, and deposits material into a 3D construct. Bioprinting can be done by material jetting, material extrusion, or vat polymerization.

=== Jetting ===
Material jetting, sometimes referred to as fused deposition modeling (FDM), is a method that involves depositing cells using piezoelectric/thermal ink-jetting, acoustic wave jetting, electrohydrodynamic jetting, or laser-induced forward transfer (LIFT). Piezoelectric/thermal ink-jetting uses the same non-contact process as desktop inkjet printers by pressuring material into a nozzle that expels droplets. Acoustic wave jetting uses acoustic radiation force to produce droplets; electrohydrodynamic jetting uses electric voltage to form droplets; and LIFT is replaces nozzles with a laser and generates a high-pressure bubble that propels droplets. These methods provide precise placement of the bioink and enable scaffold-free bioprinting.

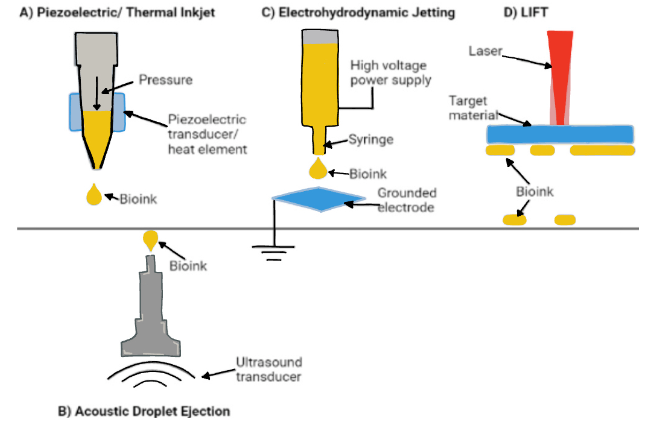

=== Extrusion ===
Another method of bioprinting is extrusion. This is a mechanical method that uses motors to drive a piston. Extrusion is based on the rate of the motor's displacement, where the difference between the piston-driven pressure and ambient pressure drives the material through an angular turn of a rotary screw.

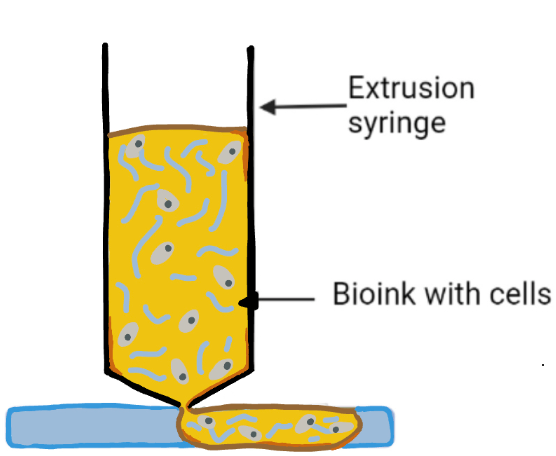

=== Vat polymerization ===
Vat polymerization printing (VPP) uses a cell-hydrogel suspension. The constructs are formed layer-by-layer through laser curing in stereolithography (SLA) or UV digital light processing (DLP) into the vat of a photopolymer using a micromirror device.

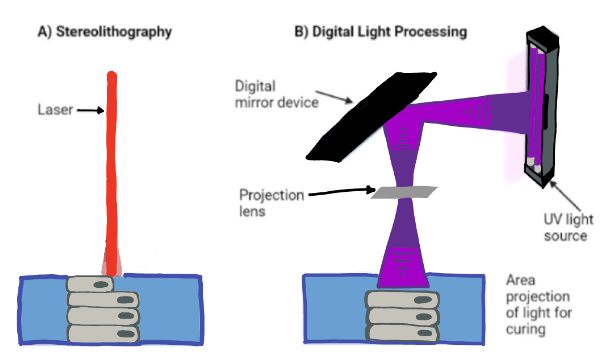

== Hydrogels ==
Hydrogels are three-dimensional polymeric networks that can maintain their structure while absorbing large amounts of water or biological fluids. Hydrogels can be made of many different synthetic polymers or natural polysaccharides. These have been widely studied due to their similarities to the human extracellular matrix (ECM) and their ability to encapsulate drugs. They are mainly printed using jetting and extrusion.

=== Alginates ===
A common polysaccharide used in biomedical hydrogel applications is alginate, a naturally occurring polyanionic copolymer. The structure and high water absorption of alginate provides a tissue environment that closely mimics human soft tissue. In addition, it is an ideal candidate for biomedical applications due to its natural biodegradability and biocompatibility. This hydrogel leverages the delivery of drugs, protects drugs with encapsulation, and allows for tunable drug release and degradability

To construct alginate hydrogels, a series of negatively and positively charged polyelectrolytes are assembled layer-by-layer. Alginate is used as the matrix in bio-ink that is extruded from the bioprinter's syringe with increasing shear, resulting in a tough hydrogel with low viscosity. Depending on the surrounding medium, alginate has the potential to form two different types of gels. Low-pH alginate shrinks and produces a viscous acidic gel, holding onto encapsulated drugs. Once the pH increases, such as inside an intestinal tract, alginate turns into a viscose gel that allows drug dissolution and release. This process allows for a controlled and sustained release to specific tissues.

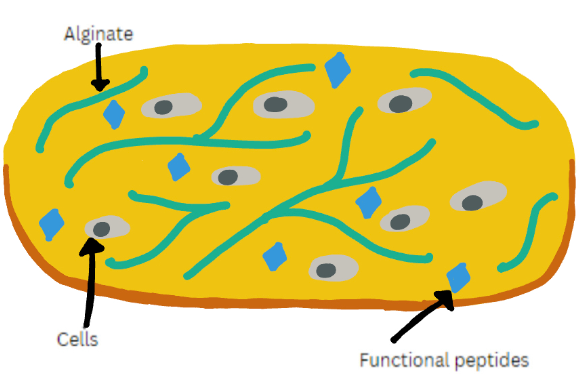

One 2018 study used alginate-based hydrogels combined with the growth factor platelet-rich plasma (PRP) to develop a bio-ink with personalized biological factors. The plasms was extracted from specific patients, then mixed with the alginate solution. The solution was coated with calcium chloride agarose gel. The result was a hydrogel disk that had decreased the risk of immune responses from the patient. The disk showed potential for promoting mesenchymal stem cells and endothelial cells in tissue healing. The study reported that PRP and alginate hydrogel bio-ink could be used by any bioprinter to produce personalized drug delivery therapies.

The hydrogel can be loaded with any drug, and target any tissue. The low toxicity and controllable factors of alginate make it a suitable candidate for hydrogel incorporation. Alginate hydrogels have been used to deliver bortezomib, an anticancer drug, tetracycline hydrochloride and silver sulfadiazine, which are hydrophobic antibiotics, and simvastatin, which promotes local stem cell differentiation.

=== Peptides ===
Another bio-ink is low molecular weight self-assembling peptide-based materials. Peptide-based hydrogels are candidates for bio-inks since they resemble the ECM. In addition, their mechanical strength and stiffness of up to 40 kPa allow for strong and rigid hydrogels.

A 2019 study used the "helical coiling of micelles induced by disulfide crosslinking in a lyotropic peptide liquid crystal" to produce a printable hydrogel. They reported that the tripeptide self-assembled into a viscous solution of aligned micelles at high pH values that could be transformed into a self-supporting hydrogel when the cross-linking of the sulfhydryl group of the side chain peptides increased the storage modulus of the solution.

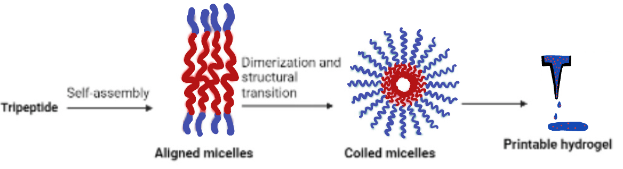

These self-assembling peptides provide beneficial organization and strength. In addition, their resemblance to the native cellular microenvironment and tunable mechanical strength allow them to support the proliferation of human stem cells. Using self-assembling peptides to print hydrogels provides drug delivery vehicles that represent the ECM and potentially differentiate primary cells into organotypic structures and deliver antimicrobial, anti-inflammatory, anticancer, and wound healing drugs. Specifically, hydrogels made of such peptides have been studied to encapsulate chemotherapy drugs that can disassemble and release the loaded drug under the stimulation of tumor environments, providing an alternative to typical chemotherapy that inevitably damages healthy cells, while killing cancer cells.

=== Protein ===
Common protein-based bio-inks include collagen, keratin, gelatin, and silk. These proteins are advantageous since they are in the ECM and display good cytocompatibility, biocompatibility, and biodegradability. They are all derived from natural sources, are isolated with different methods, and have various advantages and disadvantages. Collagen is typically printed using extrusion or SLA and provides good structural responses and esion for cells. Silk is printed using digital light processing, and provides strength and robustness. One disadvantage of silk is its potential to conform in response to high shear forces. Gelatin is printed using extrusion and provides good cellular affinity, however, its covalent crosslinking-based stabilization requires chemical reactions that are not cytocompatible. Overall, protein-based bio-inks are abundant, inexpensive, biocompatible, and biodegradable, and are in common use for 3D bioprinting. Advantages of protein-based bio-inks over synthetic bio-inks include their similarity to human host tissue and their ability to match their degradation rate with the regeneration of host tissue.

Comparisons
Protein	Source(s)	Printing Method	Advantages	Disadvantages
Silk	Silkworm	Digital light processing	High strength and robustness. High solubility and printing fidelity.	Conforms at high shear forces, so not suitable for printing at low concentrations.
Keratin	Spider, sheep wool, and human hair	Extrusion	High strength and fidelity. Good cell adherence and viability.	Can be difficult to achieve and have varying properties in humid air.
Gelatin	Gelatin	Extrusion	Good cellular affinity and proliferation.	Requires non-cytocompatible chemical reactions and has a risk of degradation at high temperatures.
Collagen	Porcine and fish	Extrusion or SLA	Good structural responses and cell adhesion. High porosity and tensile strength.	Possible lack of biocompatibility and immunogenicity concerns.

==== Applications ====
Multiple protein applications use bio-inks for 3D printing. A 2014 study bioprinted cell-laden methacrylated gelatin (GelMA) hydrogels at concentrations ranging from 7 to 15% with varying cell densities. The study used "direct-write bioprinting of cell-laden photolabile ECM-derived hydrogels". They reported a direct correlation between printability and hydrogel mechanical properties. A commercially available bioprinter dispensed the GelMA hydrogel fibers using digital light processing since GelMA is photosensitive. The hydrogels provided cell viability for at least eight days.

Other research includes gelatin-sulfonated skin composite tissue to deliver cells to open wounds by seeding matrices. Doing this helps wounds to heal faster and more efficiently. Gelatin hydrogels have successfully delivered fluorescein, a hydrophobic molecule, and microRNA to promote osteogenic cell differentiation. Silk has successfully delivered aspirin, an anti-inflammatory drug that aids in wound dressing, and gentamicin, an antibiotic that also aids in wound dressing.

=== Nanocellulose ===
Another bio-ink that has been successful in producing drug delivery systems via bioprinting is cellulosic nanomaterials. Cellulose-based bio-inks are accessible, inexpensive, biodegradable, biocompatible, and stiff. A polysaccharide is obtained from the biosynthesis of plants and bacteria. It is extracted from raw materials with mechanical shearing actions and biological treatments, such as hydrolysis, resulting in highly structured nanofibrils. Cellulose materials are defined by their high viscosity and shear-thinning behavior.

One 2015 study used nanocellulose bio-inks as wound dressings. Extrusion produced porous structures with ionic calcium chloride cross-linking. These porous hydrogels were reported to support bacterial growth and incorporate and release antimicrobial drugs. These structures provide strong, moist environments that are ideal for delivering drugs to tissues that require wound healing aid.

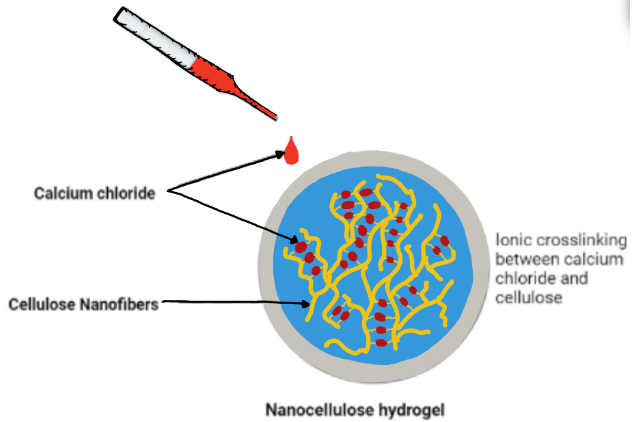
Nanocellulose cross-linked with calcium chloride printed on a nanocellulose hydrogel film.

== Non-hydrogel implants ==
Non-hydrogel delivery systems implants are printed in the same manner as hydrogels. A 2022 study used SLA 3D printing to produce an implant to deliver drugs to the ear. 0.5% levofloxacin was added to a flexible resin. Mechanical and in vitro tests measured levofloxacin release. The results showed no interaction between the resin and the drug, the resistance of the implant without compromise, and high antimicrobial activity. Antibiotics were delivered directly to the inner ear to address infection.

Researchers studied a printed bladder device for intravesical drug delivery. Intravesical instillation provides an alternative to oral medication and delivers high drug concentrations to specific sites. Studies reported the use indwelling bladder devices with an elastic polymer bio-ink to deliver lidocaine hydrochloride directly to the target site.

One study deposited perfusable vascular structures with a cell-responsive bio-ink that consisted of GelMA, sodium alginate, and poly(ethylene glycol)-tetra-acrylate (PEGTA). The study reported that this supported the spreading and proliferation of encapsulated endothelial and stem cells, leading to the formation of perfusable vessels. These may lead to the application of vascularized tissue constructs in organ transplantation and repair. Bioprinting vascular structures may lead to treatments for cancer, arterial disease, heart disease, and arthritis by regulating vascularization and angiogenesis.

=== Nanocellulose ===
Cellulose nanofibrils have been used as a bio-ink for non-hydrogel applications. A 2017 study evaluated the use of bioprinting cellulose as drug-loaded implants. Researchers used FDM to evaluate drug release behavior. Fluorescent dye quinine was used to visualize the distribution of drugs in the implants. Quinine filaments were loaded into bio-printed cellulose implants and then incubated to observe their drug-release behaviors. The study reported showed that around 5% of the quinine was released from the cellulose implant over 100 days. Using cellulose nanofibrils might provide implants with customizable shapes and controlled release of loaded drugs via FDM.

== 4D bioprinting ==
One study added a fourth dimension to the devices, which allows printed objects to change their shapes and functions as external factors are applied, broadening the range of biomedical applications as cellular self-organization becomes possible. This technique allows for more advanced control of drug release. Studies have reported results in the use of responsive materials and bio-inks. Responsive materials can reshape in response to stimuli, such as transforming via self-folding, assembling, and disassembling. Certain bio-inks have been reported to undergo maturation with cellular coating, self-organization, and matrix deposition.

=== Applications ===
Examples include a self-folding hydrogel in vitro model for ductal carcinoma. The study attempted to create a self-folding curved hydrogel microstructure to mimic the geometry of ducts and acini within mammary glands. The researchers used microstructures composed of poly(ethylene glycol)-diacrylate (PEGDA) and copolymerized the PEGDA to synthesize microstructures with increased cell adherence. Curved and tubular structures were fabricated via bioprinting, and the proliferation of cells on the outer surface, along with encapsulation of cells on the inner surface, was observed.

4D printing with thermally actuating hydrogels was reported to be relatively fast and reversible with skeletal muscle-like linear actuation in tough hydrogel materials that control the flow of water. Other examples include the usage of water absorption and thermal shape memory to demonstrate shape change. A 2015 study considered a 4D-printed capsule system that could release drugs on-demand at specific locations with a core-shell hydrogel. A 2014 study evaluated thermo-responsive poly(propylene fumarate) (PPF)-based system that released drugs in a controlled manner for treating the gastrointestinal tract.
