= Rhodosporidiobolus =

Scientific classification
- Domain: Eukaryota
- Kingdom: Fungi
- Division: Basidiomycota
- Class: Microbotryomycetes
- Order: Sporidiobolales
- Family: Sporidiobolaceae
- Genus: Rhodosporidiobolus; Q.M.Wang, F.Y.Bai, M.Groenew. & Boekhout, 2015

Genus of fungus

Rhodosporidiobolus is a genus of fungus.

== Species ==
The following species are acknowledged in this genus:

- Rhodosporidiobolus azoricus (J.P.Samp. & Gadanho) Q.M.Wang, F.Y.Bai, M.Groenew. & Boekhout
- Rhodosporidiobolus colostri (T.Castelli) Q.M.Wang, F.Y.Bai, M.Groenew. & Boekhout
- Rhodosporidiobolus fluvialis (Fell, Kurtzman, Tallman & J.D.Buck) Q.M.Wang, F.Y.Bai, M.Groenew. & Boekhout
- Rhodosporidiobolus fuzhouensis Q.M.Wang, F.Y.Bai & A.H.Li
- Rhodosporidiobolus geoffroeae Masiulionis & Pagnocca
- Rhodosporidiobolus jianfalingensis Q.M.Wang, F.Y.Bai & A.H.Li
- Rhodosporidiobolus lusitaniae (Á.Fonseca & J.P.Samp.) Q.M.Wang, F.Y.Bai, M.Groenew. & Boekhout
- Rhodosporidiobolus microsporus (Higham ex Fell, Blatt & Statzell) Q.M.Wang, F.Y.Bai, M.Groenew. & Boekhout
- Rhodosporidiobolus nylandii (M.Takash. & Nakase) Q.M.Wang, F.Y.Bai, M.Groenew. & Boekhout
- Rhodosporidiobolus odoratus (J.P.Samp., Á.Fonseca & E.Valério) Q.M.Wang, F.Y.Bai, M.Groenew. & Boekhout
- Rhodosporidiobolus oreadorum Zalar, J.P.Samp. & Gunde-Cim.
- Rhodosporidiobolus platycladi Q.M.Wang, F.Y.Bai & A.H.Li
- Rhodosporidiobolus poonsookiae (M.Takash. & Nakase) Q.M.Wang, F.Y.Bai, M.Groenew. & Boekhout
- Rhodosporidiobolus ruineniae (Holzschu, Tredick & Phaff) Q.M.Wang, F.Y.Bai, M.Groenew. & Boekhout
