= Cell encapsulation =

Cell encapsulation is a possible solution to graft rejection in tissue engineering applications. Cell microencapsulation technology involves immobilization of cells within a polymeric semi-permeable membrane. It permits the bidirectional diffusion of molecules such as the influx of oxygen, nutrients, growth factors etc. essential for cell metabolism and the outward diffusion of waste products and therapeutic proteins. At the same time, the semi-permeable nature of the membrane prevents immune cells and antibodies from destroying the encapsulated cells, regarding them as foreign invaders. On the other hand, single-cell nanoencapsulation (SCNE) involves the formation of nanometric shells around individual living cells.

Cell encapsulation could reduce the need for long-term use of immunosuppressive drugs after an organ transplant to control side effects.

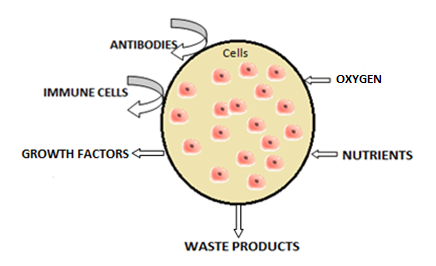
Schematic illustrating cell microencapsulation

== History ==
In 1933 Vincenzo Bisceglie made the first attempt to encapsulate cells in polymer membranes. He demonstrated that tumor cells in a polymer structure transplanted into pig abdominal cavity remained viable for a long period without being rejected by the immune system.

Thirty years later in 1964, the idea of encapsulating cells within ultra thin polymer membrane microcapsules so as to provide immunoprotection to the cells was then proposed by Thomas Chang who introduced the term "artificial cells" to define this concept of bioencapsulation. He suggested that these artificial cells produced by a drop method not only protected the encapsulated cells from immunorejection but also provided a high surface-to-volume relationship enabling good mass transfer of oxygen and nutrients. Twenty years later, this approach was successfully put into practice in small animal models when alginate-polylysine-alginate (APA) microcapsules immobilizing xenograft islet cells were developed. The study demonstrated that when these microencapsulated islets were implanted into diabetic rats, the cells remained viable and controlled glucose levels for several weeks. Human trials utilising encapsulated cells were performed in 1998. Encapsulated cells expressing a cytochrome P450 enzyme to locally activate an anti-tumour prodrug were used in a trial for advanced, non-resectable pancreatic cancer. Approximately a doubling of survival time compared to historic controls was demonstrated.

== Cell microencapsulation as a tool for tissue engineering and regenerative medicine ==
Questions could arise as to why the technique of encapsulation of cells is even required when therapeutic products could just be injected at the site. An important reason for this is that the encapsulated cells would provide a source of sustained continuous release of therapeutic products for longer durations at the site of implantation. Another advantage of cell microencapsulation technology is that it allows the loading of non-human and genetically modified cells into the polymer matrix when the availability of donor cells is limited. Microencapsulation is a valuable technique for local, regional and oral delivery of therapeutic products as it can be implanted into numerous tissue types and organs. For prolonged drug delivery to the treatment site, implantation of these drug loaded artificial cells would be more cost effective in comparison to direct drug delivery. Moreover, the prospect of implanting artificial cells with similar chemical composition in several patients irrespective of their leukocyte antigen could again allow reduction in costs.

== Key parameters of cell microencapsulation technology ==
The potential of using cell microencapsulation in successful clinical applications can be realized only if several requirements encountered during the development process are optimized such as the use of an appropriate biocompatible polymer to form the mechanically and chemically stable semi-permeable matrix, production of uniformly sized microcapsules, use of an appropriate immune-compatible polycations cross-linked to the encapsulation polymer to stabilized the capsules, selection of a suitable cell type depending on the situation.

=== Biomaterials ===
The use of the best biomaterial depending on the application is crucial in the development of drug delivery systems and tissue engineering. The polymer alginate is very commonly used due to its early discovery, easy availability and low cost but other materials such as cellulose sulphate, collagen, chitosan, gelatin and agarose have also been employed.

==== Alginate ====
Several groups have extensively studied several natural and synthetic polymers with the goal of developing the most suitable biomaterial for cell microencapsulation. Extensive work has been done using alginates which are regarded as the most suitable biomaterials for cell microencapsulation due to their abundance, excellent biocompatibility and biodegradability properties. Alginate is a natural polymer which can be extracted from seaweed and bacteria with numerous compositions based on the isolation source.

Alginate is not free from all criticism. Some researchers believe that alginates with high-M content could produce an inflammatory response and an abnormal cell growth while some have demonstrated that alginate with high-G content lead to an even higher cell overgrowth and inflammatory reaction in vivo as compared to intermediate-G alginates. Even ultrapure alginates may contain endotoxins, and polyphenols which could compromise the biocompatibility of the resultant cell microcapsules. It has been shown that even though purification processes successfully lower endotoxin and polyphenol content in the processed alginate, it is difficult to lower the protein content and the purification processes could in turn modify the properties of the biomaterial. Thus it is essential that an effective purification process is designed so as to remove all the contaminants from alginate before it can be successfully used in clinical applications.

===== Modification and functionalization of alginate =====
Researchers have also been able to develop alginate microcapsules with an altered form of alginate with enhanced biocompatibility and higher resistance to osmotic swelling. Another approach to increasing the biocompatibility of the membrane biomaterial is through surface modification of the capsules using peptide and protein molecules which in turn controls the proliferation and rate of differentiation of the encapsulated cells. One group that has been working extensively on coupling the amino acid sequence Arg-Gly-Asp (RGD) to alginate hydrogels demonstrated that the cell behavior can be controlled by the RGD density coupled on the alginate gels. Alginate microparticles loaded with myoblast cells and functionalized with RGD allowed control over the growth and differentiation of the loaded cells. Another vital factor that controls the use of cell microcapsules in clinical applications is the development of a suitable immune-compatible polycation to coat the otherwise highly porous alginate beads and thus impart stability and immune protection to the system. Poly-L-lysine is the most commonly used polycation but its low biocompatibility restricts the successful clinical use of these PLL formulated microcapsules which attract inflammatory cells thus inducing necrosis of the loaded cells. Studies have also shown that alginate-PLL-alginate (APA) microcapsules demonstrate low mechanical stability and short term durability. Thus several research groups have been looking for alternatives to PLL and have demonstrated promising results with poly-L-ornithine and poly(methylene-co-guanidine) hydrochloride by fabricating durable microcapsules with high and controlled mechanical strength for cell encapsulation.

Several groups have also investigated the use of chitosan which is a naturally derived polycation as a potential replacement for PLL to fabricate alginate-chitosan (AC) microcapsules for cell delivery applications. However, studies have also shown that the stability of this AC membrane is again limited and one group demonstrated that modification of this alginate-chitosan microcapsules with genipin, a naturally occurring iridoid glucoside from gardenia fruits, to form genipin cross-linked alginate-chitosan (GCAC) microcapsules could augment stability of the cell loaded microcapsules.

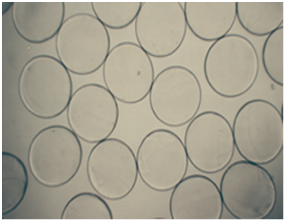
Microphotographs of the alginate-chitosan (AC) microcapsules

==== Collagen ====
Collagen, a major protein component of the ECM, provides support to tissues like skin, cartilage, bones, blood vessels and ligaments and is thus considered a model scaffold or matrix for tissue engineering due to its properties of biocompatibility, biodegradability and ability to promote cell binding. This ability allows chitosan to control distribution of cells inside the polymeric system. Thus, Type-I collagen obtained from animal tissues is now successfully being used commercially as tissue engineered biomaterial for multiple applications. Collagen has also been used in nerve repair and bladder engineering. Immunogenicity has limited the applications of collagen. Gelatin has been considered as an alternative for that reason.

==== Gelatin ====
Gelatin is prepared from the denaturation of collagen and many desirable properties such as biodegradability, biocompatibility, non-immunogenity in physiological environments, and easy processability make this polymer a good choice for tissue engineering applications. It is used in engineering tissues for the skin, bone and cartilage and is used commercially for skin replacements.

==== Chitosan ====
Chitosan is a polysaccharide composed of randomly distributed β-(1-4)-linked D-glucosamine (deacetylated unit) and N-acetyl-D-glucosamine (acetylated unit). It is derived from the N-deacetylation of chitin and has been used for several applications such as drug delivery, space-filling implants and in wound dressings. However, one drawback of this polymer is its weak mechanical properties and is thus often combined with other polymers such collagen to form a polymer with stronger mechanical properties for cell encapsulation applications.

==== Agarose ====
Agarose is a polysaccharide derived from seaweed used for nanoencapsulation of cells and the cell/agarose suspension can be modified to form microbeads by reducing the temperature during preparation. However, one drawback with the microbeads so obtained is the possibility of cellular protrusion through the polymeric matrix wall after formation of the capsules.

==== Cellulose Sulphate ====
Cellulose sulphate is derived from cotton and, once processed appropriately, can be used as a biocompatible base in which to suspend cells. When the poly-anionic cellulose sulphate solution is immersed in a second, poly-cationic solution (e.g. pDADMAC), a semi-permeable membrane is formed around the suspended cells as a result of gelation between the two poly-ions. Both mammalian cell lines and bacterial cells remain viable and continue to replicate within the capsule membrane in order to fill-out the capsule. As such, in contrast to some other encapsulation materials, the capsules can be used to grow cells and act as such like a mini-bioreactor. The biocompatible nature of the material has been demonstrated by observation during studies using the cell-filled capsules themselves for implantation as well as isolated capsule material. Capsules formed from cellulose sulphate have been successfully used, showing safety and efficacy, in clinical and pre-clinical trials in both humans and animals, primarily as anti-cancer treatments, but also exploring possible uses for gene therapy or antibody therapies. Using cellulose sulphate it has been possible to manufacture encapsulated cells as a pharmaceutical product at large scale and fulfilling Good Manufacturing Process (cGMP) standards. This was achieved by the company Austrianova in 2007.

=== Biocompatibility ===
The use of an ideal high quality biomaterial with the inherent properties of biocompatibility is the most crucial factor that governs the long term efficiency of this technology. An ideal biomaterial for cell encapsulation should be one that is totally biocompatible, does not trigger an immune response in the host and does not interfere with cell homeostasis so as to ensure high cell viability. However, one major limitation has been the inability to reproduce the different biomaterials and the requirements to obtain a better understanding of the chemistry and biofunctionality of the biomaterials and the microencapsulation system. Several studies demonstrate that surface modification of these cell containing microparticles allows control over the growth and cellular differentiation. of the encapsulated cells.

One study proposed the use of zeta potential which measures the electric charge of the microcapsule as a means to predict the interfacial reaction between microcapsule and the surrounding tissue and in turn the biocompatibility of the delivery system.

=== Microcapsule permeability ===
A fundamental criterion that must be established while developing any device with a semi-permeable membrane is to adjust the permeability of the device in terms of entry and exit of molecules. It is essential that the cell microcapsule is designed with uniform thickness and should have a control over both the rate of molecules entering the capsule necessary for cell viability and the rate of therapeutic products and waste material exiting the capsule membrane. Immunoprotection of the loaded cell is the key issue that must be kept in mind while working on the permeability of the encapsulation membrane as not only immune cells but also antibodies and cytokines should be prevented entry into the microcapsule which in fact depends on the pore size of the biomembrane.

It has been shown that since different cell types have different metabolic requirements, thus depending on the cell type encapsulated in the membrane the permeability of the membrane has to be optimized. Several groups have been dedicated towards the study of membrane permeability of cell microcapsules and although the role of permeability of certain essential elements like oxygen has been demonstrated, the permeability requirements of each cell type are yet to be determined.

Sodium Citrate is used for degradation of alginate beads after encapsulation of cells. In order to determine viability of the cells or for further experimentation. Concentrations of approximately 25mM are used to dissolve the alginate spheres and the solution is spun down using a centrifuge so the sodium citrate can be removed and the cells can be collected.

=== Mechanical strength and durability ===
It is essential that the microcapsules have adequate membrane strength (mechanical stability) to endure physical and osmotic stress such as during the exchange of nutrients and waste products. The microcapsules should be strong enough and should not rupture on implantation as this could lead to an immune rejection of the encapsulated cells. For instance, in the case of xenotransplantation, a tighter more stable membrane would be required in comparison to allotransplantation. Also, while investigating the potential of using APA microcapsules loaded with bile salt hydrolase (BSH) overproducing active Lactobacillus plantarum 80 cells, in a simulated gastro intestinal tract model for oral delivery applications, the mechanical integrity and shape of the microcapsules was evaluated. It was shown that APA microcapsules could potentially be used in the oral delivery of live bacterial cells. However, further research proved that the GCAC microcapsules possess a higher mechanical stability as compared to APA microcapsules for oral delivery applications. Martoni et al. were experimenting with bacteria-filled capsules that would be taken by mouth to reduce serum cholesterol. The capsules were pumped through a series of vessels simulating the human GI tract to determine how well the capsules would survive in the body. Extensive research into the mechanical properties of the biomaterial to be used for cell microencapsulation is necessary to determine the durability of the microcapsules during production and especially for in vivo applications where a sustained release of the therapeutic product over long durations is required. van der Wijngaart et al. grafted a solid, but permeable, shell around the cells to provide increased mechanical strength.

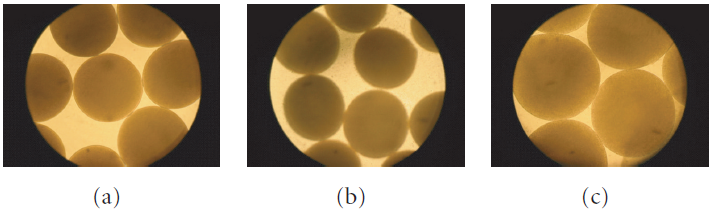
Illustration of the APA microcapsule integrity and morphological changes during simulated GI transit. (a) Pre-stomach transit. (b) Post-stomach transit (60 minutes). (c) Post-stomach (60 minutes) and intestinal (10-hour) transit. Microcapsule size: (a) 608 ± 36 μm (b) 544 ± 40 μm (c) 725 ± 55 μm. From Martoni et al. (2007).

Sodium Citrate is used for degradation of alginate beads after encapsulation of cells. In order to determine viability of the cells or for further experimentation. Concentrations of approximately 25mM are used to dissolve the alginate spheres and the solution is spun down using a centrifuge so the sodium citrate can be removed and the cells can be collected.

=== Methods for testing mechanical properties of microcapsules ===
- A Rheometer is a machine used to test
  - shear rate
  - shear strength
  - consistency coefficient
  - flow behavior index
- Viscometer - shear strength testing

=== Microcapsule Generation ===
==== Microfluidics ====
Droplet-based microfluidics can be used to generate microparticles with repeatable size.

- manipulation of alginate solution to allow microcapsules to be created

==== Electrospraying Techniques ====
Eletrospraying is used to create alginate spheres by pumping an alginate solution through a needle. A source of high voltage usually provided by a clamp attached to the needle is used to generate an electric potential with the alginate falling from the needle tip into a solution that contains a ground. Calcium chloride is used as cross linking solution in which the generated capsules drop into where they harden after approximately 30 minutes. Beads are formed from the needle due to charge and surface tension.

- Size dependency of the beads
  - height alterations of device from needle to calcium chloride solution
  - voltage alterations of clamp on the needle
  - alginate concentration alterations

=== Microcapsule size ===
The diameter of the microcapsules is an important factor that influences both the immune response towards the cell microcapsules as well as the mass transport across the capsule membrane. Studies show that the cellular response to smaller capsules is much lesser as compared to larger capsules and in general the diameter of the cell loaded microcapsules should be between 350-450 μm so as to enable effective diffusion across the semi-permeable membrane.

=== Cell choice ===
The cell type chosen for this technique depends on the desired application of the cell microcapsules. The cells put into the capsules can be from the patient (autologous cells), from another donor (allogeneic cells) or from other species (xenogeneic cells). The use of autologous cells in microencapsulation therapy is limited by the availability of these cells and even though xenogeneic cells are easily accessible, danger of possible transmission of viruses, especially porcine endogenous retrovirus to the patient restricts their clinical application, and after much debate several groups have concluded that studies should involve the use of allogeneic instead of xenogeneic cells. Depending on the application, the cells can be genetically altered to express any required protein. However, enough research has to be carried out to validate the safety and stability of the expressed gene before these types of cells can be used.

This technology has not received approval for clinical trial because of the high immunogenicity of cells loaded in the capsules. They secrete cytokines and produce a severe inflammatory reaction at the implantation site around the capsules, in turn leading to a decrease in viability of the encapsulated cells. One promising approach being studied is the administration of anti-inflammatory drugs to reduce the immune response produced due to administration of the cell loaded microcapsules. Another approach which is now the focus of extensive research is the use of stem cells such as mesenchymal stem cells for long term cell microencapsulation and cell therapy applications in hopes of reducing the immune response in the patient after implantation. Another issue which compromises long term viability of the microencapsulated cells is the use of fast proliferating cell lines which eventually fill up the entire system and lead to decrease in the diffusion efficiency across the semi-permeable membrane of the capsule. A solution to this could be in the use of cell types such as myoblasts which do not proliferate after the microencapsulation procedure.

== Non-therapeutic applications ==
Probiotics are increasingly being used in numerous dairy products such as ice cream, milk powders, yoghurts, frozen dairy desserts and cheese due to their important health benefits. But, low viability of probiotic bacteria in the food still remains a major hurdle. The pH, dissolved oxygen content, titratable acidity, storage temperature, species and strains of associative fermented dairy product organisms and concentration of lactic and acetic acids are some of the factors that greatly affect the probiotic viability in the product. As set by Food and Agriculture Organization (FAO) of the United Nations and the World Health Organization (WHO), the standard in order to be considered a health food with probiotic addition, the product should contain per gram at least 10^{6}-10^{7} cfu of viable probiotic bacteria. It is necessary that the bacterial cells remain stable and healthy in the manufactured product, are sufficiently viable while moving through the upper digestive tract and are able to provide positive effects upon reaching the intestine of the host.

Cell microencapsulation technology has successfully been applied in the food industry for the encapsulation of live probiotic bacteria cells to increase viability of the bacteria during processing of dairy products and for targeted delivery to the gastrointestinal tract.

Apart from dairy products, microencapsulated probiotics have also been used in non-dairy products, such as TheresweetTM which is a sweetener. It can be used as a convenient vehicle for delivery of encapsulated Lactobacillus to the intestine although it is not itself a dairy product.

== Therapeutic applications ==
=== Diabetes ===
The potential of using bioartificial pancreas, for treatment of diabetes mellitus, based on encapsulating islet cells within a semi permeable membrane is extensively being studied by scientists. These devices could eliminate the need for of immunosuppressive drugs in addition to finally solving the problem of shortage of organ donors. The use of microencapsulation would protect the islet cells from immune rejection as well as allow the use of animal cells or genetically modified insulin-producing cells. It is hoped that development of these islet encapsulated microcapsules could prevent the need for the insulin injections needed several times a day by type 1 diabetic patients. The Edmonton protocol involves implantation of human islets extracted from cadaveric donors and has shown improvements towards the treatment of type 1 diabetics who are prone to hypoglycemic unawareness. However, the two major hurdles faced in this technique are the limited availability of donor organs and with the need for immunosuppresents to prevent an immune response in the patient's body.

Several studies have been dedicated towards the development of bioartificial pancreas involving the immobilization of islets of Langerhans inside polymeric capsules. The first attempt towards this aim was demonstrated in 1980 by Lim et al. where xenograft islet cells were encapsulated inside alginate polylysine microcapsules and showed significant in vivo results for several weeks. It is envisaged that the implantation of these encapsulated cells would help to overcome the use of immunosuppressive drugs and also allow the use of xenograft cells thus obviating the problem of donor shortage.

The polymers used for islet microencapsulation are alginate, chitosan, polyethylene glycol (PEG), agarose, sodium cellulose sulfate and water-insoluble polyacrylates with alginate and PEG being commonly used polymers. With successful in vitro studies being performed using this technique, significant work in clinical trials using microencapsulated human islets is being carried out. In 2003, the use of alginate/PLO microcapsules containing islet cells for pilot phase-1 clinical trials was permitted to be carried out at the University of Perugia by the Italian Ministry of Health. In another study, the potential of clinical application of PEGylation and low doses of the immunosuppressant cyclosporine A were evaluated. The trial which began in 2005 by Novocell, now forms the phase I/II of clinical trials involving implantation of islet allografts into the subcutaneous site. However, there have been controversial studies involving human clinical trials where Living Cell technologies Ltd demonstrated the survival of functional xenogeneic cells transplanted without immunosuppressive medication for 9.5 years. However, the trial received harsh criticism from the International Xenotransplantation Association as being risky and premature. However, even though clinical trials are under way, several major issues such as biocompatibility and immunoprotection need to be overcome.

Potential alternatives to encapsulating isolated islets (of either allo- or xenogeneic origin) are also being explored. Using sodium cellulose sulphate technology from Austrianova Singapore an islet cell line was encapsulated and it was demonstrated that the cells remain viable and release insulin in response to glucose. In pre-clinical studies, implanted, encapsulated cells were able to restore blood glucose levels in diabetic rats over a period of 6 months.

=== Cancer ===
The use of cell encapsulated microcapsules towards the treatment of several forms of cancer has shown great potential. One approach undertaken by researchers is through the implantation of microcapsules containing genetically modified cytokine secreting cells. An example of this was demonstrated by Cirone et al. when genetically modified IL-2 cytokine secreting non-autologous mouse myoblasts implanted into mice showed a delay in the tumor growth with an increased rate of survival of the animals. However, the efficiency of this treatment was brief due to an immune response towards the implanted microcapsules. Another approach to cancer suppression is through the use of angiogenesis inhibitors to prevent the release of growth factors which lead to the spread of tumors. The effect of implanting microcapsules loaded with xenogenic cells genetically modified to secrete endostatin, an antiangiogenic drug which causes apoptosis in tumor cells, has been extensively studied. However, this method of local delivery of microcapsules was not feasible in the treatment of patients with many tumors or in metastasis cases and has led to recent studies involving systemic implantation of the capsules.

In 1998, a murine model of pancreatic cancer was used to study the effect of implanting genetically modified cytochrome P450 expressing feline epithelial cells encapsulated in cellulose sulfate polymers for the treatment of solid tumors. The approach demonstrated for the first time the application of enzyme expressing cells to activate chemotherapeutic agents. On the basis of these results, an encapsulated cell therapy product, NovaCaps, was tested in a phase I and II clinical trial for the treatment of pancreatic cancer in patients and has recently been designated by the European medicines agency (EMEA) as an orphan drug in Europe. A further phase I/II clinical trial using the same product confirmed the results of the first trial, demonstrating an approximate doubling of survival time in patients with stage IV pancreatic cancer. In all of these trials using cellulose sulphate, in addition to the clear anti-tumour effects, the capsules were well tolerated and there were no adverse reactions seen such as immune response to the capsules, demonstrating the biocompatible nature of the cellulose sulphate capsules. In one patient the capsules were in place for almost 2 years with no side effects.

These studies show the promising potential application of cell microcapsules towards the treatment of cancers. However, solutions to issues such as immune response leading to inflammation of the surrounding tissue at the site of capsule implantation have to be researched in detail before more clinical trials are possible.

=== Heart Diseases ===
Numerous studies have been dedicated towards the development of effective methods to enable cardiac tissue regeneration in patients after ischemic heart disease. An emerging approach to answer the problems related to ischemic tissue repair is through the use of stem cell-based therapy. However, the actual mechanism due to which this stem cell-based therapy has generative effects on cardiac function is still under investigation. Even though numerous methods have been studied for cell administration, the efficiency of the number of cells retained in the beating heart after implantation is still very low. A promising approach to overcome this problem is through the use of cell microencapsulation therapy which has shown to enable a higher cell retention as compared to the injection of free stem cells into the heart.

Another strategy to improve the impact of cell based encapsulation technique towards cardiac regenerative applications is through the use of genetically modified stem cells capable of secreting angiogenic factors such as vascular endothelial growth factor (VEGF) which stimulate neovascularization and restore perfusion in the damaged ischemic heart. An example of this is shown in the study by Zang et al. where genetically modified xenogeneic CHO cells expressing VEGF were encapsulated in alginate-polylysine-alginate microcapsules and implanted into rat myocardium. It was observed that the encapsulation protected the cells from an immunoresponse for three weeks and also led to an improvement in the cardiac tissue post-infarction due to increased angiogenesis.

=== Monoclonal Antibody Therapy ===
The use of monoclonal antibodies for therapy is now widespread for treatment of cancers and inflammatory diseases. Using cellulose sulphate technology, scientists have successfully encapsulated antibody producing hybridoma cells and demonstrated subsequent release of the therapeutic antibody from the capsules. The capsules containing the hybridoma cells were used in pre-clinical studies to deliver neutralising antibodies to the mouse retrovirus FrCasE, successfully preventing disease.

=== Other conditions ===
Many other medical conditions have been targeted with encapsulation therapies, especially those involving a deficiency in some biologically derived protein. One of the most successful approaches is an external device that acts similarly to a dialysis machine, only with a reservoir of pig hepatocytes surrounding the semipermeable portion of the blood-infused tubing. This apparatus can remove toxins from the blood of patients suffering severe liver failure. Other applications that are still in development include cells that produce ciliary-derived neurotrophic factor for the treatment of ALS and Huntington's disease, glial-derived neurotrophic factor for Parkinson's disease, erythropoietin for anemia, and HGH for dwarfism. In addition, monogenic diseases such as haemophilia, Gaucher's disease and some mucopolysaccharide disorders could also potentially be targeted by encapsulated cells expressing the protein that is otherwise lacking in the patient.
