= Nanoshell =

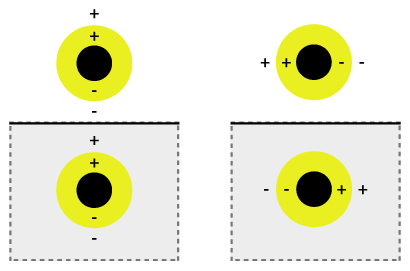
Figure 1. s-polarization and p-polarization

A nanoshell, or rather a nanoshell plasmon, is a type of spherical nanoparticle consisting of a dielectric core which is covered by a thin metallic shell (usually gold). These nanoshells involve a quasiparticle called a plasmon which is a collective excitation or quantum plasma oscillation where the electrons simultaneously oscillate with respect to all the ions.

The simultaneous oscillation can be called plasmon hybridization where the tunability of the oscillation is associated with mixture of the inner and outer shell where they hybridize to give a lower energy or higher energy. This lower energy couples strongly to incident light, whereas the higher energy is an anti-bonding and weakly combines to incident light. The hybridization interaction is stronger for thinner shell layers, hence, the thickness of the shell and overall particle radius determines which wavelength of light it couples with. Nanoshells can be varied across a broad range of the light spectrum that spans the visible and near infrared regions. The interaction of light and nanoparticles affects the placement of charges which affects the coupling strength. Incident light polarized parallel to the substrate gives a s-polarization (Figure 1b), hence the charges are further from the substrate surface which gives a stronger interaction between the shell and core. Otherwise, a p-polarization is formed which gives a more strongly shifted plasmon energy causing a weaker interaction and coupling.

In chemistry, synthetic biology, and materials science, the term "nanoshell" is also used in single-cell nanoencapsulation (SCNE), in which individual living cells are encapsulated within nanometric shells composed of external materials, creating "cell-in-shell" nanobiohybrid structures.

== Discovery ==
The discovery of the nanoshell was made by Professor Naomi J. Halas and her team at Rice University in 2003. When she and her team discovered nanoshells, they weren't initially sure what potential such nanoshells held. "We said, 'Gee, what could it be good for?'" Halas told CNN. After many suggestions, cancer therapy came out of ongoing collaborations with bioengineers looking for different types of biomedical applications. "One of our visions", Halas stated, "no less than single visit diagnosis and treatment of cancer". In 2003 Halas was awarded for Best Discovery of 2003 by Nanotechnology Now.

== Production ==
A state of the art method for synthesizing gold nanoshells is the use of the Microfluidic Composite Foams. This method has the potential to replace the standard lithographic method of synthesizing plasmonic nanoshells. The production process described below was an experiment performed by Suhanya Duraiswamy and Saif A. Khan of the Department of Chemical and Biomolecular Engineering in Singapore. Although this method was an experiment, it represents the future of nanoshells synthesis.

The materials required for the production of the nanoshells are the following; Tetraethyl orthosilicate, ammonium hydroxide, hydroxylamine hydrochloride, 3-aminopropyl tris, hydrogentetrachloroaurate(III) trihydrate, tetrakis(hydroxymethyl) phosphonium chloride, sodium hydroxide, potassium carbonate, ethanol, Ultrapure water and glassware washed in aqua regia and rinsed thoroughly in water.)

The first step in synthesizing nanoshells in this method is by creating the device for the reaction to take place within. Microfluidic device patterns were fabricated onto silicon wafers by standard photolithography using negative photoresist SU-8 2050. Devices were subsequently molded in poly(dimethyl siloxane) (PDMS) using the soft lithography technique.(40) Briefly, PDMS was molded onto the SU-8 masters at 70 °C for 4 h, peeled, cut, and cleaned. Inlet and outlet holes (1/16-in. o.d.) were punched into the device. The microchannels were irreversibly bonded to a glass slide precoated with a thin layer of PDMS after a brief 35 s air plasma treatment. The microchannels have rectangular cross-section and are 300 μm wide, 155 μm deep, and 0.45 m long.

The actual production of the nanoparticles involves pumping "silicone oil, a mixture of gold-seeded silica particles and gold-plating solution and reducing agent solution to the microfluidic device while nitrogen gas was delivered from a cylinder." The plating solution was then left to age, in a controlled environment, for longer than 24 hours. After the aging process, the fluid is collected from the Microfluidic Device and placed in a centrifuge. The resulting liquid has a layer of oil on the surface with a solution below that contains the nanoshells.

The reason this method is revolutionary is that the size and relative thickness of the gold nanoshell can be controlled by changing the amount of time the reaction is allowed to take place as well as the concentration of the plating solution. Thereby allowing researchers to tailor the particles to suit their given needs. Albeit for optics or cancer treatment.

== Cancer treatment ==
Gold-shelled nanoparticles, which are spherical nanoparticles with silica and/or liposome cores and gold shells, are used in cancer therapy and bio-imaging enhancement. Theranostic probes – capable of detection and treatment of cancer in a single treatment – are nanoparticles that have binding sites on their shell that allow them to attach to a desired location (typically cancerous cells) then can be imaged through dual modality imagery (an imaging strategy that uses x-rays and radionuclide imaging) and through near-infrared fluorescence. The reason gold nanoparticles are used is due to their vivid optical properties which are controlled by their size, geometry, and their surface plasmons. Gold nanoparticles (such as AuNPs) have the benefit of being biocompatible and the flexibility to have multiple different molecules, and fundamental materials, attached to their shell (almost anything that can normally be attached to gold can be attached to the gold nano-shell, which can be used in helping identifying and treating cancer). The treatment of cancer is possible only because of the scattering and absorption that occurs for plasmonics. Under scattering, the gold-plated nano-particles become visible to imaging processes that are tuned to the correct wavelength which is dependent upon the size and geometry of the particles. Under absorption, photothermal ablation occurs, which heats the nanoparticles and their immediate surroundings to temperatures capable of killing the cancer cells. This is accomplished with minimal damage to cells in the body due to the utilization of the "water window" (the spectral range between 800 and 1300 nm). As the human body is mostly water, this optimizes the light used versus the effects rendered.

These gold nanoshells are shuttled into tumors by the use of phagocytosis, where phagocytes engulf the nanoshells through the cell membrane to form an internal phagosome, or macrophage. After this it is shuttled into a cell and enzymes are usually used to metabolize it and shuttle it back out of the cell. These nanoshells are not metabolized so for them to be effective they just need to be within the tumor cells and photo-induced cell death (as described above) is used to terminate the tumor cells. This scheme is shown in Figure 2.

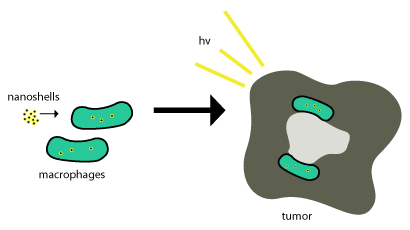
Figure 2. Nanoshells taken into tumors.

Nanoparticle-based therapeutics have been successfully delivered into tumors by exploiting the enhanced permeability and retention effect, a property that permits nanoscale structures to be taken up passively into tumors without the assistance of antibodies.[4] Delivery of nanoshells into the important regions of tumors can be very difficult. This is where most nanoshells try to exploit the tumor's natural recruitment of monocytes for delivery as seen in the above figure. This delivery system is called a "Trojan Horse".

This process works so well since tumors are about ¾ macrophages and once monocytes are brought into the tumor, it differentiates into macrophages which would also be need to maintain the cargo nanoparticles. Once the nanoshells are at the necrotic center, near-infrared illumination is used to destroy the tumor associated macrophages.

Additionally, these nanoparticles can be made to release antisense DNA oligonucleotides when under photo-activation. These oligonucleotides are used in conjunction with the photo-thermal ablation treatments to perform gene-therapy. This is accomplished because nanoparticle complexes are delivered inside of cells then undergo light induced release of DNA from their surface. This will allow for the internal manipulation of a cell and provide a means for monitoring a group cells return to equilibrium.

Another example of nanoshell plasmonics in cancer treatment involves placing drugs inside of the nanoparticle and using it as a vehicle to deliver toxic drugs to cancerous sites only. This is accomplished by coating the outside of a nanoparticle with iron oxide (allowing for easy tracking with an MRI machine), then once the area of the tumor is coated with the drug-filled nanoparticles, the nanoparticles can be activated using resonant light waves to release the drug.
