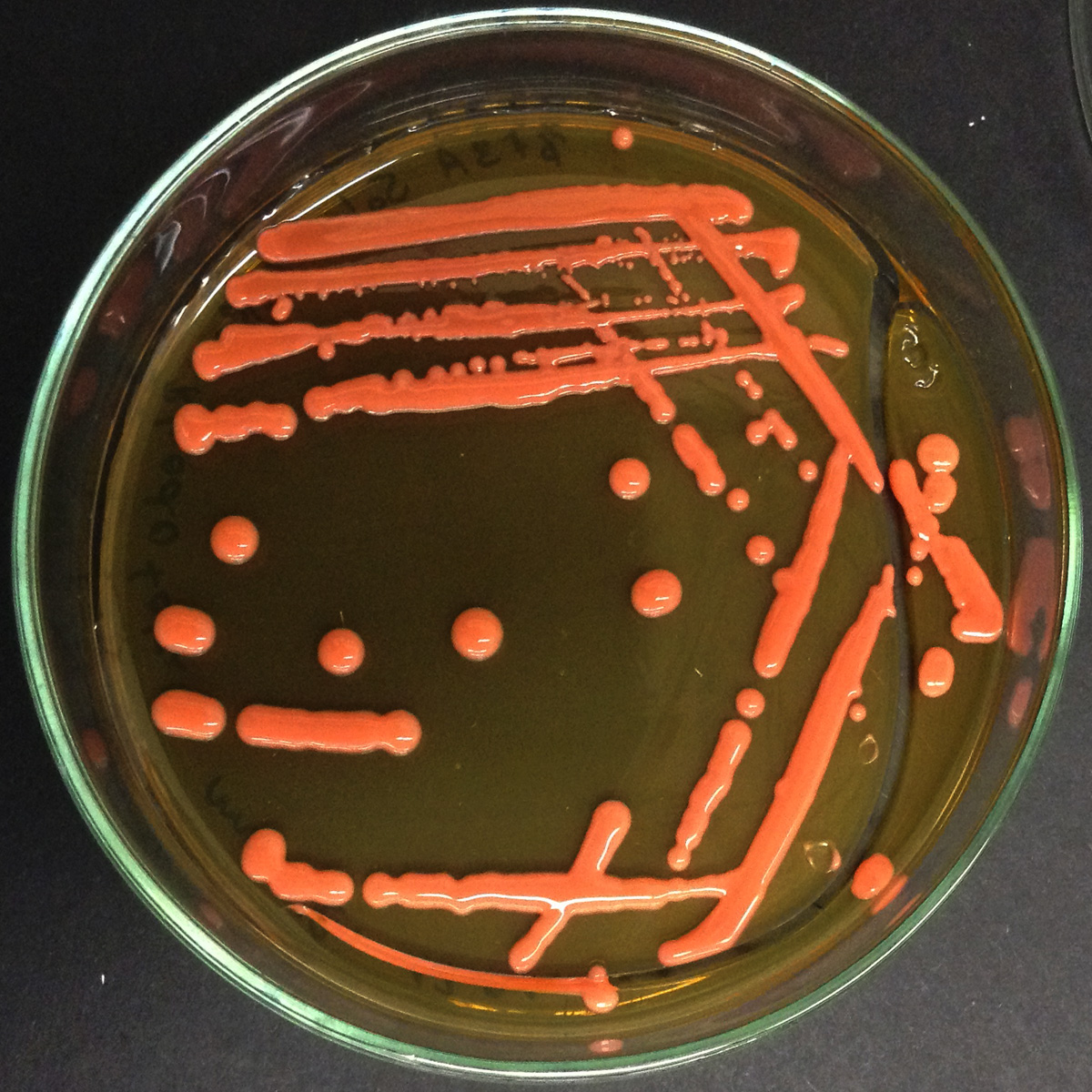
- Rhodotorula mucilaginosa colonies on Sabouraud agar (with 2 % glucose)

Scientific classification
- Kingdom: Fungi
- Division: Basidiomycota
- Class: Microbotryomycetes
- Order: Sporidiobolales
- Family: Sporidiobolaceae
- Genus: Rhodotorula; F.C. Harrison (1927)

Type species
- Rhodotorula glutinis (Fresen.) F.C. Harrison (1928)

Synonyms
- Chromotorula F.C. Harrison (1927); Rhodosporidium I. Banno (1967)

= Rhodotorula =

Genus of fungi

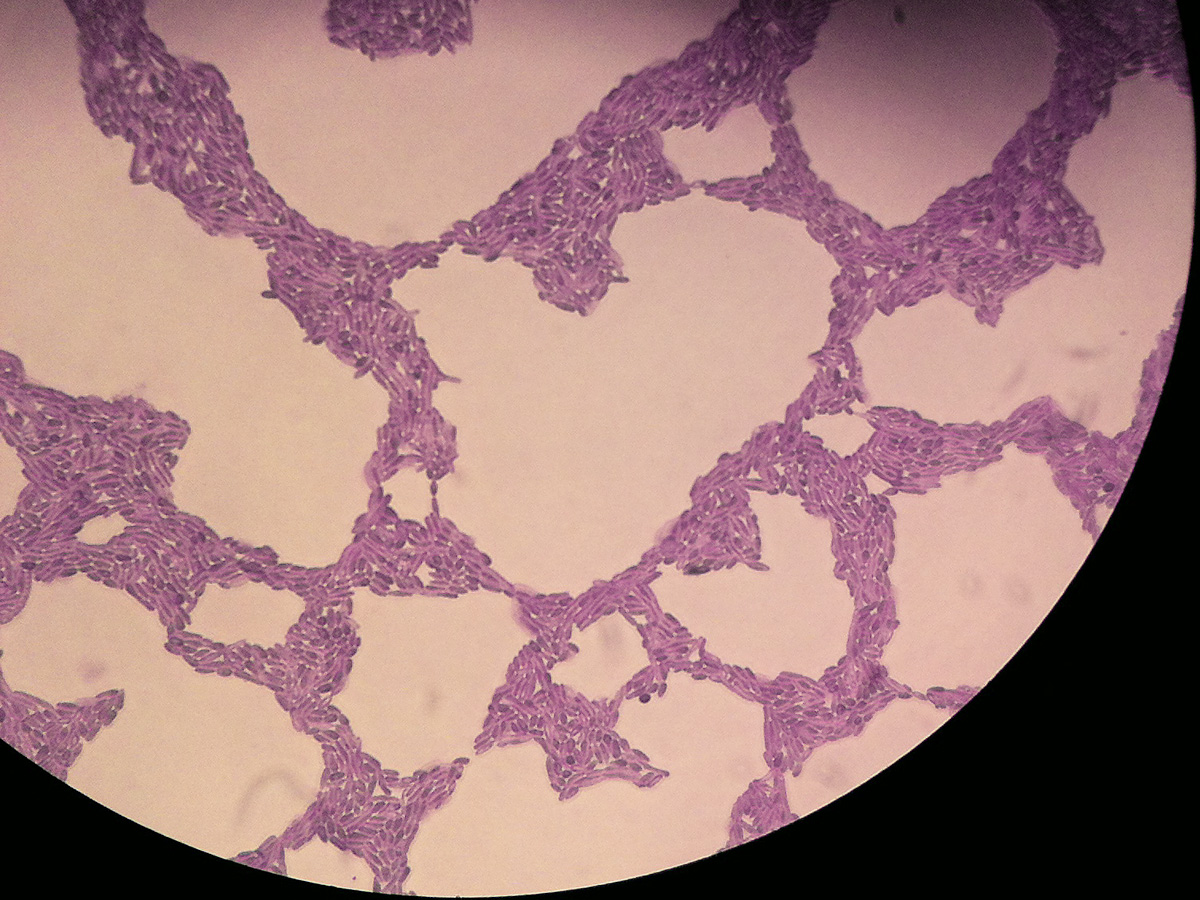
.Rhodotorula mucilaginosa cells, Methylene blue stain, magnification 400x

Rhodotorula is a genus of fungi in the class Microbotryomycetes. Most species are known in their yeast states which produce orange to red colonies when grown on Sabouraud's dextrose agar (SDA). The colour is the result of carotenoid pigments that the yeast creates to block out certain wavelengths of light (620–750 nm) that would otherwise be damaging to the cell. Hyphal states, formerly placed in the genus Rhodosporidium, give rise to teliospores from which laterally septate basidia emerge, producing sessile basidiospores. Species occur worldwide and can be isolated from air, water, soil, and other substrates.

== Taxonomy ==
The genus Rhodotorula was first created in 1927 by Canadian microbiologist Francis C. Harrison to accommodate red-pigmented yeasts (Ancient Greek ῥόδον (rhodon) means rose-coloured). Subsequent authors added over 150 additional species to the genus. Molecular research, based on cladistic analysis of DNA sequences, has, however, shown that Rhodotorula sensu lato is polyphyletic (a mix of unrelated species). Consequently, the majority of species formerly placed in Rhodotorula have been transferred to genera in other orders including the Agaricostilbales, Cystobasidiales, Cystofilobasidiales, Filobasidiales, Kriegeriales, Microstromatales, Tremellales, Trichosporonales, and Ustilaginales. Only a small, monophyletic group of 20 or so species related to the type, Rhodotorula glutinis, remain in Rhodotorula sensu stricto.

In 1967 Japanese mycologist Isao Banno introduced the genus Rhodosporidium for the sexual state of Rhodotorula, producing hyphae and basidiospores. Following changes to the International Code of Nomenclature for algae, fungi, and plants, the practice of giving different names to teleomorph and anamorph forms of the same fungus was discontinued, meaning that Rhodosporidium became a synonym of the earlier name Rhodotorula.

== Habitat ==
Rhodotorula species are common environmental inhabitants. They can be cultured from soil, water, milk, fruit juice, and air samples. They are able to scavenge nitrogenous compounds from their environment remarkably well, growing even in air that has been carefully cleaned of any fixed nitrogen contaminants. In such conditions, the nitrogen content of the dry weight of the Rhodotorula species can drop as low as 1%, compared to around 14% for most bacteria growing in normal conditions.

== Pathology ==
Only Rhodotorula mucilaginosa and R. glutinis have been known to cause disease in humans. The first reported case of Rhodotorula infection in humans was in 1960. There were no reported cases of Rhodotorula infections between 1970 and 1985. There were however forty-three reported cases of Rhodotorula bloodstream infections (BSIs) between 1960 and 2000. Rhodotorula species are most commonly found in patients who are immunosuppressed and/or are using foreign-body technology such as central venous catheters. Rhodotorula infection is commonly treated by removing the catheter and the use of anti-fungals. Rhodotorula species are susceptible to amphotericin B and flucytosine.

Rhodotorula species can also cause infections in animals. There have been reports of skin infections in chickens and sea animals and lung infections and otitis in sheep and cattle.

== Potential in bioremediation ==
One area in which Rhodotorula species may become of importance is in bioremediation, especially of contaminated water sites. As with bacteria, fungi can naturally develop modified metabolism to deal with environmental contaminants, and could then be used in bioremediation. One main target is often polycyclic aromatic hydrocarbons (PAHs) since they often persist in the environment and have high levels of toxicity. Through sediment analysis and testing of contaminated waters Rhodotorula species were found to be common in contaminated sites. It was noted in samples taken from contaminated waters that Rhodotorula species had the ability to degrade petroleum compounds. These studies as well as others suggest that Rhodotorula species may be good candidates for bioremediation of polluted waters for PAHs. In more directed studies a number of species of Rhodotorula were found to be able to degrade a number of specific contaminants. For example, R. glutinis and R. rubra (= R. mucilaginosa) have both been found to have a high ability to degrade phenanthrene. In a mixed fungal community Rhodotorula species contributed to effective degradation of low molecular weight PAHs, and although bacterial communities alone were not able to, the fungal communities also degraded high molecular weight PAHs (more than 3 benzene rings) such as chrysene and benzo(a)pyrene. A strain of R. taiwanensis was shown to grow at constant gamma radiation 66 Gy/h at pH 2.3 and in the presence of high concentrations of mercury and chromium compounds, and forming biofilms under high-level chronic radiation and low pH, making it a promising candidate for bioremediation of acidic radioactive waste sites.

== Species ==
- Rhodotorula alborubescens
- Rhodotorula araucariae
- Rhodotorula babjevae
- Rhodotorula dairenensis
- Rhodotorula diobovata
- Rhodotorula evergladiensis
- Rhodotorula glutinis
- Rhodotorula graminis
- Rhodotorula incarnata
- Rhodotorula kratochvilovae
- Rhodotorula mackellariae
- Rhodotorula mucilaginosa
- Rhodotorula ngohengohe
- Rhodotorula pacifica
- Rhodotorula paludigena
- Rhodotorula sampaioana
- Rhodotorula sphaerocarpa
- Rhodotorula taiwanensis
- Rhodotorula toruloides
- Rhodotorula tokyoensis
- Rhodotorula yunnanensis
