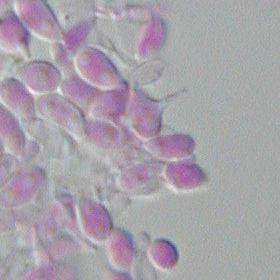

Scientific classification
- Domain: Eukaryota
- Kingdom: Fungi
- Division: Basidiomycota
- Class: Microbotryomycetes
- Order: Sporidiobolales
- Family: Sporidiobolaceae
- Genus: Sporobolomyces
- Species: S. salmonicolor

Binomial name
- Sporobolomyces salmonicolor B. Fisch. & Brebeck ex Kluyver & C.B. Niel (1924)

Synonyms
- Blastoderma salmonicolor B. Fisch. & Brebeck (1894); Prosporobolomyces salmonicolor (B.Fisch. & Brebeck) E.K.Novák & Zsolt (1961); Rhodomyces kochii Wettst. (1885); Monilia kochii (Wettst.) Sacc. (1892); Candida kochii (Wettst.) Basgal (1931); Zymonema kochii (Wettst.) Mello (1918); Sporidiobolus salmonicolor Fell & Tallman (1981); Sporobolomyces salmoneus Derx (1924)

= Sporobolomyces salmonicolor =

Species of fungus

Sporobolomyces salmonicolor is a species of fungus in the subdivision Pucciniomycotina. It occurs in both a yeast state and a hyphal state, the latter formerly known as Sporidiobolus salmonicolor. It is generally considered a Biosafety Risk Group 1 fungus; however isolates of S. salmonicolor have been recovered from cerebrospinal fluid, infected skin, a nasal polyp, lymphadenitis and a case of endophthalmitis. It has also been reported in AIDS-related infections. The fungus exists predominantly in the anamorphic (asexual) state as a unicellular, haploid yeast yet this species can sometimes produce a teleomorphic (sexual) state when conjugation of compatible yeast cells occurs. The asexual form consists of a characteristic, pink, ballistosporic yeast. Ballistoconidia are borne from slender extensions of the cell known as sterigmata and are forcibly ejected into the air upon maturity. Levels of airborne yeast cells peak during the night and are abundant in areas of decaying leaves and grains. Three varieties of Sporobolomyces salmonicolor have been described; S. salmonicolor var. albus, S. salmonicolor var. fischerii, and S. salmonicolor var. salmoneus.

== Taxonomy ==
In 1924, Kluyver and van Niel coined the genus Sporobolomyces and classified it under the Basidiomycota. They recognized that the yeast phase produced by Sporobolomyces exhibited the same forcible discharge mechanism as the basidiospores of the Basidiomycota. They therefore hypothesized that the asexual ballistoconidia of Sporobolomyces are homologues with the basidiospores of the Basidiomycota. Their hypothesis however was questioned by many who did not consider the asexual nature of the ballistoconidia as a basidiomycetous trait. Its classification as a basidiomycetous yeast was further demonstrated by Nyland (1949) with the discovery of its teleomorph, placed in the genus Sporidiobolus. The teleomorph presented basidiomycetous traits such as the presence of dikaryotic hyphae with clamp connections and the formation of resting spores known as teliospores. In the past, Sporobolomyces salmonicolor was thought to be conspecific with Sporobolomyces johnsonii; however it is now well established that they are distinct taxa. Sporobolomyces salmonicolor is distinguished from S. johnsonii by the absence in the former of assimilation of maltose, methyl-a-D-glucoside, cellobiose or salicin.

== Morphology ==
Sporobolomyces salmonicolor produces visible, liposoluble carotenoid pigments, resulting in salmon-pink colonies. The colony surface is smooth and has a pasty texture. There is considerable cell and colony morphology when S. salmonicolor is grown in culture. The budding yeast-like cells produced during the asexual stage are ellipsoidal to subcylindrical and 8–25 × 2–5.5 μm. They can occur singly or in pairs. The ballistoconidia are kidney-shaped and can range in size from 6–18 × 2.5–7.0 μm. The characteristic ballistoconidia are borne by extension of the sterigmata which can reach up to 50 μm in length. Both pseudohyphae and true hyphae may also be present.

In its sexual state, Sporobolomyces salmonicolor produces dikaryotic hyphae with clamp connections. At the terminal end of the hyphae, thick-walled teliospores are produced. Teliospores are 9–15 μm in diameter, brown, spherical, and contain lipid-rich globules. Upon germination of the teliospore, basidia with basidiospores are produced. Basidia are transversely septate, two-celled and 4–6 x 20–25 μm in size. Each basidium will generally produce two large basidiospores that are 5–6 × 7–10 μm in size. Prior to the production of the basidium, endospores have also been known to form in the interior of teliospores. This phenomenon is associated with the production of meiospores within the teliospore cytoplasm, ultimately released by rupture of the teliospore wall.

== Life cycle ==
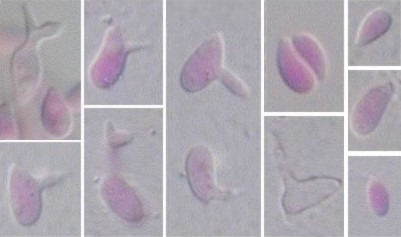
Yeast phase of Sporobolomyces salmonicolor showing characteristic "arthritic-finger"-shaped sterigmata, stained with lactofuchsin.

In 1969, Van der Walt and Pitout elucidated the life cycle of S. salmonicolor. They studied a colony of S. salmonicolor grown from a single cell in culture. After several generations, they observed a 2:1 ratio of diploid and haploid cells, respectively. The diploid cells were recovered from thick-walled resting spores known as teliospores. Meiosis was occurring within the teliospore, followed by germination of the teliospore and beginning of the haploid yeast state.

Sporobolomyces salmonicolor is a heterothallic species; two mating types are known. Induction of the sexual stage begins with anastomosis of compatible yeast cells to form dikaryotic hyphae with clamp connections. Hyphae have "simple" septal pores that allow continuity of the cytoplasm between cells. At the terminal end of the hypha, thick-walled, resting spores called teliospores form. These germinate to form a transversely-septate basidium that bears two large basidiospores.

== Physiology ==
The optimum temperature for growth of Sporobolomyces salmonicolor is between 25–35 °C (77–95 °F), being the highest tolerable temperature. Growth does not occur at 37 °C (99 °F). This species does not undergo fermentation. Additionally, Sporobolomyces salmonicolor shows positive urease activity and a positive staining response when stained with diazonium blue B. Diazonium blue B is a technique used to classify asexual yeasts as members of the Zygomycota, Basidiomycota or Ascomycota. The major ubiquinone present is Q-10. The cell wall of S. salmonicolor contains fucose, mannose, glucose and galactose, however xylose is absent. Colonies grow in the presence of glucose, sucrose, maltose, cellobiose, α,α-trehalose, melezitose, D-arabinose, ethanol, glycerol, D-mannitol, D-glucitol, D-gluconate, succinate, nitrate and urease. This species does not assimilate myo-inositol or D-glucuronate, and do not form extracellular starch-like compounds.

== Distribution and ecology ==
Sporobolomyces salmonicolor has a broad geographical distribution. It has been isolated from many areas across the world including Europe, North and South America, Asia, Africa and Antarctica where it is known from a broad spectrum of substrates. It is principally characterized as a phyllosphere fungus and is commonly found in areas of decaying organic material such as leaves and grains as well as ripening grapes. Isolates of this species however have been recovered from freshwater, marine water and clinical specimens. It has also been isolated from agricultural areas and indoor built environments. In agricultural environments, Sporobolomyces salmonicolor can pose a respiratory hazard for agricultural workers. Agricultural workers are subject to increased exposure when they partake in activities involving the handling of grains. Sporobolomyces salmonicolor has additionally been isolated from straw in hay barns or hay lofts. Workers in these settings should consider the proper use of masks to avoid infection. If individuals show atopic symptoms, a change in occupation might be considered. In indoor environments, S. salmonicolor has been associated with severe water and mould damage. Flooded basements and utility rooms are places where S. salmonicolor may be recovered. This fungus will also commonly associate with standing water films, although not very much has been documented on this. It can form a pink water film around stagnant toilet water. The most efficient way to avoid exposure in the home is to eliminate moisture sources and keep bathrooms clean, dry and ventilated.

== Pathogenicity ==
Sporobolomyces salmonicolor is generally interpreted to be a Biosafety Risk Group 1 fungus. It is considered an opportunistic fungal pathogen of immunocompromised individuals and has been reported in AIDS-related infections. Sporobolomyces salmonicolor has been associated with nasal polyps, lymphadenitis, bone marrow involvement in AIDS patients, infected skin, pseudomeningitis and a case of endophthalmitis. S. salmonicolor is also considered a type 1 allergen and has been known to cause asthma, nosocomial allergic alveolitis, and rhinitis.

A 31-year-old woman went to her physician because of decreased vision in her left eye. The left eye showed fibrinous exudates, posterior synechiae and vitritis. After a vitreous sample was sent to the lab for identification, the yeast was identified as Sporobolomyces salmonicolor. The recommended treatment was voriconazole 200 mg, twice a day for two months. Improvement in the left eye was seen within a week. Exposure to mould and yeast within a military hospital in Finland lead to an outbreak of asthma, alveolitis and rhinitis. The building was known to have severe water and mould damage. After performing inhalation provocation tests, four cases of asthma caused by Sporobolomyces salmonicolor were reported. An additional seven workers were diagnosed with rhinitis. All seven individuals with rhinitis acted positively in nasal S. salmonicolor provocation tests. Sporobolomyces salmonicolor was recovered from the cerebrospinal fluid (CSF) of three patients in a hospital, one of whom was a kidney transplant recipient. Heavy growth of S. salmonicolor was recovered from utility rooms on the floors of each patient, and from the hospital rooms of two patients. It was suggested that this particular case was most likely caused by contamination. During the collection process, S. salmonicolor was most likely introduced into the CSF as a contaminant.

== Treatment ==
Clinical infections due to Sporobolomyces salmonicolor are rare and there are currently no standard therapies for infection. Treatment with amphotericin B alone, and amphotericin B followed by either ketoconazole or fluconazole have been successful. In one case of endophthalmitis (mentioned in case report below), treatment with voriconazole was likewise successful. A small number of isolates however demonstrate resistance to fluconazole and micafungin.

== Popular culture ==
The genus Sporobolomyces was the unexpected subject of a poem, The Sporobolomycetologist, with an accompanying musical score, written by the eccentric Canadian mycologist Arthur Henry Reginald Buller.
