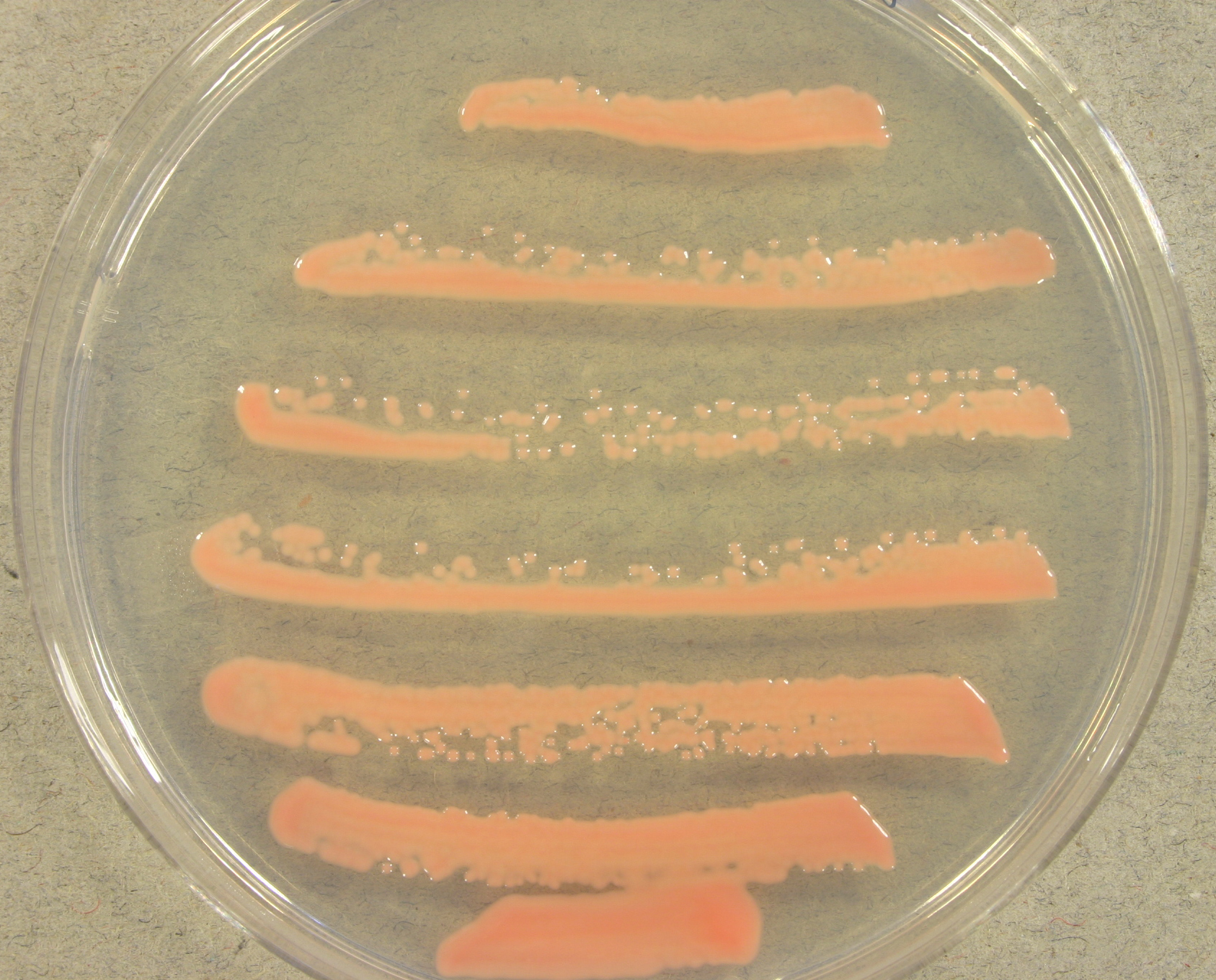

Scientific classification
- Kingdom: Fungi
- Division: Basidiomycota
- Class: Microbotryomycetes
- Order: Sporidiobolales
- Family: Sporidiobolaceae
- Genus: Rhodotorula
- Species: R. glutinis

Binomial name
- Rhodotorula glutinis (Fresen.) F.C. Harrison (1928)

Synonyms
- Cryptococcus glutinis Fresen. (1852); Saccharomyces glutinis (Fresen.) Cohn (1872); Torula glutinis (Fresen.) Pringsh. & Bilewsky (1911); Rhodotorula terrea Sugiy. & Goto (1969)

= Rhodotorula glutinis =

Species of fungus

Rhodotorula glutinis is the type species of the genus Rhodotorula, a basidiomycetous genus of pink yeasts which contains 370 species. Heterogeneity of the genus has made its classification difficult with five varieties having been recognized; however, as of 2011, all are considered to represent a single taxon. The fungus is a common colonist of animals, foods and environmental materials. It can cause opportunistic infections, notably blood infection in the setting of significant underlying disease. It has been used industrially in the production of carotenoid pigments and as a biocontrol agent for post-harvest spoilage diseases of fruits.

== Growth and morphology ==
Rhodotorula glutinis is an aerobic yeast characterized by pink, smooth colonies with a moist appearance. Reproduction is typically by multipolar budding although pseudohyphae are occasionally produced. Sexual reproduction is by basidiospores arising from a teliospore developed from a mycelial clamp connection. A distinguishing feature of the species and its close relatives are the intense yellow and red pigments produced during growth on most substrates.

It normally grows at 37 °C at a rapid rate, and requires a minimum water activity of 0.92, pH of 2.2, and organic acids or HCl. Growth is inhibited by 100 mg/kg or less of benzoic acid or sorbic acid and a pH of 4 or above. The fungus is unable to grow on malt acetic agar or MY50G medium. At maturity, the cells reach a diameter of 3-5 μm and are round, oval, or elongate in shape, aggregating as mucoid colonies. Carbohydrates in the cell include glucose, fucose, galactose, and mannose. R. glutinis is heat resistant, an uncommon feature in yeasts without spores, tolerating 62.5 °C (144.5 °F) for 10 minutes. R. glutinis is closely related to Rhodotorula mucilaginosa, differing only in their ability to use nitrate as a nitrogen source, which R. glutinis cannot assimilate. Both species are incapable of fermentation and assimilation of Myo-Inositol and D-glucoronate.

Standard microbiological methods of identification have misidentified Candida auris as Rhodotorula glutinis, until sequence analysis correctly identified C. auris as such.

The genome of R. glutinis is CG-rich, containing up to 67% GC by base composition.

== Habitat and ecology ==
Rhodotorula glutinis is distributed widely, most often found in soil, air and throughout the phyllosphere. Accordingly, it is not uncommon to recover it in cultures of cereals, flour, malting barley, dough, citrus products, olives and soaking soybeans. It is frequently isolated from foods. Due to its rapid growth at refrigerator temperatures, it is encountered sometimes as a spoilage agent in dairy products such as yogurts, cheeses, butter, and fresh and processed meats, vegetables and seafoods. It has also been reported from blotched frozen peas stored at 0 °C (32 °F) for 8 weeks with yeast burden increasing significantly after 24 weeks at −18 °C (0 °F), suggesting an ability to proliferate at temperatures below freezing. The fungus is a commensal of mammals including humans, occurring commonly on skin and is found in stool.

== Industrial applications ==
There has been increasing interest and development in the biotechnological applications of R. glutinis over recent years. The fungus produces carotenoids, such as beta-Carotene and torularhodin, which animals cannot synthesize on their own. In the yeast, carotenoids act as a protective agent against visible light and harmful metabolic oxygen species. Carotenoids are valuable in wastewater treatment, production of enzymes, pharmaceuticals, and even tumor inhibition. Because the fungus exhibits rapid growth and is ostensibly single-celled, it is a potential candidate for large-scale manufacturing. Given a suitable culture medium, an optimal yield of carotenoid could in theory be attained from cheap substrates such as beet molasses, peat extract, and grape must. An R. glutinis mutant (NCIM 3253) was shown to produce 76-fold more b-carotene than their wild type relatives, suggesting that these microorganisms may have a role in cost-effective, high yield manufacture of carotenoids. Recent studies have also shown that 16 strains of R. glutinis possess antibacterial and antioxidant properties, although it is unclear if the fungus could be used to manufacture these materials on a commercially viable scale.

R. glutinis has been investigated as a biocontrol agent of post-harvest disease of fruits. Pretreatment of apples and oranges with R. glutinis effectively reduced or prevented blue mold (Penicillium expansum) and grey mold (Botrytis cinerea), lengthening the shelf life of these fruits without reducing fruit quality. The yeast is thought to inhibit post-spoilage rot by competing with spoilage agents for space and nutrients, i.e. competitive inhibition. An inoculum of R. glutinis remains viable in storage at 20 °C (68 °F) for 5 days, supporting its potential as a stable biocontrol agent.

== Pathogenicity ==
Rhodotorula glutinis is the second most common disease-causing species of Rhodotorula following R. mucilaginosa. Infections have been observed worldwide, though nearly half of all reported infections have originated in the Asia-Pacific region.

It was not until 1985, that species of Rhodotorula had been first reported in human colonization and infection. Its occasional recovery from stool has led to the suggestion that it exists as a periodic, clinically insignificant colonist of the distal gut. Rhodotorula species are the most commonly isolated yeasts found on hands of hospital workers, suggesting a potential reservoir for the agent.

This observation, combined with its high tolerance for extreme conditions may partially explain its rare appearance as an opportunistic agent of blood infection in seriously ill people. The majority of cases are systemic in nature, often causing fungemia in patients with underlying disease or immunosuppression, such as cancer or leukemia, and transplant and AIDS patients most likely to develop systemic infection. The incidence correlates with the rising use of intensive medical therapies and central venous catheters. Infection may be linked to venous catheter contamination due to the strong affinity of this species for plastic. Although reports of systemic infections predominate, localized infection has been reported as well, including meningitis and peritonitis absent overt immunosuppression or CVC.

Rhodotorula glutinis is highly drug resistant to most antifungal agents, but successful treatment has been achieved with amphotericin B.
