= Auxenochlorella pyrenoidosa =

Scientific classification
- Clade: Viridiplantae
- Division: Chlorophyta
- Class: Trebouxiophyceae
- Order: Chlorellales
- Family: Chlorellaceae
- Genus: Auxenochlorella
- Species: A. pyrenoidosa

Binomial name
- Auxenochlorella pyrenoidosa Molinari & Calvo-Pérez, 2015

Synonyms
- Chlorella pyrenoidosa H.Chick, 1903

Species of green alga

Auxenochlorella pyrenoidosa, formerly Chlorella pyrenoidosa, is a species of the freshwater green alga in the Division Chlorophyta. It occurs worldwide. The species name pyrenoidosa refers to the presence of a prominent pyrenoid within the Chlorella chloroplast.

== Uses ==
Auxenochlorella pyrenoidosa has been studied medicinally as a chelatory agent, for example to extract dioxins from the body. Possible medicinal uses include fibromyalgia, hypertension, and ulcerative colitis. The pyrenoidosa species have been used in traditional Chinese medicine.

Boraas reported a mutation in a population of Chlorella pyrenoidosa kept in his lab as a food stock for a population of flagellates. Due to a malfunction of his equipment some of the flagellates got in the Chlorella's tank. This caused a mutation from unicellular to multicellular.

For early work in this area, a science project by David and John Watkins at Fairborn High School tested use of Auxenochlorella pyrenoidosa to support generation of oxygen for use in space missions. This was reported in the January 31, 1959 edition of the Fairborn Daily Herald and the project went on to win a top ranking at the Ohio State science fair in Columbus Ohio that year. The brothers were 14 and 13 years old at the time and based part of their work on information from the Kettering Foundation.

This algae was used in a 1961 study by Boeing to explore the feasibility of using algae to provide oxygen on space missions.
