= ISO 10993 =

Standards for evaluating biocompatibility of medical devices

The ISO 10993 set entails a series of standards for evaluating the biocompatibility of medical devices to manage biological risk. These documents were preceded by the Tripartite agreement and is a part of the international harmonisation of the safe use evaluation of medical devices. For the purpose of the ISO 10993 family of standards, biocompatibility is defined as the "ability of a medical device or material to perform with an appropriate host response in a specific application".

== ISO 10993-1 & endpoints for consideration ==
Part 1 of the Standard provides general information about the biocompatibility evaluation process. The current version was published in 2018, replacing the previous version published in 2009. A new version is expected to be published by the end of 2025.

Table A.1 is used to classify medical devices according to the nature (e.g. implant device) and duration (e.g. long term contact of more than 30 days) of their interaction with the human body. This is a core aspect of the evaluation process that will determine which endpoints should be evaluated. However, the relevant endpoints should be decided as part of a risk-evaluation process that goes beyond the categorization of the medical device. Even if an endpoint is excluded by the categorization, it may be necessary if the risk-evaluation recommends it.

The Food and Drug Administration (FDA) published a guidance document to support the evaluation process, clarifying their interpretation of some key aspects of the normative.

Medical device categorization by			Biological Effect												
Nature of Body Contact		Contact Duration A-limited (≤24 h) B-prolonged (>24 h to 30 d) C-permanent (> 30 d)	Cytotoxicity	Sensitization	Irritation or Intracutaneous Reactivity	Acute Systemic Toxicity	Material-Mediated Pyrogenicity	Subacute/Subchronic Toxicity	Genotoxicity	Implantation	Hemocompatibility	Chronic Toxicity	Carcinogenicity	Reproductive/Developmental Toxicity	Degradation
Category	Contact	Contact Duration A-limited (≤24 h) B-prolonged (>24 h to 30 d) C-permanent (> 30 d)	Cytotoxicity	Sensitization	Irritation or Intracutaneous Reactivity	Acute Systemic Toxicity	Material-Mediated Pyrogenicity	Subacute/Subchronic Toxicity	Genotoxicity	Implantation	Hemocompatibility	Chronic Toxicity	Carcinogenicity	Reproductive/Developmental Toxicity	Degradation
Surface device	Intact skin	A	X	X	X										
Surface device	Intact skin	B	X	X	X										
Surface device	Intact skin	C	X	X	X										
Surface device	Mucosal membrane	A	X	X	X										
Surface device	Mucosal membrane	B	X	X	X	O	O	O		O					
Surface device	Mucosal membrane	C	X	X	X	O	O	X	X	O		O			
Surface device	Breached or compromised surface	A	X	X	X	O	O								
Surface device	Breached or compromised surface	B	X	X	X	O	O	O		O					
Surface device	Breached or compromised surface	C	X	X	X	O	O	X	X	O		O	O		
External communicating device	Blood path, indirect	A	X	X	X	X	O					X			
External communicating device	Blood path, indirect	B	X	X	X	X	O	O				X			
External communicating device	Blood path, indirect	C	X	X	O	X	O	X	X	O	X	O	O		
External communicating device	Tissue/bone/dentin	A	X	X	X	O	O								
External communicating device	Tissue/bone/dentin	B	X	X	X	X	O	X	X	X					
External communicating device	Tissue/bone/dentin	C	X	X	X	X	O	X	X	X		O	O		
External communicating device	Circulating blood	A	X	X	X	X	O		O		X				
External communicating device	Circulating blood	B	X	X	X	X	O	X	X	X	X				
External communicating device	Circulating blood	C	X	X	X	X	O	X	X	X	X	O	O		
Implant device	Tissue/bone	A	X	X	X	O	O								
Implant device	Tissue/bone	B	X	X	X	X	O	X	X	X					
Implant device	Tissue/bone	C	X	X	X	X	O	X	X	X		O	O		
Implant device	Blood	A	X	X	X	X	O		O	X	X				
Implant device	Blood	B	X	X	X	X	O	X	X	X	X				
Implant device	Blood	C	X	X	X	X	O	X	X	X	X	O	O		
X = ISO 10993-1:2009 recommended endpoints for consideration
O = Additional FDA recommended endpoints for consideration

== List of the standards in the 10993 series ==
With the exception of Part 1, each part focuses on a specific aspect of the biocompatibility evaluation process. The title indicates the publication year of the latest edition. Withdrawn parts are no longer relevant and will not be maintained or updated.

ISO 10993-1: 2025. Requirements and general principles for the evaluation of biological safety within a risk management process

ISO 10993-2: 2022. Animal welfare requirements

ISO 10993-3: 2014. Tests for genotoxicity, carcinogenicity and reproductive toxicity

ISO 10993-4: 2017. Selection of tests for interactions with blood

ISO 10993-5: 2009. Tests for in vitro cytotoxicity.

ISO 10993-6: 2016. Tests for local effects after implantation

ISO 10993-7: 2008. Ethylene oxide sterilization residuals

ISO 10993-8: 2000. Selection of reference materials (withdrawn)

ISO 10993-9: 2019. Framework for identification and quantification of potential degradation products

ISO 10993-10: 2021. Tests for skin sensitization

ISO 10993-11: 2017. Tests for systemic toxicity

ISO 10993-12: 2021. Sample preparation and reference materials

ISO 10993-13: 2010. Identification and quantification of degradation products from polymeric medical devices

ISO 10993-14: 2001. Identification and quantification of degradation products from ceramics

ISO 10993-15: 2019. Identification and quantification of degradation products from metals and alloys

ISO 10993-16: 2017. Toxicokinetic study design for degradation products and leachables

ISO 10993-17: 2023. Toxicological risk assessment of medical device constituents

ISO 10993-18: 2020. Chemical characterization of medical device materials within a risk management process

ISO 10993-19: 2020. Physico-chemical, morphological and topographical characterization of materials

ISO 10993-20: 2006. Principles and methods for immunotoxicology testing of medical devices

ISO 10993-22: 2017. Guidance on nanomaterials

ISO 10993-23: 2021. Tests for irritation

ISO 10993-33: 2015. Guidance on tests to evaluate genotoxicity — Supplement to ISO 10993-3

== See also ==
- List of ISO standards
- ISO Standards catalogue: 11.100.20 - Biological evaluation of medical devices
