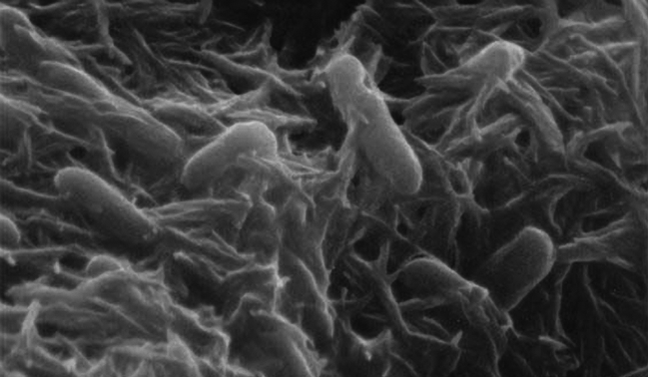

Scientific classification
- Domain: Bacteria
- Kingdom: Pseudomonadati
- Phylum: Pseudomonadota
- Class: Gammaproteobacteria
- Order: Alteromonadales
- Family: Shewanellaceae
- Genus: Shewanella
- Species: S. oneidensis

Binomial name
- Shewanella oneidensis Venkateswaran et al. 1999

= Shewanella oneidensis =

Species of facultative anaerobic bacterium

Shewanella oneidensis is a bacterium notable for its ability to reduce metal ions and live in environments with or without oxygen. This proteobacterium was first isolated from Lake Oneida, NY in 1988, hence its name.

Shewanella oneidensis is a facultative bacterium, capable of surviving and proliferating in both aerobic and anaerobic conditions. The special interest in S. oneidensis MR-1 revolves around its behavior in an anaerobic environment contaminated by heavy metals such as iron, lead and uranium. Experiments suggest it may reduce ionic mercury to elemental mercury and ionic silver to elemental silver. Cellular respiration for these bacteria is not restricted to heavy metals though; the bacteria can also target sulfates, nitrates and chromates when grown anaerobically.

== Name ==
This species is referred to as S. oneidensis MR-1, indicating its special feature, "manganese reducing". It is a common misconception to think that MR-1 refers to "metal-reducing" rather than the original intended "manganese-reducing," as observed by Kenneth H. Nealson, who first isolated the organism. Although it was originally known as "manganese-reducing", the additional abbreviation "metal-reducing" is also valid, as S. oneidensis MR-1 reduces metals other than manganese.

== Qualities ==
=== Metal reduction ===
Shewanella oneidensis MR-1 belongs to a class of bacteria known as "Dissimilatory Metal-Reducing Bacteria (DMRB)" because of their ability to couple metal reduction with their metabolism. The means of reducing the metals is a matter of particular controversy, as research using scanning electron microscopy and transmission electron microscopy revealed abnormal structural protrusions resembling bacterial filaments, which are thought to be involved in the reduction of the metals. This process of producing an external filament is completely absent from conventional bacterial respiration and is the center of many current studies.

The mechanisms underlying this bacterium's resistance to and use of heavy metal ions are closely linked to its metabolic pathway web. Putative multidrug efflux transporters, detoxification proteins, extracytoplasmic sigma factors, and PAS domain regulators are shown to have higher expression activity in the presence of heavy metals. Cytochrome c class protein SO3300 also has an elevated transcription. For example, when reducing U(VI), special cytochromes such as MtrC and OmcA are used to form UO_{2} nanoparticles and associate it with biopolymers.

=== Chemical modification ===
In 2017, researchers used a synthetic molecule called DSFO+ to modify cell membranes in two mutant strains of Shewanella. DSFO+ could completely replace natural current-conducting proteins, boosting the power that the microbe generated. The process was a chemical modification only, which did not alter the organism's genome and was divided among the bacteria's offspring, diluting its effect.

=== Pellicle formation ===
Pellicle is a variety of biofilm that is formed between the air and the liquid in which bacteria grow. In a biofilm, bacterial cells interact with each other to protect their community and co-operate metabolically (microbial communities). In S. oneidensis, pellicle formation is typical and is related to the process of reducing heavy metals. Pellicle formation is extensively researched in this species. Pellicle is usually formed in three steps: cells attach to the triple surface of the culture device, air and liquid, then develop a one-layered biofilm from the initial cells, and subsequently mature to a complicated three-dimensional structure. In a developed pellicle, a number of substances between the cells (extracellular polymeric substances) help maintain the pellicle matrix. The process of pellicle formation involves significant microbial activities and related substances. For the extracellular polymeric substances (EPS), many proteins and other biomacromolecules are required.

Many metal cations are also required in the process. EDTA control and extensive cation presence/absence tests show that Ca(II), Mn(II), Cu(II) and Zn(II) are all essential in this process, probably functioning as a part of a coenzyme or prosthetic group. Mg(II) has a partial effect, while Fe(II) and Fe(III) are inhibitory to some degree. Flagella are considered to contribute to pellicle formation. The biofilm needs bacterial cells to move in a certain manner, while flagella are the organelles that provide locomotion. Mutant strains lacking flagella can still form pellicle, albeit much less rapidly.

== Applications ==
=== Nanotechnology ===
Shewanella oneidensis MR-1 can change the oxidation state of metals. These microbial processes allow exploration of novel applications, for example, the biosynthesis of metal nanomaterials. In contrast to chemical and physical methods, microbial processes for synthesizing nanomaterials can be achieved in aqueous phase under gentle and environmentally benign conditions. Many organisms can be utilized to synthesize metal nanomaterials. S. oneidensis is able to reduce a diverse range of metal ions extracellularly, and this extracellular production greatly facilitates the extraction of nanomaterials. The extracellular electron transport chains responsible for transferring electrons across cell membranes are relatively well characterized, in particular outer membrane c-type cytochromes MtrC and OmcA. A 2013 study suggested that it is possible to alter particle size and activity of extracellular biogenic nanoparticles via controlled expression of the genes encoding surface proteins. An important example is the synthesis of silver nanoparticle by S. oneidensis, where its antibacterial activity can be influenced by the expression of outer membrane c-type cytochromes. Silver nanoparticles are considered a new generation of antimicrobial agents, as they exhibit biocidal activity against a broad range of bacteria and are gaining importance as antibiotic resistance among pathogenic bacteria increases. Shewanella has been seen in laboratory settings to bioreduce a substantial amount of palladium and dechlorinate near 70% of polychlorinated biphenyls (PCBs). The production of nanoparticles by S. oneidensis MR-1 are closely associated to the MTR pathway (e.g. silver nanoparticles), or the hydrogenase pathway (e.g. palladium nanoparticles).

=== Wastewater treatment ===
Shewanella oneidensis' ability to reduce and absorb heavy metals makes it a candidate for use in wastewater treatment.

DSFO+ could enable bacteria to electrically communicate with an electrode and generate electricity in a wastewater application.

== Genome ==
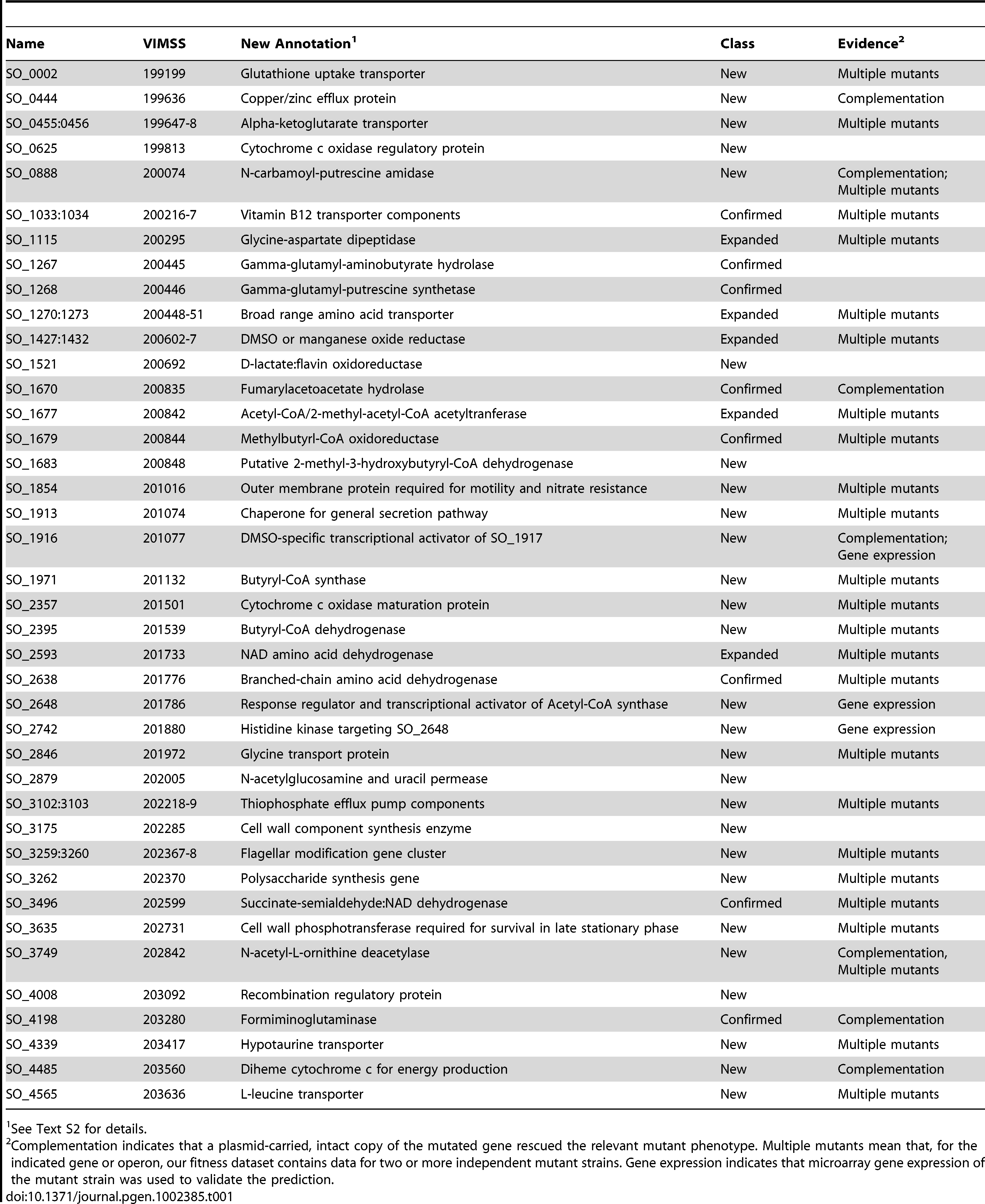
Table showing S. oneidensis MR-1 gene annotations.

As a facultative anaerobe with a branching electron transport pathway, S. oneidensis is considered a model organism in microbiology. In 2002, its genomic sequence was published. It has a 4.9Mb circular chromosome that is predicted to encode 4,758 protein open reading frames. It has a 161kb plasmid with 173 open reading frames. A re-annotation was made in 2003.
