= Biocompatibility =

Biologically compatible substance

IUPAC definition

Biocompatibility (biomedical therapy): Ability of a material to perform with an appropriate host response in a specific application. (Note: The more general definition could be adopted by the biomedical field.)

Biocompatibility: Ability to be in contact with a living system without producing an adverse effect.

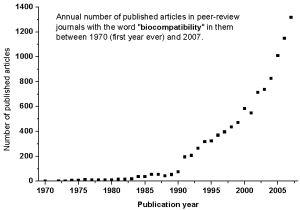

Biocompatibility is related to the behavior of biomaterials in various contexts. The term refers to the ability of a material to perform with an appropriate host response in a specific situation. The ambiguity of the term reflects the ongoing development of insights into how biomaterials interact with the human body and eventually how those interactions determine the clinical success of a medical device (such as pacemaker, hip replacement or stent). Modern medical devices and prostheses are often made of more than one material so it might not always be sufficient to talk about the biocompatibility of a specific material.

Since the immune response and repair functions in the body are so complicated it is not adequate to describe the biocompatibility of a single material in relation to a single cell type or tissue. Sometimes one hears of biocompatibility testing that is a large battery of in vitro test that is used in accordance with ISO 10993 (or other similar standards) to determine if a certain material (or rather biomedical product) is biocompatible. These tests do not determine the biocompatibility of a material, but they constitute an important step towards the animal testing and finally clinical trials that will determine the biocompatibility of the material in a given application, and thus medical devices such as implants or drug delivery devices. Research results have concluded that during performing in vitro cytotoxicity testing of biomaterials, "the authors should carefully specify the conditions of the test and comparison of different studies should be carried out with caution".

== History ==
The word biocompatibility was mentioned for the first time in peer-review journals and meetings in 1970 by RJ Hegyeli (Amer Chem Soc Annual Meeting abstract) and CA Homsy. It took almost two decades before it began to be commonly used in scientific literature.

Recently, Williams has been trying to reevaluate the current knowledge status regarding what factors determine clinical success. Doing so notes that an implant may not always have to be positively bioactive but it must not do any harm (either locally or systemically).

== Five definitions of biocompatibility ==
1. "The quality of not having toxic or injurious effects on biological systems".
2. "The ability of a material to perform with an appropriate host response in a specific application", Williams' definition.
3. "Comparison of the tissue response produced through the close association of the implanted candidate material to its implant site within the host animal to that tissue response recognised and established as suitable with control materials" - ASTM
4. "Refers to the ability of a biomaterial to perform its desired function with respect to a medical therapy, without eliciting any undesirable local or systemic effects in the recipient or beneficiary of that therapy, but generating the most appropriate beneficial cellular or tissue response in that specific situation, and optimising the clinically relevant performance of that therapy".
5. "Biocompatibility is the capability of a prosthesis implanted in the body to exist in harmony with tissue without causing deleterious changes".

== Comments on the above five definitions ==
1. The Dorland Medical definition is not recommended according to Williams Dictionary since it only defines biocompatibility as the absence of host response and does not include any desired or positive interactions between the host tissue and the biomaterials.
2. This is also called the “Williams definition” or “William's definition”. It was defined in the European Society for Biomaterials Consensus Conference I and can more easily be found in ‘The Williams Dictionary of Biomaterials’.
3. The ASTM is not recommended according to Williams Dictionary since it only refers to local tissue responses, in animal models.
4. The fourth is an expansion or rather more precise version of the first definition noting both that low toxicity and the one should be aware of the different demands between various medical applications of the same material.

All these definitions deal with materials and not with devices. This is a drawback since many medical devices are made of more than one material. Much of the pre-clinical testing of the materials is not conducted on the devices but rather the material itself. But at some stage the testing will have to include the device since the shape, geometry and surface treatment etc. of the device will also affect its biocompatibility.

=== ‘Biocompatible’ ===
In the literature, one quite often stumbles upon the adjective form, ‘biocompatible’. However, according to Williams’ definition, this does not make any sense because biocompatibility is contextual, i.e. much more than just the material itself will determine the clinical outcome of the medical device of which the biomaterial is a part. This also points to one of the weaknesses with the current definition because a medical device usually is made of more than one material.

Metallic glasses based on magnesium with zinc and calcium addition are tested as the potential biocompatible metallic biomaterials for biodegradable medical implants

Biocompatibility (or tissue compatibility) describes the ability of a material to perform with an appropriate host response when applied as intended. A biocompatible material may not be completely "inert"; in fact, the appropriateness of the host response is decisive.

=== Suggested sub-definitions ===
The scope of the first definition is so wide that D Williams tried to find suitable subgroups of applications in order to be able to make more narrow definitions. In the MDT article from 2003 the chosen supgroups and their definitions were:

Biocompatibility of long-term implanted devices
The biocompatibility of a long-term implantable medical device refers to the ability of the device to perform its intended function, with the desired degree of incorporation in the host, without eliciting any undesirable local or systemic effects in that host.

Biocompatibility of short-term implantable devices
The biocompatibility of a medical device that is intentionally placed within the cardiovascular system for transient diagnostic or therapeutic purposes refers to the ability of the device to carry out its intended function within flowing blood, with minimal interaction between device and blood that adversely affects device performance, and without inducing uncontrolled activation of cellular or plasma protein cascades.

Biocompatibility of tissue-engineering products
The biocompatibility of a scaffold or matrix for tissue-engineering products refers to the ability to perform as a substrate that will support the appropriate cellular activity, including the facilitation of molecular and mechanical signalling systems, in order to optimise tissue regeneration, without eliciting any undesirable effects in those cells, or inducing any undesirable local or systemic responses in the eventual host.

In these definitions the notion of biocompatibility is related to devices rather than to materials as compared to top three definitions. There was a consensus conference on biomaterial definitions in Sorrento September 15–16, 2005.

== See also ==
- Biocompatible material
- Biomaterial
- Medical device
- ISO 10993
- Medical implant
- Medical grade silicone
- Bovine submaxillary mucin coatings
- Titanium biocompatibility
