= Hydrolysate =

Hydrolysate refers to any product of hydrolysis. Protein hydrolysate has special application in sports medicine because its consumption allows amino acids to be absorbed by the body more rapidly than intact proteins, thus maximizing nutrient delivery to muscle tissues. It is also used in the biotechnology industry as a supplement to cell cultures. In the December 2013 edition of The International Journal of Food Science and Technology, hydrolysate was shown to be rich in L-aspartic acid and the necessary minerals manganese and selenium
