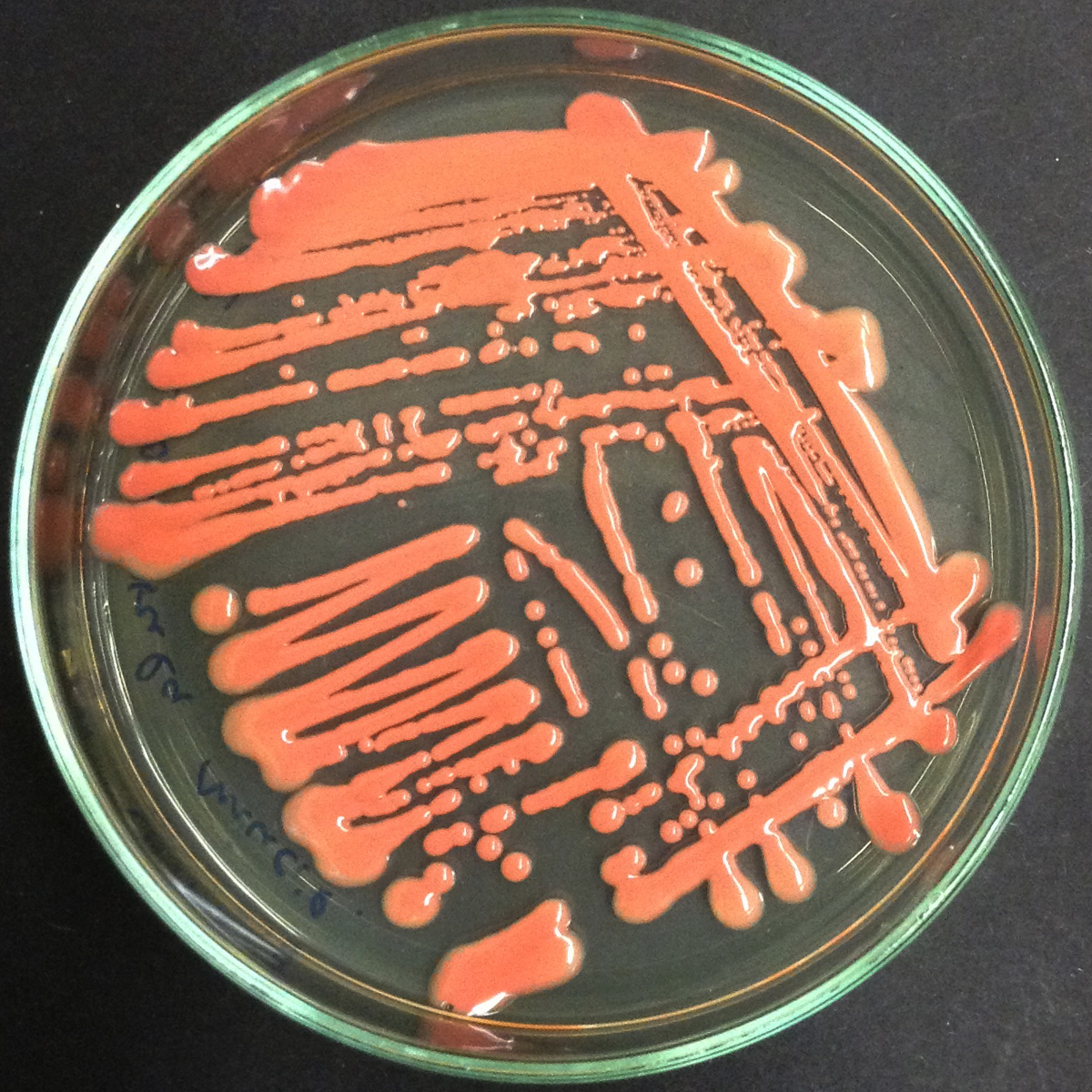
- Rhodotorula mucilaginosa colonies on yeast extract glucose chloramphenicol agar (YGC).

Scientific classification
- Kingdom: Fungi
- Division: Basidiomycota
- Class: Microbotryomycetes
- Order: Sporidiobolales; Doweld (2001)
- Family: Sporidiobolaceae; R.T. Moore (1980)

Genera
- Rhodosporidiobolus; Rhodotorula; Sporobolomyces

= Sporidiobolaceae =

Order of fungi

The Sporidiobolales are an order of fungi in the subdivision Pucciniomycotina. The order contains a single family, the Sporidiobolaceae, which currently contains three genera. Most species are known only from their yeast states. Hyphal states produce teliospores from which auricularioid (tubular and laterally septate) basidia emerge, bearing basidiospores. Species occur worldwide and have been isolated (as yeasts) from a wide variety of substrates. Two species, Rhodotorula mucilaginosa and R. glutinis, have been known to cause disease in humans.
