= Christine Rollier =

British immunologist

- Born: France
- Education: University of Lyon
- Scientific career
- Workplaces: Oxford Vaccine Group; Jenner Institute; University of Oxford; University of Surrey
- Thesis: Etude, à l'aide du virus de l'hépatite B du canard, de l'immunisation génétique pour la prévention et le traitement de l'hépatite B (2000)

Christine Rollier is a French vaccinologist who is a professor at the University of Surrey. She focuses on the development of vaccines to prevent infectious diseases. In particular, Rollier has focused on the development of vaccinations to eliminate the plague.

== Early life and education ==
Rollier was born in France. She was an undergraduate student in biochemistry at the University of Lyon. Her doctoral research considered DNA immunisation as a therapeutic tool to treat people with Hepatitis B. She worked alongside physicians at the Inserm (Institut National de la Santé et Recherche Medicale).

== Research and career ==
After earning her doctorate, Rollier moved to the Biomedical Primate Research Center in The Netherlands, where she worked for five years on the development of vaccines against Hepatitis C. Rollier joined the Jenner Institute in 2007, where she worked as a senior immunologist to improve viral vectored based vaccines. Her first position at Oxford was in the laboratory of Adrian Hill. In 2010, she joined the Oxford Vaccine Group. She was interested in the design of viral vector vaccines specifically for bacterial diseases. Rollier focused on bacterial and infectious diseases that affect children such as group B meningococcus and whooping cough. She has also focused on vaccine candidates to fight the plague, typhoid and paratyphoid fever.

In the early days of the COVID-19 pandemic, Rollier shifted her focus to support the Oxford's work on developing a COVID-19 vaccine. She worked on a vaccine against the plague, which made use of the ChAdOx1 vaccine vector. Outbreaks of the plague continue to occur around the world, impacting communities across rural Africa and the United States. The disease is endemic in Madagascar, with outbreaks in 2017 and 2021. ChAdOx1 is a weakened version of chimpanzee adenoviridae (the common cold virus). Specifically, Rollier and co-workers added genes to generate proteins from Yersinia pestis, the plague bacterium. These proteins are important in the plague bacterium infection pathway, and teach the body to recognise and fight against plague bacteria. Rollier has said it is challenging to develop vaccinations against the plague as this is a disease affecting underprivileged populations.

In 2021, Rollier moved to the University of Surrey, where she was made Professor of Vaccinology.

== Selected publications ==
- Christine S Rollier; Arturo Reyes-Sandoval; Matthew G Cottingham; Katie Ewer; Adrian V S Hill (20 April 2011). "Viral vectors as vaccine platforms: deployment in sight". Current Opinion in Immunology. 23 (3): 377–382. doi:10.1016/j.coi.2011.03.006. ISSN 0952-7915. PMID 21514130. Wikidata Q37868123.
- Christine S Rollier; Glaucia Paranhos-Baccala; Ernst J Verschoor; et al. (1 March 2007). "Vaccine-induced early control of hepatitis C virus infection in chimpanzees fails to impact on hepatic PD-1 and chronicity". Hepatology. 45 (3): 602–613. doi:10.1002/hep.21573. ISSN 0270-9139. PMID 17326154. Wikidata Q43036305.
- Katie J. Ewer; Teresa Lambe; Christine S Rollier; Alexandra Spencer; Adrian V. S. Hill; Lucy Dorrell (August 2016). "Viral vectors as vaccine platforms: from immunogenicity to impact". Current Opinion in Immunology. 41: 47–54. doi:10.1016/j.coi.2016.05.014. ISSN 0952-7915. PMID 27286566. Wikidata Q24574798.

== Personal life ==
Rollier has two children, and took an eighteen-month career break after having her first child.
