= 1Day Sooner =

Public health nonprofit

- Founded: March 2020
- Type: Nonprofit organization
- Purpose: Human challenge studies, Covid-19, public health policy
- Key people: Joshua Morrison (Founder)
- Website: 1daysooner.org

1Day Sooner is a nonprofit that advocates for people who want to participate in medical research, in particular human challenge trials. 1Day Sooner began in March 2020 in response to the COVID-19 pandemic, organizing people willing to volunteer in human challenge trials as a means to speed development of vaccines against the disease. 1Day Sooner's advocacy for COVID-19 challenge trials was met with both support and opposition among the public, scientists, and bioethicists. COVID-19 challenge trials were ultimately implemented in the United Kingdom.

1Day Sooner also conducts advocacy work on public health policy and for challenge trials in other infectious diseases.

== Covid-19 challenge trials ==
1Day Sooner was established by Josh Morrison, a founder of kidney donation group Waitlist Zero, and Sophie Rose, a Stanford biology graduate. Morrison and Rose were motivated to do so after reading about how human challenge trials in young, healthy volunteers could potentially accelerate COVID-19 vaccine development, and set up an initial signup website in March 2020 for people interested in being a research subject in COVID-19 human challenge studies.

By October 2020, over 38,500 had expressed interest in participation via the website.

A survey study of 1Day Sooner prospective volunteers found that they were more likely to display altruistic behaviors, such as charitable donations or blood donation, than a control group. The study argued that this potentially addressed concerns of some bioethicists regarding the potential exploitation of volunteers.

1Day Sooner viewed challenge trials as a means to promote the development of multiple vaccines, particularly ones accessible in low-income countries, as well as gain more insight into COVID-19 immunity. If early vaccine candidates in development in 2020 had turned out to be ineffective, moreover, 1Day Sooner argued challenge trials could have been used to prioritize most promising vaccines from remaining candidates. The organization held that if challenge trials could result in a benefit for society, informed individuals should be allowed the freedom to volunteer themselves, even in the face of potentially serious risks.

The government of the United Kingdom announced in October 2020 that it would sponsor COVID-19 human challenge trials. 1Day Sooner called for the COVID-19 study protocols to be published before the studies began recruiting.

In August 2020, the United States government made preparations to manufacture a strain of the virus to be used in potential human challenge trials partially as a result of advocacy by 1Day Sooner. As of 2022, such trials have not been implemented in the United States.

=== Support ===
1Day Sooner organized an open letter signed by 125 scientists, academics, and other public figures to Francis Collins of the National Institutes of Health, urging the United States government to begin immediate preparations for COVID-19 human challenge trials in July 2020. Signatories included vaccinologists Adrian V. S. Hill and Stanley Plotkin and 15 Nobel laureates.

=== Opposition ===
Other scientists and bioethicists disagreed with the prospect of COVID-19 challenge trials as advocated by 1Day Sooner. Collins, Anthony Fauci and two other scientists argued that the results from a challenge trial, which would be conducted in healthy, young volunteers (at lower risk for serious illness), would not necessarily reflect efficacy in at-risk groups like the elderly, nor would they provide useful information on transmissibility. Other scientists, like Angela Rasmussen, similarly argued that it was too dangerous to ethically conduct COVID-19 challenge trials given the unknowns of the disease at the time. Others in addition contended that 1Day Sooner was mistaken in assuming that human challenge trials would go substantially faster than traditional field trials in the context of a global pandemic where transmission of the virus was widespread; at the time, some Phase III vaccine trials had already begun.

== Other advocacy ==
1Day Sooner lobbied for a national vaccine day in the United States, a federal holiday dedicated to promoting vaccination in 2021. The organization subsequently sponsored a Boston Vaccine Day event in September 2021.

1Day Sooner also supports challenge trials for other diseases, including hepatitis C and tuberculosis.

1Day Africa, the African division of 1Day Sooner, focuses on accelerating vaccine development and promoting global access and distribution to vaccines.
