= Eleanor Barnes =

British physician

- Education: University of Oxford; St Bartholomew's Hospital
- Scientific career
- Workplaces: John Radcliffe Hospital; University of Oxford
- Thesis: T-cell and dendritic cell function and the effects of combination therapy in Hepatitis C virus infection (2004)

Eleanor Barnes is a British physician at the John Radcliffe Hospital and a Professor of Hepatology and Experimental Medicine at the University of Oxford. She has studied hepatitis C and the development of the development of HCV vaccines. She is a Fellow of the Academy of Medical Sciences and serves as the lead for hepatology at the National Institute for Health Research (NIHR) Clinical Research Network.

== Early life and education ==
Barnes has said that she was interested in science as a child. She decided to study medicine at university, and eventually trained at St Bartholomew's Hospital. She completed an intercalated bachelor's degree in anthropology and philosophy. After graduating, she worked as a medical resident at the Royal Free Hospital, where she decided to specialise in hepatology and gastroenterology. Determined to pursue a career in research, Barnes worked unpaid for three months, during which time she obtained data that she used to apply for a fellowship from the Medical Research Council. She was a doctoral researcher at the University of Oxford. Her doctoral research considered T cell and dendritic cell function.

== Research and career ==
Barners' research considers T cell immunology. She is focused on the translation of laboratory findings to clinical environments. Barnes worked as a Medical Research Council Senior Fellow at the University of Oxford, and eventually was appointed lead of herpetology in the Thames Valley. She studied why 80% of patients with hepatitis C get chronic infection. Barnes identified that the nature of the T cell response determines which pathway a patient goes down. This observation led Barnes to develop an T-cell vaccine to prevent hepatitis C infection. The vaccine is based on adenoviral vectors, which host the non-structural proteins of hepatitis C from a genotype 1B strain. There are seven major hepatitis C strains, which presents considerable challenges for the development of vaccines. Barnes was elected Fellow of the Academy of Medical Sciences in 2018.

During the COVID-19 pandemic, Barnes studied the design, effectiveness and implementation of the COVID-19 vaccine. She showed that patients who suffered from COVID-19 were likely to be impacted by liver problems.

== Selected publications ==
- Jane P Messina; Isla Humphreys; Abraham Flaxman; Anthony Brown; Graham S Cooke; Oliver G Pybus; Eleanor Barnes (28 July 2014). "Global distribution and prevalence of hepatitis C virus genotypes". Hepatology. 61 (1): 77–87. doi:10.1002/hep.27259. ISSN 0270-9139. PMC 4303918. PMID 25069599. Wikidata Q34431175.
- Merryn Voysey; Sue Ann Costa Clemens; Shabir A Madhi; et al. (8 December 2020). "Safety and efficacy of the ChAdOx1 nCoV-19 vaccine (AZD1222) against SARS-CoV-2: an interim analysis of four randomised controlled trials in Brazil, South Africa, and the UK". The Lancet. 397 (10269): 99–111. doi:10.1016/s0140-6736(20)32661-1. ISSN 0140-6736. PMC 7723445. PMID 33306989. Wikidata Q104286457.
- Pedro M Folegatti; Katie J Ewer; Parvinder K Aley; et al. (20 July 2020). "Safety and immunogenicity of the ChAdOx1 nCoV-19 vaccine against SARS-CoV-2: a preliminary report of a phase 1/2, single-blind, randomised controlled trial". The Lancet. doi:10.1016/s0140-6736(20)31604-4. ISSN 0140-6736. PMC 7445431. PMID 32702298. Wikidata Q97678476.

== Personal life ==
Barnes is married with two children.
