= History of COVID-19 vaccine development =

Scientific work to develop a vaccine for COVID-19

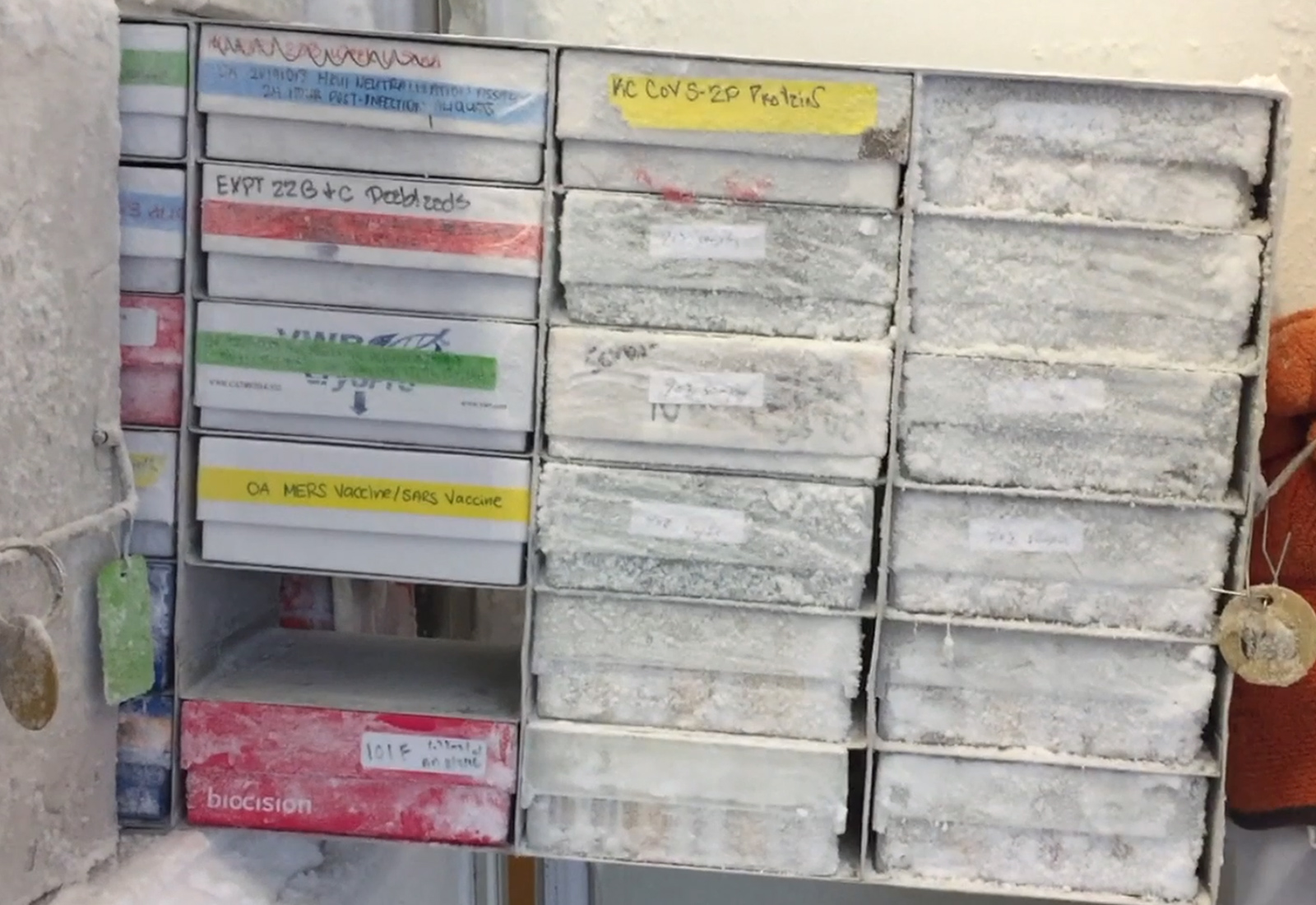
COVID‑19 vaccine research samples in a NIAID lab freezer (30 January 2020)

SARS-CoV-2, the virus that causes COVID-19, was isolated in late 2019. Its genetic sequence was published on 11 January 2020, setting off an intense research effort to develop a COVID-19 vaccine. Vaccine development was expedited via unprecedented collaboration between academia, the pharmaceutical industry and governments. By June 2020, tens of billions of dollars were being invested to develop dozens of vaccine candidates and prepare for global vaccination programs. According to the Coalition for Epidemic Preparedness Innovations (CEPI), the geographic distribution of COVID‑19 vaccine development shows North American entities to have about 40% of the activity, compared to 30% in Asia and Australia, 26% in Europe, and a few projects in South America and Africa.

In February 2020, the World Health Organization (WHO) said it did not expect a vaccine against SARS‑CoV‑2 to become available in less than 18 months. Virologist Paul Offit commented that, in hindsight, the development of a safe and effective vaccine within 11 months was a remarkable feat. The rapidly growing infection rate of COVID‑19 worldwide during 2020 stimulated international alliances and government efforts to urgently organize resources to make multiple vaccines on shortened timelines; Four vaccine candidates entered human evaluation in March.

On 24 June 2020, China approved the CanSino vaccine for limited use in the military and two inactivated virus vaccines for emergency use in high-risk occupations. On 11 August 2020, Russia announced the approval of its Sputnik V vaccine for emergency use, though one month later only small amounts of the vaccine had been distributed for use outside of the phase 3 trial.

The Pfizer–BioNTech partnership submitted an Emergency Use Authorization (EUA) request to the U.S. Food and Drug Administration (FDA) for their mRNA vaccine on 20 November 2020. On 2 December 2020, the United Kingdom's Medicines and Healthcare products Regulatory Agency (MHRA) gave temporary regulatory approval for the Pfizer–BioNTech vaccine, becoming the first country to approve the vaccine and the first country in the Western world to approve the use of any COVID‑19 vaccine. The US and the EU followed later that month. The US also granted an EUA for the Moderna COVID-19 vaccine in December. Bahrain and the United Arab Emirates granted emergency marketing authorization for the Sinopharm BIBP vaccine.

On 31 March 2021, the Russian government announced that they had registered the first COVID‑19 vaccine for animals. Named Carnivac-Cov, it is an inactivated vaccine for carnivorous animals, including pets, aimed at preventing mutations that occur during the interspecies transmission of SARS-CoV-2.

In October 2022, China began administering an oral vaccine developed by CanSino Biologics using its adenovirus model.

Despite the availability of mRNA and viral vector vaccines, worldwide vaccine equity has not been achieved. The ongoing development and use of whole inactivated virus (WIV) and protein-based vaccines has been recommended, especially for use in developing countries, to dampen further waves of the pandemic.

== Planning and investment ==
Since 2020, vaccine development has been expedited via unprecedented collaboration in the multinational pharmaceutical industry and between governments. According to the Coalition for Epidemic Preparedness Innovations (CEPI), the geographic distribution of COVID‑19 vaccine development puts North American entities having about 40% of the activity compared to 30% in Asia and Australia, 26% in Europe, and a few projects in South America and Africa.

Commitment to first-in-human testing of a vaccine candidate represents a substantial capital cost for vaccine developers, estimated to be from US$14 million to US$25 million for a typical Phase I trial program, but possibly as much as US$70 million. For comparison, during the Ebola virus epidemic of 2013–16, there were 37 vaccine candidates in urgent development with only one becoming a licensed vaccine at a total cost to confirm efficacy in Phase II–III trials of about US$1 billion.

=== International organizations ===
==== Access to COVID‑19 Tools (ACT) Accelerator ====
The Access to COVID-19 Tools Accelerator (ACT Accelerator or ACT-A), or the Global Collaboration to Accelerate the Development, Production and Equitable Access to New COVID-19 diagnostics, therapeutics and vaccines, is a G20 initiative announced by pro-tem Chair Mohammed al-Jadaan on 24 April 2020. A call to action was published simultaneously by the World Health Organization (WHO) on 24 April. As of January 2022, it was the largest international effort to achieve equitable access to COVID-19 health technologies.

=== National governments ===
Canada announced CA$275 million in funding for 96 vaccine research projects at Canadian companies and universities, with plans to establish a "vaccine bank" that could be used if another coronavirus outbreak occurs. A further investment of CA$1.1 billion was added to support clinical trials and develop manufacturing and supply chains for vaccines. On 4 May, the Canadian government committed CA$850 million to the WHO's live streaming effort to raise US$8 billion for COVID‑19 vaccines and preparedness.

China provided low-rate loans to a vaccine developer through its central bank and "quickly made land available for the company" to build production plants. As of June 2020, six of the eleven COVID‑19 vaccine candidates in early-stage human testing were developed by Chinese organizations. Three Chinese vaccine companies and research institutes are supported by the government for financing research, conducting clinical trials, and manufacturing the most promising vaccine candidates, prioritizing rapid evidence of efficacy over safety. On 18 May, China had pledged US$2 billion to support overall efforts by the WHO for programs against COVID‑19. On 22 July, China announced plans to provide a US$1 billion loan to make its vaccine accessible for Latin America and the Caribbean. On 24 August, Chinese Premier Li Keqiang announced it would provide Cambodia, Laos, Myanmar, Thailand, and Vietnam priority access to the vaccine once it was distributed.

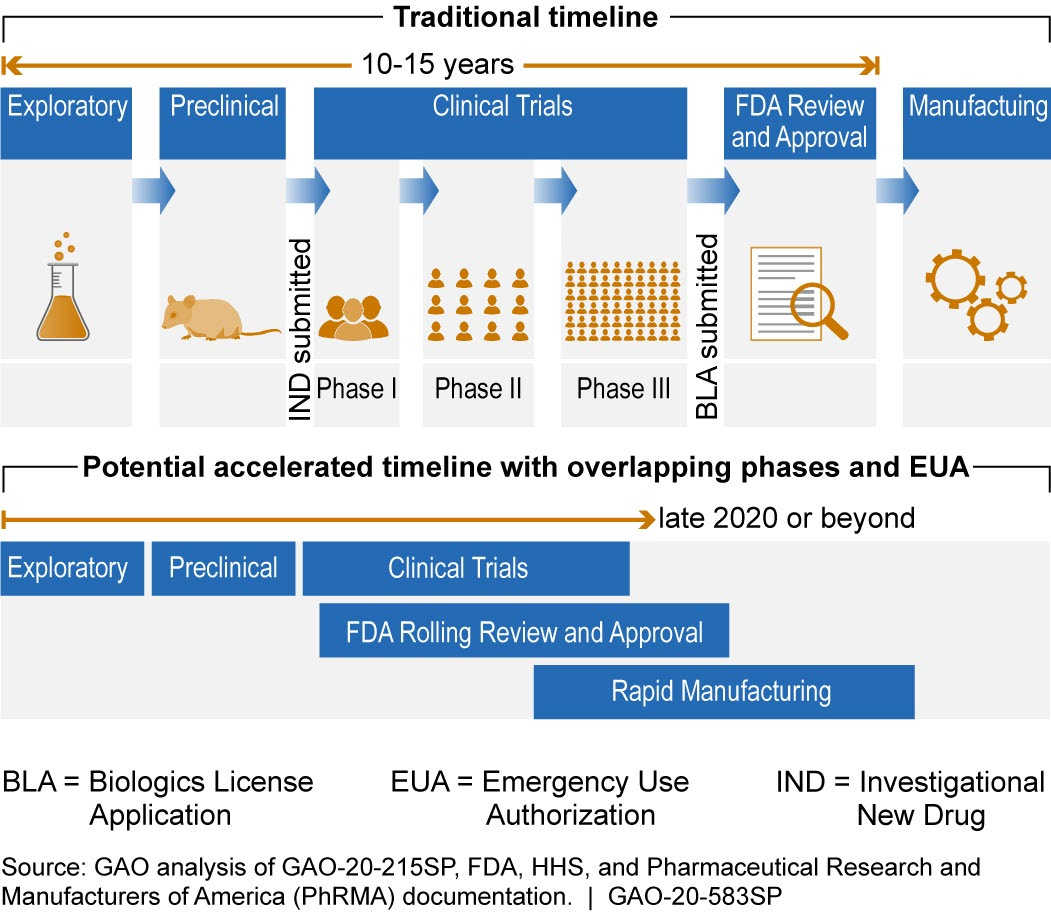
US Government Accountability Office diagram comparing a traditional vaccine development timeline to a safe, possible expedited method timeline.

Great Britain formed a COVID‑19 vaccine task force in April 2020, to stimulate local efforts for accelerated development of a vaccine through collaborations of industry, universities, and government agencies. It encompassed every phase of development from research to manufacturing. The vaccine development initiatives at the University of Oxford and Imperial College of London were financed with £44 million.

In the United States, the Biomedical Advanced Research and Development Authority (BARDA), a federal agency funding disease-fighting technology, announced investments of nearly US$1 billion to support American COVID‑19 vaccine development and manufacture of the most promising candidates. On 16 April, BARDA made a US$483 million investment in vaccine developer Moderna and its partner, Johnson & Johnson. BARDA has earmarked an additional US$4 billion for development. It will have a role in other programs for development of six to eight vaccine candidates destined for clinical study into 2021 by companies such as Sanofi Pasteur and Regeneron. On 15 May, the government announced funding for a fast-track program called Operation Warp Speed to place multiple vaccine candidates into clinical trials by the fall of 2020 and manufacture 300 million doses of a licensed vaccine by January 2021. The project's chief advisor is Moncef Slaoui and its chief operating officer is General Gustave Perna. In June, the Warp Speed team said it would work with seven companies developing vaccine candidates: Moderna, Johnson & Johnson, Merck, Pfizer, the University of Oxford in collaboration with AstraZeneca, and two others, although Pfizer later stated that "all the investment for R&D was made by Pfizer at risk."

=== Pharmaceutical companies ===
Large pharmaceutical companies with experience in making vaccines at scale, including Johnson & Johnson, AstraZeneca, and GlaxoSmithKline (GSK), formed alliances with biotechnology companies, governments, and universities to accelerate progression to an effective vaccine. To combine financial and manufacturing capabilities for a pandemic with adjuvanted vaccine technology, GSK joined with Sanofi in an uncommon partnership of multinational companies to support accelerated vaccine development.

By June 2020, tens of billions of dollars were invested by corporations, governments, international health organizations, and university research groups to develop dozens of vaccine candidates and prepare for global vaccination programs to immunize against COVID‑19 infection. The corporate investment and need to generate value for public shareholders raised concerns about a "market-based approach" in vaccine development, costly pricing of eventual licensed vaccines, preferred access for distribution first to affluent countries, and sparse or no distribution to where the pandemic is most aggressive, as predicted for densely populated, impoverished countries unable to afford vaccinations. The collaboration of the University of Oxford with AstraZeneca (a global pharmaceutical company based in the UK) raised concerns about price and sharing of eventual profits from international vaccine sales, arising from whether the British government and university as public partners had commercialization rights. AstraZeneca stated that initial pricing of its vaccine would not include a profit margin for the company while the pandemic was still expanding.

In June, AstraZeneca made a US$750 million deal allowing CEPI and Gavi, the Vaccine Alliance to manufacture and distribute 300 million doses if its Oxford vaccine candidate proved to be safe and effective, reportedly increasing the company's total production capacity to over 2 billion doses per year. Commercialization of pandemic vaccines is a high-risk business venture, potentially losing billions of dollars in development and pre-market manufacturing costs if the candidate vaccines fail to be safe and effective. Pfizer indicated it was not interested in a government partnership, considering it to be a "third party" slowing progress. Further, there are concerns that rapid-development programs – like Operation Warp Speed – are choosing candidates mainly for their manufacturing advantages rather than optimal safety and efficacy.

== Development ==
CEPI classifies development stages for vaccines as "exploratory" (planning and designing a candidate, having no evaluation in vivo), "preclinical" (in vivo evaluation with preparation for manufacturing a compound to test in humans), or initiation of Phase I safety studies in healthy people. Some 321 total vaccine candidates were in development as either confirmed projects in clinical trials or in early-stage "exploratory" or "preclinical" development, as of September.

=== Early development ===
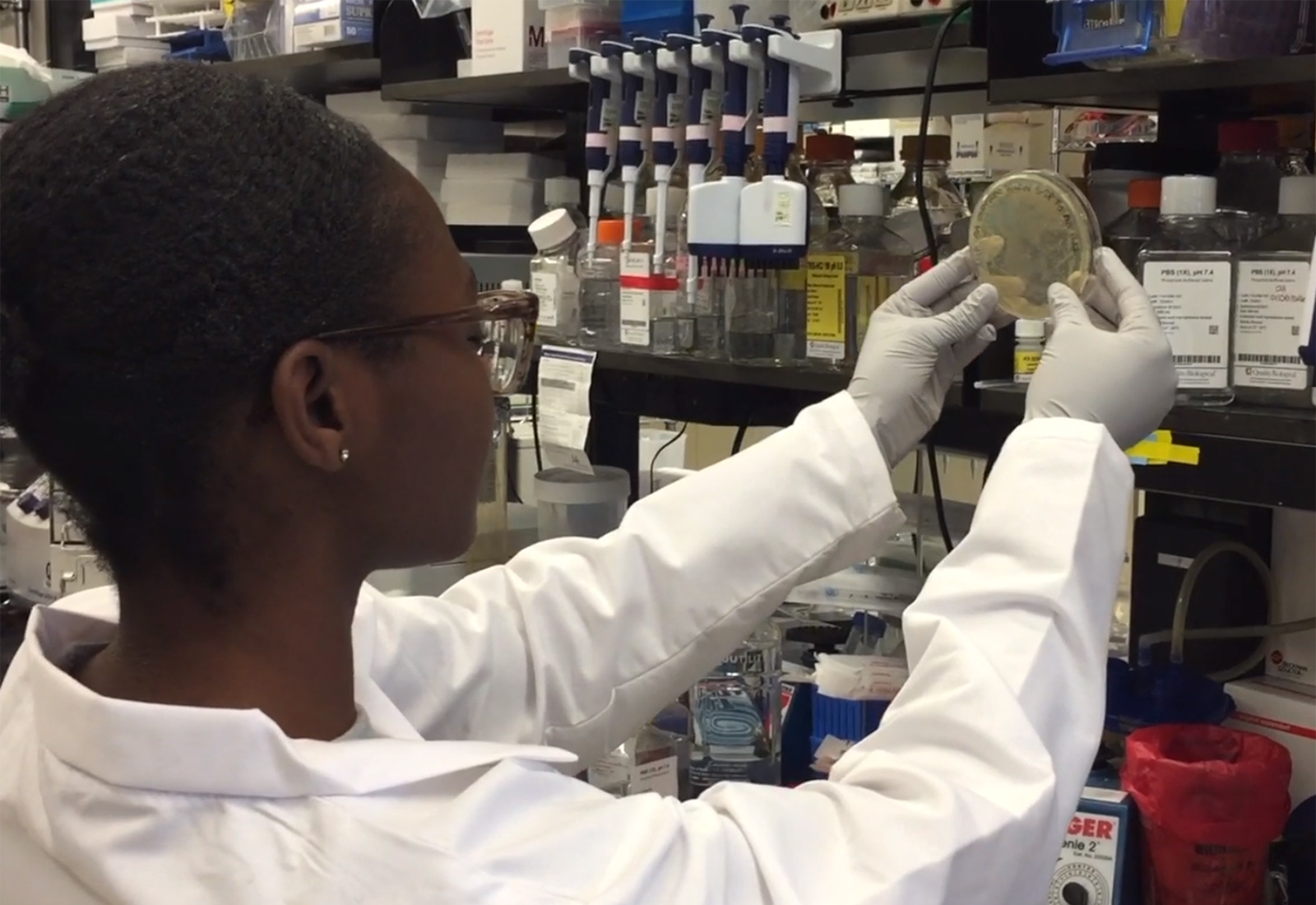
NIAID (NIH) scientist researching COVID‑19 vaccine examines agar plate. (30 January 2020)

After a coronavirus was isolated in December 2019, its genetic sequence was published on 11 January 2020, triggering an urgent international response to prepare for an outbreak and hasten development of a preventive vaccine.

In February 2020, the WHO said it did not expect a vaccine against severe acute respiratory syndrome coronavirus 2 (SARS-CoV-2), the causative virus, to become available in less than 18 months. The rapidly growing infection rate of COVID‑19 worldwide during 2020 stimulated international alliances and government efforts to urgently organize resources to make multiple vaccines on shortened timelines, with four vaccine candidates entering human evaluation in March (see the table of clinical trials started in 2020, below).

By April 2020, "almost 80 companies and institutes in 19 countries" were working on this virtual gold rush. Also in April, CEPI estimated that as many as six of the vaccine candidates against COVID‑19 should be chosen by international coalitions for development through Phase II–III trials, and three should be streamlined through regulatory and quality assurance for eventual licensing at a total cost of at least US$2 billion. Another analysis estimates ten candidates will need simultaneous initial development, before a select few are chosen for the final path to licensing.

=== Cyber-espionage efforts ===
In July 2020, the UK's National Cyber Security Centre, the Canadian Communications Security Establishment, and the U.S.'s Homeland Security Department Cybersecurity and Infrastructure Security Agency, and the National Security Agency (NSA) issued a joint statement saying that Russian state-backed hackers, specifically Cozy Bear (APT29) were attempting to steal COVID‑19 treatment and vaccine research from academic and pharmaceutical institutions in other countries. Russia denied the claim, but has a history of cyber-espionage and cyberattacks on foreign targets. In November 2020, Microsoft reported that the Russian state-sponsored hacking group Fancy Bear (APT28) and North Korean state-sponsored hacking groups nicknamed "Zinc" and "Cerium" had been implicated in recent cyberattacks against researchers developing a COVID-19 vaccine (including in Canada, France, India, South Korea, and the U.S.) as well as against the World Health Organization, and that the cyberattackers had used both brute force and phishing techniques to compromise computer systems. Microsoft reported that at least nine healthcare institutions were targeted, and that some attempts were successful. In February 2021, South Korean's National Intelligence Service gave a closed-door briefing to members of the South Korean parliament about North Korean efforts to steal COVID-19 vaccine technology from Pfizer.

=== Preclinical research ===
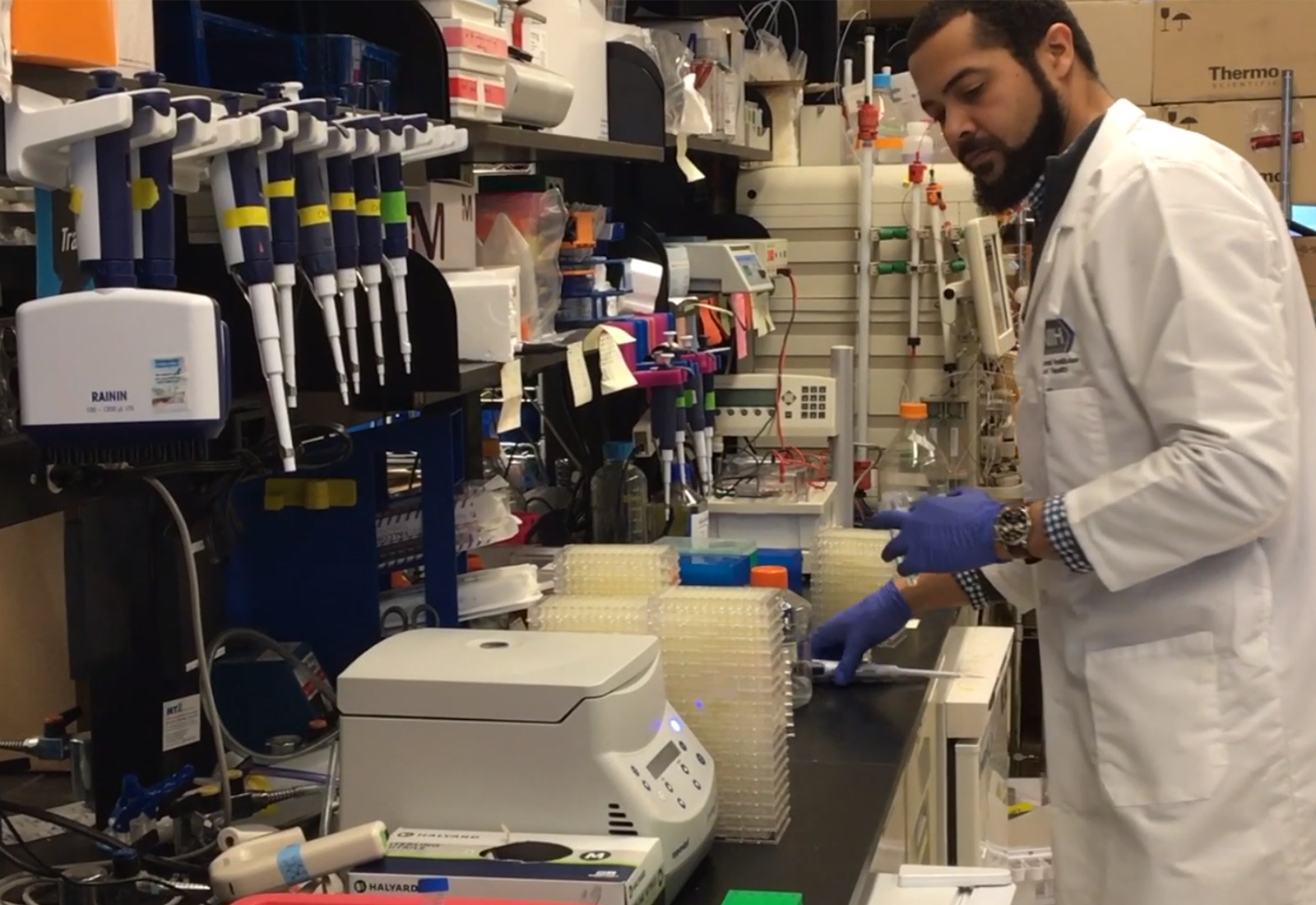
NIAID (NIH) scientist researching COVID‑19 vaccine. (30 January 2020)

In April 2020, the WHO issued a statement representing dozens of vaccine scientists around the world, pledging collaboration to speed development of a vaccine against COVID‑19. The WHO coalition is encouraging international cooperation between organizations developing vaccine candidates, national regulatory and policy agencies, financial contributors, public health associations, and governments, for eventual manufacturing of a successful vaccine in quantities sufficient to supply all affected regions, particularly low-resource countries.

Industry analysis of past vaccine development shows failure rates of 84–90%. Because COVID‑19 is a novel virus target with properties still being discovered and requiring innovative vaccine technologies and development strategies, the risks associated with developing a successful vaccine across all steps of preclinical and clinical research are high.

To assess the potential for vaccine efficacy, unprecedented computer simulations and new COVID‑19-specific animal models are being developed multinationally. Of the confirmed active vaccine candidates, about 70% are being developed by private companies, with the remaining projects under development by academic, government coalitions, and health organizations. Historically, the probability of success for an infectious disease vaccine candidate to pass preclinical barriers and reach Phase I of human testing is 41–57%.

=== Challenges ===
The rapid development and urgency of producing a vaccine for the COVID‑19 pandemic may increase the risks and failure rate of delivering a safe, effective vaccine. One study found that between 2006 and 2015, the success rate of obtaining approval from Phase I to successful Phase III trials was 16.2% for vaccines, and CEPI indicates a potential success rate of only 10% for vaccine candidates in 2020 development.

Research at universities is obstructed by physical distancing and closing of laboratories.

==== Biosafety ====
Early research to assess vaccine efficacy using COVID‑19-specific animal models, such as ACE2-transgenic mice, other laboratory animals, and non-human primates, indicates a need for biosafety-level 3 containment measures for handling live viruses, and international coordination to ensure standardized safety procedures.

==== Antibody-dependent enhancement ====
Although the quality and quantity of antibody production by a potential vaccine is intended to neutralize the COVID‑19 infection, a vaccine may have an unintended opposite effect by causing antibody-dependent disease enhancement (ADE), which increases the virus attachment to its target cells and might trigger a cytokine storm if a vaccinated person is later attacked by the virus. The vaccine technology platform (for example, viral vector vaccine, spike (S) protein vaccine or protein subunit vaccine), vaccine dose, timing of repeat vaccinations for the possible recurrence of COVID‑19 infection, and elderly age are factors determining the risk and extent of ADE. The antibody response to a vaccine is a variable of vaccine technologies in development, including whether the vaccine has precision in its mechanism, and choice of the route for how it is given (intramuscular, intradermal, oral, or nasal).

Prior to the pandemic, ADE was observed in animal studies of laboratory rodents with vaccines for SARS-CoV, the virus that causes severe acute respiratory syndrome (SARS). Researchers therefore emphasized the need to carefully assess the potential for ADE to occur with COVID-19. However, as of 27 January 2022 there have been no observed incidences with vaccines for COVID-19 in trials with nonhuman primates, in clinical trials with humans, or following the widespread use of approved vaccines.

== Trials ==
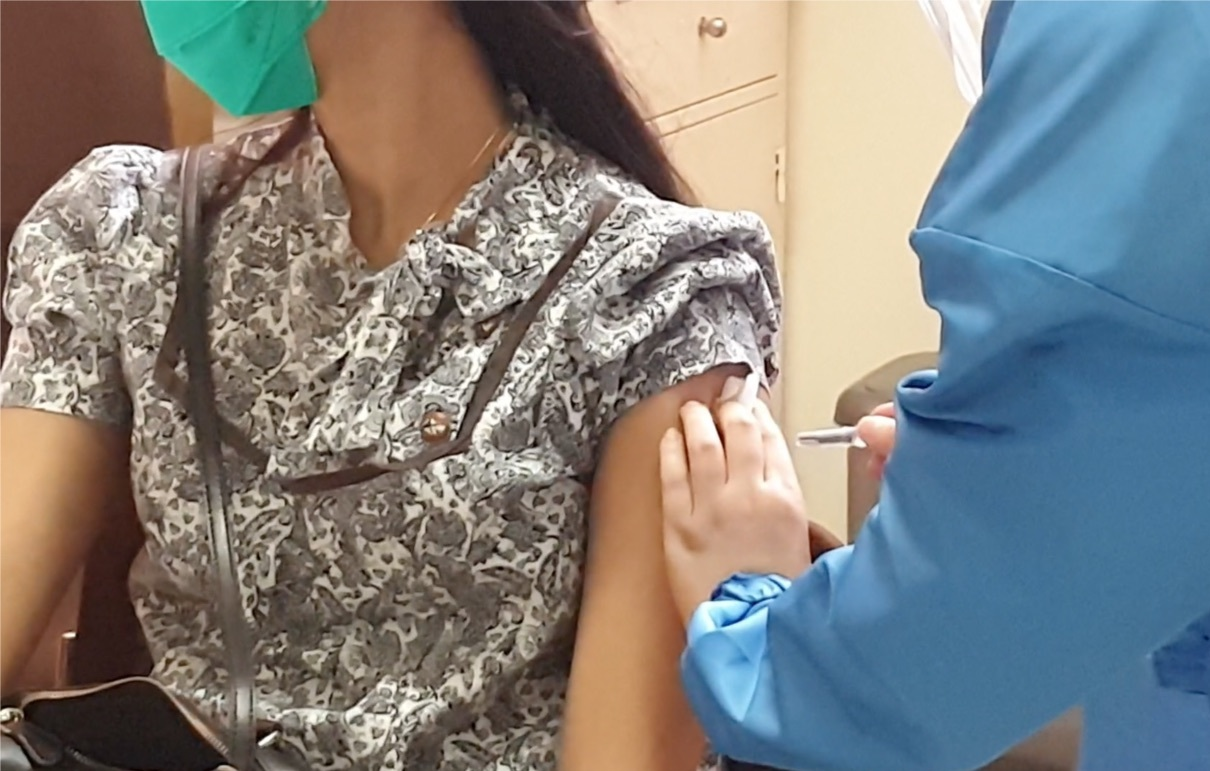
Volunteer receives CoronaVac injection during Phase III trial by Sinovac in Indonesia.

In April 2020, the WHO published an "R&D Blueprint (for the) novel Coronavirus" (Blueprint). The Blueprint documented a "large, international, multi-site, individually randomized controlled clinical trial" to allow "the concurrent evaluation of the benefits and risks of each promising candidate vaccine within 3–6 months of it being made available for the trial." The Blueprint listed a Global Target Product Profile (TPP) for COVID‑19, identifying favorable attributes of safe and effective vaccines under two broad categories: "vaccines for the long-term protection of people at higher risk of COVID‑19, such as healthcare workers", and other vaccines to provide rapid-response immunity for new outbreaks. The international TPP team was formed to 1) assess the development of the most promising candidate vaccines; 2) map candidate vaccines and their clinical trial worldwide, publishing a frequently updated "landscape" of vaccines in development; 3) rapidly evaluate and screen for the most promising candidate vaccines simultaneously before they are tested in humans; and 4) design and coordinate a multiple-site, international randomized controlled trial – the "Solidarity trial" for vaccines – to enable simultaneous evaluation of the benefits and risks of different vaccine candidates under clinical trials in countries where there are high rates of COVID‑19 disease, ensuring fast interpretation and sharing of results around the world. The WHO vaccine coalition will prioritize which vaccines should go into Phase II and III clinical trials, and determine harmonized Phase III protocols for all vaccines achieving the pivotal trial stage.

Phase I trials test primarily for safety and preliminary dosing in a few dozen healthy subjects, while Phase II trials – following success in Phase I – evaluate immunogenicity, dose levels (efficacy based on biomarkers) and adverse effects of the candidate vaccine, typically in hundreds of people. A Phase I–II trial consists of preliminary safety and immunogenicity testing, is typically randomized, placebo-controlled, while determining more precise, effective doses. Phase III trials typically involve more participants at multiple sites, include a control group, and test effectiveness of the vaccine to prevent the disease (an "interventional" or pivotal trial), while monitoring for adverse effects at the optimal dose. Definition of vaccine safety, efficacy, and clinical endpoints in a Phase III trial may vary between the trials of different companies, such as defining the degree of side effects, infection or amount of transmission, and whether the vaccine prevents moderate or severe COVID‑19 infection. Phase III trials of AstraZeneca's intervention started 28 August 2020 and ended 5 March 2021.

In January 2022 'Moderna' and 'Pfizer' both started trials of vaccine tailored to immunize against the Omicron variant.

=== Enrollment of participants ===
Vaccine developers have to invest resources internationally to find enough participants for Phase II–III clinical trials when the virus has proved to be a "moving target" of changing transmission rate across and within countries, forcing companies to compete for trial participants. As an example in June, the Chinese vaccine developer Sinovac formed alliances in Malaysia, Canada, the UK, and Brazil among its plans to recruit trial participants and manufacture enough vaccine doses for a possible Phase III study in Brazil where COVID‑19 transmission was accelerating during June. As the COVID‑19 pandemic within China became more isolated and controlled, Chinese vaccine developers sought international relationships to conduct advanced human studies in several countries, creating competition for trial participants with other manufacturers and the international Solidarity trial organized by the WHO. In addition to competition over recruiting participants, clinical trial organizers may encounter people unwilling to be vaccinated due to vaccine hesitancy or disbelieving the science of the vaccine technology and its ability to prevent infection.

Having an insufficient number of skilled team members to administer vaccinations may hinder clinical trials that must overcome risks for trial failure, such as recruiting participants in rural or low-density geographic regions, and variations of age, race, ethnicity, or underlying medical conditions.

Eligibility criteria for AstraZeneca's Phase III trial included: Ages, 18 to 130 Years, All Sexes, and Healthy Volunteers. Inclusion Criteria specified, Increased risk of SARS-CoV-2 infection and medically stable. Exclusion criteria included; 1) confirmed or suspected immunosuppressive or immunodeficient state, 2) significant disease, disorder, or finding, and 3) Prior or concomitant vaccine therapy for COVID‑19.

=== Adaptive design for the Solidarity trial ===
A clinical trial design in progress may be modified as an "adaptive design" if accumulating data in the trial provide early insights about positive or negative efficacy of the treatment. The WHO Solidarity trial of multiple vaccines in clinical studies during 2020, will apply adaptive design to rapidly alter trial parameters across all study sites as results emerge. Candidate vaccines may be added to the Solidarity trial as they become available if priority criteria are met, while vaccine candidates showing poor evidence of safety or efficacy compared to placebo or other vaccines will be dropped from the international trial.

Adaptive designs within ongoing Phase II–III clinical trials on candidate vaccines may shorten trial durations and use fewer subjects, possibly expediting decisions for early termination or success, avoiding duplication of research efforts, and enhancing coordination of design changes for the Solidarity trial across its international locations.

=== Proposed challenge studies ===
Challenge studies are a type of clinical trial involving the intentional exposure of the test subject to the condition tested, an approach that can significantly accelerate vaccine development. Human challenge studies may be ethically controversial because they involve exposing test subjects to dangers beyond those posed by potential side effects of the substance being tested. Challenge studies have been used for diseases less deadly than COVID‑19 infection, such as common influenza, typhoid fever, cholera, and malaria. The World Health Organization developed a guidance document with criteria for conducting COVID‑19 challenge studies in healthy people, including scientific and ethical evaluation, public consultation and coordination, selection and informed consent of the participants, and monitoring by independent experts. Beginning in January 2021, dozens of young adult volunteers will be deliberately infected with COVID‑19 in a challenge trial conducted in a London hospital under management by the British government COVID‑19 Vaccine Taskforce. Once an infection dose of COVID‑19 is identified, two or more of the candidate COVID‑19 vaccines will be tested for effectiveness in preventing infection.

== Authorizations and licensure ==
At the beginning of the COVID‑19 pandemic in 2020, the WHO issued a guideline as an Emergency Use Listing of new vaccines, a process derived from the 2013–16 Ebola epidemic. It required that a vaccine candidate developed for a life-threatening emergency be manufactured using GMP and that it complete development according to WHO prequalification procedures.

Even as new vaccines are developed during the COVID‑19 pandemic, licensure of COVID‑19 vaccine candidates requires submission of a full dossier of information on development and manufacturing quality. In the UK and the EU, companies may use a "rolling review process", supplying data as they become available during Phase III trials, rather than developing the full documentation over months or years at the end of clinical research, as is typical. This rolling process allows the UK's regulator (MHRA) and the European Committee for Medicinal Products for Human Use to evaluate clinical data in real time, enabling a promising vaccine candidate to be approved on a rapid timeline by both the UK's MHRA and the European Medicines Agency (EMA). A rolling review process for the Moderna vaccine candidate was initiated in October by Health Canada and the EMA, and in November in Canada for the Pfizer-BioNTech candidate.

=== Early authorizations in China and Russia ===
On 24 June 2020, China approved the CanSino vaccine for limited use in the military and two inactivated virus vaccines for emergency use in high-risk occupations. On 11 August 2020, Russia announced the approval of its Sputnik V vaccine for emergency use, though one month later only small amounts of the vaccine had been distributed for use outside of the phase 3 trial. In September, the United Arab Emirates approved emergency use of the Sinopharm BIBP vaccine for healthcare workers, followed by similar emergency use approval from Bahrain in November.

=== First authorizations of RNA vaccines ===
In the United States, an Emergency Use Authorization (EUA) is "a mechanism to facilitate the availability and use of medical countermeasures, including vaccines, during public health emergencies, such as the current COVID‑19 pandemic." Once an EUA is issued by the FDA, the vaccine developer is expected to continue the Phase III clinical trial to finalize safety and efficacy data, leading to application for licensure (approval) in the United States. In mid-2020, concerns that the FDA might grant a vaccine EUA before full evidence from a Phase III clinical trial was available raised broad concerns about the potential for lowered standards in the face of political pressure. On 8 September 2020, nine leading pharmaceutical companies involved in COVID‑19 vaccine research signed a letter, pledging that they would submit their vaccines for emergency use authorization only after Phase III trials had demonstrated safety and efficacy.

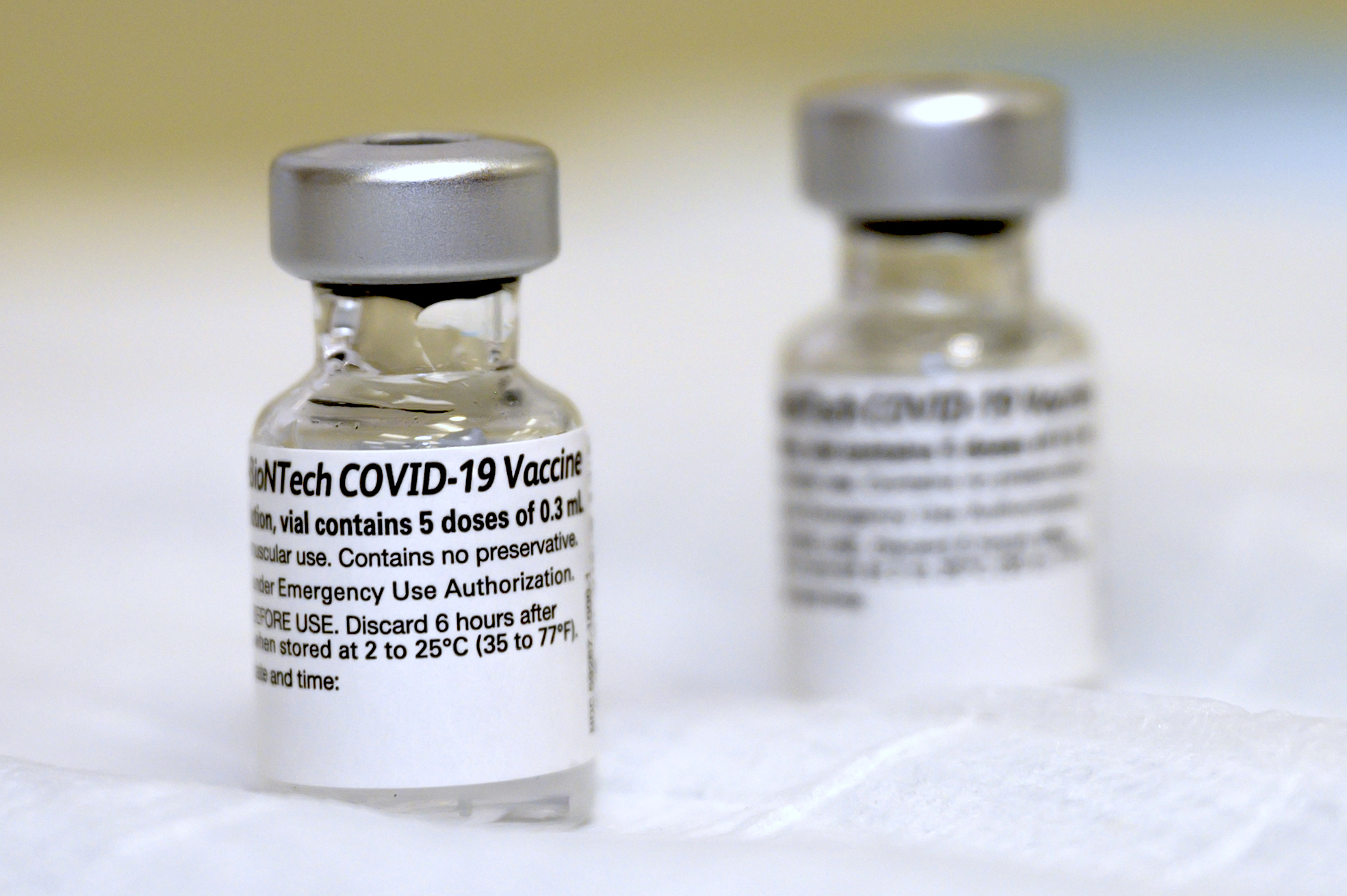
Pfizer-BioNTech COVID-19 vaccine.

The Pfizer-BioNTech partnership submitted an EUA request to the FDA for the mRNA vaccine BNT162b2 (active ingredient tozinameran) on 20 November 2020. On 2 December 2020, the United Kingdom's Medicines and Healthcare products Regulatory Agency (MHRA) gave temporary regulatory approval for the Pfizer–BioNTech vaccine, becoming the first country to approve this vaccine and the first country in the Western world to approve the use of any COVID‑19 vaccine. On 8 December 2020, 90-year-old Margaret Keenan received the vaccine at University Hospital Coventry, becoming the first person known to be vaccinated outside of a trial, as the UK's vaccination programme began. However, other vaccines had been given earlier in Russia. On 11 December 2020, the US Food and Drug Administration (FDA) granted an Emergency Use Authorization (EUA) for the Pfizer-BioNTech vaccine. On 19 December 2020, the Swiss Agency for Therapeutic Products (Swissmedic) approved the Pfizer-BioNTech vaccine for regular use, two months after receiving the application. This was the first authorization by a stringent regulatory authority under a standard procedure for any COVID‑19 vaccine. On 23 December, a 90-year-old Lucerne resident became the first person to receive the vaccine in continental Europe.

As of December 2020, many countries and the European Union have authorized or approved the Pfizer-BioNTech COVID‑19 vaccine. Bahrain and the United Arab Emirates granted emergency marketing authorization for the Sinopharm BIBP vaccine. In the United Kingdom, 138,000 people had received the Pfizer-BioNTech COVID‑19 vaccine Comirnaty by 16 December, during the first week of the UK vaccination programme. On 18 December 2020, the US FDA granted an EUA for mRNA-1273, the Moderna vaccine. Vaccine manufacturers are awaiting full approvals to name their vaccines.

Moderna submitted a request for an EUA for mRNA-1273 to the FDA on 30 November 2020. On 18 December 2020, the FDA granted an EUA for the Moderna vaccine.

=== United Kingdom ===
The UK Medicines and Healthcare products Regulatory Agency (MHRA) gave the first approval to the Oxford/AstraZeneca vaccine on 30 December 2020, as its second vaccine to enter the national rollout under a conditional and temporary authorization to supply.

In November 2021, the full nucleotide sequences of the AstraZeneca and Pfizer/BioNTech vaccines were released by the UK Medicines and Healthcare products Regulatory Agency in response to a freedom of information request.

=== Australia ===
In October 2020, the Australian Therapeutic Goods Administration (TGA) granted provisional determinations to AstraZeneca Pty Ltd in relation to its COVID‑19 vaccine, ChAdOx1-S [recombinant] and to Pfizer Australia Pty Ltd in relation to its COVID‑19 vaccine, BNT162b2 [mRNA]. Janssen Cilag Pty Ltd was granted a provisional determination in relation to its COVID‑19 vaccine, Ad26.COV2.S, in November 2020.

On 24 January 2021, the TGA granted provisional approval to Pfizer Australia Pty Ltd for Comirnaty.

On 24 June 2021, the TGA granted provisional determination to Moderna Australia Pty Ltd for Elasomeran.

=== European Union ===
In October 2020, the Committee for Medicinal Products for Human Use (CHMP) of the European Medicines Agency (EMA) started 'rolling reviews' of the vaccines known as COVID‑19 Vaccine AstraZeneca (ChAdOx1-SARS-CoV-2) and Pfizer-BioNTech COVID‑19 Vaccine (BNT162b2). The EMA released an update on the status of its rolling review of the COVID‑19 Vaccine AstraZeneca in December 2020, after the UK granted a temporary authorization of supply for the vaccine.

In November 2020, the EMA published a safety monitoring plan and guidance on risk management planning (RMP) for COVID‑19 vaccines. The plan outlines how relevant new information emerging after the authorization and uptake of COVID‑19 vaccines in the pandemic situation will be collected and promptly reviewed. All RMPs for COVID‑19 vaccines will be published on the EMA's website. The EMA published guidance for developers of potential COVID‑19 vaccines on the clinical evidence to include in marketing authorization applications.

In November 2020, the CHMP started a rolling review of the Moderna vaccine for COVID‑19 known as mRNA-1273.

In December 2020, the EMA received application for conditional marketing authorizations (CMA) for the mRNA vaccines BNT162b2 and mRNA1273 (Moderna Covid‑19 vaccine). The assessments of the vaccines are scheduled to proceed under accelerated timelines with the possibility of opinions issued within weeks.

In December 2020, the CHMP started a rolling review of the Ad26.COV2.S COVID‑19 vaccine from Janssen-Cilag International N.V.

On 21 December 2020, the CHMP recommended granting a conditional marketing authorization for the Pfizer-BioNTech COVID‑19 vaccine, Comirnaty (active ingredient tozinameran), developed by BioNTech and Pfizer. The recommendation was accepted by the European Commission the same day.

On 6 January 2021, the CHMP recommended granting a conditional marketing authorization for COVID-19 Vaccine Moderna and the recommendation was accepted by the European Commission the same day.

In January 2021, the EMA received an application for conditional marketing authorization (CMA) for the COVID‑19 vaccine known as COVID‑19 Vaccine AstraZeneca, developed by AstraZeneca and Oxford University. On 29 January 2021, the CHMP recommended granting the conditional marketing authorization and the recommendation was accepted by the European Commission the same day.

In February 2021, the CHMP started a rolling review of NVX-CoV2373, a COVID‑19 vaccine being developed by Novavax CZ AS (a subsidiary of Novavax, Inc.) and a rolling review of CVnCoV, a COVID‑19 vaccine being developed by CureVac AG.

In February 2021, the EMA announced that they are developing vaccine guidance to address the virus variants.

In February 2021, the EMA received an application for conditional marketing authorization (CMA) for the COVID-19 Vaccine Janssen developed by Janssen-Cilag International N.V. The EMA recommended a conditional marketing authorization of the COVID-19 Vaccine Janssen on 11 March 2021, and it was accepted by the European Commission the same day.

In March 2021, the CHMP started a rolling review of Sputnik V (Gam-COVID-Vac). The EU applicant is R-Pharm Germany GmbH.

In May 2021, the CMMP started evaluating the use of Comirnaty to include young people aged 12 to 15, and it started a rolling review of Sinovac COVID-19 Vaccine. The EU applicant for Sinovac is Life'On S.r.l.
