= Helen McShane =

British virologist

Helen McShane FRCP
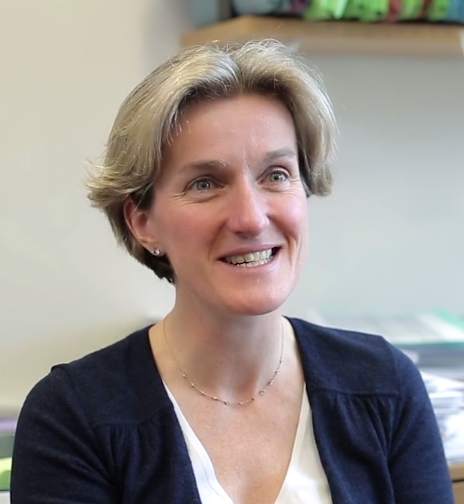
- Born: Helen Irene McShane
- Education: University of London (PhD)
- Scientific career
- Fields: Tuberculosis vaccines Immunology; HIV
- Workplaces: University of Oxford; Jenner Institute
- Thesis: Immunisation strategies for enhancing T cell responses against M. tuberculosis (2002)
- Website: www.ndm.ox.ac.uk/principal-investigators/researcher/helen-mcshane

Helen Irene McShane is a British infectious disease physician and a professor of vaccinology in the Jenner Institute at the University of Oxford, where she has led the tuberculosis vaccine research group since 2001, and is the director of the Oxford NIHR Biomedical Research Centre. She is senior research fellow at Harris Manchester College, Oxford, and the Deputy Head of the Medical Sciences Division, University of Oxford.

== Education ==
Helen McShane first studied at the University of London, where she obtained an intercalated Bachelor of Science degree in psychology in 1988 followed by a Bachelor of Medicine, Bachelor of Surgery (MB BS) in 1991. She was subsequently awarded a Doctor of Philosophy from the University of London in 2002 for research investigating immunisation strategies for enhancing T cell responses against Mycobacterium tuberculosis.

== Career and research ==
After receiving her degree in medicine from the University of London, her first hospital jobs were in Brighton. Whilst working with patients with HIV she became interested in infectious diseases, before moving to Oxford where she was appointed a specialist registrar for infectious diseases. After her PhD in 2002 she received a Wellcome Trust science research fellowship and starting her own tuberculosis vaccine research group there. She was appointed a clinical consultant in 2003. She is an honorary consultant in HIV and genito-urinary medicine at the Oxford University Hospitals.

Since 2002, the Tuberculosis Vaccine Initiative Advisory Committee (TBVI), of which McShane is the chair, has conducted clinical trials of candidate vaccines developed at the Jenner Institute, including MVA85A and ChAdOx1 85A in the United Kingdom, The Gambia, South Africa, Senegal and Uganda. MVA85A is the first TB vaccine candidate in this cohort to be tested for efficacy in humans.

The committee is also currently investigating whether delivering a TB vaccine via the aerosol route (nebulisation directly into the lungs) is a more effective method of vaccination. McShane has authored or co-authored over 100 peer-reviewed publications.

=== Awards and honours ===
In 2019, McShane was named amongst other colleagues as a National Institute for Health Research (NIHR) Senior Investigator, in recognition of her "outstanding contribution to clinical and applied health and social care research". McShane is also a Fellow of the Royal College of Physicians (FRCP) and was elected a Fellow of the Academy of Medical Sciences in 2019.
