= Sarah Gilbert =

English vaccinologist (born 1962)

Dame Sarah Gilbert DBE FRS
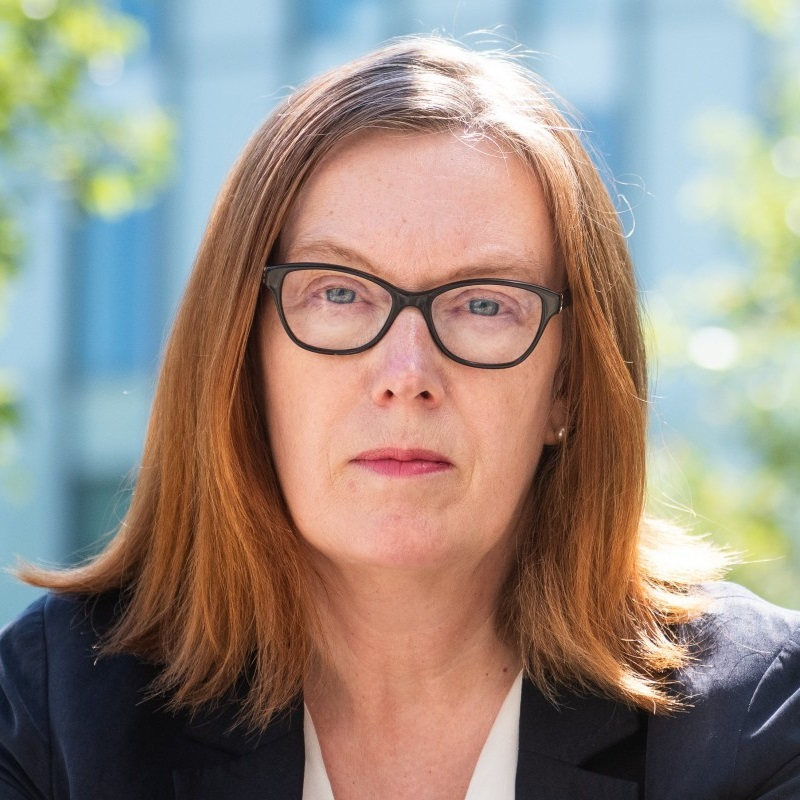
- Gilbert in 2021
- Born: April 1962 (age 64); Kettering, Northamptonshire, England
- Education: University of East Anglia (BSc); University of Hull (PhD)
- Known for: Vaccinology
- Spouse: Rob Blundell
- Children: 3
- Awards: Albert Medal (2021); Princess of Asturias Award (2021); King Faisal Prize (2023)
- Scientific career
- Fields: Vaccines
- Workplaces: University of Oxford; Vaccitech; Delta Biotechnology; Leicester Biocentre; Brewing Industry Research Foundation; Christ Church, Oxford
- Thesis: Studies on lipid accumulation and genetics of Rhodosporidium toruloides (1986)
- Doctoral advisor: Colin Ratledge, Dr M. Keenan
- Website: www.jenner.ac.uk/team/sarah-gilbert

Dame Sarah Catherine Gilbert (born April 1962) is an English vaccinologist who is a Professor of Vaccinology at the University of Oxford and co-founder of Vaccitech. She specialises in the development of vaccines against influenza and emerging viral pathogens. She led the development and testing of the universal flu vaccine, which underwent clinical trials in 2011.

In January 2020, she read a report on ProMED-mail about four people in China suffering from a strange kind of pneumonia of unknown origin in Wuhan. Within two weeks, a vaccine had been designed at Oxford against the new pathogen, which later became known as COVID-19. On 30 December 2020, the Oxford–AstraZeneca COVID-19 vaccine she co-developed with the Oxford Vaccine Group was approved for use in the UK. More than 3 billion doses of the vaccine were supplied to countries worldwide.

== Early life and education ==
Sarah Catherine Gilbert was born in Kettering, Northamptonshire. Her father was an office manager for a shoemakers and her mother was a primary school teacher. Gilbert attended Kettering High School for Girls, where she realised that she wanted to work in medicine. She earned nine O-Levels with six A grades. She graduated with a Bachelor of Science degree in biological sciences from the University of East Anglia (UEA) in 1983. While at UEA she began playing the saxophone, which she would practise in the woods around the UEA Broad so as not to disturb others in her halls.

She moved to the University of Hull for her doctoral degree, where she investigated the genetics and biochemistry of the yeast Rhodosporidium toruloides, graduating with a PhD in 1986.

== Research and career ==
After earning her doctoral degree, Gilbert worked as a postdoctoral researcher in industry at the Brewing Industry Research Foundation before moving to the Leicester Biocentre. In 1990, Gilbert joined Delta Biotechnology, a biopharmaceutical company that manufactured drugs in Nottingham. In 1994, Gilbert returned to academia, joining the laboratory of Adrian V. S. Hill. Her early research considered host–parasite interactions in malaria. She became a University lecturer in 1999 and she was made a Reader in Vaccinology at the University of Oxford in 2004.

She was made Professor at the Jenner Institute in 2010. With the support of the Wellcome Trust, Gilbert started work on the design and creation of novel influenza vaccinations. In particular, her research considers the development and preclinical testing of viral vaccinations, which embed a pathogenic protein inside a safe virus. These viral vaccinations induce a T cell response, which can be used against viral diseases, malaria and cancer.

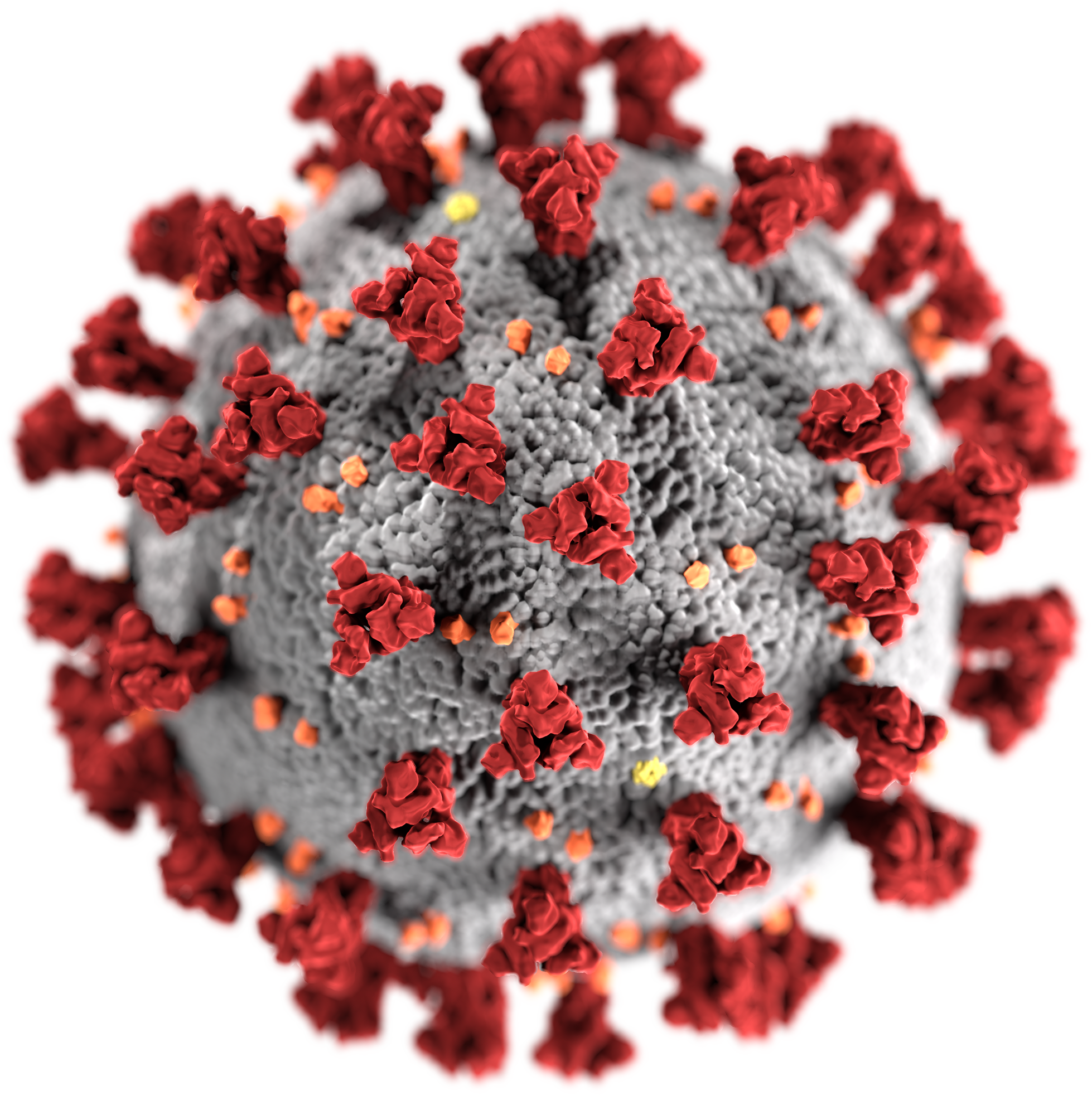
Graphical representation of the Severe Acute Respiratory Syndrome coronavirus 2 (SARS-CoV-2), created by the Centers for Disease Control and Prevention, which reveals ultrastructural morphology exhibited by coronaviruses.

Gilbert was involved with the development and testing of the universal flu vaccine. Unlike conventional vaccinations, the universal flu vaccine did not stimulate the production of antibodies, but instead triggers the immune system to create T cells that are specific for influenza. It makes use of one of the core proteins (nucleoprotein and matrix protein 1) inside the Influenza A virus, not the external proteins that exist on the outside coat.

As the immune system weakens with age, conventional vaccinations are not effective for elderly. The universal flu vaccine does not need to be reformatted every year and stops people from needing a seasonal flu vaccine. Her first clinical trials, which were in 2008, made use of the Influenza A virus subtype H3N2, and included daily monitoring of the patient's symptoms. It was the first study that demonstrated that it was possible to stimulate T cells in response to a flu virus, and that this stimulation would protect people from getting the flu. Her research has demonstrated that the adenoviral vector ChAdOx1 can be used to make vaccinations that are protective against Middle East respiratory syndrome (MERS) in mice and able to induce immune response against MERS in humans. The same vector was also used to create a vaccine against Nipah which was effective in hamsters (but never proven in humans), in addition to a potential vaccine for Rift Valley Fever that was protective in sheep, goats, and cattle (but not proven in humans).

Gilbert has been involved with the development of a new vaccination to protect against coronavirus since the beginning of the COVID-19 pandemic. She leads the work on this vaccine candidate alongside Andrew Pollard, Teresa Lambe, Sandy Douglas, Catherine Green and Adrian Hill. As with her earlier work, the COVID-19 vaccine makes use of an adenoviral vector, which stimulates an immune response against the coronavirus spike protein. Plans were announced to start animal studies in March 2020, and recruitment began of 510 human participants for a phase I/II trial on 27 March.

In April 2020, Gilbert was interviewed about the developments by Andrew Marr on BBC television. That same month, Gilbert was reported as saying that her candidate vaccine could be available by September 2020, if everything goes to plan with the clinical trial, which has received funding from sources such as the Coalition for Epidemic Preparedness Innovations. Gilbert delivered an update in September 2020 that the vaccine, AZD1222, was being produced by AstraZeneca while phase III trials were ongoing. Because of her vaccine research, Gilbert featured on The Times' 'Science Power List' in May 2020.

In 2021, Gilbert and Catherine Green published Vaxxers: the inside story of the Oxford AstraZeneca vaccine and the race against the virus.

== Recognition ==
Gilbert was the subject of BBC Radio 4's The Life Scientific in September 2020. She was also on the list of the BBC's 100 Women announced on 23 November 2020, and became a senior associated research fellow at Christ Church, Oxford. Gilbert was awarded the Rosalind Franklin medal for her services to science by Humanists UK at its annual Rosalind Franklin Lecture on 5 March 2021, at which she delivered a lecture titled 'Racing against the virus'. The lecture detailed the history of the science of vaccination and recounted the progress of the Oxford/AstraZeneca vaccine.

In June 2021, Gilbert received a standing ovation at the 2021 Wimbledon Championships. In 2021, as a role model (Barbie Shero), Sarah Gilbert had a Barbie doll made in her honour by the toy manufacturer Mattel.

== Awards ==
- 2021 – Humanists UK Rosalind Franklin Medal
- 2021 – Albert Medal of the Royal Society of Arts
- 2021 – Dame Commander of the Order of the British Empire (DBE) in the 2021 Birthday Honours for services to science and to public health in COVID-19 vaccine development
- 2021 – Princess of Asturias Award for Technical & Scientific Research
- 2021 – Royal Society of Medicine Gold Medal
- 2021 – Fellow of the Academy of Medical Sciences (FMedSci)
- 2022 – Honorary Doctorate of Science from the University of East Anglia
- 2022 – Honorary Doctorate of Science from the University of Bath
- 2022 - Geoffrey Schild Award
- 2023 – King Faisal Prize in Medicine
- 2023 – Fellow of the Royal Society (FRS)

== Personal life ==
Gilbert gave birth to triplets in 1998. Her husband, Rob Blundell, gave up his career to be their primary parent. As of 2020, all of the triplets were studying biochemistry at university.

== Selected publications ==
Gilbert has an h-index of 105 according to Google Scholar. Her publications include:

- Merryn Voysey; Sue Ann Costa Clemens; Shabir A Madhi; et al. (8 December 2020). "Safety and efficacy of the ChAdOx1 nCoV-19 vaccine (AZD1222) against SARS-CoV-2: an interim analysis of four randomised controlled trials in Brazil, South Africa, and the UK". The Lancet. 397 (10269): 99–111. doi:10.1016/S0140-6736(20)32661-1. ISSN 0140-6736. PMC 7723445. PMID 33306989.
- Schneider J; Sarah Gilbert; Blanchard TJ; et al. (1 April 1998). "Enhanced immunogenicity for CD8+ T cell induction and complete protective efficacy of malaria DNA vaccination by boosting with modified vaccinia virus Ankara". Nature Medicine. 4 (4): 397–402. doi:10.1038/NM0498-397. ISSN 1078-8956. PMID 9546783. S2CID 11413461.
- McShane, H; Pathan, A A; Sander, C R; Keating, S M; Gilbert, S C; Huygen, K; Fletcher, H A; Hill, A V S (December 2004). "Erratum: Recombinant modified vaccinia virus Ankara expressing antigen 85A boosts BCG-primed and naturally acquired antimycobacterial immunity in humans". Nature Medicine. 10 (12): 1397. doi:10.1038/nm1204-1397a. ISSN 1078-8956.
- Samuel J McConkey; William H H Reece; Vasee S Moorthy; et al. (25 May 2003). "Enhanced T-cell immunogenicity of plasmid DNA vaccines boosted by recombinant modified vaccinia virus Ankara in humans". Nature Medicine. 9 (6): 729–735. doi:10.1038/NM881. ISSN 1078-8956. PMID 12766765. S2CID 6670274.
- Sarah Gilbert; Plebanski M; Gupta S; et al. (1 February 1998). "Association of malaria parasite population structure, HLA, and immunological antagonism". Science. 279 (5354): 1173–1177. Bibcode:1998Sci...279.1173G. doi:10.1126/SCIENCE.279.5354.1173. ISSN 0036-8075. PMID 9469800. Closed access icon
- Katie J. Ewer; Tommy Rampling; Tommy Rampling; et al. (28 January 2015). "A Monovalent Chimpanzee Adenovirus Ebola Vaccine Boosted with MVA". The New England Journal of Medicine. 374 (17): 1635–1646. doi:10.1056/NEJMOA1411627. hdl:10044/1/83613. ISSN 0028-4793. PMC 5798586. PMID 25629663.
- Gilbert, Sarah; Green, Catherine (2021). Vaxxers: the inside story of the Oxford AstraZeneca vaccine and the race against the virus. London: Hodder & Stoughton. ISBN 978-1-5293-6985-4.
