= Leah Price =

American literary critic (born 1970)

- Born: Leah Price; October 6, 1970 (age 56)
- Spouse: Nir Eyal (bioethicist)
- Children: 1

Academic background
- Education: Yale University; Girton College, Cambridge University

Academic work
- Institutions: Harvard University, Rutgers University
- Main interests: British novel

Leah Price (born October 6, 1970) is an American literary critic who specializes in the British novel and in the history of the book. She is Henry Rutgers Distinguished Professor in the Department of English at Rutgers University and founding director of the Rutgers Initiative for the Book. She has written essays on old and new media for The New York Times Book Review, London Review of Books, The Paris Review, and The Boston Globe.

== Education and career ==
Price completed her undergraduate studies at Harvard University, graduating summa cum laude in 1991 with an A.B. in Literature. She was elected to Phi Beta Kappa and received a Hoopes Prize for her A.B. thesis.

In 1998, she earned her Ph.D. in Comparative Literature from Yale University. From 1997–2000 Price was a Research Fellow in English Literature at Girton College, Cambridge University.

In 2000 Price was appointed Professor of English and American Literature at Harvard University, where at the age of 31 she became one of the youngest assistant professors ever to be promoted to tenure at Harvard.

In 2019 she was appointed as Henry Rutgers Distinguished Professor in the Department of English at Rutgers University and founding director of the Rutgers Initiative for the Book.

She received the Robert Lowry Patten Award in 2013.

In 2023 she presented the A.S.W. Rosenbach Lectures in Bibliography.

== Selected works ==
- The Anthology and the Rise of the Novel (Cambridge University Press, 2000) ISBN 978-0521782081
- Literary Secretaries/Secretarial Culture with Pamela Thurschwell (Routledge, 2005) ISBN 978-1138378827
- Unpacking My Library: Writers and Their Books (Yale University Press, 2011) ISBN 978-0300170924
- How to Do Things with Books in Victorian Britain (Princeton University Press, 2012) ISBN 978-0691114170
- What We Talk About When We Talks About Books: The History and Future of Reading (Basic Books, 2019) ISBN 978-0465042685

== Personal life ==
Price is married to Rutgers bioethicist Nir M. Eyal, and they have one daughter and live in Princeton, New Jersey.

Price is since 2012 a member of Giving What We Can, a community of people who have pledged to give at least 10% of their income to effective charities.

== See also ==
- History of the Book
- Victorian literature
- Literary theory
- Novel
