= Graham Cooke =

Graham Cooke FRCP, FMedSci
- Born: Hemel Hempstead, Hertfordshire, England
- Education: Watford Boys Grammar School
- Alma mater: St John's College, Cambridge; Worcester College, Oxford; University of KwaZulu-Natal
- Scientific career
- Fields: Infectious diseases
- Institutions: Imperial College London
- Thesis: Host genetic of susceptibility to tuberculosis (2003)

Graham Cooke is a clinician scientist and NIHR Professor of Infectious Diseases at the Wright-Fleming Institute of Imperial College London. He is best known for his work on viral hepatitis, particularly hepatitis C.

== Early life and education ==
Educated at Watford Grammar School for Boys, he studied natural sciences and medicine at University of Cambridge. Later he undertook his doctoral studies with Adrian V. S. Hill at the Wellcome Center for Human Genetics, studying human genetic variation and its role in susceptibility to tuberculosis.

== Research and career ==
After specialist training in London, Cooke was based at the Africa Centre for Health and Population Studies, Mtubatuba (now AHRI) before moving to Imperial College. His work has focused on HIV, tuberculosis and viral hepatitis. In 2016 he led publication of global estimates of viral hepatitis disease burden and has had a prominent role in efforts to raise the profile of viral hepatitis globally, leading the commission on viral hepatitis elimination in 2019. He has run randomised trials in the UK and Vietnam contributing insights into host-virus interactions and treatment outcomes.

=== COVID-19 ===
During the COVID-19 pandemic, Cooke was an investigator on the REACT (Real-time Assessment of Community Transmission) programme, the largest study of consented individuals during the pandemic. The programme made important contributions to government policy and informed decisions on relaxation of national restrictions and vaccine delivery.

With Chris Toumazou, he led the development of the COVIDnudge diagnostic, implemented in the NHS in 2020.

=== Other roles ===
He has advocated for access to affordable medicines. He became a member of the WHO committee for Selection and Use of Essential Medicines in 2015 and chairman in 2019. In 2021, he was appointed non-executive director and Deputy Chair of the Medicines and Healthcare products Regulatory Agency Board (MHRA).

== Honours ==
He is a Fellow of the Royal College of Physicians (2012), National Institute for Health and Care Research (NIHR) Research Professor (2017), Fellow of the Academy of Medical Sciences (2023).
