= MTBVAC =

Tuberculosis vaccine candidate

MTBVAC is a candidate vaccine against tuberculosis in humans currently in clinical trials. It is based on a genetically modified form of the Mycobacterium tuberculosis pathogen isolated from humans. Unlike the BCG vaccine, MTBVAC contains all the antigens present in the strains that infect humans.

== Development and manufacturing ==
The vaccine was constructed at the University of Zaragoza in the laboratory of the Mycobacterial Genetics group, in collaboration with Dr. Brigitte Gicquel of the Pasteur Institute in Paris. Currently, the University of Zaragoza has an industrial partner: the Spanish biotechnology company BIOFABRI, belonging to ZENDAL group, responsible for the industrial and clinical development of MTBVAC, studying its immunity and safety in two Phase IIa trials in newborn babies and adults in South Africa. For the Clinical Development of MTBVAC, the tuberculosis vaccine project enjoys the advice and support of the European TBVI (since 2008) and since 2016, of IAVI for the clinical development in adults and adolescents.

=== Research background ===
Similar to BCG, which was conceived in the early 1900s as an attenuated strain of Mycobacterium bovis that causes tuberculosis (TB) in cows and transmitted to humans mainly through ingestion of unpasteurized milk, the discovery of a gene disabled for MTBVAC attenuation starts with an unusual outbreak of a multidrug-resistant M. bovis killing more than 100 HIV- positive individuals in Spain in the early 1990s. From that outbreak, Professor Carlos Martín Montañés and his group identified the phoP gene as a key player in M. tuberculosis virulence.

== Construction and molecular characterization ==
MTBVAC discovery follows the principles of vaccination as per Luis Pasteur: isolation of the human pathogen, attenuation by rational inactivation of selected genes, protection assays in animal models, and evaluation in humans.

The main advantage of using live vaccines based on rational attenuation of M. tuberculosis (Mtb) is their ability to keep the genetic repertoire encoding immunodominant antigens that are absent in BCG, whereas chromosomal deletions in virulence genes provide assurance for safety and genetic stability. Such vaccines are expected to safely induce more specific and longer lasting immune responses in humans that can provide protection against all forms of the disease. This is the rationale that has been followed in the development of the live-attenuated MTBVAC.

The rational attenuation of MTBVAC was achieved by inactivation of the phoP and fadD26 genes, following the international guidelines to progress live vaccines into clinical development.

PhoP gene encodes the PhoP transcription factor of the PhoP / PhoR two-component system essential for the virulence of Mtb. PhoP was shown to regulate between 2–4% of Mtb genes, most of which are involved in well-known virulence pathways of the tuberculosis bacillus. As a consequence of the phoP inactivation, MTBVAC can produce but is unable to export ESAT-6, which results in virulence attenuation, but yet maintains the epitopes present in this immunogenic protein. Other relevant virulence genes regulated by PhoP are involved in the biosynthesis of polyketide-derived acyltrehaloses (DAT, PAT) and sulfolipids (SL), which are first-line lipid constituents of the cell wall that are thought to play a role in host immune modulation, interfering with the recognition of Mtb by the immune system. Finally, phoP is able to modulate protein secretion, and PhoP inactivation in MTBVAC results in increased secretion of immunogenic proteins such as the Ag85 complex.

The fadD26 gene is the first gene of an operon required for the biosynthesis and export of phthiocerol dimycocerosates (PDIM), the main virulence-associated cell-wall lipids of Mtb. The recent evidence indicates that PDIM are involved in the breaking fagosomal in concert with ESAT-6.

== Preclinical research ==
Rigorous preclinical studies in different animal models relevant to tuberculosis (in mice, guinea pigs and non-human primates) conducted between 2001 and 2011 have shown adequate attenuation, safety and improved immunogenicity and protective efficacy against the exposure to M. Tuberculosis in comparison with BCG, thus fulfilling regulatory WHO guidelines and the Geneva consensus requirements for progressing live mycobacterial vaccines to first-in-human Phase 1 clinical evaluation. A successful trial in rhesus macaques was reported in 2021.

== Clinical trials ==
The safety and immunogenicity of new vaccines need to be determined in a reduced number of healthy volunteers. Phase 1 studies (can be first-in-human) to define the safety of different ascending doses are usually conducted in small groups of no more than 100 volunteers per trial. These are followed by medium-sized Phase 2 trials (can be > 100) to corroborate safety and determine the optimal therapeutic dose (detailed immunogenicity profile in the case of new vaccines) that helps select the final dose for Phase 3 efficacy evaluation.

The MTBVAC clinical development started with a first-in-human study in healthy adult volunteers in Lausanne, Switzerland (NCT02013245); followed by one additional Phase 1 study in healthy newborns in South Africa in collaboration with South African TuBerculosis Vaccine Initiative (SATVI) (NCT02729571) to corroborate the safety and greater immunogenic potential of MTBVAC in this age-group relative to BCG. Two dose-defining Phase 2 studies were conducted at SATVI covering adults with and without previous exposure to M. tuberculosis (NCT02933281) (ended in Sep 2021) and healthy newborns (NCT03536117) that was finalized in March 2022.

A Phase 3 study (NCT02933281) with newborns in sub-Saharan Africa had started in October 2022. The estimated study completion date will be February 2029.
