= Tuberculosis vaccines =

Vaccines to prevent tuberculosis

- Drug class

Legal status

Tuberculosis (TB) vaccines are vaccinations intended for the prevention of tuberculosis. Immunotherapy as a defence against TB was first proposed in 1890 by Robert Koch. As of 2026, the only effective tuberculosis vaccine in common use is the Bacillus Calmette-Guérin (BCG) vaccine, first used on humans in 1921. It consists of attenuated (weakened) strains of the cattle tuberculosis bacillus. It is recommended for babies in countries where tuberculosis is common.

About three out of every 10,000 people who get the vaccine experience side effects, which are usually minor except in severely immuno-depressed individuals. While BCG immunization provides fairly effective protection for infants and young children (including defence against TB meningitis and miliary TB), its efficacy in adults is variable, ranging from 0% to 80%. Several variables have been considered as responsible for the varying outcomes. Demand for TB immunotherapy advancement exists because the disease has become increasingly drug-resistant. WHO has designated the development of alternative vaccines against TB as a priority, with goals of reducing TB mortality by 95% and incidents by 90% by 2035. The TB vaccine accelerator council was launched by WHO in 2023, with aims of increasing efforts around TB vaccine development.

Other tuberculosis vaccines are at various stages of development, including:

- MVA85A, a viral vector vaccine that uses an MVA virus engineered to express a tuberculosis bacillus antigen in host cells. Human and animal trials were disappointing and development ceased.
- rBCG30 is a version of the BCG vaccine engineered to express a higher amount of a certain antigen. It showed promise in animal tests in 2003 and phase I human trials in 2008. However development was discontinued because of safety issues.
- MTBVAC, an attenuated form of Myobacterium tuberculosis. Phase II trials were completed in 2021 and 2022; phase III trials began in 2022 and will run until 2029.
- M72/AS01E, consisting of two fused tuberculosis bacillus protein antigens together with the adjuvant AS01. Promising phase II trials were completed in 2018 and phase III trials are currently ongoing (2024-2029).
- GamTBVak, A subunit recombinant anti-tuberculosis vaccine for the prevention of pulmonary tuberculosis in adults, which is at the stage of clinical research. It contains Ag85A and ESAT-6-CFP-10 antigens in combination with an adjuvant. Developed by the N. F. Gamalei National Research Center for Epidemiology and Microbiology. As of May 2022, phase III clinical trials are underway, data on phase I/II studies are also published in the ClinicalTrials database. A phase I clinical trial on 12 volunteers confirmed the safety and immunological efficacy of the vaccine.

New vaccines are being developed by the Tuberculosis Vaccine Initiative (TBVI).

== Vaccine development ==
To promote successful and lasting management of the TB epidemic, effective vaccination is required. Although the World Health Organization (WHO) endorses a single dose of BCG, revaccination with BCG has been standardized in most, but not all countries. However, improved efficacy of multiple dosages has yet to be demonstrated.

Vaccine development is proceeding along several paths:

- Development of a new prime vaccine to replace BCG
- Development of sub-unit or booster vaccines to supplement BCG
  - Pre-infection
  - Booster to BCG
  - Post-infection
  - Therapeutic vaccine
- Development of more effective routes of administration for BCG

Since the BCG vaccine does not offer complete protection against TB, vaccines have been designed to bolster BCG's effectiveness. The industry has now transitioned from developing new alternatives, to selecting the best options currently available to advance into clinical testing. MVA85A was characterized as the "most advanced 'boost' candidate" in 2007. It has since fallen short of its goals.

=== Delivery alternatives ===
BCG is currently administered intradermally. To improve efficacy, research approaches have been directed at modifying the delivery method of vaccinations. For example, BCG has much higher protection rates with intravenous injection in monkeys, though some safety questions must be answered before it can be tested on humans.

Patients can receive MVA85A intradermally or as an oral aerosol. This particular combination proved to be protective against mycobacterial invasion in animals, and both modes are well tolerated. The design incentive behind aerosol delivery is to target the lungs rapidly, easily and painlessly in contrast to intradermal immunization. In murine studies, intradermal vaccination caused localized inflammation at the site of injection whereas MVA85A did not cause unfavourable effects. A correlation has been found between the mode of delivery and vaccine protection efficacy. Research data suggests aerosol delivery has not only physiological and economic advantages, but also the potential to supplement systemic vaccination.

=== Obstacles in development ===
Treatment and prevention of TB has been delayed compared to the resources and research efforts put into other diseases. Large pharmaceutical companies do not see profitable investment because of TB's association with the developing world.

Progression of vaccine designs relies heavily on outcomes in animal models. Appropriate animal models are scarce because it is difficult to imitate TB in non-human species. It is also challenging finding a species to test on a large scale. Most animal testing for TB vaccines has been conducted on murine, bovine and non-primate species. A 2013 study deemed zebrafish a potentially suitable model organism for preclinical vaccine development.

== In veterinary medicine ==
Bovine tuberculosis (M. bovis) affects cattle, causing great economic damage. BCG is known to be effective for prevention, but its use is hindered in countries with an existing bovine TB control network by causing false positives on the tuberculin test. A test that differentiates between the antibody responses from BCG and actual infection is being validated in the UK. BCG is expected to be approved after the new test is put in use.
