= Colin Ratledge =

British biochemist

- Born: 9 October 1936 (age 89)
- Education: University of Manchester
- Scientific career
- Fields: Biochemistry
- Workplaces: University of Hull
- Doctoral students: Sarah Gilbert

Colin Ratledge FRSC FRSB (born 9 October 1936) is a British biochemist who was Professor of Microbial Biochemistry at the University of Hull from 1983 to 2004.

He was educated at Bury High School, and graduated from University of Manchester with a BSc in 1957 and a PhD in 1962. He joined the University of Hull as a lecturer in 1967 and was head of the Department of Biochemistry there from 1986 to 1988.

He was editor of Biotechnology Letters from 1996 to 2017. He received the Stephen Chang Award from the American Oil Chemists' Society in 2011. In 2015 the Colin Ratledge Center for Microbial Lipids opened at Shandong University of Technology. He was awarded an honorary doctorate from Ben-Gurion University of the Negev in 2018.

He has an h-index of 58 according to Semantic Scholar.
