= Nir Eyal (bioethicist) =

Israeli bioethicist (born 1970)

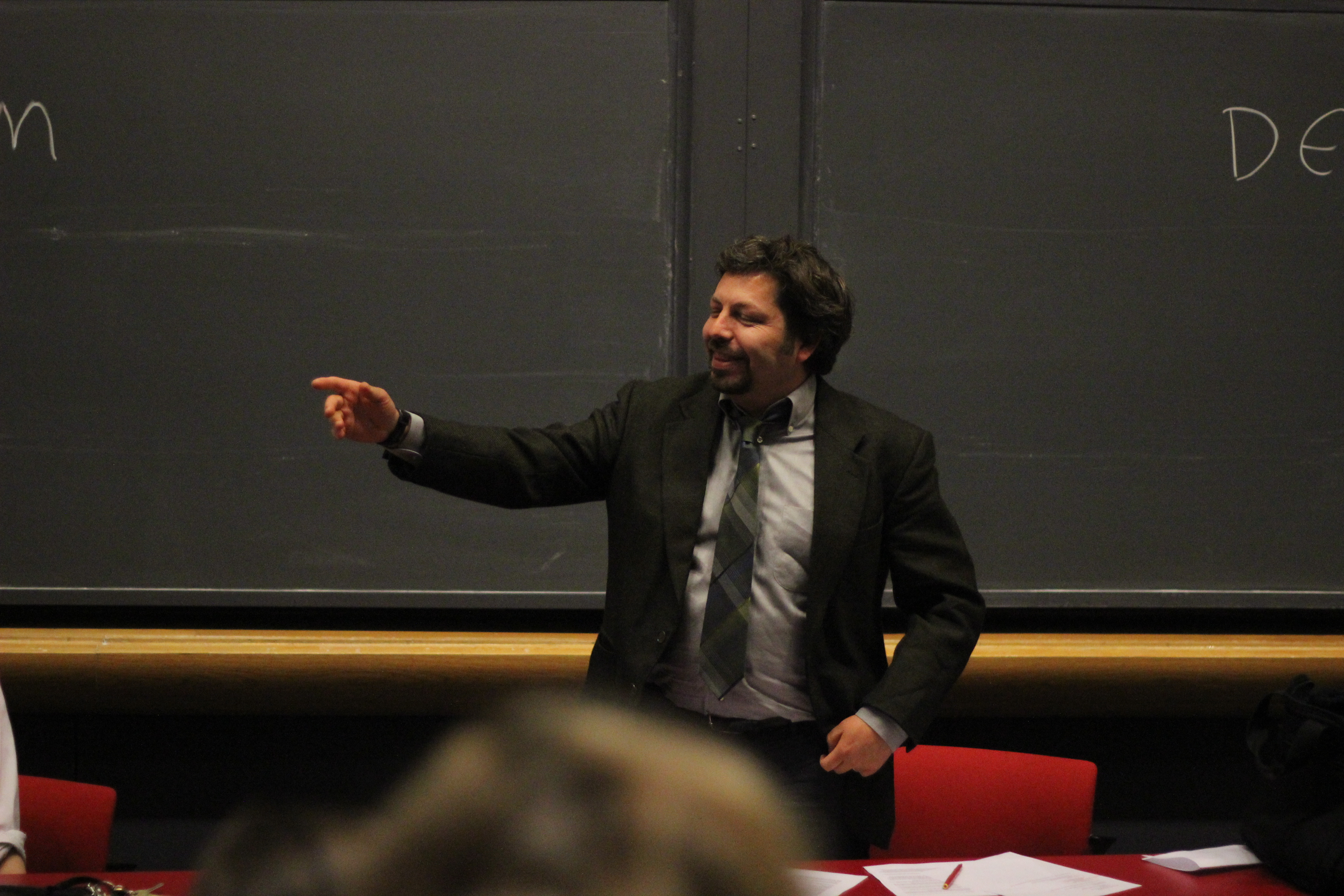
- Eyal in 2015
- Born: Nir Morechay Eyal; June 1970 (age 56); Israel
- Spouse: Leah Price

Academic background
- Education: Oxford University, DPhil Hebrew University, MA
- Alma mater: Tel Aviv University, BA
- Influences: Dan Wikler

Academic work
- Institutions: Rutgers University, Harvard University
- Main interests: Political philosophy Social liberalism; Justice; Politics; Public health; Medical ethics; global health; population health; health ethics
- Notable ideas: human challenge study

Nir Eyal (born June 1970) is a bioethicist and Henry Rutgers Professor of Bioethics and Director of the Center for Population–Level Bioethics at Rutgers University in New Jersey. He was formerly a bioethicist in the Department of Global Health and Population of the Harvard T.H. Chan School of Public Health and the Department of Global Health and Social Medicine of the Harvard Medical School. He has long worked closely with Harvard bioethicist Daniel Wikler. Eyal's current visibility concerns his role in studying the ethics of human challenge trials in HIV, malaria, and coronavirus vaccine development. He has also written on 'bystander risks' during pandemics and infectious diseases and contract tracing during ebola.

== Career ==
Eyal received his early education at Tel Aviv University and Hebrew University in Israel and the DPhil in Politics from Oxford University. He worked with Peter Singer and others during his 2004-2006 post-doctoral study at Princeton University in the NIH Department of Clinical Bioethics and the Princeton University Center for Human Values. He researched and taught from through 2019 in the Department of Global Health and Social Medicine of the Harvard Medical School and in the Department of Global Health and Population of the Harvard T.H. Chan School of Public Health. During those thirteen years, he was affiliated with Faculties of the Harvard Law School and Harvard Faculty of Arts and Sciences and their research centers. In 2009–2010, he was a Faculty Fellow in a visitorship at the Edmond J. Safra Center for Ethics in Cambridge.

Since mid-2019, Eyal has been a faculty member within the Rutgers Department of Philosophy and Director of the Center for Population–Level Bioethics there.

== Education and postdoctoral training ==
- 2004–2006 Harold T Shapiro Postdoctoral Fellowship in Bioethics, Princeton University Center for Human Values
- 2002–2004 Postdoctoral Fellow, National Institutes of Health, Department of Clinical Bioethics
- 1998–2003 DPhil, Politics (political philosophy), Oxford University
- 1994–1998 MA, Philosophy, Hebrew University
- 1991–1994 BA, Philosophy and History, Tel Aviv University

== Awards ==
- Lady Davis Fellowship – Hebrew University of Jerusalem (2018)
- Nominated for Donald O’Hara Faculty Prize for Excellence in Teaching – Harvard Medical School (2014)
- Rector Award – Roskilde University (2013)
- Academics Stand Against Poverty (ASAP) Award – Yale University (2011)
- Mark S. Ehrenreich Prize in Healthcare Ethics Research – International Association of Bioethics and USC (2010) – For best paper in the International Association of Bioethics Congress, with coauthor Neema Sofaer.
- Young Scholar Award, Ethics and Public Life Program – Cornell University (2006)

== Select publications ==
- Eyal N, Lipsitch M. How to Test Severe Acute Respiratory Syndrome Coronavirus 2 Vaccines Ethically Even After One Is Available, Clinical Infectious Diseases, ciab182, 26 February 2021. https://doi.org/10.1093/cid/ciab182. Accessed May 13, 2021.
- Steel R, Buchak L, Eyal N. Why continuing uncertainties are no reason to postpone challenge trials for coronavirus vaccines. Journal of Medical Ethics. 2020. DOI 10.1136/medethics-2020-106501.
- Eyal N, Halkitis PN. AIDS Activism and Coronavirus Vaccine Challenge Trials. AIDS and Behavior, 2020.
- Eyal N, Lipsitch M, Smith PG. Human challenge studies to accelerate coronavirus vaccine licensure. J Infect Dis. 2020;221:1752.
- Eyal N. The benefit/risk ratio challenge in clinical research, and the case of HIV cure: an introduction. J Med Ethics. 2017;43:65–6.
- Eyal N. How to keep high-risk studies ethical: classifying candidate solutions. J Med Ethics. 2017;43:74–7.
- Eyal N. Why Challenge Trials of SARS‐CoV‐2 Vaccines Could Be Ethical Despite Risk of Severe Adverse Events. Ethics & Human Research. 2020.
- Eyal N, Lipsitch M, Smith PG. Human challenge studies to accelerate coronavirus vaccine licensure. 2020. The Journal of infectious diseases 221 (11), 1752–1756.
- Brown MJ, Goodwin J, Liddell K, Martin S, Palmer S, Firth P, N Eyal, ... Allocating Medical Resources in the Time of COVID-19. The New England journal of medicine 2020:382
- Eyal N, Lipsitch M. Ethical Comparators in Coronavirus Vaccine Trials.
- Eyal N, Hurst SA, Murray CJL, Wikler D, Schroeder SA. Measuring the Global Burden of Disease: Philosophical Dimensions. Oxford University Press, USA. 2020.
- Eyal N, Wikler D. Ethical complexities of responding to bystander risk in HIV prevention trials. Clinical Trials 2020:16(5), 458–460.
  - Google Scholar list of publications by Nir Eyal

== Personal life ==
Eyal is married to literary critic Leah Price. They have one son and live in Princeton, New Jersey.

Eyal is a member of Giving What We Can, a community of people who have pledged to give at least 10% of their income to effective charities.

== See also ==
- Bat-borne virus
- Effective altruism
- Human challenge study
- Informed consent
- Risk–benefit ratio
- Zoonosis
