= Jenner Institute =

Vaccine research institute in Oxford

The Jenner Institute
- Parent institution: University of Oxford
- Established: November 2005; 20 years ago
- Director: Adrian Hill
- Staff: 100
- Key people: Sarah Gilbert; Helen McShane
- Formerly called: Edward Jenner Institute for Vaccine Research
- Address: Old Road Campus Research Building (ORCRB), Roosevelt Drive, Oxford OX3 7DQ, UK
- Location: Old Road Campus Research Building, Oxford, United Kingdom
- Coordinates: 51.7519293°N 1.2163045°W
- Interactive map of The Jenner Institute
- Website: www.jenner.ac.uk

The Jenner Institute is a research institute on the Old Road Campus in Headington, east Oxford, England. It was formed in November 2005 through a partnership between the University of Oxford and the UK Institute for Animal Health. It is associated with the Nuffield Department of Medicine, in the Medical Sciences Division of Oxford University. The institute receives charitable support from the Jenner Vaccine Foundation.

The institute is led by Prof. Adrian Hill. The institute develops vaccines and carries out clinical trials for diseases including malaria, tuberculosis (vaccine MVA85A), ebola, and MERS-Coronavirus.

== COVID-19 ==
In 2020, the institute successfully developed the Oxford–AstraZeneca COVID-19 vaccine, in a project backed by private companies including Oxford Sciences Innovation, Google Ventures, and Sequoia Capital, among others. When developed, the UK government backed trials, purchased 100 million doses, and encouraged Oxford to work with AstraZeneca, a company based in Europe, instead of Merck & Co., a US-based company; while the US gave US$1.2bn of government funding in return for 300 million doses.

It collaborated with Italy's Advent Srl (part of the IRBM Group) on the development and Germany's Merck Group on the manufacture of the COVID-19 vaccine. Vaccinologist Dame Sarah Gilbert was one of the leading scientists involved in the development.

The institute is named after the English physician and immunization pioneer Edward Jenner (1749–1823), who was a major contributor to the development of the smallpox vaccine.

== History ==
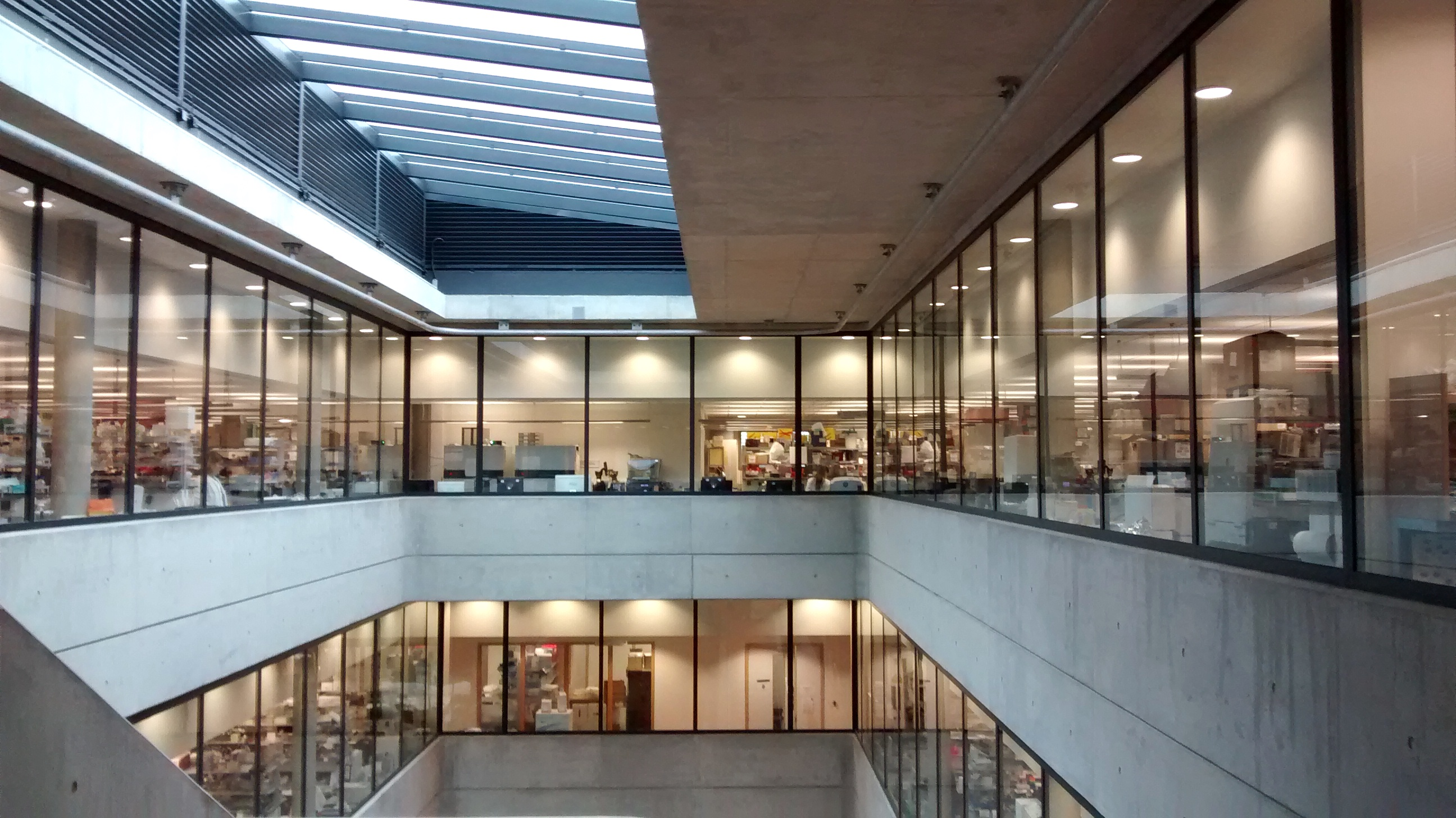
The Jenner Institute Laboratories from the atrium of the Old Road Campus Research Building.

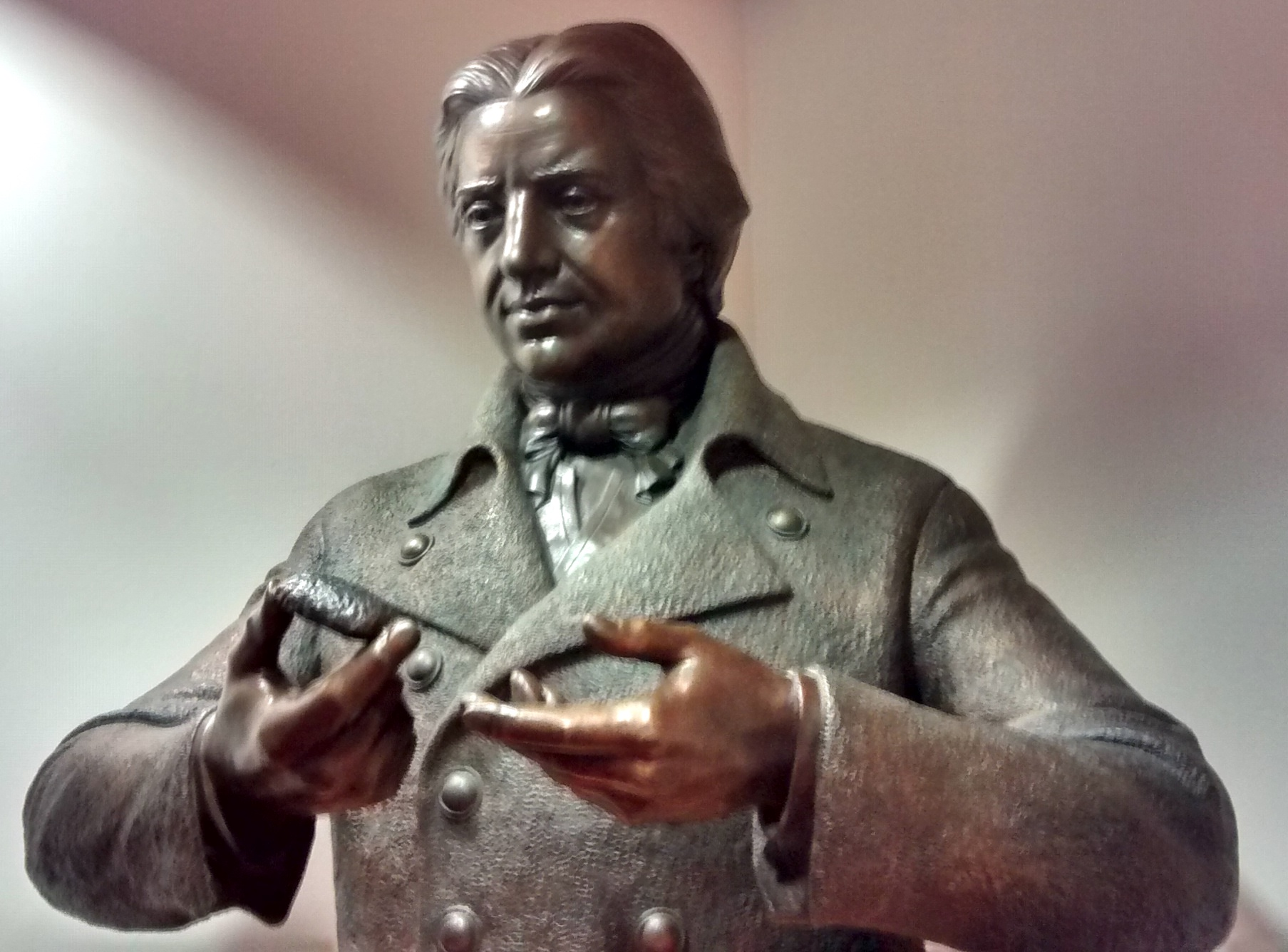
Statue of Edward Jenner at the entrance of The Jenner Institute.

Previously, the Edward Jenner Institute for Vaccine Research was an independent research institute named after Edward Jenner, the inventor of vaccination. It was co-located with the Compton Laboratory of the Institute for Animal Health on a campus in the village of Compton in Berkshire. After occupying temporary laboratory space at the Institute for Animal Health from 1996, the institute moved to a newly completed laboratory building in 1998.

=== Funding ===
Funding of the institute continued until October 2005, when it was relaunched replacing the four founding funding partners (GlaxoSmithKline, the Medical Research Council, the Biotechnology and Biological Sciences Research Council and the Department of Health) with the University of Oxford and the Institute for Animal Health.
