= Adrian V. S. Hill =

Irish vaccinologist (born 1958)

Sir Adrian Hill KBE FRS FMedSci FRCP
- Born: Dublin, County Dublin, Ireland
- Education: Belvedere College
- Alma mater: Trinity College Dublin; University of Oxford
- Known for: Vaccinology
- Spouses: Sunetra Gupta (m. 1994; div. 2020); Sabina Murray (m. 2021)
- Scientific career
- Fields: Genetics; Immunology; Vaccines; Malaria
- Workplaces: Jenner Institute; University of Oxford; Barinthus Biotherapeutics
- Thesis: The distribution and molecular basis of thalassaemia in Oceania (1986)
- Doctoral advisor: John Brian Clegg; David Weatherall
- Website: www.ox.ac.uk/news-and-events/find-an-expert/professor-adrian-hill

Sir Adrian Vivian Sinton Hill is an Irish-British vaccinologist who is Director of the Jenner Institute and Lakshmi Mittal and Family Professor of Vaccinology at the University of Oxford, an honorary Consultant Physician in Infectious Diseases, and Fellow of Magdalen College, Oxford. Hill is a leader in the field of malaria vaccine development and was a co-leader of the research team which produced the Oxford–AstraZeneca COVID-19 vaccine, along with Professor Sarah Gilbert of the Jenner Institute and Professor Andrew Pollard of the Oxford Vaccine Group.

== Early life and education ==
Hill was educated at Belvedere College in Dublin. He began reading medicine at Trinity College Dublin, where he was elected a Foundation Scholar in 1978. Thereupon he transferred to Magdalen College, Oxford for one year, but he ended up remaining in Oxford to complete the rest of his medical degree, qualifying in 1982. He remained at the University of Oxford for postgraduate studies and was awarded a Doctor of Philosophy degree in 1986 for research on the molecular genetics of thalassemia supervised by John B. Clegg.

== Career and research ==
During his time at the Wellcome Trust Centre for Human Genetics his research group studied genetic susceptibility to infections such as malaria, tuberculosis, and HIV. From 1997 he has developed candidate vaccines for malaria which produce cellular (T-cell) immunity and partial efficacy using Adenovirus and Modified vaccinia Ankara (MVA) viral vector vaccines in a prime-boost regime. From 2005 he has played a leading role in the pre-clinical and clinical assessment of new chimpanzee adenoviral vaccine vectors, particularly ChAd63, ChAd3 and ChAdOx1.

His group has developed numerous candidate vaccines against malaria which have been tested in clinical trials in the UK and Africa. In 2021 his group reported high efficacy of a new R21/matrix-M candidate vaccine in Burkina Faso children and this vaccine was licensed in 2024 following a phase III licensure trial. In 2014, he led a clinical trial of an Ebola vaccine based on chimpanzee adenoviral and MVA vector technology in response to the West African Ebola virus epidemic. In 2016 he co-founded Vaccitech plc, an Oxford University spin-off company developing therapeutic and preventive vaccines based on viral vector technology. In 2017 he led a successful major award application to Innovate UK to co-found the Vaccines Manufacturing and Innovation Centre (VMIC) in Harwell, Oxfordshire, one of the first purpose-built vaccine manufacturing centres for emergency response vaccines. In response to the 2020 COVID-19 pandemic he worked with many others at Oxford to develop and partner the ChAdOx1 vector-based SARS-CoV-2 vaccine, notably with AstraZeneca and the Serum Institute of India, supporting large scale access for low and middle income countries. Hill also signed a letter organized by 1Day Sooner to advocate for human challenge trials in the United States.

=== Honours and awards ===
- 1999 Elected a Fellow of the Royal College of Physicians (FRCP)
- 1999 Elected a Fellow of the Academy of Medical Sciences (FMedSci)
- 2005 Appointed to a Fellowship by Special Election at Magdalen College, Oxford
- 2005 Founded the Jenner Institute at Oxford University and appointed institute Director
- 2008 Elected an Honorary Fellow of Trinity College Dublin (Hon. FTCD)
- 2020 Appointed to an ad hominen Lakshmi Mittal and Family Professorship of Vaccinology at Oxford University
- 2021 Elected a Fellow of the Royal Society (FRS)
- 2021 Appointed an Honorary Knight Commander of the Order of the British Empire (KBE) in the 2021 Birthday Honours. Made substantive in 2023, which means he can use both the title of 'Sir' and 'KBE'. Prior to this, only the postnominal letters were allowed to be used.

== Personal life ==
Hill has two children with his former wife, epidemiologist Sunetra Gupta.

In 2021, he married Sabina Murray.
