= Pivotal trial =

Type of clinical research trial

A pivotal trial, or pivotal study, is typically a Phase III clinical trial in the multi-year process of clinical research intended to demonstrate and confirm the safety and efficacy of a treatment – such as a drug candidate, medical device or clinical diagnostic procedure – and to estimate the incidence of common adverse effects. A successful pivotal trial is required as evidence for drug marketing approval by the relevant approval authorities, such as the European Medicines Agency, Health Canada or United States Food and Drug Administration (FDA).

In drug research, a pivotal Phase III trial may be referred to as a "therapeutic confirmatory study", and is conducted in a large number (hundreds to thousands) of subjects. Such pivotal trials are also designed to discover and estimate the prevalence of common adverse events, but based on their size only have the statistical power to establish an adverse effect rate of not less than 1 in 100 subjects. In an analysis of pivotal trials on medical devices conducted between 2006 and 2013, the median duration was three years, with another two years needed for FDA review and approval for marketing.

In 2017 in the United States, the median cost of a pivotal trial across all clinical indications was US$19 million. The cost of a pivotal trial increased when more subjects were added to clarify a treatment effect, when active drug comparators were used to improve understanding of the trial drug characteristics, or when specific clinical endpoints were measured rather than using surrogate outcomes.
