= MVA85A =

Experimental tuberculosis vaccine

MVA85A (modified vaccinia Ankara 85A) was a candidate vaccine against tuberculosis developed by researchers led by Professor Helen McShane at Oxford University. It is a viral vector vaccine and consists of an MVA virus engineered to express the 85A antigen once it infects a host cell. 85A is a cell-wall protein of the tuberculosis bacillus.

This vaccine was believed to produce higher levels of long-lasting cellular immunity when used together with the older TB vaccine BCG. Phase I clinical trials were completed in 2008 and then phase II clinical trials took place in South Africa. A number of efficacy trials ran in parallel from 2009 to 2019. Results released in February 2013 were described as "disappointing", showing only a statistically insignificant prevention rate in infants. A summary of animal studies published in 2015 cast doubt on the efficacy of the vaccine.

In 2018, a BMJ investigation raised concerns about the ethics of an efficacy trial in South African infants, particularly because of results from earlier animal trials such as a study with macaques at Porton Down. One response argued that 14 prior human trials showed a safety signal, that regulators were aware of the primate trial and decided to continue, and that three subsequent investigations found no evidence of wrong-doing. Another response by Ian Orme questioned the critique of animal models.

A Cochrane review in 2019 concluded that MVA85A is safe, however it is not effective in preventing TB infection either on its own or in combination with BCG.
