= Waitlist Zero =

U.S. nonprofit organization

Waitlist Zero is an advocacy group dedicated to promoting living kidney transplantation. Waitlist Zero launched in September 2014, when it obtained its 501(c), with Josh Morrison and Thomas Kelly as co-founders and current executive directors, along with Stephen Rice as its project director.

== Programs ==
=== Policy and donor advocacy ===
Waitlist Zero's primary goal is the support of policies which expand kidney donation with both federal and state campaigns.

At a federal level, Waitlist Zero coalition with the Health Resources and Services Administration (HRSA) in 2015 aims to allow and allocate grants directed to rise living kidney donation, and to implement system-level changes at hospitals regarding donation practices.

State-level (mainly in New York) proposed legislations include covering the financial costs of the operation and guaranteeing donor health insurance.

=== Public awareness and transplant education ===
Non-directed donor education initiatives have also been set in motion, in order to raise awareness about kidney donation, increase the attractiveness of non-directed donations, debunk common misconceptions about living organ transplantation and mobilize donors as constituency group for the organisation.

In January 2015, a social media strategy has also been implemented via Facebook posts, Twitter hashtags and a petition on Change.org asking support from the HRSA.

- To increase the donor-candidate lack of education.
- To spread its benefits and to debunk common misconceptions about living organ donation.

== Funding ==
Waitlist Zero received its major funding in September 2014 of $50,000 as a planning grant, and a year later, in August 2015, $200,000, for general support. Both were granted by the Open Philanthropy Project. They also had received grants from fundraising events and a private donation by Novartis of $35,000.

While a total of $135,000 is expected to be received by the end of 2016, fundraising has since been deprioritized by the board in order to focus on its main goals and values.

== Partners ==
Waitlist Zero is part of the Coalition to Promote Living Kidney Donation, a group made of fourteen other non-profit organisations advocating for policies to expand living organ donation.
