= RBCG30 =

Prospective tuberculosis vaccine

rBCG30 (recombinant Bacillus Calmette–Guérin 30) is a prospective Bacillus Calmette–Guérin vaccine against tuberculosis. It is a live vaccine, consisting of BCG, which has been evaluated as a tuberculosis vaccination. It is genetically modified to produce abundant amounts of mycolyl transferase, a 30kDa antigen (Antigen 85B) that has been shown to produce a strong immune response in animals and humans. rBCG30 had been in human clinical trials, but no clinical development has been reported since 2007.

== History ==
Trials with rBCG30 were halted as the vaccine contained an antibiotic resistance gene. A new version of the vaccine without the antibiotic resistance marker was created. This new version of the vaccine, rBCG30-ARMF-II, often called rBCG30, also expresses 2.6 fold more Ag85B than the original vaccine.

== Research ==
The vaccine completed a Phase I double-blind randomized controlled clinical trial that demonstrated that rBCG30 was safe and immunogenic; during nine months of follow-up, rBCG30, but not BCG, induced significantly increased Antigen 85B-specific immune responses in eight immunological assays (blood lymphocyte proliferation, antibody responses by ELISA, interferon-gamma producing CD4+ and CD8+ T cells ex vivo, central memory CD4+ and CD8+ T cells, interferon-gamma ELISPOT responses, and the capacity of T cells to activate macrophages to inhibit mycobacterial intracellular multiplication). An additional animal study found that rBCG30 also helps protect against Mycobacterium leprae, the bacteria that causes leprosy. Disrupting IL10/STAT3 signaling during vaccination through small molecules enhances vaccination efficacy.
