= Katie Ewer =

British immunologist

Academic background
- Education: PhD, Immunology, 2004, Open University
- Thesis: Relationships between tuberculosis exposure, ex vivo antigen-specific T cell responses, and delayed type hypersensitivity in point-source outbreaks. (2004)

Katie Jane Ewer is a British immunologist and Professor of Vaccine Immunology at the University of Oxford's Jenner Institute.

== Early life and education ==
When she did not get into medical school, Ewer pursued a career in biomedical science and became interested in infectious diseases. She was interested in a career in biology for she was "fascinated by seemingly endless processes that occur in our cells and organs every second of our lives without us knowing about it. Ewer earned an undergraduate degree in biomedical science, which included a year of microbiology training. She then began working as a biomedical scientist at the microbiology department of the John Radcliffe Hospital in 2000, before pursuing a PhD on the immunology of tuberculosis (TB). Ewer earned her PhD at the Open University as a result of her research with Ajit Lalvani on novel diagnostic tools using T cells for the diagnosis of tuberculosis infection.

== Career ==
Upon earning her PhD, Ewer joined the UK's Animal and Plant Health Agency where she studied the effectiveness of TB vaccines in cattle and managed the roll-out of interferon-gamma-based diagnosis for bovine TB in the UK herd for the Department for Environment, Food and Rural Affairs. While in this role, she co-published Diagnosis of tuberculosis in South African children with a T cell-based assay: a prospective cohort study with Susan Liebeschuetz.

In 2008, Ewer became a Senior Immunologist at Oxford University's Edward Jenner Institute for Vaccine Research. While there, she continued to study the effects of TB on populations and led clinical trials in an effort to discover a vaccine for Ebola. The aim of her research was to define vaccine-induced immunological parameters that correlate with protection from malaria and understand why vaccines do not always work as well as expected. During the COVID-19 pandemic, she led clinical controlled trials in an effort to find a vaccine, which was published in a 2020 study titled Safety and immunogenicity of the ChAdOx1 nCoV-19 vaccine against SARS-CoV-2: a preliminary report of a phase 1/2, single-blind, randomised controlled trial.
