= Human challenge study =

Clinical trial with intentional exposure to a pathogen

A human challenge study, also called a challenge trial or controlled human infection model (CHIM), is a type of clinical trial for a vaccine or other pharmaceutical involving the intentional exposure of the test subject to the condition tested. Human challenge studies have been ethically controversial because they involve exposing test subjects to dangers beyond those posed by potential side effects of the substance being tested. Controlled human infection studies are also used to study viruses and immune responses.

During the mid 20th and 21st century, the number of human challenge studies has been increasing. A challenge study to test promising vaccines for prevention of COVID-19 was under consideration during 2020 by several vaccine developers, including the World Health Organization (WHO), and was approved in the UK in 2021.

Over the second half of the 20th and the 21st centuries, vaccines for some 15 major pathogens have been fast-tracked in human challenge studies while contributing toward vaccine development to prevent cholera, typhoid, seasonal flu, and other infections. Since the 1980s, challenge trials which reported about adverse events have had only 0.2% of patients with serious adverse events, and no deaths. According to medical ethicists, methods of conducting clinical trials by human challenge testing have improved over the 21st century to satisfy ethical, safety, and regulatory requirements, becoming scientifically acceptable and ethically valid as long as participants are well-informed and volunteer freely, and the trials adhere to established rigor for conducting clinical research. This is also seen in both public and researchers support and acceptance of such studies.

== Design ==
The intent of a challenge study is to fast-track the timeline for providing evidence of safety and efficacy of a therapeutic drug or vaccine, especially by compressing the usually lengthy duration of Phase II–III trials (typically, many years), to just a few months. Following preliminary proof of safety and efficacy of a candidate drug or vaccine in laboratory animals and healthy humans, controlled "challenge" studies may be implemented to bypass typical Phase III research, providing an accelerated path to regulatory approval of the test compound for widespread prevention against an infectious disease, such as COVID-19.

The design of a challenge study involves first developing and testing a well-tolerated dose of the infection. A vaccine candidate would be tested for immunogenicity and safety in laboratory animals and healthy adult volunteers (100 or fewer) – which is usually a sequential process using animals first – and second, rapidly advancing its effective dose into a large-scale Phase II–III trial in low-risk, healthy volunteers (such as young adults), who would then be deliberately infected with the disease being tested against for comparison with a placebo control group. In a challenge study for a vaccine to prevent an infectious disease, participants would be closely monitored for signs of toxicity and adequate immune response, such as by producing substantial levels of antibodies against the virus causing the disease.

== Ethics ==
Human challenge studies have ethical considerations because participants are often at risk of serious adverse effects, including death. There are many examples of trials that were problematic or abusive, such as trials on captives under the Nazi regime in Germany or trials with questionable consent procedures in Guatemala by U.S. doctor John Charles Cutler, who also conducted the Tuskegee Syphilis Experiment. Special ethical issues can arise when a wealthy country finances and organizes these clinical trials in a less wealthy country.

Two commonly discussed general thresholds for risk to research participant are minimizing all risk after the infection and avoiding serious injury. Researchers typically customize other thresholds for each clinical trial.

Common reasons for participating in human challenge studies include altruism and wishing to contribute to medical progress. People who participate in these studies might be more altruistic in general than others, including possibly more likely to contribute to their communities in other ways, such as donating blood.

== Vaccines for infections ==
Challenge studies have been used to expedite evaluation of vaccines for several diseases, such as cholera, typhoid fever, malaria, influenza, streptococcal pharyngitis, tuberculosis, shigella, pertussis, and dengue fever.

Other than expediting clinical evaluation of vaccine properties, advantages of using challenge studies for vaccine candidates include minimizing bias which is inherently part of traditional cohort studies, as both the exposure (timing of infection, virus challenge dose) and outcome (assessment of blood biomarkers) are standardized. Disadvantages include high cost of conducting the trial at multiple locations and the complex management of infrastructure for a challenge trial, especially for obtaining national regulatory approval, organizing participants and trial personnel, and implementing laboratories with Good Clinical Laboratory Practice qualifications. Before beginning a challenge study, a vaccine sponsor must have demonstrated Good Manufacturing Practice standards for approval to use the candidate vaccine in humans, including expensive toxicology and immunogenicity testing. The vaccine sponsor may have required proof of safety and efficacy of adjuvants for delivering the vaccine, demonstrated what the effective vaccination schedule may be, and coordinated with international regulatory agencies and bioethicists for approval and eventual distribution, all requiring coordinated financing and planning.

=== COVID-19 ===
Human challenge studies were under consideration to hasten the development of a COVID-19 vaccine in the early stages of the pandemic, including one proposal made by bioethicist Nir Eyal, and another by rubella vaccine inventor Stanley Plotkin with bioethicist Arthur Caplan. These authors propose that the multi-year duration and multinational location of a typical Phase III efficacy clinical trial will continue as usual, while people infected with COVID-19 will continue to suffer or die. As an alternative based on emerging results from COVID-19 vaccine challenge studies, regulatory agencies could allow early emergency use of the vaccine, while the challenge study continues collecting data for eventual licensure.

In May 2020, a guidance document was issued by the WHO on criteria for conducting challenge clinical trials and providing clinical care for the participants. Following the challenge infection with or without the candidate vaccine, volunteers would be monitored closely in hospitals or clinics managed by physicians treating people with COVID-19 disease and with life-saving resources, if needed. Volunteering for a vaccine challenge study during the COVID-19 pandemic is likened to the emergency service of healthcare personnel for COVID-19-infected people, firefighters, or organ donors.

Human SARS-CoV-2 challenge studies have also been conducted to investigate the viral infection and immune response kinetics in COVID-19. Unlike patient-based studies, challenge studies provide a unique opportunity to examine the immune system before viral exposure, immediately after exposure, and in individuals who do not become infected upon exposure. These studies have enabled scientists to identify a biomarker for protection and discover that various distinct immune responses precede symptom onset, including some that are also present in individuals who do not become infected upon exposure.

In March 2024, funding for a five-year international consortium to develop and run human challenge studies for mucosal (transmission-blocking) Covid vaccines was announced on behalf of the European Union’s Horizon Europe Programme and the Coalition for Epidemic Preparedness Innovations (CEPI). Called Mucosal Immunity in human Coronavirus Challenge (MusiCC) and led by Imperial College London, trials are planned to take place in the UK, Europe, Singapore, and the United States. Representatives of the consortium and its Scientific Advisory Board met in April 2024 to start the project. At that meeting, a speaker from CEPI said that human challenge studies were a part of the goal of achieving vaccines for new pandemic diseases in 100 days. Two trials to test doses of strains of SARS-CoV-2 for challenge studies were begun in 2024, in London and Singapore.
