= APG =

APG may refer to:

- Aberdeen Proving Ground, a United States Army installation in Aberdeen, Maryland
  - Phillips Army Airfield (IATA code), the airfield of the above
- Aboriginal Provisional Government, Indigenous Australian independence movement
- Adams Publishing Group, an American publishing company
- Alkyl polyglycoside, a class of surfactants
- Ambulatory Patient Group
- André-Pierre Gignac (born 1985), French footballer
- Android Privacy Guard, an implementation of Pretty Good Privacy for the Android operating system
- Angiosperm Phylogeny Group, a collaboration of botanists, publishing classification systems of flowering plants
- Annealed pyrolytic graphite, a thermally conductive form of synthetic graphite
- Anterior pituitary gland, an endocrine gland
- APG (pension fund), a Netherlands-based pension fund established under the Stichting Pensioenfonds ABP
- Arc pair grammar
- Artist Placement Group, an art group founded in 1966
- ASEAN Power Grid, a plan by the Association of South East Asian Nations (ASEAN) to create a unified power grid and electricity market
- Asia/Pacific Group on Money Laundering, the FATF-style regional body for the Asia and Pacific region
- Aspley Guise railway station, from its National Rail code
- Assists per game, in basketball
- Associated petroleum gas
- Association of Professional Genealogists
- Atlas of Peculiar Galaxies
- Austrian Power Grid, Austrian electric power transmission company
- Automated Password Generator, a software generating password
- Automatic platform gate, a safety facility preventing awaiting passenger falling from station platform to rail tracks
- Philippines AirAsia (ICAO code)
