= Oxford–AstraZeneca COVID-19 vaccine =

Viral vector vaccine for prevention of COVID-19

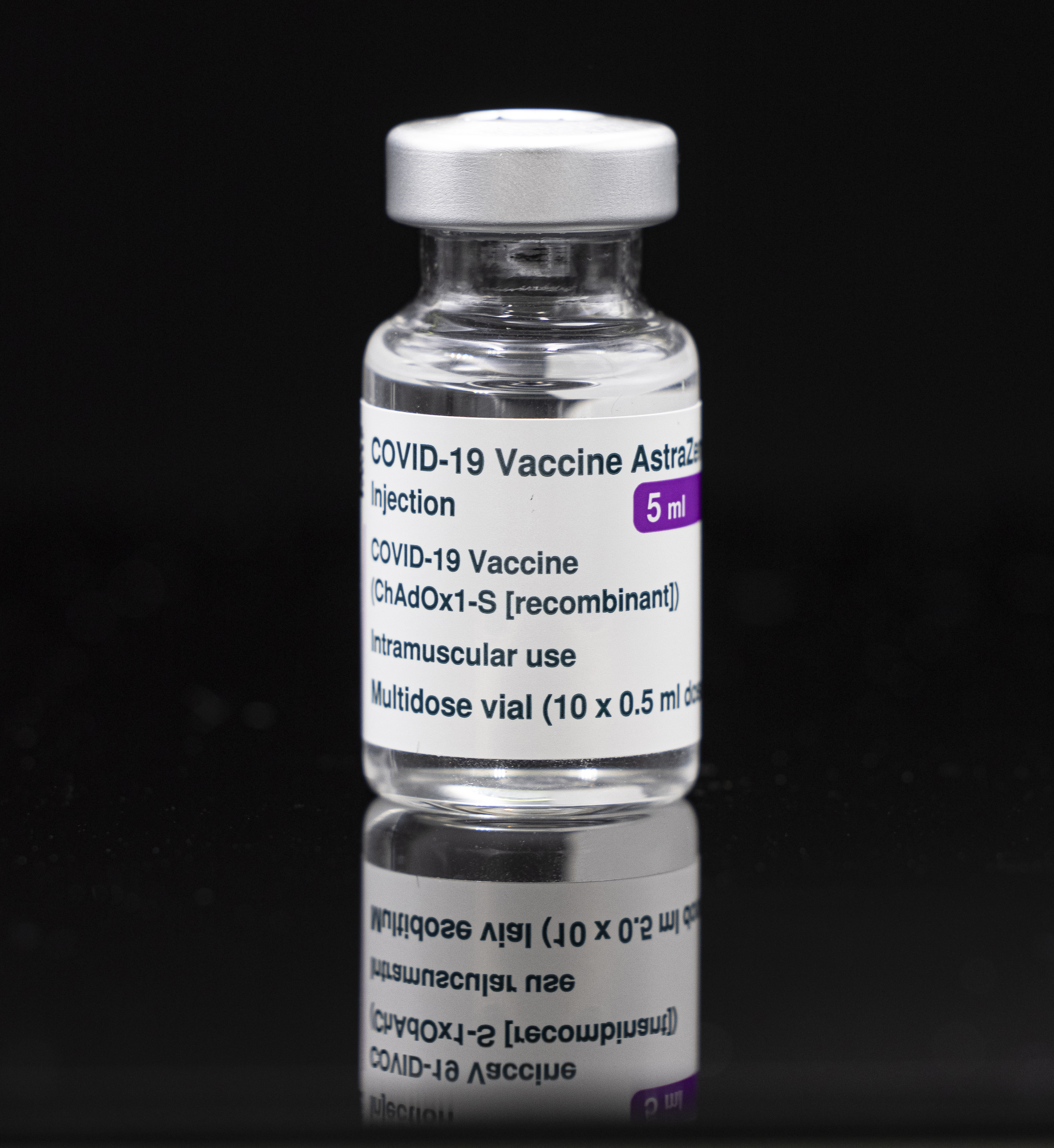
- A vial of COVID-19 Vaccine AstraZeneca

Vaccine description
- Target: SARS-CoV-2
- Vaccine type: Viral vector

Clinical data
- Trade names: Vaxzevria, Covishield
- Other names: AZD1222, ChAdOx1 nCoV-19, ChAdOx1-S, COVID-19 Vaccine AstraZeneca, AstraZeneca COVID-19 Vaccine, AZD2816
- License data: US DailyMed: AstraZeneca_COVID-19_Vaccine
- Pregnancy category: AU: B1
- Routes of administration: Intramuscular
- ATC code: J07BN02 (WHO)

Legal status
- Legal status: AU: S4 (Prescription only); BR: Approved; CA: ℞-only / Schedule D; UK: POM (Prescription only); EU: Marketing authorisation issued; KR: Approved; Full list of Oxford–AstraZeneca vaccine authorisations

Identifiers
- CAS Number: 2420395-83-9
- DrugBank: DB15656
- UNII: B5S3K2V0G8
- KEGG: D12115

The Oxford–AstraZeneca COVID‑19 vaccine, sold under the brand names Covishield and Vaxzevria among others, is a viral vector vaccine for the prevention of COVID-19. It was developed in the United Kingdom by Oxford University and British-Swedish company AstraZeneca, using as a vector the modified chimpanzee adenovirus ChAdOx1. The vaccine is given by intramuscular injection. Studies carried out in 2020 showed that the efficacy of the vaccine is 76.0% at preventing symptomatic COVID-19 beginning at 22 days following the first dose and 81.3% after the second dose. A study in Scotland found that, for symptomatic COVID-19 infection after the second dose, the vaccine is 81% effective against the Alpha variant (lineage B.1.1.7) and 61% against the Delta variant (lineage B.1.617.2).

The vaccine is stable at refrigerator temperatures and has a good safety profile, with side effects including injection-site pain, headache, and nausea, all generally resolving within a few days. More rarely, anaphylaxis may occur; the UK Medicines and Healthcare products Regulatory Agency (MHRA) has 268 reports out of some 21.2 million vaccinations as of 14 April 2021. In very rare cases (around 1 in 100,000 people), the vaccine has been associated with an increased risk of blood clots when in combination with low levels of blood platelets (embolic and thrombotic events after COVID-19 vaccination). According to the European Medicines Agency, as of 4 April 2021, a total of 222 cases of blood clots had been recorded among 34 million people who had been vaccinated in the European Economic Area (a percentage of 0.0007%).

On 30 December 2020, the vaccine was first approved for use in the UK vaccination programme, and the first vaccination outside of a trial was administered on 4 January 2021. The vaccine has since been approved by several medicine agencies worldwide, such as the European Medicines Agency (EMA), and the Australian Therapeutic Goods Administration (provisional approval in February 2021), and was approved for an Emergency Use Listing by the World Health Organization (WHO). More than 3 billion doses of the vaccine were supplied to countries worldwide. Some countries have limited its use to elderly people at higher risk for severe COVID-19 illness due to concerns over the very rare side effects of the vaccine in younger individuals.

The vaccine is no longer in production. AstraZeneca withdrew its marketing authorisations for the vaccine from the European market in March 2024, and worldwide by May 2024.

== Medical uses ==
The Oxford–AstraZeneca COVID‑19 vaccine is used to provide protection against infection by the SARS-CoV-2 virus in order to prevent COVID-19 in adults aged 18 years and older. The medicine is administered by two 0.5 ml (0.017 US fl oz) doses given by intramuscular injection into the deltoid muscle (upper arm). The initial course consists of two doses with an interval of 4 to 12 weeks between doses. The World Health Organization (WHO) recommends an interval of 8 to 12 weeks between doses for optimal efficacy.

As of August 2021, there is no evidence that a third booster dose is needed to prevent severe disease in healthy adults.

=== Effectiveness ===
Preliminary data from a study in Brazil with 61 million individuals from January to June 2021, indicate that the effectiveness against infection, hospitalisation and death is similar between most age groups, but protection against all these outcomes is significantly reduced in those aged 90 year of age or older, attributable to immunosenescence.

A vaccine is generally considered effective if the estimate is ≥50% with a >30% lower limit of the 95% confidence interval. Effectiveness is generally expected to slowly decrease over time.

Initial effectiveness by variant
Doses	Severity of illness	Delta	Alpha	Gamma	Beta
1	Asymptomatic	18% (9–25%)	37% (32–42%)	33% (32–34%)	Not reported
1	Symptomatic	33% (23–41%)	39% (32–45%)	33% (26–40%)	Not reported
1	Hospitalisation	71% (51–83%) (Note: Preliminary data of effectiveness against hospitalisation referenced by Public Health England.)	76% (61–85%)	52% (50–53%)	Not reported
2	Asymptomatic	60% (53–66%)	73% (66–78%)	70% (69–71%)	Not reported
2	Symptomatic	61% (51–70%)	81% (72–87%)	78% (69–84%)	10% (−77 to 55%) (Note: Efficacy from a study with 2026 participants.)
2	Hospitalisation	92% (75–97%)	86% (53–96%)	87% (85–88%)	Not reported

Preliminary data suggest that the initial two-dose regimen is not effective against symptomatic disease caused by the Omicron variant from the 15th week onwards. A regimen of two doses of the Oxford–AstraZeneca vaccine followed by a booster dose of the Pfizer–BioNTech or the Moderna vaccine is initially about 60% effective against symptomatic disease caused by Omicron, then after 10 weeks the effectiveness drops to about 35% with the Pfizer–BioNTech and to about 45% with the Moderna vaccine. The vaccine remains effective against severe disease, hospitalisation and death.

== Contraindications ==
The Oxford–AstraZeneca COVID-19 vaccine should not be administered to people who have had capillary leak syndrome.

== Adverse effects ==
The most common side effects in the clinical trials were usually mild or moderate and got better within a few days after vaccination.

Vomiting, diarrhoea, fever, swelling, redness at the injection site and low levels of blood platelets occurred in less than 1 in 10 people. Enlarged lymph nodes, decreased appetite, dizziness, sleepiness, sweating, abdominal pain, itching and rash occurred in less than 1 in 100 people.

An increased risk of the rare and potentially fatal thrombosis with thrombocytopenia syndrome (TTS) has been associated with mainly younger female recipients of the vaccine. Analysis of VigiBase reported embolic and thrombotic events after vaccination with Oxford–AstraZeneca, Moderna and Pfizer vaccines, found a temporally related incidence of 0.21 cases per 1 million vaccinated-days.

Anaphylaxis and other allergic reactions are known side effects of the Oxford–AstraZeneca COVID-19 vaccine. The European Medicines Agency (EMA) has assessed 41 cases of anaphylaxis from around 5 million vaccinations in the United Kingdom.

Capillary leak syndrome is a possible side effect of the vaccine.

The European Medicines Agency (EMA) listed Guillain-Barré syndrome as a very rare side effect of the Oxford–AstraZeneca COVID-19 vaccine and added a warning in the product information.

Additional side effects include tinnitus (persistent ringing in the ears), paraesthesia (unusual feeling in the skin, such as tingling or a crawling sensation), and hypoaesthesia (decreased feeling or sensitivity, especially in the skin).

== Pharmacology ==
The Oxford–AstraZeneca COVID-19 vaccine is a viral vector vaccine containing a modified, replication-deficient chimpanzee adenovirus ChAdOx1, containing the full‐length codon‐optimised coding sequence of SARS-CoV-2 spike protein along with a tissue plasminogen activator (tPA) leader sequence. The adenovirus is called replication-deficient because some of its essential genes required for replication were deleted and replaced by a gene coding for the spike protein. However, the HEK 293 cells used for vaccine manufacturing, express several adenoviral genes, including the ones required for the vector to replicate. Following vaccination, the adenovirus vector enters the cells and releases its genes, in the form of DNA, which are transported to the cell nucleus; thereafter, the cell's machinery does the transcription from DNA into mRNA and the translation into spike protein. The approach to use adenovirus as a vector to deliver spike protein is similar to the approach used by the Johnson & Johnson COVID-19 vaccine and the Russian Sputnik V COVID-19 vaccine.

The protein of interest is the spike protein, a protein on the exterior of the virus that enables SARS-type coronaviruses to enter cells through the ACE2 receptor. Following vaccination, the production of coronavirus spike protein within the body will cause the immune system to attack the spike protein with antibodies and T-cells if the virus later enters the body.

== Manufacturing ==
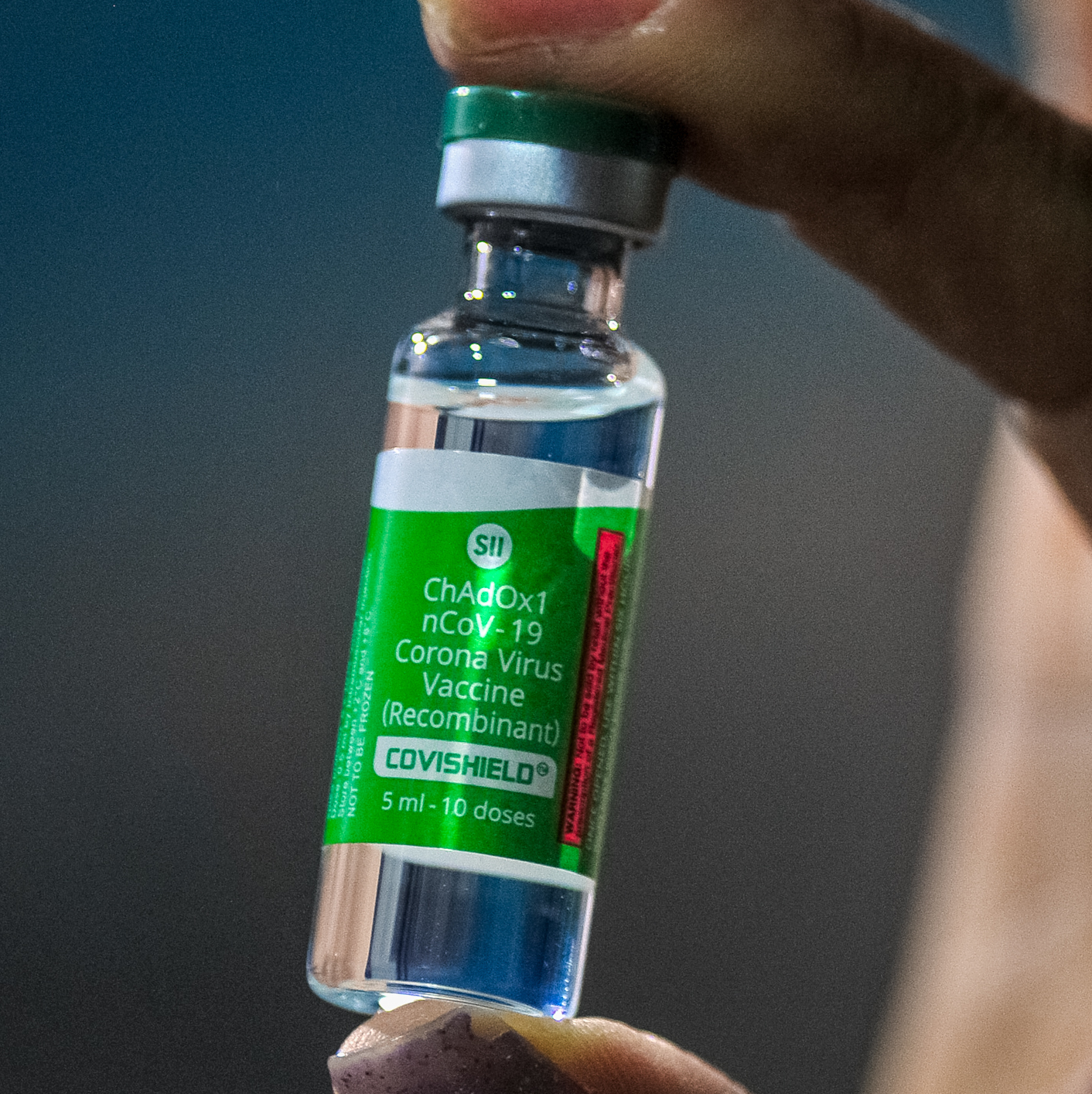
A vial of the Oxford-AstraZeneca COVID-19 vaccine produced in the Serum Institute of India (SII) as "Covishield"

To manufacture the vaccine the virus is propagated on HEK 293 cell lines and then purified multiple times to completely remove the cell culture.

The vaccine costs around US$3 to US$4 per dose to manufacture. On 17 December 2020, a tweet by the Belgian Budget State Secretary revealed that the European Union (EU) would pay €1.78 (US$2.16) per dose, The New York Times suggesting the lower price might relate to factors including investment in vaccine production infrastructure by the EU.

As of March 2021, the vaccine active substance (ChAdOx1-SARS-COV-2) was being produced at several sites worldwide, with AstraZeneca claiming to have established 25 sites in 15 countries. The UK sites at that time were Oxford and Keele, with bottling and finishing in Wrexham. Other sites at that time included the Serum Institute of India at Pune. The Halix site at Leiden was approved by the EMA on 26 March 2021, joining three other sites approved by the EU.

== History ==
The vaccine arose from a collaboration between Oxford University's Jenner Institute and Vaccitech, a private company spun off from the university, with financing from Oxford Sciences Innovation, Google Ventures, and Sequoia Capital, among others. The first batch of the COVID-19 vaccine produced for clinical testing was developed by Oxford University's Jenner Institute and the Oxford Vaccine Group in collaboration with Italian manufacturer Advent Srl located in Pomezia. The team is led by Sarah Gilbert, Adrian Hill, Andrew Pollard, Teresa Lambe, Sandy Douglas and Catherine Green.

=== Early development ===
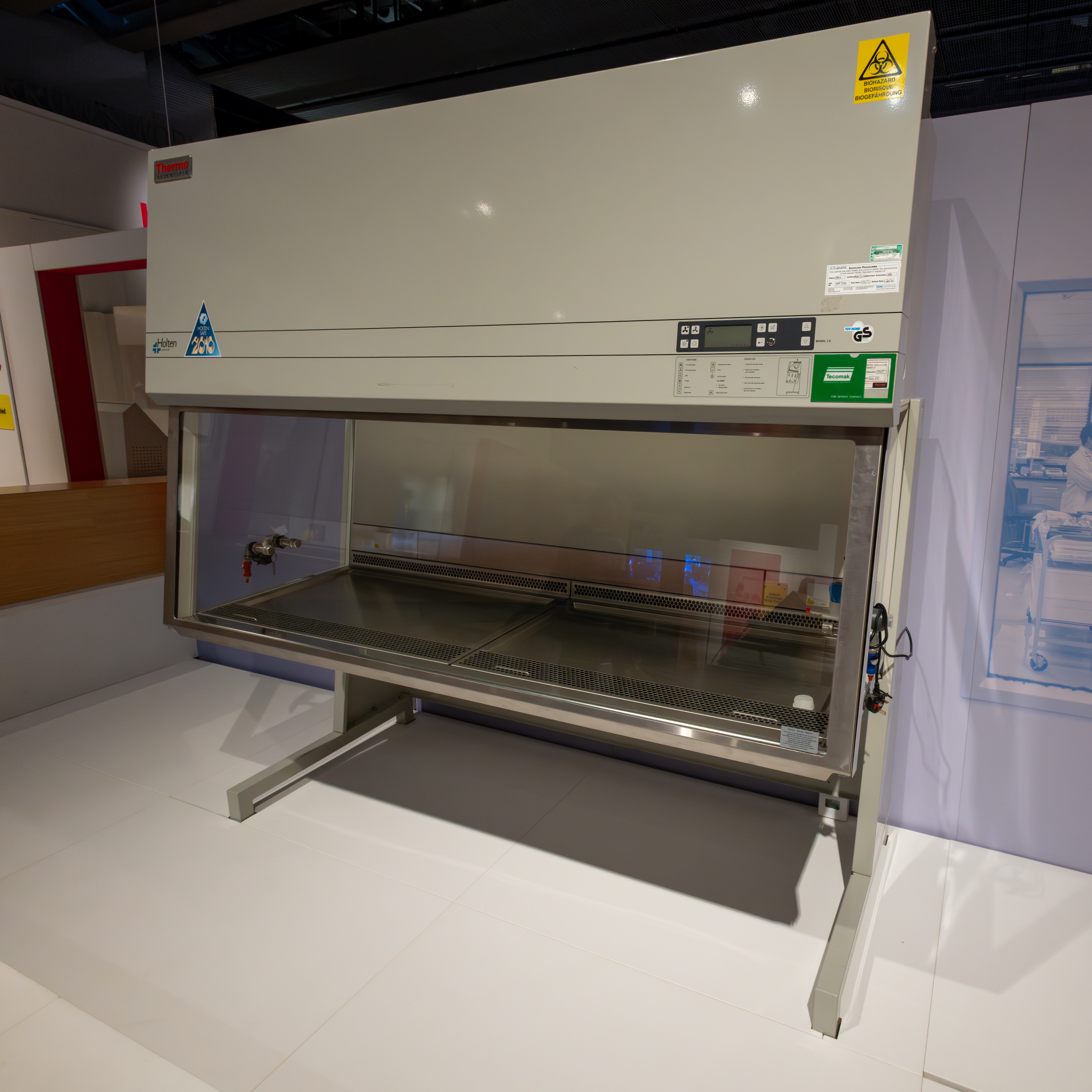
Biosafety cabinet used by Oxford Vaccine Group in the early stages of developing a COVID-19 vaccine

In February 2020, the Jenner Institute agreed a collaboration with the Italian company Advent Srl for the production of a batch of 1,000 doses of a vaccine candidate for clinical trials. Originally, Oxford intended to donate the rights to manufacture and market the vaccine to any drugmaker who wanted to do so, but after the Gates Foundation urged Oxford to find a large company partner to get its COVID-19 vaccine to market, the university withdrew this offer in May 2020. The UK government then encouraged Oxford to work with AstraZeneca, a company based in Europe, instead of Merck & Co., a US-based company (The Guardian reported the initial partner was the German-based Merck Group instead). Government ministers also had concerns that a vaccine manufactured in the US would not be available in the UK, according to anonymous sources in The Wall Street Journal. Financial considerations at Oxford and spin-out companies may have also played a part in the decision to partner with AstraZeneca.

An initially not-for-profit licensing agreement was signed between the university and AstraZeneca PLC, in May 2020, with 1 billion doses of potential supply secured, with the UK reserving access to the initial 100 million doses. Furthermore, the US reserved 300 million doses, as well as the authority to perform Phase III trials in the US. The collaboration was also granted £68m of UK government funding, and US$1.2bn of US government funding, to support the development of the vaccine. In June 2020, the US National Institute of Allergy and Infectious Diseases (NIAID) confirmed that the third phase of trials for the vaccine would begin in July 2020. On 4 June, AstraZeneca announced that the COVAX programme for equitable vaccine access managed by the WHO and financed by CEPI and GAVI had spent $750m to secure 300 million doses of the vaccine to be distributed to low-income or under-developed countries.

Preliminary data from a study that reconstructed funding for the vaccine indicates that funding was at least 97% public, almost all from UK government departments, British and American scientific institutes, the European Commission and charities.

=== Clinical trials ===
In July 2020, AstraZeneca partnered with IQVIA to accelerate the timeframe for clinical trials being planned or conducted in the US. On 31 August, AstraZeneca announced that it had begun enrolment of adults for a US-funded, 30,000-subject late-stage study.

Clinical trials for the vaccine candidate were halted worldwide on 8 September, as AstraZeneca investigated a possible adverse reaction which occurred in a trial participant in the UK. Trials were resumed on 13 September after AstraZeneca and Oxford, along with UK regulators, concluded it was safe to do so. AstraZeneca was later criticised for refusing to provide details about potentially serious neurological side effects in two trial participants who had received the experimental vaccine in the UK. While the trials resumed in the UK, Brazil, South Africa, Japan and India, the US did not resume clinical trials of the vaccine until 23 October. This was due to a separate investigation by the Food and Drug Administration surrounding a patient illness that triggered a clinical hold, according to the US Department of Health and Human Services (HHS) Secretary Alex Azar.

The results of the COV002 phase II/III trial showed that immunity lasts for at least one year after a single dose.

==== Results of phase III trial ====
On 23 November 2020, the first interim data was released by Oxford University and AstraZeneca from the vaccine's ongoing phase III trials. The interim data reported a 70% efficacy, based on combined results of 62% and 90% from different groups of participants who were given different dosages. The decision to combine results from two different dosages was met with criticism from some who questioned why the results were being combined. AstraZeneca responded to the criticism by agreeing to carry out a new multi-country trial using the lower dose, which had led to the 90% claim.

The full publication of the interim results from four ongoing phase III trials on 8 December allowed regulators and scientists to begin evaluating the vaccine's efficacy. The December report showed that at 21 days after the second dose and beyond, there were no hospitalisations or severe disease in those who received the vaccine, compared to 10 cases in the control groups. The rate of serious adverse events was balanced between the active and control groups, which suggested that the active vaccine did not pose safety concerns beyond a rate experienced in the general population. One case of transverse myelitis was reported 14 days after the second-dose was administered as being possibly related to vaccination, with an independent neurological committee considering the most likely diagnosis to be of an idiopathic, short-segment, spinal cord demyelination. The other two cases of transverse myelitis, one in the vaccine group and the other in the control group, were considered to be unrelated to vaccination.

A subsequent analysis, published on 19 February 2021, showed an efficacy of 76.0% at preventing symptomatic COVID-19 beginning at 22 days following the first dose, increasing to 81.3% when the second dose is given 12 weeks or more after the first. However, the results did not show any protection against asymptomatic COVID-19 following only one dose. Beginning 14 days following timely administration of a second dose, with different duration from the first dose depending on trials, the results showed 66.7% efficacy at preventing symptomatic infection, and the UK arm (which evaluated asymptomatic infections in participants) was inconclusive as to the prevention of asymptomatic infection. Efficacy was higher at greater intervals between doses, peaking at around 80% when the second dose was given at 12 weeks or longer after the first. Preliminary results from another study with 120 participants under 55 years of age showed that delaying the second dose by up to 45 weeks increases the resulting immune response and that a booster (third) dose given at least six months later produces a strong immune response. A booster dose may not be necessary, but it alleviates concerns that the body would develop immunity to the vaccine's viral vector, which would reduce the potency of annual inoculations.

On 22 March 2021, AstraZeneca released interim results from the phase III trial conducted in the US that showed efficacy of 79% at preventing symptomatic COVID-19 and 100% efficacy at preventing severe disease and hospitalisation. The next day, the National Institute of Allergy and Infectious Diseases (NIAID) published a statement countering that those results may have relied on "outdated information" that may have provided an incomplete view of the efficacy data. AstraZeneca later revised its efficacy claim to be 76% after further review of the data. On 29 September 2021, AstraZeneca reported a final 74% efficacy rate against symptomatic disease in the trial conducted in the United States, Chile and Peru.

==== Single dose effectiveness ====
A study on the effectiveness of a first dose of the Pfizer–BioNTech or Oxford–AstraZeneca COVID-19 vaccines against COVID-19 related hospitalisation in Scotland was based on a national prospective cohort study of 5.4 million people. Between 8 December 2020 and 15 February 2021, 1,137,775 participants were vaccinated in the study, 490,000 of whom were given the Oxford–AstraZeneca vaccine. The first dose of the Oxford–AstraZeneca vaccine was associated with a vaccine effect of 94% for COVID-19-related hospitalisation at 28–34 days post-vaccination. Combined results (all vaccinated participants, whether Pfizer–BioNTech or Oxford–AstraZeneca) showed a significant vaccine effect for prevention of COVID-19-related hospitalisation, which was comparable when restricting the analysis to those aged ≥80 years (81%). The majority of the participants over the age of 65 were given the Oxford–AstraZeneca vaccine.

==== Nasal spray ====
On 25 March 2021, the University of Oxford announced the start of a phase I clinical trial to investigate the efficacy of an intranasal spray method.

=== Approvals ===
The first country to issue a temporary or emergency approval for the Oxford–AstraZeneca vaccine was the UK. The Medicines and Healthcare products Regulatory Agency (MHRA) began a review of efficacy and safety data on 27 November 2020, followed by approval for use on 30 December 2020, becoming the second vaccine approved for use in the national vaccination programme. The BBC reported that the first person to receive the vaccine outside of clinical trials was vaccinated on 4 January 2021.

The European Medicines Agency (EMA) began review of the vaccine on 12 January 2021, and stated in a press release that a recommendation could be issued by the agency by 29 January, followed by the European Commission deciding on a conditional marketing authorisation within days. On 29 January 2021, the EMA recommended granting a conditional marketing authorisation for AZD1222 for people 18 years of age and older, and the recommendation was accepted by the European Commission the same day. Prior to approval across the EU, the Hungarian regulator unilaterally approved the vaccine instead of waiting for EMA approval. In October 2022, the conditional marketing authorisation was converted to a standard one.

On 30 January 2021, the Vietnamese Ministry of Health approved the AstraZeneca vaccine for use, becoming the first vaccine to be approved in Vietnam. The vaccine has since been approved by a number of non-EU countries, including Argentina, Bangladesh, Brazil, the Dominican Republic, El Salvador, India, Israel, Malaysia, Mexico, Nepal, Pakistan, the Philippines, Sri Lanka, and Taiwan regulatory authorities for emergency usage in their respective countries.

South Korea granted approval of the AstraZeneca vaccine on 10 February 2021, thus becoming the first vaccine to be approved for use in that country. The regulator recommended the two-shot regimen be used in all adults, including the elderly, noting that consideration is needed when administering the vaccine to individuals over 65 years of age due to limited data from that demographic in clinical trials. On the same day, the World Health Organization (WHO) issued interim guidance and recommended the AstraZeneca vaccine for all adults, its Strategic Advisory Group of Experts also having considered use where variants were present and concluded there was no need not to recommend it.

In February 2021, the government and regulatory authorities in Australia (16 February 2021) and Canada (26 February 2021) granted approval for temporary use of the vaccine.

On 19 November 2021, the vaccine was approved for use in Canada.

=== Suspensions ===
==== South Africa ====
On 7 February 2021, the vaccine rollout in South Africa was suspended. Researchers from the University of the Witwatersrand released interim, non-peer-reviewed data that suggested the AstraZeneca vaccine provided minimal protection against mild or moderate disease infection among young people. The BBC reported on 8 February 2021 that Katherine O'Brien, director of immunisation at the WHO, felt it was "really plausible" the AstraZeneca vaccine could have a "meaningful impact" on the Beta variant (lineage B.1.351), particularly in preventing serious illness and death. The same report also indicated the Deputy Chief Medical Officer for England Jonathan Van-Tam said the Witwatersrand study did not change his opinion that the AstraZeneca vaccine was "rather likely" to have an effect on severe disease from the Beta variant. The South African government subsequently cancelled the use of the AstraZeneca vaccine.

Vaccination in Austria, 2021

==== European Union ====
In March 2021, Austria suspended the use of one batch of vaccine after two people had blood clots after vaccination, one of whom died. In total, four cases of blood clots have been identified in the same batch of 1 million doses. Although no causal link with vaccination has been shown, several other countries, including Denmark, Norway, Iceland, Bulgaria, Ireland, Italy, Spain, Germany, France, the Netherlands and Slovenia also halted the vaccine rollout over the following days while waiting for the EMA to finish a safety review triggered by the cases.

In April 2021, the EMA concluded its safety review and concluded that unusual blood clots with low blood platelets should be listed as very rare side effects while reaffirming the overall benefits of the vaccine. Following this announcement EU countries have resumed use of the vaccine with some limiting its use to elderly people at higher risk for severe COVID-19 illness.

In March 2021, the Norwegian government temporarily suspended the vaccine's use, awaiting more information regarding potential adverse effects. Then, in April, the Norwegian Institute of Public Health recommended to the government to permanently suspended vaccination with AstraZeneca due to the "rare but severe incidents with low platelet counts, blood clots, and haemorrhages," since in the case of Norway, "the risk of dying after vaccination with the AstraZeneca vaccine would be higher than the risk of dying from the disease, particularly for younger people." At the same time, the Norwegian government announced their decision to wait for a final decision and to establish an expert group to provide a broader assessment on the safety of the AstraZeneca and Janssen vaccines. In May, the expert committee also recommended suspending the use of both vaccines. Finally, in May —two months after the initial suspension— the Prime Minister of Norway announced that the government decided to completely remove the AstraZeneca vaccine from the Norwegian Coronavirus Immunisation Programme, and people who have had the first will be offered another coronavirus vaccine for their second dose.

In March 2021, the German Ministry of Health announced that the use of the vaccine in people aged 60 and below should be the result of a recipient-specific discussion, and that younger patients could still be given the AstraZeneca vaccine, but only "at the discretion of doctors, and after individual risk analysis and thorough explanation".

In April, the Danish Health Authority suspended use of the vaccine. The Danish Health Authority said that it had other vaccines available, and that the next target groups being a lower-risk population had to be "[weighed] against the fact that we now have a known risk of severe adverse effects from vaccination with AstraZeneca, even if the risk in absolute terms is slight."

A 2021 study found that the decisions to suspend the vaccine led to increased vaccine hesitancy across the West, even in countries that did not suspend the vaccine.

In October 2022, the conditional marketing authorisation was converted to a standard one.

Despite the continued authorisation, most EU countries stopped the administration of the vaccine by end of 2021. After an initial quick uptake, the number of doses administered remained at 67 million since October 2021.

AstraZeneca withdrew its marketing authorisation for the vaccine from the European Union in March 2024.

==== Canada ====
On 29 March 2021, Canada's National Advisory Committee on Immunization (NACI) recommended that distribution of the vaccine be suspended for patients below the age of 55; NACI chairwoman Caroline Quach-Thanh stated that the risk of blood clots was higher in younger patients, and that NACI needed to "evolve" its recommendations as new data becomes available. Most Canadian provinces subsequently announced that they would follow this guidance. As of 20 April 2021 there had been three confirmed cases of blood clotting tied to the vaccine in Canada, out of over 700,000 doses administered in the country.

Beginning 18 April 2021, amid a major third wave of the virus, several Canadian provinces announced that they would backtrack on the NACI recommendation and extend eligibility for the AstraZeneca vaccine to residents as young as 40 years old, including Alberta, British Columbia, Ontario, and Saskatchewan. Quebec also extended eligibility to residents 45 and older. The NACI guidance was a recommendation which did not affect the formal approval of the vaccine by Health Canada for all adults over 18; it stated on 14 April 2021 that it had updated its warnings on the vaccine as part of an ongoing review, but that "the potential risk of these events is very rare, and the benefits of the vaccine in protecting against COVID-19 outweigh its potential risks."

On 23 April 2021, citing the current state of supplies for mRNA-based vaccines and new data, NACI issued a recommendation that the vaccine could be offered to patients as young as 30 years old if benefits outweighed the risks, and the patient did "not wish to wait for an mRNA vaccine".

Beginning 11 May 2021, multiple provinces announced that they would suspend use of the AstraZeneca vaccine once again, citing either supply issues or the blood clotting risk. Some provinces stated that they planned to only use the AstraZeneca vaccine for outstanding second doses. On 1 June 2021, NACI issued guidance, citing the safety concerns as well as European studies showing an improved antibody response, recommending that an mRNA vaccine be administered as a second dose to patients that had received the AstraZeneca vaccine as their first dose.

==== Indonesia ====
In March 2021, Indonesia halted the rollout of the vaccine while awaiting more safety guidance from the World Health Organization, and then resumed using the vaccine on 19 March.

==== Australia ====
In June 2021, Australia revised its recommendations for the rollout of the vaccine, recommending that the Pfizer Comirnaty vaccine be used for people aged under 60 years if the person has not already received a first dose of AstraZeneca COVID-19 vaccine. The AstraZeneca COVID-19 vaccine can still be used in people aged under 60 years where the benefits are likely to outweigh the risks for that person, and the person has made an informed decision based on an understanding of the risks and benefits in consultation with a medical professional.

==== Malaysia ====
After initially approving the use of the AstraZeneca vaccine, Malaysian health authorities removed the vaccine from the country's mainstream vaccination programme due to public concerns about its safety in late April 2021. The AstraZeneca vaccines was distributed in designated vaccination centres, with the public being allowed to register for the vaccine on a voluntary basis. All 268,800 doses of the initial batch of the vaccine were fully booked in three and a half hours after the registration opened for residents of the state of Selangor and the Federal Territory of Kuala Lumpur. A second batch of 1,261,000 doses was offered to residents of the states of Selangor, Penang, Johore, Sarawak, and the Federal Territory of Kuala Lumpur. A total of 29,183 doses were reserved for previously waitlisted registrants, and 275,208 doses were taken up by senior citizens during a grace 3-day period. The remaining 956,609 doses were then offered to those aged 18 and above, and was completely booked within an hour.

On 10 May 2024, Health Minister Dzulkefly Ahmad announced that the Malaysian Government would continue to offer care to individuals suffering from adverse effects of COVID-19 vaccines including the AstraZeneca vaccine. He also confirmed that the Malaysian Government had data on adverse effects caused by COVID-19 vaccines and methods for treating the side effects. On 13 May, Deputy Health Minister Lukanisman Awang Sauni confirmed that the Malaysian Government would release a report on the AstraZeneca vaccine's adverse effects later in the week.

=== Safety review ===
In March 2021, the European Medicines Agency (EMA) stated that there is no indication that vaccination has been the cause of the observed clotting issues, which were not listed as side effects of the vaccine. At the time, according to the EMA, the number of thromboembolic events in vaccinated people was no higher than that seen in the general population. As of 11 March 2021, 30 cases of events of thromboembolism events had been reported among the almost 5 million people vaccinated in the European Economic Area. The UK's MHRA also stated that after more than 11 million doses administered, it had not been confirmed that the reported blood clots were caused by the vaccine and that vaccinations would not be stopped. On 12 March 2021 the WHO stated that a causal relationship had not been shown and that vaccinations should continue. AstraZeneca confirmed on 14 March 2021 that after examining over 17 million people who have been vaccinated with the vaccine, no evidence of an increased risk of blood clots in any particular country was found. The company reported that as of 8 March 2021, across the EU and UK, there had been 15 events of deep vein thrombosis and 22 events of pulmonary embolism reported among those given the vaccine, which is much lower than would be expected to occur naturally in a general population of that size.

In March 2021, the German Paul-Ehrlich Institute (PEI) reported that out of 1.6 million vaccinations, seven cases of cerebral vein thrombosis in conjunction with a deficiency of blood platelets had occurred. According to the PEI, the number of cases of cerebral vein thrombosis after vaccination was statistically significantly higher than the number that would occur in the general population during a similar time period. These reports prompted the PEI to recommend a temporary suspension of vaccinations until the EMA had completed their review of the cases.

The World Health Organization (WHO) issued a statement on 17 March, regarding the AstraZeneca COVID-19 vaccine safety signals, and still considers the benefits of the vaccine to outweigh its potential risks, further recommending that vaccinations continue. On 18 March, the EMA announced that out of the around 20 million people who had received the vaccine, general blood clotting rates were normal, but that it had identified seven cases of disseminated intravascular coagulation, and eighteen cases of cerebral venous sinus thrombosis. A causal link with the vaccine was not proven, but the EMA said it would conduct further analysis and recommended informing people eligible for the vaccine of the fact that the possibility it may cause rare clotting problems had not been disproven. The EMA confirmed that the vaccine's benefits outweighed the risks. On 25 March, the EMA released updated product information.

According to the EMA, 100,000 cases of blood clots occur naturally each month in the EU, and the risk of blood clots was not statistically higher in the vaccinated population. The EMA noted that COVID-19 itself causes an increased risk of the development of blood clots, and as such the vaccine would lower the risk of the formation of blood clots even if the 15 cases' causal link were to be confirmed. Italy resumed vaccinations after the EMA's statement, with most of the remaining European countries following suit and resuming their AstraZeneca inoculations shortly thereafter. To reassure the public of the vaccine's safety, the British and French Prime Ministers, Boris Johnson and Jean Castex, had themselves vaccinated with it in front of the media shortly after the restart of the AstraZeneca vaccination campaigns in the EU.

In April 2021, the EMA issued its direct healthcare professional communication (DHPC) about the vaccine. The DHPC indicated that a causal relationship between the vaccine and blood clots (thrombosis) in combination with low blood platelets (thrombocytopenia) was plausible and identified it as a very rare side effect of the vaccine. According to the EMA these very rare adverse events occur in around 1 out of 100,000 vaccinated people.

=== Further development ===
==== Efficacy against variants ====
A study published in April 2021 by researchers from the COVID-19 Genomics United Kingdom Consortium, the AMPHEUS Project, and the Oxford COVID-19 Vaccine Trial Group indicated the Oxford–AstraZeneca vaccine showed somewhat reduced efficacy against infection with the Alpha variant (lineage B.1.1.7), with 70.4% efficacy in absolute terms against Alpha versus 81.5% against other variants. Despite this, the researchers concluded that the vaccine remained effective at preventing symptomatic infection from this variant and that vaccinated individuals infected symptomatically typically had shorter duration of symptoms and less viral load, thereby reducing the risk of transmission. Following the identification of notable variants of concern, concern arose that the E484K mutation, present in the Beta and Gamma variants (lineages B.1.351 and P.1), could evade the protection given by the vaccine. In February 2021, the collaboration was working to adapt the vaccine to target these variants, with the expectation that a modified vaccine would be available "in a few months" as a "booster" given to people who had already completed the two-dose series of the original vaccine.

In June 2021, AstraZeneca published a press release confirming undergoing Phase II/III trials of an AZD2816 COVID-19 variant vaccine candidate. The new vaccine would be based on the current Vaxzevria adenoviral vector platform but modified with spike proteins based on the Beta (B.1.351 lineage) variant. Phase II/III trials saw 2849 volunteers participating from UK, South Africa, Brazil and Poland with parallel dosing of both the current Oxford-AstraZeneca vaccine and the variant vaccine candidate. By September 2021, AZD2816 vaccine candidate is still undergoing Phase II/III trials with intent to switch to this vaccine if approved by government regulators. Particularly the government of Thailand, with delivery of additional 60 million doses of AstraZeneca COVID-19 Vaccine agreed for 2022.

==== Heterologous prime-boost vaccination ====
In December 2020, a clinical trial was registered to examine a heterologous prime-boost vaccination course consisting of one dose of the Oxford–AstraZeneca vaccine followed by Sputnik Light based on the Ad26 vector 29 days later.

After suspensions due to rare cases of blood clots in March 2021, Canada and several European countries recommended receiving a different vaccine for the second dose. Despite the lack of clinical data on the efficacy and safety of such heterologous combinations, some experts believe that doing so may boost immunity, and several studies have begun to examine this effect.

In June 2021, preliminary results from a study of 463 participants showed that a heterologous prime-boost vaccination course consisting of one dose of the Oxford–AstraZeneca vaccine followed by one dose of the Pfizer–BioNTech vaccine produced the strongest T cell activity and an antibody level almost as high as two doses of the Pfizer-BioNTech vaccine. The reversal of the order resulted in T cell activity at half the potency and one-seventh the antibody levels, the latter still five times higher than two doses of Oxford–AstraZeneca. The lowest T cell activity was observed in homologous courses, when both doses were of the same vaccine.

In July 2021, a study of 216 participants found that a heterologous prime-boost vaccination course consisting of one dose of the Oxford–AstraZeneca vaccine followed by one dose of the Moderna vaccine produced a similar level of neutralising antibodies and T cell responses with increased spike-specific cytotoxic T cells compared to a homologous course consisting of two doses of the Moderna vaccine.

== Society and culture ==
The Oxford University and AstraZeneca collaboration was seen as having the potential as being a low-cost vaccine with no onerous storage requirements. However, a series of events including miscommunication, reports of supply difficulties (responsibility of which possibly were due to the EU mis-handling vaccine procurement) controversial reports of inefficacy and adverse effects as well as the high-profile European Commission–AstraZeneca COVID-19 vaccine dispute, have been a public relations disaster for both the EU and EU member states, and in the opinion of one academic has led to increased vaccine hesitancy.

In April 2021, the vaccine was a key component of the WHO backed COVAX (COVID-19 Vaccines Global Access) programme, with the WHO, the EMA, and the MHRA continuing to state that the benefits of the vaccine outweigh any possible side effects.

About 69 million doses of the Oxford–AstraZeneca COVID-19 vaccine were administered in the EU/EEA from authorisation to 26 June 2022.

In February 2024, AstraZeneca admits its Covid vaccine "can, in very rare cases, cause TTS (Thrombosis with thrombocytopenia syndrome)" in a legal document for first time.

=== Economics ===
Vaccine supply agreements by country
Country	Date	Doses
United Kingdom	17 May 2020 (Note: Contingent on completion of trials and efficacy, agreement finalised in August)	100 million
United States	21 May 2020	300 million
COVAX (WHO)	4 June 2020	300 million
COVAX (WHO)	29 September 2020	100 million
Egypt	22 June 2020	Unknown
Japan	8 August 2020	120 million
Australia	19 August 2020	25 million
European Union (Note: To be supplied to EU member countries and others in the European Economic Area. Preliminary negotiations were entered into by the Inclusive Vaccines Alliance composed of: France, Germany, Italy, and the Netherlands, before the EU elected to centrally negotiate for the block)	27 August 2020 (Note: A preliminary agreement with the abandoned four nation Inclusive Vaccine Alliance, of France, Italy, Germany and Netherlands, was agreed on 13 June 2020, before EU elected to centrally procure vaccines for all EU member states, and elective EEA states)	400 million
Canada	25 September 2020	20 million
Switzerland	16 October 2020	5.3 million
Bangladesh	5 November 2020	30 million
Thailand	27 November 2020	26 million
Philippines	27 November 2020	2.6 million
South Korea	1 December 2020	20 million
South Africa	7 January 2021	1 million (Note: Was to be followed by 500,000 at a later date. South Africa later suspended use the use of the vaccine before the rollout began and sold purchased supply to 14 African Union Members.)

Agreements for access to vaccines began being signed in May 2020, with the UK having priority for the first 100 million doses if trials proved successful, with the final agreement being signed at the end of August.

On 21 May 2020, AstraZeneca agreed to provide 300 million doses to the US for US$1.2 billion, implying a cost of US$4 per dose. An AstraZeneca spokesman said the funding also covers development and clinical testing. It also reached a technology transfer agreement with the Mexican and Argentinean governments and agreed to produce at least 400 million doses to be distributed throughout Latin America. The active ingredients would be produced in Argentina and sent to Mexico to be completed for distribution. In June 2020, Emergent BioSolutions signed a US$87 million deal to manufacture doses of the AstraZeneca vaccine specifically for the US market. The deal was part of the Trump administration's Operation Warp Speed initiative to develop and rapidly scale production of targeted vaccines before the end of 2020. Catalent would be responsible for the finishing and packaging process.

On 4 June 2020, the WHO's COVAX (COVID-19 Vaccines Global Access) facility made initial purchases of 300 million doses from the company for low- to middle-income countries. Also, AstraZeneca and Serum Institute of India reached a licensing agreement to independently supply 1 billion doses of the Oxford University vaccine to middle- and low-income countries, including India. Later in September, funded by a grant from the Bill and Melinda Gates Foundation, the COVAX programme secured an additional 100 million doses at US$3 per dose.

On 27 August 2020, AstraZeneca concluded an agreement with the EU, to supply up to 400 million doses to all EU and select European Economic Area (EEA) member states. The European Commission took over negotiations started by the Inclusive Vaccines Alliance, a group made up of France, Germany, Italy, and the Netherlands, in June 2020.

On 5 November 2020, a tripartite agreement was signed between the government of Bangladesh, the Serum Institute of India, and Beximco Pharma of Bangladesh. Under the agreement Bangladesh ordered 30 million doses of Oxford–AstraZeneca vaccine from Serum through Beximco for $4 per shot. On the other hand, Indian government has given 3.2 million doses to Bangladesh as a gift which were also produced by Serum. But Serum supplied only 7 million doses from the tripartite agreement in the first two months of the year. Bangladesh was supposed to receive 5 million doses per month but did not receive shipments in March and April. As a result, rollout of vaccine has been disrupted by supply shortfalls. The situation became complicated when the second dose of 1.3 million citizens is uncertain as India halts exports. Not getting the second dose at the right time is likely to reduce the effectiveness of the vaccination programme. In addition, several citizens of Bangladesh have expressed doubts about its effectiveness and safety. Bangladesh is looking for alternative vaccine sources because India isn't supplying the vaccine according to the timeline of the deal.

Thailand's agreement in November 2020 for 26 million doses of vaccine would cover 13 million people, approximately 20% of the population, with the first lot expected to be delivered at the end of May. The public health minister indicated the price paid was $5 per dose; AstraZeneca (Thailand) explained in January 2021 after a controversy that the price each country paid depended on production cost and differences in supply chain, including manufacturing capacity, labour and raw material costs. In January 2021, the Thai cabinet approved further talks on ordering another 35 million doses, and the Thai FDA approved the vaccine for emergency use for 1 year. Siam Bioscience, a company owned by Vajiralongkorn, will receive technological transfer and has the capacity to manufacture up to 200 million doses a year for export to ASEAN.

Also in November, the Philippines agreed to buy 2.6 million doses, reportedly worth around ₱700 million (approximately US$5.60 per dose). In December 2020, South Korea signed a contract with AstraZeneca to secure 20 million doses of its vaccine, reportedly equivalent in worth to those signed by Thailand and the Philippines, with the first shipment expected as early as January 2021. As of January 2021, the vaccine remains under review by the South Korea Disease Control and Prevention Agency. AstraZeneca signed a deal with South Korea's SK Bioscience to manufacture its vaccine products. The collaboration calls for the SK affiliate to manufacture AZD1222 for local and global markets.

On 7 January 2021, the South African government announced that they had secured an initial 1 million doses from the Serum Institute of India, to be followed by another 500,000 doses in February, however the South African government subsequently cancelled the use of the vaccine, selling its supply to other African countries, and switched its vaccination programme to use the Janssen COVID-19 vaccine.

On 22 January 2021, AstraZeneca announced that in the event the European Union approved the COVID-19 Vaccine AstraZeneca, initial supplies would be lower than expected due to production issues at Novasep in Belgium. Only 31 million of the previously predicted 80 million doses would be delivered to the EU by March 2021. In an interview with Italian newspaper La Repubblica, AstraZeneca's CEO Pascal Soriot said the delivery schedule for the doses in the EU was two months behind schedule. He mentioned low yield from cell cultures at one large-scale European site. Analysis published in The Guardian also identified an apparently low yield from bioreactors in the Belgium plant and noted the difficulties in setting up this form of process, with variable yields often occurring. As a result, the EU imposed export controls on vaccine doses; controversy erupted as to whether doses were being diverted to the UK and whether deliveries to Northern Ireland would be disrupted.

On 24 February 2021, a shipment of the vaccine to Accra, Ghana, via COVAX made it the first country in Africa to receive vaccines via the initiative.

In early 2021, the Bureau for Investigative Journalism found that South Africa had paid double the rate for the European Commission, while Uganda paid triple.

According to the Higher Education Statistics Agency data, Oxford received a US$176 million windfall on vaccine in the 2021–22 academic year.

=== Brand names ===
The vaccine is marketed under the brand name Covishield by the Serum Institute of India. The name of the vaccine was changed to Vaxzevria in the European Union on 25 March 2021. Vaxzevria, AstraZeneca COVID‐19 Vaccine, and COVID-19 Vaccine AstraZeneca are manufactured by AstraZeneca.

== Research ==
As of February 2021, the AZD1222 development team were working on adapting the vaccine to be more effective in relation to newer SARS-CoV-2 variants; redesigning the vaccine being the relatively quick process of switching the genetic sequence of the spike protein. Manufacturing set-up and a small scale trial are also required before the adapted vaccine might be available in autumn.
