= Respiratory compromise =

- Specialty: Pulmonology

Respiratory compromise describes a deterioration in respiratory function with a high likelihood of rapid progression to respiratory failure and death. Respiratory failure occurs when inadequate gas exchange by the respiratory system occurs, with a low oxygen level or a high carbon dioxide level.

== Causes ==
Patients in acute care hospitals, particularly those with respiratory conditions, are at risk of developing respiratory compromise. Respiratory failure requiring emergency mechanical ventilation occurs in over 40,000 patients per year in the United States. In postoperative patients in the United States, the National Surgical Quality Improvement Program reports that 1.03% of all surgical patients require an unplanned intubation postoperatively.

Although respiratory compromise may develop de novo during hospitalization in patients without preexisting lung disease, in other patients, it develops as a complication of chronic respiratory diseases, such as chronic obstructive pulmonary disease (COPD). Although respiratory failure is caused by a heterogeneous group of processes, there are subsets of patients who manifest similar physiologic patterns of deterioration

- Impaired control of breathing – e.g. opioid overdose
- Impaired airway protection – e.g. cerebrovascular accident (CVA)
- Parenchymal lung disease – e.g. Acute Respiratory Distress Syndrome (ARDS)
- Increased airway resistance – e.g. COPD exacerbation
- Hydrostatic pulmonary edema – e.g. left ventricular heart failure
- Right ventricular failure – e.g. acute pulmonary embolism

=== Risk factors ===
The term respiratory compromise is used to describe various intensities of respiratory dysfunction that can range from a chronic state of respiratory insufficiency to conditions that require emergency resuscitation and a breathing machine.

Risk factors include a variety of substances, conditions, and environments:

- Acute respiratory distress syndrome
- Age
- Asthma
- Care setting
- COPD
- COVID-19
- General anesthesia, opioids, and neuromuscular blocking agents
- Obesity
- Pneumonia and other respiratory infections
- Pulmonary fibrosis
- Sleep apnea

In addition to the lung deterioration observed for the various etiologies and mechanisms of respiratory compromise, severe respiratory compromise can have a concomitant impact on non-pulmonary systems of the body.

== Diagnosis ==
Central to implementing therapies to reverse or mitigate a state of respiratory compromise is an accurate diagnosis of the condition. Correctly diagnosing respiratory compromise requires a screening to determine the amount of gas in the patient's bloodstream. Two different tests are available for clinical diagnosis.

Testing and monitoring blood gas levels requires one of the following diagnostic procedures:

- Pulse oximetry

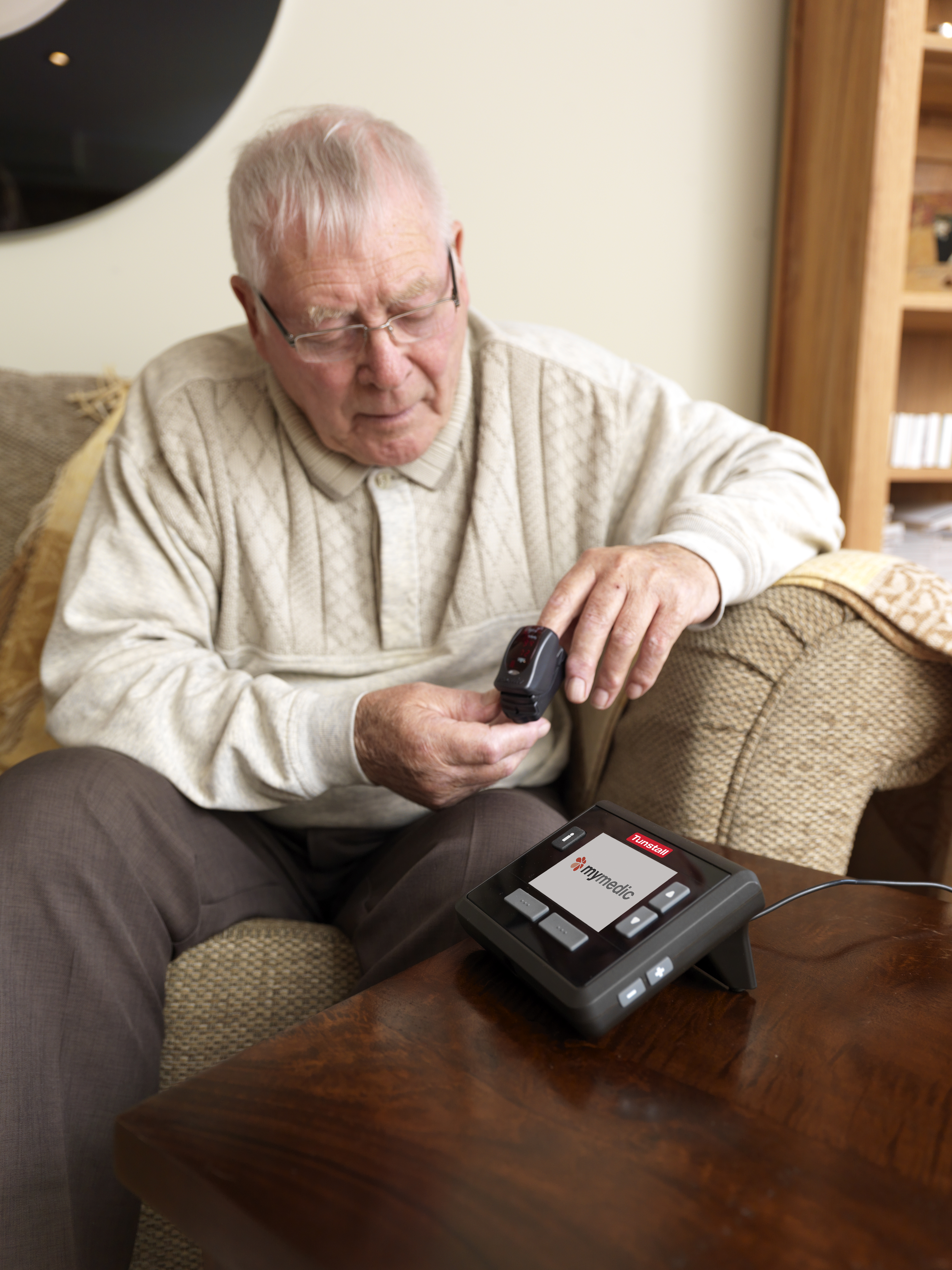
Pulse oximetry is a simple, quick, painless test.

For this test, a small sensor is attached to the patient's finger or ear. The sensor uses light to estimate how much oxygen is in the blood.

A pulse oximeter works by beaming red and infrared light through capillaries. The amount of red and infrared light transmitted provides an approximate measure of oxygen in the blood. The oximeter reading is based on the color of the blood: oxygenated blood is a brighter red than deoxygenated blood, which appears as bluish purple.

- Arterial blood gas test (ABG)

This test measures the precise levels of oxygen and carbon dioxide in the blood. A blood sample is drawn from an artery, typically in the wrist. A laboratory then processes the blood sample to determine oxygen and carbon dioxide levels.

Assessing and monitoring blood gas levels is the most accurate means to identify a state of respiratory compromise in patients. ABG testing does however require an arterial blood sample, which is more invasive and uncomfortable for patients than a pulse oximetry reading that uses a reading based on light and color.

=== Recognition and intervention ===
The importance of diagnosing respiratory compromise is that with earlier diagnosis and treatment progression to respiratory failure may be prevented. Enhanced monitoring techniques and specific therapies may prevent progression of respiratory compromise to respiratory failure and possible death.

== Prevention ==
Classifying acutely ill respiratory patients into one or more of these categories may help in determining appropriate screening and monitoring strategies that are most effective for the patient's particular pathophysiology. Although specific diagnostic and therapeutic interventions must be individualized, standardized screening and monitoring practices for patients with similar mechanisms of deterioration may enhance the ability to predict respiratory failure early and prevent its occurrence.

== Treatment ==
Therapy interventions for respiratory compromise target secondary effects of the condition, which manifest as pulmonary pathologies or aggravate existing pulmonary conditions. Appropriately administered antibiotic therapy can reduce the risk of mortality in patients with moderate to severe pneumonia, and timely ventilation therapy can reduce mortality in patients with a diagnosis of COPD.
