= European Commission–AstraZeneca COVID-19 vaccine dispute =

Dispute between the European Union and AstraZeneca

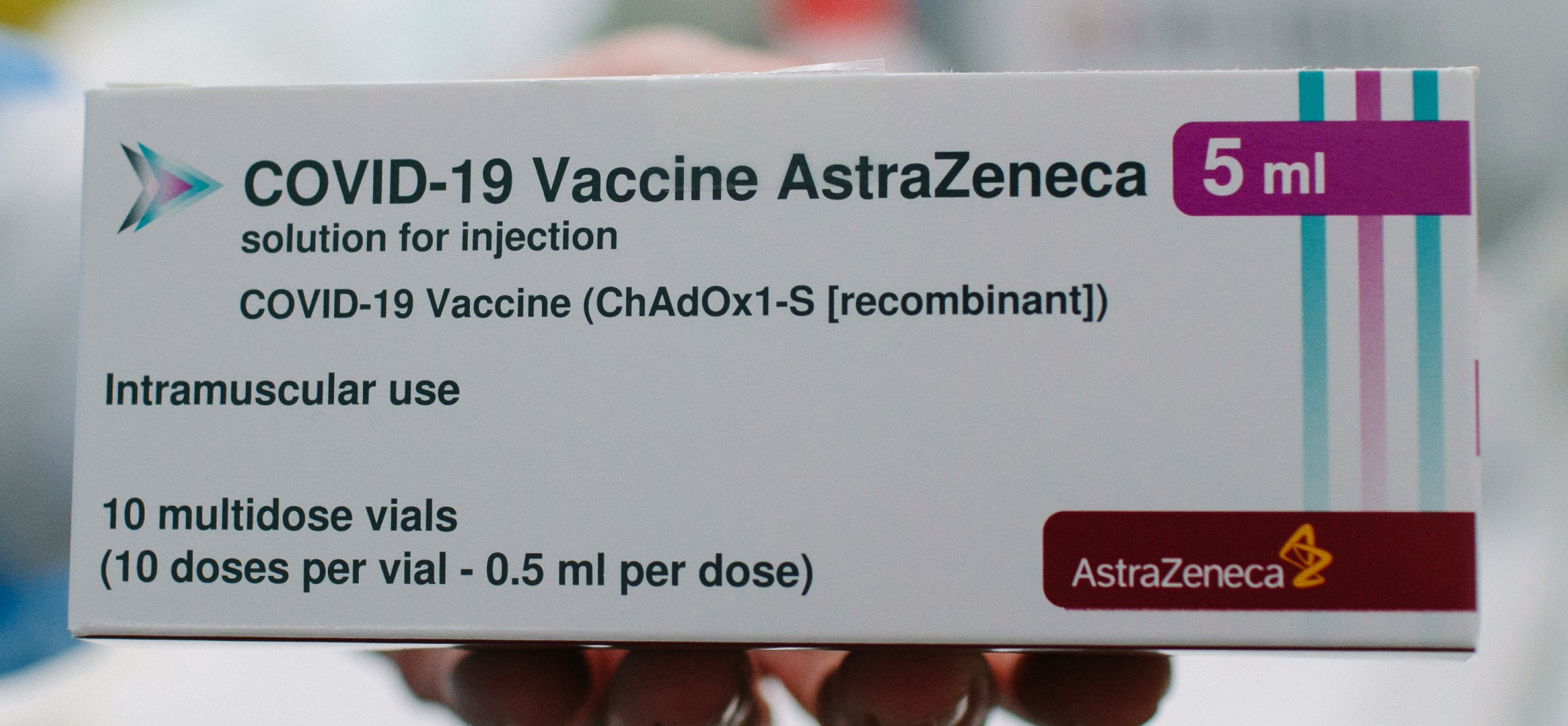
A packet of AstraZeneca COVID-19 vaccine vials

A dispute broke out in January 2021 between the European Commission and the pharmaceutical company AstraZeneca AB about the provision of COVID-19 vaccines during the COVID-19 pandemic, and, in February, spilled out into a dispute over Article 16 of the Northern Ireland Protocol. Vaccination proceeded apace in the UK but more slowly in the EU, and by the end of March 2021, over 30% of the UK population had received at least one dose of vaccine compared to about 8% of the EU population. This was partly due to limited availability of the AstraZeneca vaccine in the EU. The World Health Organization and the European Medicines Agency continued to state that the vaccine was safe and effective. However, a representative of the European Medicines Agency said in June that vaccines based on the mRNA technology should be preferred if available for all age groups, including for the over 60s.

== Background ==
In anticipation that a successful vaccine against COVID-19 would be developed, various countries pre-ordered doses of vaccine from the organisations doing research. The United Kingdom pre-ordered 100 million doses of the Oxford–AstraZeneca COVID-19 vaccine candidate by May 2020, through AstraZeneca UK Limited. While in parallel offering UK taxpayer-funded grants to vaccine manufacturers, in the UK and EU, to increase capacity, including approximately £21 million of UK funding for the Halix plant in the Netherlands, according to a report in the Daily Telegraph. in advance of the clinical trials of the Oxford vaccine candidate. The EU denied that the Halix plant had received any UK government funding. The US Government, and WHO COVAX programme placed similar conditional pre-orders, for 600 million doses of the Oxford vaccine candidate, in the following weeks, with the US administration offering $1.2 bn in funding for development, and clinical trials of the candidate. The EU made a 336 million euro downpayment to Astrazeneca in August to cover development, liability and other costs incurred by the vaccine maker. The Swedish subsidiary, AstraZeneca AB, reached a preliminary agreement, on 13 June, with the short lived Inclusive Vaccines Alliance, a group made up of France, Germany, Italy and the Netherlands, to supply up to 400 million doses for the club of four. This Inclusive Vaccine Alliance was meant as the first step towards a collaborative EU approach to vaccine procurement, and subsequently the national health ministers mandated the EU commission to take over. In the past, the European Union member states had decided on their own health policies, but during the summer of 2020, Brussels therefore took charge of vaccine procurement in what Ursula von der Leyen called a "European Health Union". Member states could opt out of this, from the centralised EU procurement process, but none initially did, except for Hungary. Negotiating on behalf of the whole EU, the European Commission signed a deal with AstraZeneca AB, on 27 August 2020.

The European Union was generally slow in signing their vaccine contracts because they were demanding producer liability if something goes wrong and wanted to conduct a rolling-review process (leading to ordinary regulatory approval) rather than an emergency authorisation. The priority of the European Medicines Agency and of the individual member states was not speed but to build public confidence in the safety of the vaccines and the mass vaccination process. However, the European governments conceded some immunity to AstraZeneca and to pay potential claims above an agreed limit, and this was different from the contract they made, for example, with EU-based Sanofi.

An analysis by Isaac and Deutsch in Politico Europe indicate the UK involvement began with a £65 million grant to Oxford University in April 2020 to develop a production plan for their vaccine which evolved into a binding agreement in May 2020 with AstraZeneca UK Limited. This agreement related to UK supply and became the basis for the formal UK contract signed on 28 August 2020, a day after the EU contract, with the Swedish subsidiary. The contract with the UK subsidiary differs from the EU Contract, with the Swedish subsidiary, in that the UK contract is under English law, rather than the Belgium law specified in the EU contract, and having more specific details on key points that relate to interruptions in UK supply. The two contracts with the EU and the UK both included ″best effort″ clauses.

When the Oxford–AstraZeneca vaccine was approved for use in the United Kingdom on 30 December 2020, vaccinations began to be rolled out. It was the second vaccine to enter the national rollout programme, joining the Pfizer–BioNTech vaccine which had been approved on 2 December 2020. AstraZeneca submitted its application for conditional marketing authorisation to the European Medicines Agency (EMA) on 12 January 2021, EMA subsequently approved the use of the Oxford–AstraZeneca vaccine on 29 January, joining the Pfizer vaccine, approved on 21 December 2020, and the Moderna vaccine on 6 January 2021. Hours earlier, French president Emmanuel Macron had stated that the Oxford–AstraZeneca vaccine was "quasi-ineffective for people over 65". EMA recommended its use for anyone from age 18, but cautioned that efficacy for over 55s was likely but remained unknown at the time. Some national regulators therefore restricted its use for the elderly. For example, the German Standing Committee on Vaccination (STIKO) did not recommend the use for over 65s at the time because AstraZeneca had not submitted data which showed efficacy for this age group, adding that ″when there is more and better data, STIKO will change its recommendation″. By the end of January, two per cent of the population of the European Union had received the first of the required two vaccines shots compared with around ten per cent in the United Kingdom. The UK decided to have an emergency approval rather than regular approval (which holds manufacturers to account should something go wrong) and to trust in just-in-time delivery rather than to stockpile second doses as most EU members states did, according to an analysis in Deutsche Welle. Most EU member states opted to provide the second dose at the earliest opportunity. They also wanted to avoid harmful rivalries between member states and a heterogeneous vaccination rate in order to minimise the risk of mutated strains adapting to the vaccine.

According to investigative research by Der Spiegel, the Oxford University developers first sought to collaborate with the US firm Merck because of its experience in vaccine production. However, because of US President Donald Trump's America First policies and the concern that any collaboration with a US company would mean that the US is served first, British health minister Matt Hancock intervened. While the UK was in the process of leaving the European Union, Hancock explained on radio station LBC that he did not want to sign a contract that would require the Oxford vaccine to be delivered to other countries before the UK. As a result, AstraZeneca became Oxford's partner in April 2020, even though AstraZeneca had no previous experience in vaccine research. Der Spiegel argued that this might explain why the regulatory agencies found flaws in the data submitted and why the company had underestimated the production difficulties and overstated their production capacities. AstraZeneca's CEO Pascal Soriot assured the Johnson government that it would supply a large share of the vaccine early and exclusively to the UK. In return, the British task force set up for vaccine procurement pledged the participation of hundreds of thousands of volunteers in clinical trials and the generous assumption of liability risks, an offer that no pharmaceutical company could turn down, according to Der Spiegel.

== January dispute ==
In the third week of January 2021, AstraZeneca announced that problems at the Belgian plant where it produced the vaccine would reduce the supply available to the European Union from the 80 million doses expected by the end of March, to 31 million doses. This news came at a time when Pfizer had also reduced the output of its vaccine to allow for an upgrade of its facilities. This left the European Union with a shortfall on its requirements. On 25 January, Stella Kyriakides, Europe's health commissioner, stated that discussions were taking place with AstraZeneca, but that the company had not given satisfactory answers as to which doses had been manufactured and to whom they had been delivered. The company responded by stating that its contract with the United Kingdom gave that nation the first claim to vaccines produced domestically, whereas its contract with the European Union only required it to make its "best reasonable efforts" to deliver the doses on time. The contract with the UK included multiple, similar "reasonable best efforts" clauses, for AstraZeneca UK Limited, and any sub-contractors employed. Both the EU and UK contracts were subsequently published. The EU commission also had AstraZeneca's Belgian plant inspected and found that this plant had produced all the doses it was obliged to under its contract with AstraZeneca.

The Northern Ireland Protocol of the Brexit deal guarantees free movement of goods on the border between Northern Ireland and the Republic of Ireland. On 29 January, the European Commission published a draft of its export transparency mechanism (a form of export control) to gain oversight of the movement of vaccines. This included reference to the possible use of Article 16 of the Northern Ireland Protocol in introducing export controls, to prevent supplies of vaccine aimed at the Republic of Ireland moving to the rest of the UK via Northern Ireland. Article 16 allows limited unilateral deviation from the Protocol, subject to various criteria being met. This move was criticised in Northern Ireland, the Republic of Ireland and the UK, with the first minister of Northern Ireland, Arlene Foster, stating it was "an absolutely incredible act of hostility". The EU reversed the decision the following day acknowledging that a mistake had been made.

However, the EU introduced export controls on coronavirus vaccines made inside the bloc. They had to be approved by national governments, unless they are destined for the Covax mechanism to supply the poorest countries or for a number of European states not in the EU. The World Health Organization criticised this move as likely to prolong the pandemic and slow economic recovery around the world. The European Union's chief Brexit negotiator, Michel Barnier, asked the Commission to step back from the deepening row.

Later, on 29 January, the UK was left off a list of 120 countries to which vaccines could be exported freely. Instead, manufacturers in the EU must notify national authorities before exporting vaccines to any country not on the list. The authorities have the right to refuse to allow the export if they consider that doing so would jeopardise the supply of vaccines to the EU. The new measures meant that vaccines from AstraZeneca plants in the EU might be prevented from being exported to the UK. This mechanism raised fears that Pfizer-Biontech, which also makes vaccines in the EU, might be at risk of export bans if there are supply problems.

In implementing this transparency and authorisation mechanism, the EU commission argued that the mechanism was fully consistent with the EU's international commitments under the World Trade Organization and the G20 and that the EU had helped fund upfront costs of all vaccines covered under this mechanism. The EU was also the only major country or bloc (represented in the OECD) that exported vaccines on a large scale to numerous third countries. Member states were asked to consider reciprocity and proportionality, i.e. whether the destination country restricted its own exports of vaccines either by law or other means or whether the epidemiological situation there was better or worse than in the EU. Public pressure had been growing at the end of 2020, particularly in Germany where some politicians argued that the first vaccine approved against Covid (the Biontech vaccine) was actually invented in Germany, but distributed primarily in the US, Israel and the UK, although Biontech had received German government funding. The EU commission also argued that the pandemic situation was in line with article 122 of the Treaty on the Functioning of the European Union which entitles the EU, in line with international law, to take all measures necessary when "seriously threatened with severe difficulties caused by natural disasters or exceptional occurrences".

The WTO criticised the implementation of export controls on vaccines by the EU with WHO assistant director Mariangela Simao describing it as a "very worrying trend" and WHO director Tedros Adhanom stating it could prolong the pandemic. By November 2020, the WTO reported that 88 member states in total had invoked similar clauses to either restrict or facilitate the export of medical supplies in connection with the COVID-19-crisis, and over 70 WTO member states currently had measures in place to restrict exports of medicaments, medical supplies or food. The US had invoked the Defense Production Act of 1950 to de facto ban any vaccine exports. According to the WTO the United Kingdom has in place restrictions only on the export of certain COVID-19 medications and on personal protective equipment, in the EU personal protective equipment is subject to export authorisation. Nevertheless, in February the WTO urged the UK to donate vaccines to developing countries now rather than to wait until it has a surplus of doses, in order to help in the global fight against the pandemic.

Also, on 29 January, the European Commission released a redacted version of the bloc's contract with AstraZeneca. The redacted portions included those covering prices, delivery dates and intellectual property rights. The Commission claimed the contract made it "crystal clear" that AstraZeneca had to supply vaccine produced in the UK to make up for the production shortfall at its EU plants but the firm disputed this, citing the best efforts clause. Article 5.4 of the contract stated that Astra-Zeneca should use "best reasonable efforts" to manufacture the vaccine for the EU at sites in the EU and the UK, but that other sites could also be used to accelerate supply to the EU. The contract included agreed delivery amounts and dates. It also included a statement in Article 13.1.e that Astra-Zeneca was not under any obligation to another party, contractual or otherwise, that would impede its complete fulfillment of its obligations under the contract with the EU. Any legal proceedings would take place in Belgian courts.

On 31 January 2021, Ursula von der Leyen announced by Twitter that a "step forward" had been made in negotiations between AstraZeneca and the EU. The company committed to delivering a further 9 million doses of vaccine by March 2021, and would be expanding manufacturing capacity in Europe. They also stated that deliveries would start being made around a week earlier than previously promised. Meanwhile, the European Union had been having other vaccine procurement problems; a 25% shortfall it the number of jabs, from the US biotech firm Moderna, and major shortfalls in the distribution of the Pfizer–BioNTech vaccine.

In a speech to the European Parliament on 11 February 2021, Ursula von der Leyen maintained that when the European Commission took over responsibility for the rollout of the vaccine programme across the EU, this was the right thing to do. She admitted underestimating the difficulties of mass production of vaccines, and stated that the EU vaccination rollout was "still not where we want to be". She also stated that she "deeply regretted" the threat that had been made by the EU to restrict the flow of vaccine between the Republic of Ireland and Northern Ireland.

== March export blocks and halting of vaccinations ==
=== Demand and deliveries ===
By the beginning of March, rollout of the vaccination programme in the EU had been fraught with difficulties, especially with regard to the AstraZeneca vaccine. Reports of side effects in health workers receiving the AstraZeneca vaccine led to bad publicity in Germany. By 18 March public confidence in the vaccine in EU member nations fell dramatically, with a YouGov survey finding 55% of Germans and 61% of French people regarding the AstraZeneca vaccine as unsafe. The confidence in other vaccines was unaffected and the vast majority of Britons continued to regard the AstraZeneca vaccine as safe. Despite this, demand for the AstraZeneca vaccine was very high, for example, in Germany by early April. Still in mid May, when this vaccine was offered to all age groups and the span of time between the two doses may be reduced from 12 to 4 weeks, demand for the AstraZeneca vaccine by far exceeded availability in Germany. In early March, over 30% of the UK population had been vaccinated compared to about 8% of the EU population. After AstraZeneca supplied new data which for the first time showed efficacy for over 65s, Thomas Mertens, chairman of Germany's Standing Committee on Vaccination, stated that "the whole thing has somehow gone badly" while affirming that the AstraZeneca vaccine was "very good". AstraZeneca had contracted to supply 120 million doses in the first quarter, but had actually delivered less than 30 million doses. In mid April, the EU had distributed 133 million doses (all home-made) among its member states, but exported 170 million doses world-wide, including 16.2 million doses to the UK alone since the end of January.

On 4 March, Italy became the first EU country to block exports of the AstraZeneca vaccine. It refused the company permission to export 250,000 doses from its Rome plant to meet a contract with the Australian government. The European Commission accepted the Italian export block and the Australian government has asked for a formal review of the decision. The export was to form part of a batch of vaccines intended to be used while Australian production was set-up.

By early March, several EEC member countries had become frustrated by the shortage of vaccine supplies arranged by the European Commission, and began to look for alternative sources of supply. Austria, the Czech Republic, Denmark, Poland and Slovakia joined Hungary in sidetracking the EU's common approach by obtaining the Sputnik V vaccine from Russia, and supplies of vaccines from China. EMA had started its rolling review of Sputnik V already in early March, but the EU's vaccine chief Thierry Breton raised doubts that Sputnik V will be available in time to boost the European vaccine procurement which was expected to provide enough doses for 70% of the population by the end of June. Nevertheless, Russian pharmaceutical firm R-Pharm expects to produce up to 10 million doses monthly of the Sputnik V vaccine against COVID-19 at its plant in Bavaria, southern Germany, in the second half of 2021.

On 9 March, Charles Michel, the President of the European Council, accused the UK of banning the export of COVID-19 vaccines stating "The United Kingdom and the United States have imposed an outright ban on the export of vaccines or vaccine components produced on their territory". This statement was fervently denied by Boris Johnson, the UK prime minister, who denied that the government had blocked sales of vaccines to other countries. At the time, publicly available information suggested vaccines had not been exported from the UK either to the EU or within the international equitable-access initiative COVAX, and British officials declined to comment. However, Boris Johnson said to the Irish prime minister Micheál Martin that he wants to prioritise his people and that "until then he won't be in a position to give vaccines to anybody". Still on 27 April, when India was faced with a particularly bad pandemic situation, the British government said that the UK had no surplus vaccine doses at the time and was prioritising vaccinating its own population.

=== Safety issues ===
In mid-March, national medical regulators of thirteen member states of the EU, including Germany, France, Italy, Spain, Cyprus, Latvia and Lithuania, joined several other countries around the world and suspended using the AstraZeneca vaccine after reports of blood clots in some recipients. For example, by the end of March Germany reported 31 cases of very rare Cerebral venous sinus thrombosis, primarily in under 55s, after 2.7 million doses of the AstraZeneca vaccine had been administered, and a case fatality for this condition of up to 40%, causing Canada to suspend the use of this vaccine as well. The company, UK regulators and the European Medicines Agency stated that the vaccine was safe and there was no evidence of an increased risk of blood clots among recipients. Following this, Germany, France and others continued the use of the AstraZeneca vaccine. Other EU member states (primarily those in Eastern Europe, such as Poland) declared they will not suspend AZ vaccinations as "the benefit of taking the vaccine is incomparably greater than the potential so-called post-vaccination symptoms". In an opinion piece, a Times journalist criticised the approach of countries that suspended vaccinations quoting "precautionary principle" as "focusing on completely wrong risk". German health minister Jens Spahn defended the decision, saying that this was "based on facts, not politics" and meant to enhance confidence in the vaccination program in order to ensure as many citizens as possible will eventually consent to get vaccinated and so to return to normality for good.

=== Allegations of unused stockpiles and response ===
These reports of dangerous blood clots led to large falls in public confidence in the vaccine across the EU; in France some 61% of the population believed the AstraZeneca vaccine was unsafe, an increase of 18% from before the row. Similar decreases in confidence were seen in Italy and Spain. This contrasted with the UK where confidence in the vaccine remained high, with just 9% believing it unsafe, a rise of 4%. The British Medical Journal reported that the effects of the row over safety were likely to cause a long-lasting reduction in the willingness of people living in the EU to take the vaccine. On 17 March the European Commission accused some member states of stockpiling vaccine doses in the aftermath of the safety row, according to The Daily Telegraph. This refers to a virtual summit on 16 March when EU health commissioner Kyriakides said that "we urge Member States to use all available doses" and that member states are fully in their right to suspend AstraZeneca vaccinations while the EMA investigation into the rare blood clots was still ongoing. Germany's biggest state, North Rhine-Westphalia called media reports on unused stockpiles "fake news". Stockpiles of AstraZeneca doses were particularly small because much fewer doses than expected had been delivered. On 24 March, the state with a population of roughly 18 million had 549,354 doses of the Biontech vaccine, 142,360 doses of the Moderna vaccine, and 107,320 doses of the AstraZeneca vaccine in store. These AstraZeneca doses were reserved for appointments up to Sunday, 28 March (before new deliveries were expected). Second shots of AstraZeneca doses were not kept on stock. Not a single dose of any brand was left unused. The recommendation of Germany's federal Ministry of Health from 15 February was to keep 50% of the Moderna doses and 25% of Biontech/Pfizer on stock and most states followed this advice until the federal Ministry changed its recommendation on 24 March.

=== Dispute over unregistered stockpiles ===
On 20 March, the European Commission asked the Italian government to verify some unreported batches of vaccine at an AstraZeneca filling plant near Rome. EU sources told journalists that they thought the plant was filling vaccine vials for export for the UK, against an Italian export ban. The Carabinieri raided the plant over the following days and found 29 million doses. AstraZeneca said that 13 million doses were due for export to the Covax scheme (which is part funded by the UK and EU) to supply vaccines to low-income countries and the remaining 16 million were due for export to the EU in March and April. Those 29 million doses were roughly twice as many as the EU had received from AstraZeneca by that time. As reported by La Stampa, there was suspicion that AstraZeneca had deliberately delayed their request for regulatory approval of their own Anagni-based fill-finish plant in order to avoid EU-registration and with the possible intention to divert part of the stockpile to the UK.

On 21 March, Ursula von der Leyen had announced that the EU might ban AstraZeneca shipments from the EU to the UK unless AstraZeneca fulfill their contractual obligation first. According to a Guardian analysis, an export ban has the potential to delay the British vaccination programme by two months and speed up the EU vaccination programme by one week. The British government stated that the plant at the centre of the row, at Halix in the Netherlands was under contractual obligations to supply the UK and did not have regulatory approval to supply EU states. British prime minister Boris Johnson was said to be discussing the matter with EU leaders in an attempt to prevent an export ban. A Pfizer source told the Daily Telegraph that Pfizer had told the EU commission that lipid nanoparticles, a vital component for the Pfizer–BioNTech vaccine, are manufactured by Croda International at its factory at Snaith, North Yorkshire, and if the UK was to retaliate, production of the Pfizer-Biontech vaccine would halt within weeks. Around March, Germany-based companies Merck and Evonik had started to supply Biontech with these lipid nanoparticles or extended their previous deliveries. At a summit on 25 March, European leaders stopped short of banning the export of vaccines in connection with the AstraZeneca row. Ursula von der Leyen told AstraZeneca that they needed to honour their contract with the EU before they could export vaccines. Nevertheless, the EU continued to contribute AstraZeneca doses made in the EU to the COVAX scheme. In her government declaration from 25 March, German chancellor Angela Merkel stressed that Europe needed to produce vaccines independently from third countries because the UK was only producing for the UK and the US did not export any vaccines either.

UK-EU discussions were held in late March over stockpiles at a plant producing AstraZeneca vaccines in Leiden, the Netherlands. Vaccines produced at the plant could not be used until the EU regulator granted approval for distribution of the site on 26 March 2021, two days after AstraZeneca submitted their approval request.

Lower than expected yields at British plants in Oxford and Staffordshire and a temporary ban on exports from India led the UK to look for supplies from Leiden, which was included as a supplier in its contract with AstraZeneca. The EU has the power to block such an export under its January regulations. The Leiden plant has the capacity to produce around 5 million doses per month. In negotiations from 23 March progress was made but there were sticking points over the proportion of output to go to each party. The UK wanted a 50–50 split whereas the EU wanted a split based on relative population. The EU's internal market commissioner, Thierry Breton, stated on 1 April that there would be no export of the AstraZeneca vaccine to the UK until the company had met its commitment to the EU.

== April global restrictions and legal dispute ==
On 7 April, following further review of the data, the EMA concluded that unusual blood clots with low blood platelets should be listed as very rare side effects of the AstraZeneca vaccine. EMA recommended that EU member states should take into account their pandemic situation and vaccine availability in their decisions on the further use of the AstraZeneca vaccine National regulators, such as Germany's Paul Ehrlich Institute had previously come to the same conclusion after the AstraZeneca rollout continued. Germany had stopped administering the vaccine to under 60s by 31 March.

On 8 April, the UK health minister Matt Hancock advised that people aged between 18 and 29 should be offered a different vaccine, stating that the UK had more than enough alternatives. In total, the UK has ordered 40 million doses of the Pfizer-Biontech vaccine and 17 million of the Moderna vaccine, the two brands approved at the time (enough for up to 28.5 m people). Several EU member states had also restricted the use of the AstraZeneca jab, in Germany to those over 60, in France to over 55s, and Spain to over 65s. The Medicines and Healthcare products Regulatory Agency in the United Kingdom had stated on 1 April that it had received 22 reports of cerebral venous sinus thrombosis as well as 8 reports of other thrombosis events associated with low blood platelet counts; these had resulted in seven fatalities in the UK out of the 18.1 million people who had received the AstraZeneca jab so far. Previously the agency had only reported 5 cases of rare brain blood clots. This figure rose to 168 cases of these rare blood clots and 32 deaths up to 14 April after 21.2 million people had received a shot in the UK. Non-European countries also either temporarily or permanently banned or restricted the use of AstraZeneca, or cancelled orders. Examples include Australia, the Philippines, the African Union, and South Africa, while in the USA government vaccine advisers said they didn't foresee AstraZeneca being used there in future. Many member states of the European Union offered the AstraZeneca jab to those interested ahead of the usual priorisation scheme and so sped up their rollout. For example, the minister-president of Bavaria, Markus Söder, said that "everyone who dares", including those under 60, should be able to receive this jab as soon as possible. On 16 April (after the Netherlands banned AstraZeneca outright on the national level) doctors from a Zuyderland hospital in Netherlands published an open letter to the Dutch minister of health, criticising the press for their role in the poor reputation of the vaccine and arguing for voluntary vaccination on the basis of informed consent. The letter was accompanied by an X-ray of heavily damaged lungs of a patient who rejected vaccination under influence of the negative press coverage, and soon after contracted COVID-19 in a heavy form.

On 21 April, an EU official said it will not take up options for additional doses under the existing AstraZeneca and J&J (viral vector based vaccine) contracts, with a European Commission spokesman saying options could be exercised at any time but declining further comments. The EU official said discussions were ongoing with AstraZeneca and J&J with regards to "booster" jabs and with regards to vaccines in relation to new variants of COVID-19. The EU commission had the previous week said that it had started talks with Pfizer-Biontech on up to 1.8 billion doses for 2022 and 2023 on the basis of a monthly supply contract for its mRNA vaccine, this being in addition to the existing 600m Biontech-Pfizer and 310m Moderna doses on order for 2021. On 26 April, the EU Commission launched legal action against AstraZeneca for breach of contract. The EU Commission said on 9 May that it had no current plans to renew their order with AstraZeneca beyond June when the current contract expired. The new agreement with Pfizer-Biontech included provisions that all essential components are sourced within the EU.

On 18 June, the EU and AstraZeneca both claimed victory with the European Commission saying "This decision confirms the position of the Commission: AstraZeneca did not live up to the commitments it made in the contract" and AstraZeneca "court acknowledged that the difficulties experienced by AstraZeneca in this unprecedented situation had a substantial impact on the delay". A further court ruling is expected in September on whether AstraZeneca has fulfilled this agreement.
