= Major Diagnostic Category =

Categories of medical diagnoses into 25 diagnosis areas

The Major Diagnostic Categories (MDC) are formed by dividing all possible principal diagnoses (from ICD-9-CM) into 25 mutually exclusive diagnosis areas. MDC codes, like diagnosis-related group (DRG) codes, are primarily a claims and administrative data element unique to the United States medical care reimbursement system. DRG codes also are mapped, or grouped, into MDC codes.

The diagnoses in each MDC correspond to a single organ system or cause and, in general, are associated with a particular medical specialty. MDC 1 to MDC 23 are grouped according to principal diagnoses. Patients are assigned to MDC 24 (Multiple Significant Trauma) with at least two significant trauma diagnosis codes (either as principal or secondaries) from different body site categories. Patients assigned to MDC 25 (HIV Infections) must have a principal diagnosis of an HIV Infection or a principal diagnosis of a significant HIV related condition and a secondary diagnosis of an HIV Infection.

MDC 0, unlike the others, can be reached from a number of diagnosis/procedure situations, all related to transplants. This is due to the expense involved for the transplants so designated and because these transplants can be needed for a number of reasons which do not all come from one diagnosis domain. DRGs which reach MDC 0 are assigned to the MDC for the principal diagnosis instead of to the MDC associated with the designated DRG.

== List of Major Diagnostic Categories ==
MDC	Description	MS-DRG
0	Pre-MDC	001 - 017
1	Diseases and Disorders of the Nervous System	020 - 103
2	Diseases and Disorders of the Eye	113 - 125
3	Diseases and Disorders of the Ear, Nose, Mouth And Throat	129 - 159
4	Diseases and Disorders of the Respiratory System	163 - 208
5	Diseases and Disorders of the Circulatory System	215 - 316
6	Diseases and Disorders of the Digestive System	326 - 395
7	Diseases and Disorders of the Hepatobiliary System And Pancreas	405 - 446
8	Diseases and Disorders of the Musculoskeletal System And Connective Tissue	453 - 566
9	Diseases and Disorders of the Skin, Subcutaneous Tissue And Breast	573 - 607
10	Diseases and Disorders of the Endocrine, Nutritional And Metabolic System	614 - 645
11	Diseases and Disorders of the Kidney And Urinary Tract	652 - 700
12	Diseases and Disorders of the Male Reproductive System	707 - 730
13	Diseases and Disorders of the Female Reproductive System	734 - 761
14	Pregnancy, Childbirth And Puerperium	765 - 782
15	Newborn And Other Neonates (Perinatal Period)	789 - 795
16	Diseases and Disorders of the Blood and Blood Forming Organs and Immunological Disorders	799 - 816
17	Myeloproliferative DDs (Poorly Differentiated Neoplasms)	820 - 849
18	Infectious and Parasitic DDs (Systemic or unspecified sites)	853 - 872
19	Mental Diseases and Disorders	876 - 887
20	Alcohol/Drug Use or Induced Mental Disorders	894 - 897
21	Injuries, Poison And Toxic Effect of Drugs	901 - 923
22	Burns	927 - 935
23	Factors Influencing Health Status and Other Contacts with Health Services	939 - 951
24	Multiple Significant Trauma	955 - 965
25	Human Immunodeficiency Virus Infection	969 - 977
	MDC Category Missing	981 - 989; 998,999

== See also ==
- Diagnosis-related group
- Diagnosis code
- Medical classification
