= John D. Thompson =

John Devereaux Thompson
- Born: 6 August 1917; Franklin, Pennsylvania
- Died: 13 August 1992 (aged 75); New Haven, Connecticut
- Occupation: Professor

John Devereaux Thompson, R.N., M.S. (6 August 1917 – 13 August 1992) was a nurse and professor at the Yale School of Public Health who co-invented the diagnosis-related groups (DRGs) that provided a basis for changing the system for hospital payment.

The Yale School of Public Health currently awards an annual health management and policy research grant to top Graduate students in Public Health under the name, and recognition of, John D. Thompson.
