= Healthcare Resource Group =

Within the English National Health Service (NHS), a Healthcare Resource Group (HRG) is a grouping consisting of patient events that have been judged to consume a similar level of resource. For example, there are a number of different knee-related procedures that all require similar levels of resource; they may all be assigned to one HRG.

The current revision of Healthcare Resource Groups in use is the fourth, and is known as HRG4. HRG4 is updated annually to enhance the system, reflect changes in clinical practice and to include changes to policy.

HRG4 is maintained by the National Casemix Office, part of NHS Digital.

The HRG system is used by Payment by Results, an activity based payment system rolled out in the NHS in England (but not Wales) from 2004 and used to determine the income hospitals in England get for given hospital stays and procedures.

HRGs can be derived for the following areas:

- Admitted Patient Care
- Non-Admitted Consultations
- Emergency Medicine
- Adult Critical Care
- Paediatric Critical Care
- Neonatal Critical Care
- Renal

Patient data are assigned HRG codes using a software application known as a Grouper.

An HRG code consists of five characters: two letters followed by two numbers and a final letter. The first letter refers the Chapter, the second being the Sub-Chapter; these correspond to body areas or body systems identifying the area of clinical care that the HRG falls within. The final letter is known as the 'split' and is used, for example, to indicate the level of complications and comorbidities associated with the HRG (e.g. Minor, Intermediate and Major), for different lengths of stay, ages or a combination of factors.

== Admitted Patient Care ==
In Admitted Patient Care, an HRG is derived for each Consultant Episode (a period of care under one consultant) and Provider Hospital Spell (a period of care from admission to discharge) using clinical coding (ICD-10 and OPCS-4) and administrative codes about patient events.

== Non-Admitted Consultations ==
Non-admitted consultations includes outpatients and ward attenders. An HRG is derived for each attendance record using clinical coding and the 'First Attendance' data item.

== Emergency Medicine ==
Emergency Medicine (A&E) data are grouped based on investigation and treatment codes.

== Adult Critical Care ==
Adult Critical Care HRGs are allocated per Critical Care Period using a count of organ systems supported.

== Paediatric Critical Care ==
Paediatric Critical Care HRGs are allocated on a per-day basis largely using Critical Care Activity Codes.

== Neonatal Critical Care ==
Neonatal Critical Care HRGs are allocated on a per-day basis largely using Critical Care Activity Codes.

== Renal ==
Renal HRGs are allocated based on the National Renal Dataset

== See also ==
- Diagnosis Related Group
