= ChAdOx1 =

Adenoviral vector for vaccines

ChAdOx1 is an adenoviral vector for vaccines that was developed by the Jenner Institute, University of Oxford. The vector is a chimpanzee adenovirus modified to avoid its replication.

Adenoviruses are effective vectors for inducing and boosting cellular immunity to encoded recombinant antigens. However, the widespread seroprevalence of neutralizing antibodies to common human adenovirus serotypes limits their use. Simian adenoviruses do not suffer from the same disadvantages. Therefore, investigators have tested new vaccines using the chimp adenovirus ChAdOx1 as a vector. For example, a vaccine for influenza infection was designed using the vector expressing influenza antigens, nucleoprotein (NP), and matrix protein 1 (M1), creating a vaccine candidate named ChAdOx1 NP+M1.

== Virology ==
ChAdOx1 has been derived from a chimpanzee adenovirus (ChAd) serotype Y25 engineered by λ red recombination to exchange the native E4 orf4, orf6 and orf6/7 genes for those from human adenovirus HAdV-C5. Serotype Y25 belongs to the species Mastadenovirus exoticum of genus Mastadenovirus.

== Clinical trials ==
It has been demonstrated that the adenoviridae vector ChAdOx1 can be used to make vaccinations that are protective against Middle East Respiratory Syndrome (MERS) in mice and able to induce immune response against MERS in humans.

The vector was also used to create a vaccine against Nipah which was effective in hamsters (but never proven in humans), in addition to a potential vaccine for Rift Valley Fever that was protective in sheep, goats, and cattle (but not proven in humans).

The adenovirus expressing the antigen 85A (ChAdOx1 85A), is used as vector for a tuberculosis vaccine candidate.

In 2017, the ChAdOx1 vector was used in a trial for a vaccine candidate against human malaria infection. The researchers studied two candidate vaccines ChAdOx1 LS2 along with MVA LS2. The former, encoding a malaria liver-stage dual antigen LS2 (LSA1 and LSAP2) fused with the transmembrane domain from shark invariant chain. And the latter, a Modified Vaccinia Ankara (MVA) vector encoding the LS2 fused to the C-terminal end of the leader sequence of tPA. The trial reached the phase I/IIa.

There are also investigation lines that use the vector for vaccines against the Zika virus (ChAdOx1 ZIKV) and the Chikungunya virus (ChAdOx1 sCHIKV).

The ChAdOx1 vector has been used as a platform for a vaccine against coronavirus disease since the beginning of the COVID-19 pandemic. Sarah Gilbert leads the work on this vaccine candidate alongside Andrew Pollard, Teresa Lambe, Sandy Douglas, Catherine Green and Adrian Hill. The COVID-19 vaccine, known now as ChAdOx1 nCoV-19 or AZD1222, makes use of this vector, which stimulates an immune response against the coronavirus spike protein. Animal studies began in March 2020, and recruitment of 510 human participants for a phase I/II trial began on 27 March, and the results were presented in October. On 30 December 2020, the vaccine was approved for use in the UK's vaccination programme.
