= Risk of mortality =

Medical assessment

The risk of mortality (ROM) provides a medical classification to estimate the likelihood of in-hospital death for a patient. The ROM classes are minor, moderate, major, and extreme. The ROM class is used for the evaluation of patient mortality.

== See also ==
- Case mix index
- Diagnosis codes
- Severity of illness
