= Annealed pyrolytic graphite =

Annealed Pyrolytic Graphite (APG), also known as Thermally Annealed Pyrolytic Graphite (TPG), is a form of synthetic graphite that offers excellent in-plane thermal conductivity. As with pyrolytic carbon or pyrolytic graphite (PG), APG is also low in mass, is electrically conductive, and offers diamagnetic properties that allow it to levitate in magnetic fields.

== Physical Properties ==
APG is an anisotropic material with extremely high in-plane thermal conductivity (1,700 W/m-K at room temperature) and low through-thickness conductivity. Its laminate structure remains stable across a wide temperature range allowing it to be used in a variety of heat transfer applications. APG's conductivity generally increases as the temperature decreases, peaking at 2,800 W/m-K at approximately 150 K. Unlike pyrolytic graphite, the x-y planar conductivity is consistent across each basal plane, thus the conductivity in the center planes is consistent with the outer planes. The in-plane covalently bonded carbon atoms in a hexagonal geometry account for APG's high in-plane thermal conductivity and its high in-plane stiffness. Through its thickness, these hexagonal planes are weakly bonded (van der Waals bonds) resulting in a material with poor through-thickness thermal conductivity, stiffness, and strength.

== Synthesis ==
APG is produced in a process similar method to Highly Oriented Pyrolytic Graphite (HOPG), where hydrocarbon gas is heated until it breaks down into carbon. Pyrolytic graphite (PG) is then grown on plates using a chemical vapor deposition (CVD) process. The PG is then annealed at high temperature to form the more planar and more uniform carbon structure of APG, described above. The primary difference between the HOPG and APG synthesis methods is that the APG annealing process does not require the use of induced stresses, resulting in a more affordable and practical bulk material for production use.

== Applications ==
APG is primarily used as a heat spreader for the thermal management of high-end electronics. Due to its poor mechanical properties APG is typically encapsulated in structural metallic materials. Aluminum is the most commonly chosen encapsulant for its strength, low mass, cost, manufacturability, and thermal conductivity. Since APG's conductivity is much lower through its thickness, thermal vias are sometimes inserted into the assembly to transfer heat into the graphite, as shown in Figure 1. These vias are typically composed of aluminum or copper. Thin, flexible sheets of APG can be encapsulated in thin flexible materials, such as polymers, aluminum foil, or copper foil to create what is known as a Thermal Strap.

Aerospace: Aluminum-APG plates are most commonly used as heat spreader plates to transfer heat away from high power density electronics in aircraft and spacecraft.

Scientific Cameras: Cu-APG plates are used to cool and isothermalize CCD detectors at cryogenic temperatures.

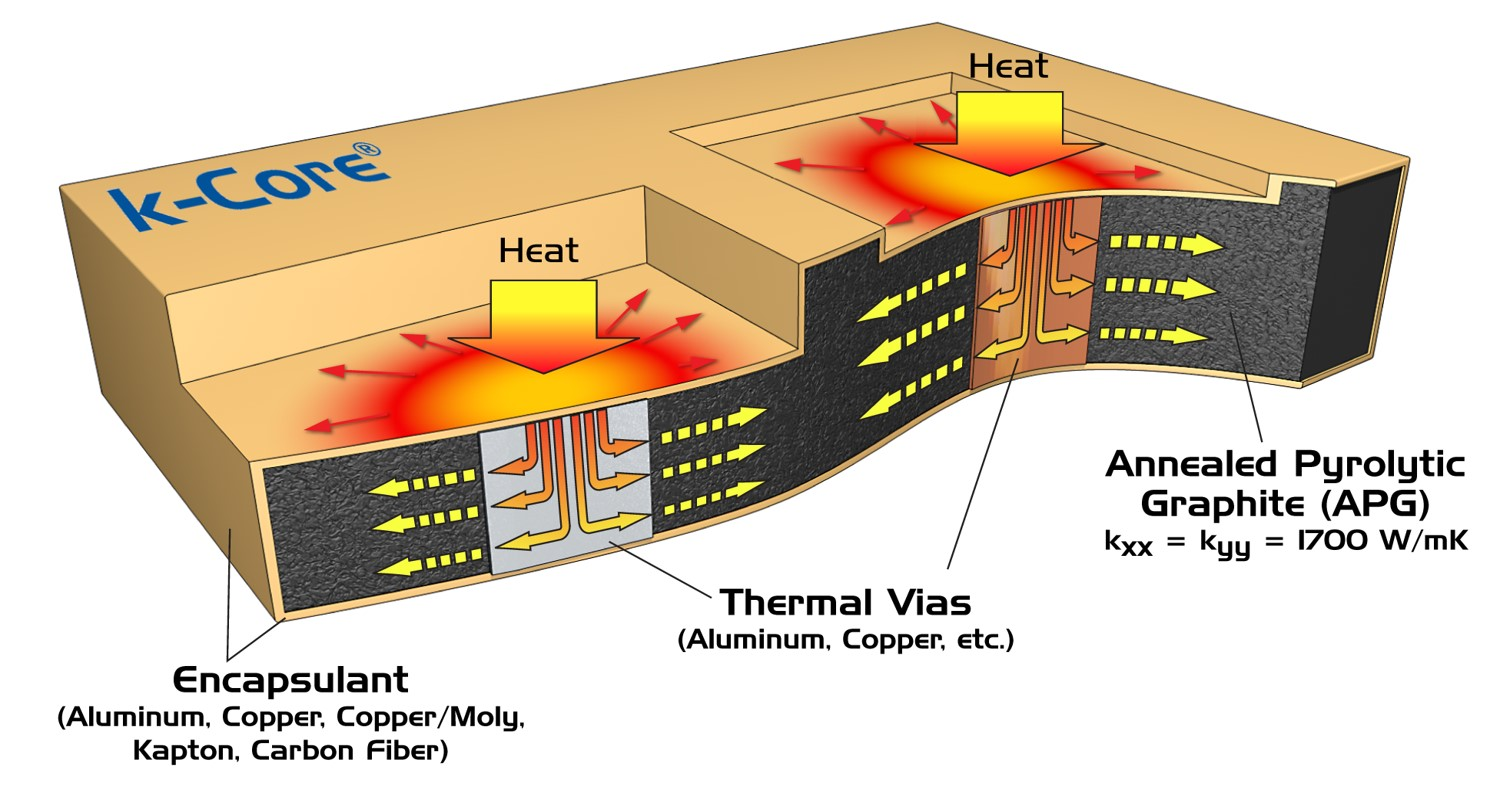
Figure 1. This illustration is an example of a heat spreader that is composed of APG encapsulated in copper plates, with aluminum and copper thermal vias
