= Case mix index =

Relative value assigned to a diagnosis-related group of patients

Case mix index (CMI) within health care and medicine, is a relative value assigned to a diagnosis-related group of patients in a medical care environment. The CMI value is used in determining the allocation of resources to care for and/or treat the patients in the group.

== Resource Use Groups ==
Patients are classified into groups having the same condition (based on main and secondary diagnosis, procedures, age), complexity (comorbidity) and needs. These groups are known as Diagnosis Related Groups (DRG), or Resource Use Groups (RUG).

Each DRG has a relative average value assigned to it that indicates the amount of resources required to treat patients in the group, as compared to all the other diagnosis-related groups within the system. The relative average value assigned to each group is its CMI.

== Hospital CMI ==
The CMI of a hospital reflects the diversity, clinical complexity and the needs for resources in the population of all the patients in the hospital.

The CMI value of a hospital can be used to adjust the average cost per patient (or per day) for a given hospital relative to the adjusted average cost for other hospitals by dividing the average cost per patient (or day) by the hospital's calculated CMI. The adjusted average cost per patient would reflect the charges reported for the types of cases treated in that year. If a hospital has a CMI greater than 1.00, their adjusted cost per patient or per day will be lower and conversely, if a hospital has a CMI less than 1.00, their adjusted cost will be higher.

Example:

The archived 2011 spreadsheet of the CMI for all US providers is linked here:

An analysis of that file shows 3619 hospital records. The number of cases per hospital ranges from a low of 1 to a high of 36,282 cases at Florida Hospital in Orlando, FL (Medicare ID 100007). That hospital has a Case Mix Index of 1.57. The mean number of cases for all the hospitals in the database is 3,098 with a standard deviation of 3,102. The Case Mix Index average is 1.37 with a minimum of 0.58, a maximum of 3.73, and a standard deviation of 0.31.

== See also ==
- Diagnosis-related group
