= Global Research Collaboration for Infectious Disease Preparedness =

The Global Research Collaboration for Infectious Disease Preparedness (GloPID-R) is an international initiative to anticipate and prepare for future threats from infectious diseases. GloPID-R is intended to be a means for facilitating communication and collaboration between its member bodies, as opposed to a funding or disaster response entity. Its secretariat is funded by the European Union through its Horizon 2020 initiative.

== History ==
GloPID-R was launched in February 2013 in Brussels, Belgium on the recommendation of the Heads of International Research Organizations (HIROs).

On February 11–12, 2020, GloPID-R co-hosted an event with the World Health Organization's R&D Blueprint called “2019 novel Coronavirus Global research and innovation forum: towards a research roadmap”. Participants in this conference identified a number of key research priorities which served as the basis on which funding decisions were made in response to the COVID-19 pandemic.

== Membership ==
GloPID-R's membership is made up of national research funding agencies, academic research institutes and philanthropic organizations. The World Health Organization (WHO), Coalition for Epidemic Preparedness Innovations (CEPI) and European and Developing Countries Clinical Trials Partnership (EDCCTP) serve as observers.

As of February 2023, GloPID-R's member organizations were as follows:

Members and Representatives
Organization	Representative	Nation
Academy of Scientific Research & Technology	Amr Radwan	Egypt
African Academy of Sciences	Thomas Kariuki	Kenya
ANRS Emerging Infectious Diseases	Yazdan Yazdanpanah	France
Bill & Melinda Gates Foundation	David W. Vaughn	United States
Butantan Institute	Alexander Precioso	Brazil
Canadian Institutes of Health Research	Charu Kaushic	Canada
Carlos III Health Institute	Tomás López-Peña	Spain
Coalition for Epidemic Preparedness Innovations	Richard Hatchett, Frederik Kristensen	Global
United States Department of Health and Human Services	Chris Hassell	United States
ESSENCE on Health Research Initiative	Garry Aslanyan	Global
European and Developing Countries Clinical Trials Partnership	Pauline Beattie	Global
European Commission	Barbara Kerstiens	European Union
European Research Infrastructure on Highly Pathogenic Agents	Jonathan Ewbank	European Union
Instituto Fiocruz	Marco Krieger	Brazil
National Research and Innovation Fund for Development (FONRID)	Hamidou H. Tamboura	Burkina Faso
Fund for Science, Technology and Innovation (FONSTI)	Annette Ouattara	Ivory Coast
Foreign, Commonwealth and Development Office	Jo Mulligan	United Kingdom
Gavi, the Vaccine Alliance	Marta Tufet-Bayona	Global
Federal Ministry of Education and Research	Manuela Rehtanz	Germany
Global Outbreak Alert and Response Network	Gail Carson	Global
International Development Research Centre	Samiran Panda	Canada
Japan Agency for Medical Research and Development	Shoji Miyagawa	Japan
Medical Research Council (MRC)	Anna Kinsey	United Kingdom
Italian Ministry of Health	Gaetano Guglielmi	Italy
National Council for Science and Technology	Eugène Mutimura	Rwanda
National Council of Science and Technology (CONACYT)	Juan José Serrato	Mexico
National Health and Medical Research Council	Anne Kelso	Australia
Thai National Institute of Health	Aree Thattiyaphong	Thailand
National Research Foundation of Korea	Choong-Min Ryu	South Korea
Netherlands Organisation for Health Research and Development (ZONMW)	Suzanne Verver	Netherlands
Pasteur Network	Nadia Khelef	France
Research Council of Norway	Thomas Hansteen	Norway
São Paulo Research Foundation	Rui Maciel	Brazil
Secretariat of Government of Science, Technology and Productive Innovation	Diego Galeano	Argentina
South African Medical Research Council	Jeffrey Mphahlele	South Africa
Swiss National Science Foundation	Matthias Egger	Switzerland
Department of Health and Social Care	Lucy Chappell	United Kingdom
Wellcome Trust	Jeremy Farrar	United Kingdom
World Health Organization	Ana-Maria Henao-Restrepo	Global
