= Ross Upshur =

Canadian physician and researcher

Ross Upshur (born 1958) is a Canadian physician and researcher. He is a professor at the Dalla Lana School of Public Health of the University of Toronto in Toronto, Canada, and heads its public health division.

== History ==
=== Education ===
Upshur received a BA in philosophy from the University of Winnipeg in 1982, and an MA, also in philosophy, from Queen's University in 1983; he completed an MD at McMaster University in 1986, and an MSc in epidemiology at the University of Toronto in 1997.

=== COVID-19 ===
On February 11-12, 2020, Upshur participated in a conference titled “2019 novel Coronavirus Global research and innovation forum: towards a research roadmap” co-hosted by the World Health Organization R&D Blueprint and Global Research Collaboration for Infectious Disease Preparedness (GLOPID-R). He delivered a presentation on ethical considerations for research during the emerging SARS-CoV-2 outbreak, which would go on to be declared as a pandemic one month later.

Upshur is a member of the Ontario COVID-19 Bioethics Table, working closely alongside the Ontario COVID-19 Science Advisory Table.

== Publications ==
His book publications include:

- (as co-author with R.P. Thompson) Philosophy of Medicine: An Introduction. London: Routledge, 2017
- (as co-editor with L. Jaakkimainen, S.E. Schultz and S. Maaten) Primary Care in Ontario. Toronto: Institute for Clinical Evaluative Sciences, 2006
- (as co-editor with A. Pinto) Introduction to Global Health Ethics. London: Routledge, 2012.
