= Rebekka Borsch =

Norwegian politician (born 1976)

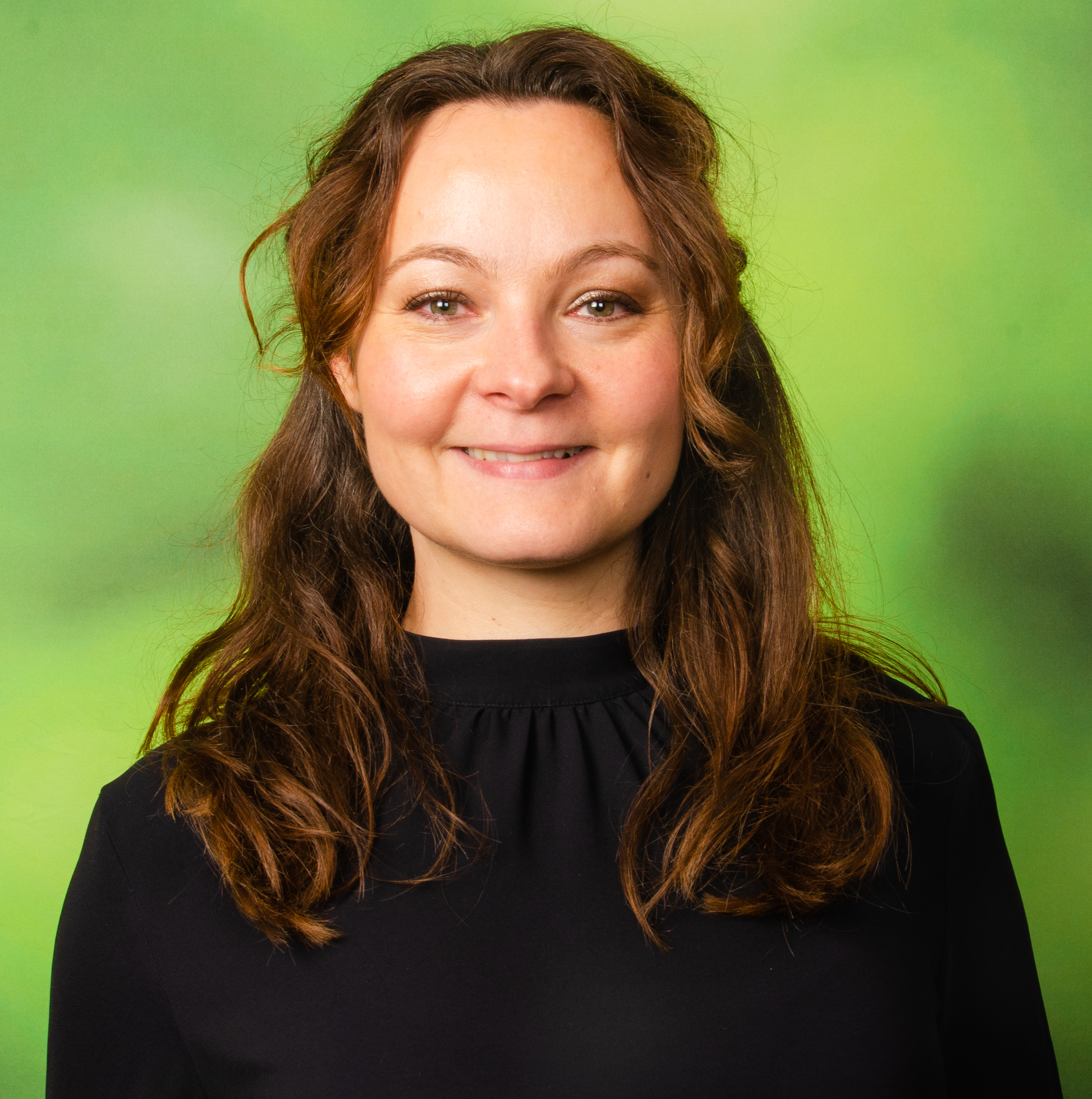
- Borsch in 2019
- Born: November 11, 1976 (age 49)
- Occupation: Politician

Rebekka Borsch (born 1976) is a German-Norwegian politician for the Liberal Party.

She hails from Olpe and took her education at the Free University of Berlin. She migrated to Norway in 2003, settling in Nærsnes, and received Norwegian citizenship in 2011.

She was elected to Røyken municipal council and as a deputy member of Buskerud county council, chaired Røyken Liberal Party and Buskerud Liberal Party; and in the Liberal Party nationwide she was a member of the political platform committee and the international committee. For the parliamentary elections, she headed the Liberal Party ballot in Buskerud in 2013 and 2017 without winning a seat.

As a personal adviser to Liberal Party leader Trine Skei Grande, Borsch was involved in the pre-discussions around the establishment of Solberg's Cabinet in 2013. The Liberal Party did not join the cabinet at the time, but was brought in later. Borsch became State Secretary for Iselin Nybø in the Ministry of Education in January 2018 and served until January 2020.

Outside of politics, Borsch was employed as a head of department in the Confederation of Norwegian Enterprise. She was appointed as chair of the UNESCO Commission of Norway, and in 2023 she was named as chair of the Bjerknes Centre for Climate Research, succeeding Arvid Hallén.
