= John Todd (British biologist) =

British geneticist

Professor John Todd FRS FMedSci
- Born: John Andrew Todd; 23 June 1958 (age 68)
- Citizenship: United Kingdom
- Education: University of Edinburgh (BSc); University of Cambridge (PhD)
- Awards: David Rumbough Award for Scientific Excellence
- Scientific career
- Fields: Human Genetics
- Workplaces: University of Cambridge; Stanford University; University of Oxford; Wellcome Trust
- Doctoral advisor: David Ellar
- Website: https://www.well.ox.ac.uk/people/john-todd

John Andrew Todd (born 23 June 1958) is a British geneticist who is Professor of Precision Medicine at the University of Oxford, director of the Wellcome Center for Human Genetics and the JDRF/Wellcome Trust Diabetes and Inflammation Laboratory, in addition to Jeffrey Cheah Fellow in Medicine at Brasenose College. He works in collaboration with David Clayton and Linda Wicker to examine the molecular basis of type 1 diabetes.

== Early life and education ==
Todd was born on 23 June 1958. He received a Bachelor of Science (BSc) degree in biological sciences from the University of Edinburgh in 1980. He went on to study biochemistry at the University of Cambridge, where he was supervised by David Ellar, completing his Doctor of Philosophy (PhD) degree in 1983 with a thesis entitled "Penicillin-binding proteins during growth and differentiation of bacilli".

== Awards and honors ==
- Founding Fellow of the Academy of Medical Sciences (1998).
- Honorary Member of the Royal College of Physicians (2000).
- Fellow of the Royal Society in (2009).
- JDRF David Rumbrough Award for Scientific Excellence (2011).
- Helmholtz international fellow award (2015).
- Emeritus Senior Investigator at the National Institute for Health and Care Research (NIHR) (2018).
