= 2025 Équateur province malaria outbreak =

Disease outbreak in the Province of Équateur, DRC

- Location of the main impacted province, in red
- Disease: Malaria
- Location: Province of Équateur, Democratic Republic of the Congo
- Dates: 10 January 2025 – ongoing
- Confirmed cases: Nearly 1,100
- Deaths: 60+
- Fatality rate: 6.3%

In early 2025, there was a malaria outbreak in northwestern Democratic Republic of Congo (DRC), although the cause of the disease was initially unidentified. The outbreaks, which affected multiple villages in the Province of Équateur and have so far resulted in at least 1,000 cases and at least 60 fatalities, were marked by rapid progression from symptom onset to death.

== Outbreak ==
The outbreak was first documented in early January 2025. By late February 2025, health authorities had documented nearly 1,100 cases and at least 60 fatalities across at least two distinct geographic clusters in the northwestern region of the Democratic Republic of the Congo, separated by about 180 kilometres. It is unclear whether the two locations are facing the same cause.

The World Health Organization (WHO) African Regional Office released multiple bulletins tracking the situation. Preliminary investigations suggested a possible connection between the initial cases and consumption of a bat carcass in Boloko by three children, who subsequently became ill and died between January 10 to 13. By the end of January, four more fatalities among victims aged between five and 18 were reported in the village, with another death on January 22 reported in the neighboring village of Danda. A second outbreak was recorded in Bomate on February 9.

The outbreaks were concentrated in two primary clusters both in the Province of Équateur: the Bolomba Cluster, which was the initial outbreak site with at least 12 cases with eight deaths, and the larger Basankusu Cluster, with at least 943 reported cases and 52 fatalities. Both clusters are situated in the northwestern region of the DRC, characterized by dense tropical forest and limited transportation infrastructure. According to the WHO, the geographical isolation of these communities, combined with inadequate healthcare resources, created significant challenges for containment efforts and tracking the spread of the disease.

The overall case fatality rate across both clusters was approximately 6.3%. Children under five years of age represented approximately 18% of total cases and 15.5% of recorded deaths.

== Symptoms ==
Patients affected by the mystery illness exhibited several symptoms which included fever, chills, cough, headaches, vomiting (including hematemesis), abdominal pain, diarrhea (in some cases bloody diarrhea), epistaxis, neck stiffness, and hemorrhagic fever. Medical officials reported that the majority of fatal cases progressed from symptom onset to death within 48 hours. Some patients succumbed to the disease within hours of developing symptoms.

== Possible cause ==
Laboratory testing of 571 samples from the Basankusu cluster revealed that 54.1% were also positive for malaria, which is common in the region. Health experts noted that while malaria was clearly present in many patients, the severity and rapid progression of illness raised questions about whether additional factors might be involved, such as particularly virulent malaria strains, co-infections, or complications like sepsis.

Medical experts noted that while these symptoms could be consistent with various infectious diseases, the presence of bleeding manifestations initially raised concerns about viral hemorrhagic fevers such as Ebola or Marburg virus disease. However, 18 cases tested negative for Ebola and Marburg; other hemorrhagic fevers are being investigated.

On 27 February 2025, Dieudonne Mwamba, director general of the National Institute of Public Health, said he believed the outbreak was "not an unknown and mysterious disease" but rather some combination of malaria and food poisoning, given that 78% of people affected had tested positive for malaria. Other possible explanations are contamination of the water supply or an arbovirus.

On 24 March 2025, the National Institute of Public Health said that the outbreak was caused by malaria following tests.

== Response ==
The WHO African Regional Office issued regular situation updates and deployed personnel to assist with field investigations. Local health authorities established monitoring systems at regional facilities like the Bikoro Hospital, with laboratory testing being mobilized to rule out high-consequence pathogens. Public health officials emphasized that the remoteness of the affected communities and limited healthcare resources complicated containment efforts. The WHO indicated that "immediate high-level intervention" was necessary to prevent further spread of the illness.

Health workers established treatment centers in affected areas, though local healthcare infrastructure was limited. Multiple accounts from affected communities indicated medication shortages in the initial response phase. One resident reported going two weeks without access to proper medication for her child until WHO teams arrived with additional supplies. Fear of the illness prompted some residents to flee affected villages.

== See also ==
- West Africa Ebola virus epidemic
- Mpox in the Democratic Republic of the Congo
- 2024 Kwango province malaria outbreak
- 2019–2020 measles outbreak in the Democratic Republic of the Congo
- 2016 Angola and DR Congo yellow fever outbreak
- 2008 Democratic Republic of the Congo cholera outbreak
