= Diabetes and Inflammation Laboratory =

Medical research programme

The JDRF/Wellcome Trust Diabetes and Inflammation Laboratory (JDRF/WT DIL), centred in the Cambridge Institute for Medical Research, is a multi-disciplinary research programme within the department of Medical Genetics at the University of Cambridge. The current director is John Todd FMedSci FRS and Professor of Medical Genetics at the University of Cambridge.

The goals of the JDRF/WT DIL are to identify and characterise the effects of the susceptibility genes for type 1 diabetes in order to better understand the earliest events in human physiology that lead to autoimmune destruction of the insulin-producing beta-cells of pancreas.

Other notable members include:-

- Linda Wicker, Professor of Immunogenetics (Co-Director)
- David Clayton, Professor of Biostatistics
