= Responses to the COVID-19 pandemic in September 2020 =

Aspect of viral disease pandemic

This article documents the chronology of the response to the COVID-19 pandemic in September 2020, which originated in Wuhan, China in December 2019. Some developments may become known or fully understood only in retrospect. Reporting on this pandemic began in December 2019.

== Reactions and measures at the United Nations ==
=== 1 September ===
The UN released a new report by UN Women, From Insights to Action: Gender Equality in the wake of COVID-19, stating that the COVID-19 pandemic and its economic consequences will likely force an additional 47 million more women into poverty, reversing decades of progress to eliminate extreme poverty.

=== 2 September ===
The UN Secretary-General, at one of a series of the Aqaba Process international meetings of heads of state to improve global cooperation in fighting terrorism and violent extremism, warned the world had "entered a volatile and unstable new phase" in terms of the impact of COVID-19 on peace and security.

=== 3 September ===
UNICEF in a new report warned that the world's richest nations must protect child well-being in terms of COVID-19 fallout, with children suffering from mental health concerns, obesity and poor social and academic skills. The UN Secretary-General called for concerted and meaningful action, especially from the G20, to make COVID recovery 'a true turning point' for people and planet, and outlined six climate-positive actions for a sustainable recovery.

=== 4 September ===
UNICEF announced that it will be leading global procurement and fair and equitable supply of COVID-19 vaccinations when they are available. The WHO announced that the COVID-19 pandemic had caused massive global disruption in diagnosing and treating people with deadly but preventable diseases, including over half of cancer patients. The UN Relief and Works Agency for Palestine Refugees announced that it needs approximately $95 million to cover the emergency needs of 5.6 million registered Palestinian refugees until the end of the year, during a COVID-19 lock-down.

=== 7 September ===
The WHO Director-General announced that the Review Committee of the International Health Regulations, designed to prepare for the next pandemic, is commencing its work, as he urged more investment in public health.

=== 8 September ===
The UN Deputy Secretary-General urged Finance Ministers globally to solidify a menu of options to help recovery in the face of 70-100 million people potentially experiencing extreme poverty, an extra 265 million people potentially encountering acute food shortages, and approximately 400 million lost jobs, together with 1.6 billion educations affected.

=== 9 September ===
The UN Secretary General, launching a new report United in Science 2020, stated that greenhouse gas levels were at record levels, while emissions that had temporarily declined because of the coronavirus pandemic were returning to pre-COVID levels, as global temperatures hit new highs.

=== 10 September ===
The UN Secretary-General warned an Ambassadors meeting for a virtual High-Level Forum on the Culture of Peace that due to the pandemic "Not since the United Nations was founded have we faced such a complex and multidimensional threat to global peace and security". The UN and European Union co-hosted the Inaugural Meeting of the Facilitation Council of the G20 ACT-Accelerator to produce two billion vaccine doses, which so far has received $2.7 billion of the $35 billion necessary to shorten the pandemic and speed economic global recovery.

=== 16 September ===
The UN released the September update of the UN Comprehensive Response to COVID-19 report, reiterating its three-point response of saving lives, protecting societies and recovering better.

=== 17 September ===
On World Patient Safety Day, the WHO reminded the world of the vital role of health workers, emphasizing the need to ensure their protection, safety, and mental health, especially given the heightened risks of the pandemic.

=== 18 September ===
The WHO Director-General presented the second report of the WHO and World Bank-backed Global Preparedness Monitoring Board, A World in Disorder, which recommends developing "muscle memory", i.e., repetition, as a "key to pandemic response".

=== 21 September ===
The WHO Director-General unveiled the coronavirus Vaccines Global Access Facility (COVAX), part of the ACT Accelerator, to deliver two billion doses of coronavirus vaccine globally by the end of 2021.

=== 23 September ===
The UN and its partners, including the International Federation of the Red Cross, urged countries to take urgent action to address an "infodemic" of coronavirus misinformation, both online and in the real world. The International Labour Organization reported on the occasion of the sixth edition of its 'COVID Monitor' that COVID-19 has had a "catastrophic" impact on workers, equivalent to 495 million full-time jobs lost globally in the second quarter of the year, with lower and middle-income countries suffering most.

=== 25 September ===
In the face of a potential global shortage of influenza vaccines and the ongoing COVID-19 pandemic, the WHO has recommended countries prioritize the elderly and health workers. A new report from Every Woman Every Child highlights progress in protecting women and children but reported "disruptions in essential health interventions disproportionately impacting the most vulnerable women and children" due to COVID-19.

=== 26 September ===
UN Women announced that new data co-released by the UN Development Programme from the COVID-19 Global Gender Response Tracker revealed that the majority of countries were not sufficiently protecting women and girls from the COVID-19 related economic and social fallout.

=== 29 September ===
UN Secretary-General António Guterres called the millionth death from COVID-19 an "agonizing milestone", affirmed the importance of every individual life, and called for solidarity in the global recovery. He also welcomed the G20's Debt Service Suspension Initiative and called for greater effort to prevent a global recession and urged greater efforts against the 'global scourge' of gender-based violence, which had been intensified by the pandemic.

=== 30 September ===
The UN Secretary-General called on Member States to fund COVID-19 global vaccine efforts, reporting that $3 billion of $35 billion had been secured for the Access to COVID-19 Tools.

== Reactions and measures in Africa ==
Map of the WHO's regional offices and their respective operating regions. Africa; HQ: Brazzaville, Republic of the Congo Western Pacific; HQ: Manila, Philippines Eastern Mediterranean; HQ: Cairo, Egypt South East Asia; HQ: New Delhi, India Europe; HQ: Copenhagen, Denmark Americas; HQ: Washington, D.C., US

== Reactions and measures in the Americas ==
=== 23 September ===
As of 23 September, government agencies across the region report that numbers of confirmed cases have started to decline.

- The City Of Toronto all event permits and festivals until December 31st https://www.toronto.ca/news/city-of-toronto-extends-cancellation-of-outdoor-major-events-and-provides-565000-to-support-cultural-festivals-impacted-by-covid-19/

== Reactions and measures in Europe ==
=== 26 September ===
UK governments imposed a quasi-lockdown, with more than a quarter of the UK population falling under stricter coronavirus lockdown rules.

== Reactions and measures in South and Southeast Asia ==
=== 1 September ===
Senior Minister Ismail Sabri Yaakob has announced that long-term pass holders from India, Indonesia and the Philippines will be unable to enter Malaysia due to a spike of cases in those countries effective 7 September.

=== 7 September ===
On 7 September, the Malaysian Immigration Department banned nationals from 23 countries with a high number of COVID-19 cases including the United States, the United Kingdom, Brazil, Russia, France, Italy, Turkey and Germany, and previously announced India, the Philippines and Indonesia.

=== 10 September ===
In Indonesia, Jakarta city authorities have placed the capital in a partial lockdown in order to alleviate pressure on the city's healthcare system.

Malaysian Senior Minister Ismail Sabri Yaakob announced that enhanced Movement Control Orders would be imposed on the Kota Setar district in Kedah state and Tawau prison in Sabah state following new outbreaks.

=== 28 September ===
Malaysian Senior Minister Ismail Sabri Yaakob announced that an enhanced MCO would be enforced in the Sabah districts of Lahad Datu, Tawau, Kunak, and Semporna between 29 September and 12 October. Under this lockdown, travel and business activities within those districts will be limited.

== Reactions and measures in the Western Pacific ==
=== 3 September ===
Australian Health Minister Greg Hunt has extended a ban on overseas travel and cruise ships entering Australia until 17 December 2020.

=== 4 September ===
New Zealand Prime Minister Jacinda Ardern announced that New Zealand would remain on Alert Level 2 while Auckland would remain on Alert Level 2.5 for at least ten more days. The New Zealand Cabinet will review them again on 14 September. That same day, Immigration Minister Kris Faafoi extended the visas of visitors due to expire before the end of October by five months. In addition, temporary migrants unable to leave New Zealand due to international travel restrictions will be granted a new two-month COVID-19 short-term visa.

=== 6 September ===
In Australia, Victorian Premier Daniel Andrews has extended stage 4 COVID-19 lockdown restrictions on Melbourne until 28 September.

The New Zealand Government has required all border workers to undergo testing for COVID-19 from midnight on 7 September.

=== 9 September ===
The New Zealand Government has allowed certain non-citizens and non-residents to apply for border exceptions including those holding a job or operating a business in New Zealand; residency and work visa holders, and partners who are Australian citizens or from visa-waiver countries. In addition, those who have been unable to enter the country to activate their residency visa or unable to return before their residency visa expires will receive a reprieve.

=== 14 September ===
New Zealand Prime Minister Jacinda Ardern has extended the Alert Level 2.5 rating in Auckland and the Level 2 rating in the rest of the country by one week, with plans to ease lockdown restrictions the following week. In addition, the Government relaxed social distancing restrictions on public transportation including buses and planes.

=== 21 September ===
New Zealand Prime Minister Jacinda Ardern announced that Auckland would move into Alert Level 2 on 23 September at 11:59pm while the rest of the country would move into Alert Level 1 tonight at 11:59pm. Under Auckland's Alert Level 2 status, public gatherings of 100 people will be allowed but a 50-person cap remains on funerals and tangihanga.

== See also ==
- Timeline of the COVID-19 pandemic
