= David Clayton (disambiguation) =

David Clayton is a statistician and epidemiologist.

David Clayton may also refer to:

- David Clayton (visual effects), visual effects supervisor
- Sir David Robert Clayton, 12th Baronet, of Marden (1936–2021), of the Clayton baronets

== See also ==
- David Clayton-Thomas
- David Clayton Rogers
- Clayton (surname)
