= John A. Todd =

John A. Todd may refer to:

- J. A. Todd (1908–1994), British geometer
- John A. Todd (biologist), professor of medical genetics at the University of Cambridge
