= V451 vaccine =

Terminated COVID-19 vaccine candidate

Vaccine description
- Target: SARS-CoV-2
- Vaccine type: Protein subunit

Clinical data
- Other names: SARS-CoV-2 Sclamp
- Routes of administration: Intramuscular

Legal status
- Legal status: Terminated

V451 was a COVID-19 vaccine candidate developed by the University of Queensland and the Australian pharmaceutical company CSL Limited. The vaccine candidate used the University of Queensland's molecular clamp technology and the MF59 adjuvant.

== Description ==
V451 is a protein subunit vaccine. As part of the vaccine's design, researchers added "a fragment of one protein found on the HIV virus" as a "ground-breaking molecular clamp technology".

== Terminated trial ==
The development of the vaccine was cancelled on 11 December 2020 during its Phase I trial, after a number of trial participants were found to give false positive test results for HIV antibodies when they did not in fact have HIV. This was due to the HIV virus fragment used as a molecular clamp leading to "a partial antibody response" to HIV. This is an undesirable outcome as it will interfere with future HIV screening tests for affected participants.

Nine days prior to the termination, on 2 December, the first emergency use authorisation had been granted to a COVID-19 vaccine; the Pfizer–BioNTech COVID-19 vaccine in the United Kingdom. Following the termination of V451, vaccine production capacity by CSL Limited was diverted to the Oxford–AstraZeneca COVID-19 vaccine.
