= John-Arne Røttingen =

Norwegian physician

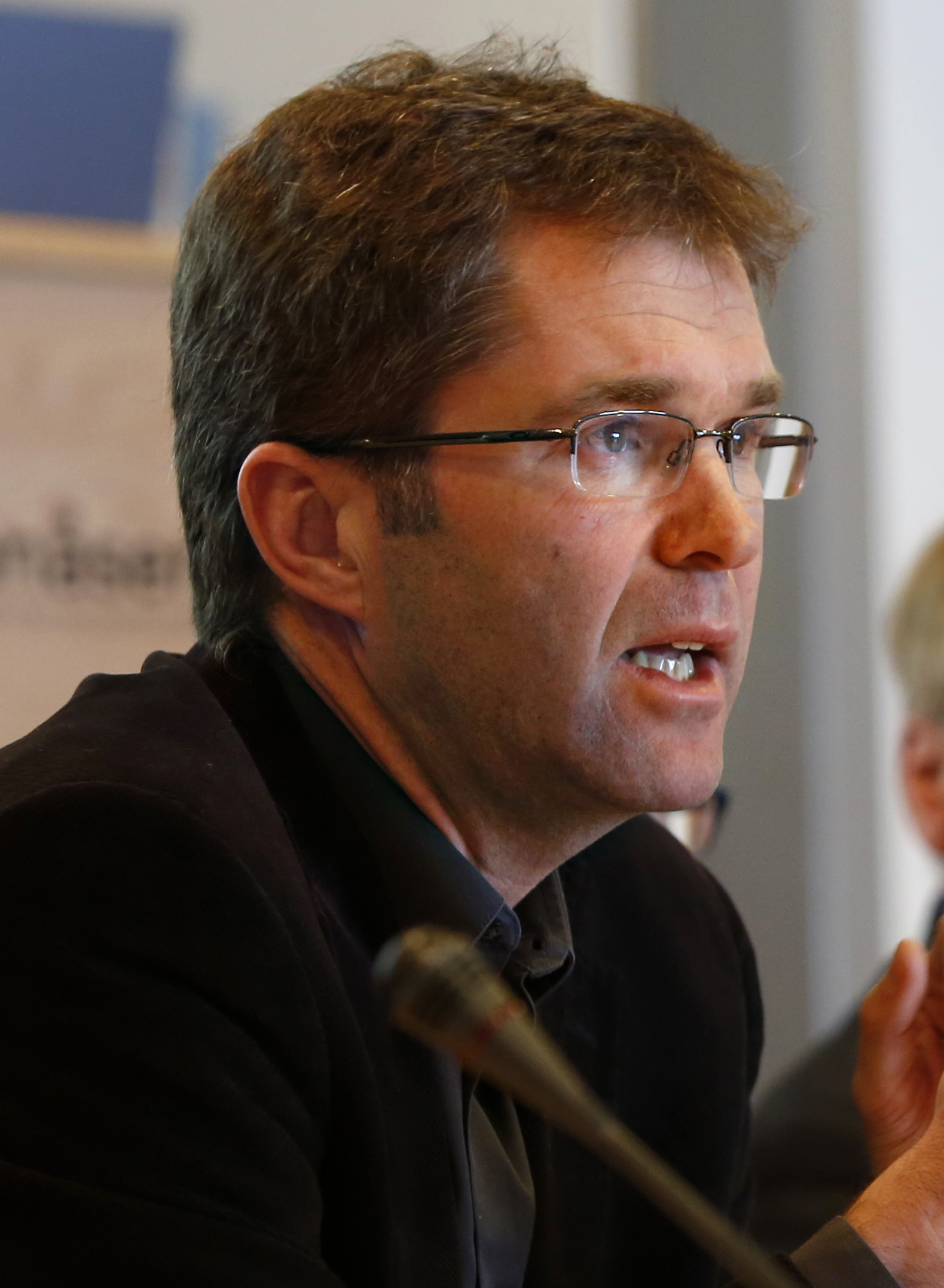
- Røttingen in 2015
- Born: 27 March 1969 (age 57)
- Education: University of Oslo
- Occupations: Medical scientist, research administrator and civil servant
- Employers: University of Oslo; Research Council of Norway

John-Arne Røttingen (born 27 March 1969) is a Norwegian medical scientist, research administrator and civil servant. He is currently the chief executive officer of the Wellcome Trust. Previously, he served as Ambassador for Global Health in the Norwegian Ministry of Foreign Affairs, and has been a special advisor to the World Health Organization (WHO).

== Early life ==
Røttingen is from Bø Municipality. He graduated as a Candidate of Medicine in 1996 and Doctor Medicinae in 1999 from the University of Oslo, followed by a Master of Science from the University of Oxford, and a Master of Public Affairs from Harvard Kennedy School.

He was a researcher at the University of Oslo and at the Harvard School of Public Health. His research interests have been epidemiology and global health.

== Career ==
Earlier in his career, Røttingen worked as executive director of infection control and environmental health at the Norwegian Institute of Public Health (NIPH). In this capacity, he also chaired the WHO's Consultative Expert Working Group on Research and Development from 2010 until 2012. In 2018, he co-chaired a task force of Science Europe (alongside David Sweeney of UKRI) which developed a specific implementation guidance on the so-called Plan S principles.

In January 2017, Røttingen served as interim CEO for the launch of Coalition for Epidemic Preparedness Innovations at the World Economic Forum in Davos. Since its inception in 2017, he has been also a member the Scientific Advisory Group of the WHO R&D Blueprint, a global strategy and preparedness plan that allows the rapid activation of research activities during epidemics, chaired by Jeremy Farrar.

In March 2017, Røttingen was appointed CEO of the Research Council of Norway.

From 2020, Røttingen also chaired the Executive Group and the International Steering Committee of the WHO' Solidarity trial to compare four untested treatments for hospitalized people with severe COVID-19 illness.

In early 2021, Røttingen was appointed by the G20 to the High Level Independent Panel (HLIP) on financing the global commons for pandemic preparedness and response, co-chaired by Ngozi Okonjo-Iweala, Tharman Shanmugaratnam and Lawrence Summers. That same year, he was also appointed to the Pandemic Preparedness Partnership (PPP), an expert group chaired by Patrick Vallance to advise the G7 presidency held by the government of Prime Minister Boris Johnson. From mid-2021, he was part of the Access to COVID-19 Tools Accelerator's Vaccine Manufacturing Working Group, co-chaired by Zane Dangor and Lars-Hendrik Röller.

== Other activities ==
- Virchow Prize for Global Health, Member of the Council (since 2022)
- Gavi, Member of the Board
- PATH, member of the board of directors
- Visiting Fellow of Practice at the Blavatnik School of Government, University of Oxford
- World Health Organization, member of the European Advisory Committee on Health Research (EACHR)

== See also ==
- Disease X
- Coalition for Epidemic Preparedness Innovations

Academic offices
Preceded by Arvid Hallén	Director of the Research Council of Norway; 2017–	Succeeded by Incumbent
