= Access to COVID-19 Tools Accelerator =

G20 COVID-19 global initiative

The Access to COVID-19 Tools Accelerator (ACT Accelerator or ACT-A), or the Global Collaboration to Accelerate the Development, Production and Equitable Access to New COVID-19 diagnostics, therapeutics and vaccines, is a G20 initiative announced by pro-tem Chair Mohammed al-Jadaan on 24 April 2020. A call to action was published simultaneously by the World Health Organization (WHO) on 24 April. As of January 2022, it was the largest international effort to achieve equitable access to COVID-19 health technologies.

== Definition ==
The ACT Accelerator is a multinational collaboration, and multistakeholder initiative including the World Health Organization, the Coalition for Epidemic Preparedness Innovations (CEPI), FIND, GAVI the Vaccine Alliance, the Global Fund, UNICEF, Unitaid, Wellcome, the World Bank and governments, to raise financial support of accelerated research and development, production, and globally-equitable access to COVID-19 tests, therapies, and vaccines. It is a framework for collaboration, not a new organization or a decision-making body. In March 2020, G20 leaders had called for a cross-discipline support structure to enable partners to share resources and knowledge and in April 2020 it was launched by WHO, European Commission, France and the Bill & Melinda Gates Foundation. On 24 April 2020 pro-tem Chair Mohammed al-Jadaan announced it, simultaneously to the WHO. Sir Andrew Witty and Dr Ngozi Okonjo-Iweala accepted to act as Special Envoys to the ACT Accelerator from the WHO.

The ACT Accelerator comprises four pillars, each managed by two to three collaborating partners:1) Vaccines (also called "COVAX" pillar), 2) Diagnostics, 3) Therapeutics and 4) Health Systems Connector. Diagnostics are the most important medical technology available to monitor and control the spread of COVID-19, to avoid repeated lockdowns, which threaten economies and ways of life. Testing supports healthcare services to be managed and COVID-19 transmission to be suppressed. The therapeutics pillar is a research effort to discover and develop promising COVID-19 drug development for COVID-19 infection and illness. It involves monitoring over 1,700 clinical trials, and was part of the effort to provide dexamethasone for up to 2.9 million patients in low-income countries and facilitates future access to monoclonal antibody therapies in low- and middle-income countries. The pillar for health systems analyzes needs and resources in some 100 countries to identify problems, capacity, and requirements for access to and implementation of COVID-19 tools across world regions. The COVAX pillar has the goal of facilitating licensure of several COVID-19 vaccines, influencing equitable pricing, and providing equal access for up to 2 billion doses by the end of 2021 to protect frontline healthcare workers and people with high-risk of COVID-19 infection, particularly in low-to-middle income countries.

=== Coalition for Epidemic Preparedness Innovations ===
In 2017, a multinational organization named Coalition for Epidemic Preparedness Innovations, CEPI was formed. It is working with international health authorities and vaccine developers to create vaccines for preventing epidemics.

Over 2020 throughout the pandemic, CEPI funded the development of nine COVID-19 vaccine candidates in a portfolio deliberately made diverse across different vaccine technologies to minimize the typically high risk of failure inherent in vaccine development. As of December 2020, CEPI supported the vaccine research organizations and programs of AstraZeneca/University of Oxford (AZD1222), Clover Biopharmaceuticals (SCB-2019), CureVac (Zorecimeran/CVnCoV), Inovio (INO-4800), Institut Pasteur (MV-SARS-CoV-2), Moderna (mRNA-1273), Novavax (NVX-CoV2373), SK bioscience (GBP510), and Hong Kong University. CEPI is an observer of the Global Research Collaboration for Infectious Disease Preparedness (GLoPID-R) which was working closely with the WHO and member states to identify priorities for funding specific research needed for a COVID-19 vaccine, coordinating among the international funding and research organizations to maintain updated information on vaccine progress and avoid duplicate funding.

== Timeline ==
The ACT-Accelerator was launched on 24 April 2020. The United Nations Foundation started the ACT Together Fund in order to raise money for the Accelerator.

On 10 September 2020 the UN and the European Union co-hosted the inaugural meeting of the Facilitation Council of the ACT-Accelerator, which had received $2.7 billion of the $35 billion necessary to secure the 2 billion COVID-19 vaccine doses, 245 million treatments, and 500 million tests that the initiative deemed necessary to end the pandemic and speed economic global recovery. In September 2020, ACT Accelerator partners committed to provide 120 million COVID-19 rapid tests for low- and middle-income countries.

Although the Trump administration of the United States had withdrawn its financial support of the WHO and ACT Accelerator in 2020, the United States reasserted its support of the WHO and COVAX on 21 January 2021 following the inauguration of President Joe Biden.

By December 2020, more than 10 billion vaccine doses had been pre-ordered by developed countries. The manufacturers of three vaccines closest to global distribution – Pfizer, Moderna, and AstraZeneca – predicted a manufacturing capacity of 5.3 billion doses in 2021, which could be used to vaccinate about 3 billion people (as the vaccines require two doses for a protective effect against COVID-19). Due to the high demand in preorders from rich countries for 2021, people in low-income developing countries may not receive vaccinations from these manufacturers until 2023 or 2024, increasing the use of the COVAX initiative to supply vaccines equitably. Emphasizing the need for broad distribution of safe, effective vaccines against COVID-19, especially across developing countries, GAVI uses the slogan, "No one is safe until everyone is safe."

During 2020, major changes in the overall effort of developing COVID-19 vaccines were the increasing number of collaborations of the multinational pharmaceutical industry with national governments, and the diversity and growing number of biotechnology companies in many countries focusing on a COVID-19 vaccine. According to CEPI, the general geographic distribution of COVID-19 vaccine development involves organizations in North America having about 40% of the world's COVID-19 vaccine research, compared with 30% in Asia and Australia, 26% in Europe, and a few projects in South America and Africa.

== Financing ==
In May 2020, the WHO had a telethon which raised US$8.8 billion in pledges from forty countries to support rapid development of vaccines.

As of May 2020 CEPI organized a US$2 billion fund in a global partnership between public, private, philanthropic, and civil society organizations for accelerated research and clinical testing of nine COVID-19 vaccine candidates, with the 2020–21 goal of supporting several candidate vaccines for full development to licensing. By early May 2020, the United Kingdom, Canada, Belgium, Norway, Switzerland, Germany and the Netherlands had already donated US$915 million to CEPI. The Gates Foundation, a private charitable organization dedicated to vaccine research and distribution, was donating US$250 million in support of CEPI for research and public educational support on COVID-19 vaccines.

In December 2020, the Gates Foundation donated another US$250 million to the ACT Accelerator to "support the delivery of new COVID-19 tests, treatments, and vaccines, particularly in low- and middle-income countries" during 2021, making the Foundation's total donation of US$1.75 billion toward the COVID-19 response.

As of December 2020, US$2.4 billion had been raised for the overall ACT Accelerator, with nine vaccine candidates being funded by COVAX and CEPI – the world's largest COVID-19 vaccine portfolio – with 189 countries committed to the eventual deployment plan. See table above.

=== National governments contributions ===
In May 2020, France announced a US$4.9 million investment in a COVID-19 vaccine research consortium via CEPI involving the Institut Pasteur, Themis Bioscience (Vienna, Austria), and the University of Pittsburgh, bringing CEPI's total investment in COVID-19 vaccine development to US$480 million by May. Belgium, Norway, Switzerland, Germany, and the Netherlands have been major contributors to the CEPI effort for COVID-19 vaccine research in Europe.

On 4 May 2020, the Canadian government committed CA$850 million to the WHO's live streaming effort to raise US$8 billion for COVID-19 vaccines and preparedness. On 18 May 2020, China had pledged US$2 billion to support overall efforts by the WHO for programs against COVID-19.

On 22 July 2020, China announced that it planned to provide a US$1 billion loan to make its vaccine accessible for countries in Latin America and the Caribbean.

On 24 August 2020, Chinese Premier Li Keqiang announced it would provide five Southeast Asian countries of Cambodia, Laos, Myanmar, Thailand and Vietnam priority access to the vaccine once it was fully developed.

== Controversies ==
=== Inequities ===
COVAX is designed to assist vaccine purchases and distribution for poor and middle-income countries unable to compete in the open market and avoid inequities for vaccine access. However, by December 2020, more than 10 billion vaccine doses had been preordered mostly by high-income countries comprising only 14% of the world's population like the United Kingdom, Canada, and the United States. Poorer countries, such as South Africa, had difficulty obtaining vaccine deliveries, despite having a factory for making COVID-19 vaccines within the country. Half of South African citizens live in poverty, and may receive a vaccine only by participating as volunteers in clinical trials.

The COVAX administration, governments, and vaccine manufacturers have been criticized for lack of transparency and accountability over fair pricing and equitable allocation of COVID-19 vaccines to developing countries where financial and vaccination resources are limited, and government corruption may exist.

=== Limited transparency of roles and accountability ===
In examining the founding principles of participation, transparency, and accountability, one study found lacking clarity on the roles and responsibilities of the stakeholders, questions about potential conflicts of interest, unclear accountability with no ACT-A wide accountability framework and receding role of governments.
