= Synthetic virology =

Branch of virology

Synthetic virology is a branch of virology engaged in the study and engineering of synthetic man-made viruses. It is a multidisciplinary research field at the intersection of virology, synthetic biology, computational biology, and DNA nanotechnology, from which it borrows and integrates its concepts and methodologies. There is a wide range of applications for synthetic viral technology such as medical treatments, investigative tools, and reviving organisms.

== Constructing de novo synthetic viruses ==
Advances in genome sequencing technology and oligonucleotide synthesis paved the way for construction of synthetic genomes based on previously sequenced genomes. Both RNA and DNA viruses can be made using existing methods. RNA viruses have historically been utilized due to the typically small genome size and existing reverse transcription machinery present. The genome size of RNA viruses generally ranges from 3.5 to 30 kilobases (kb), which is much smaller than that of most DNA viruses (for example, the genome of poxviruses can reach more than 200 kb); the smaller genome size reduces the difficulty of chemical synthesis and assembly. The first man-made infectious viruses generated without any natural template were of the polio virus and the φX174 bacteriophage. With synthetic live viruses, it is not whole viruses that are synthesized but rather their genome at first, both in the case of DNA and RNA viruses. For many viruses, viral RNA is infectious when introduced into a cell (during infection or after reverse transcription). These organisms are able to sustain an infectious life cycle upon introduction in vivo.

== Applications ==
This technology is now being used to investigate novel vaccine strategies. The ability to synthesize viruses has far-reaching consequences. Its core significance lies in the fact that a virus can no longer be considered a biologically extinct species as long as its complete genome sequence is known and a susceptible host cell capable of supporting its replication is available. As of March 2020, the full-length genome sequences of 9,240 different viruses, including the smallpox virus, are publicly available in an online database maintained by the National Institutes of Health. Synthetic viruses have also been researched as potential gene therapy tools.

== See also ==
- Bioterrorism
- Disease X
