= Heads of International Research Organizations =

Heads of International Research Organizations (HIROs) is an organization composed of directors of International Research Organizations focussed on Health, Care and Wellbeing. It was established by Harold Varmus in 1998. Representatives from United States, Canada, The Netherlands, China, EU, India, South Africa, and South Korea. The members include director of NIH, Wellcome Trust, Korea Health Industry Development Institute (KHIDI).

In February 2013, HIROs oversaw the creation of the Global Research Collaboration for Infectious Disease Preparedness (GloPID-R) to act as a coordinating instrument for global research funders in the realm of pandemic response.
