= Disease X =

Placeholder infectious disease name from the World Health Organization

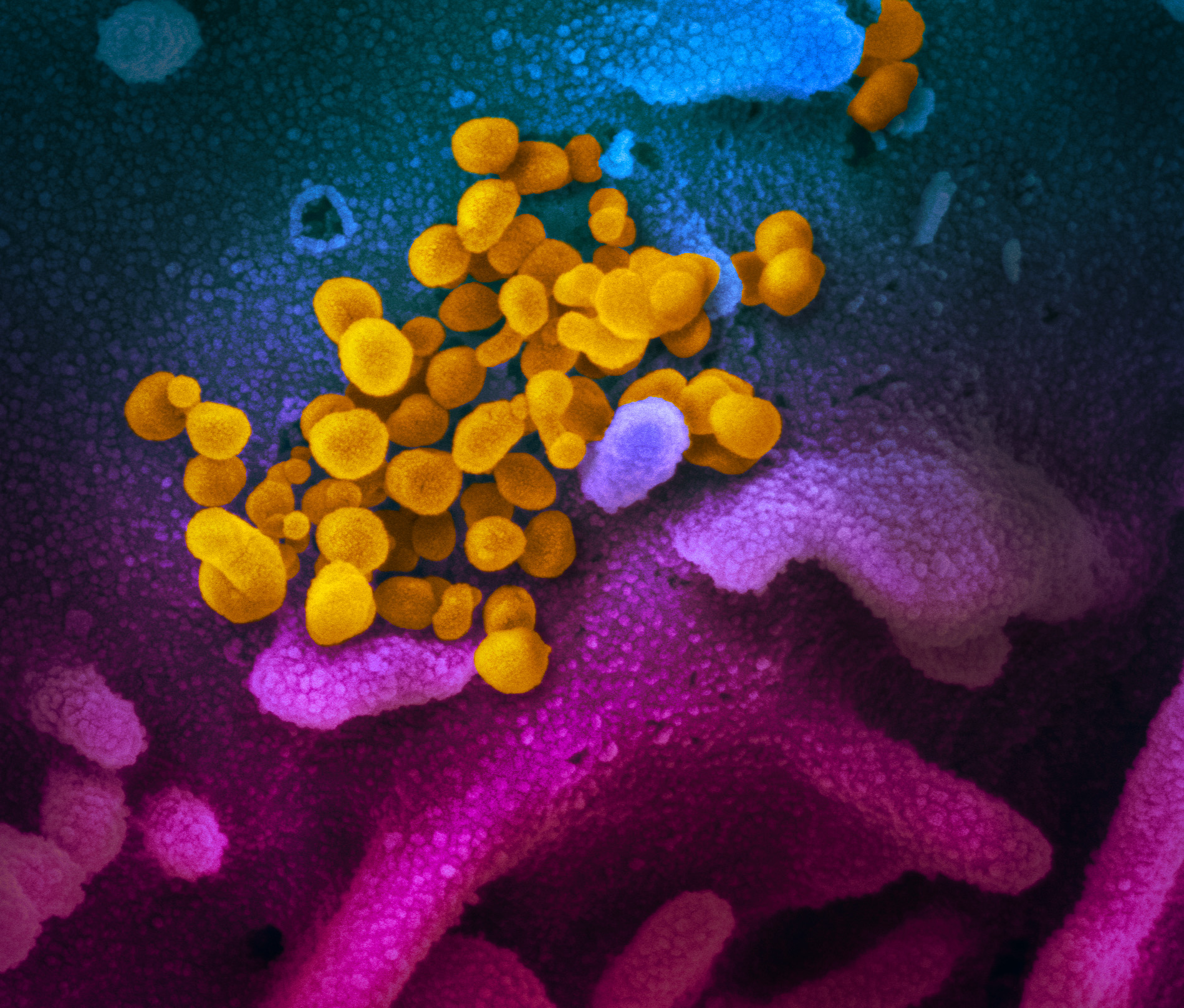
Colored scanning electron microscope (SEM) image of SARS-CoV-2, speculated in 2020 as being the first virus to create Disease X

Disease X is a placeholder name that was adopted by the World Health Organization (WHO) in February 2018 on their shortlist of blueprint priority diseases to represent a hypothetical, unknown pathogen. The WHO adopted the placeholder name to ensure that their planning was sufficiently flexible to adapt to an unknown pathogen (e.g., broader vaccines and manufacturing facilities). Former Director of the US National Institute of Allergy and Infectious Diseases Anthony Fauci stated that the concept of Disease X would encourage WHO projects to focus their research efforts on entire classes of viruses (e.g., flaviviruses), instead of just individual strains (e.g., zika virus), thus improving WHO capability to respond to unforeseen strains.

In 2020, experts, including some of the WHO's own expert advisors, speculated that COVID-19, caused by the SARS-CoV-2 virus strain, met the requirements to be the first Disease X. In December 2024, an unidentified disease in the Democratic Republic of the Congo, later revealed to be an aggressive strain of malaria, was sometimes referred to as Disease X after infecting over 400 people and killing at least 79.

== Rationale ==
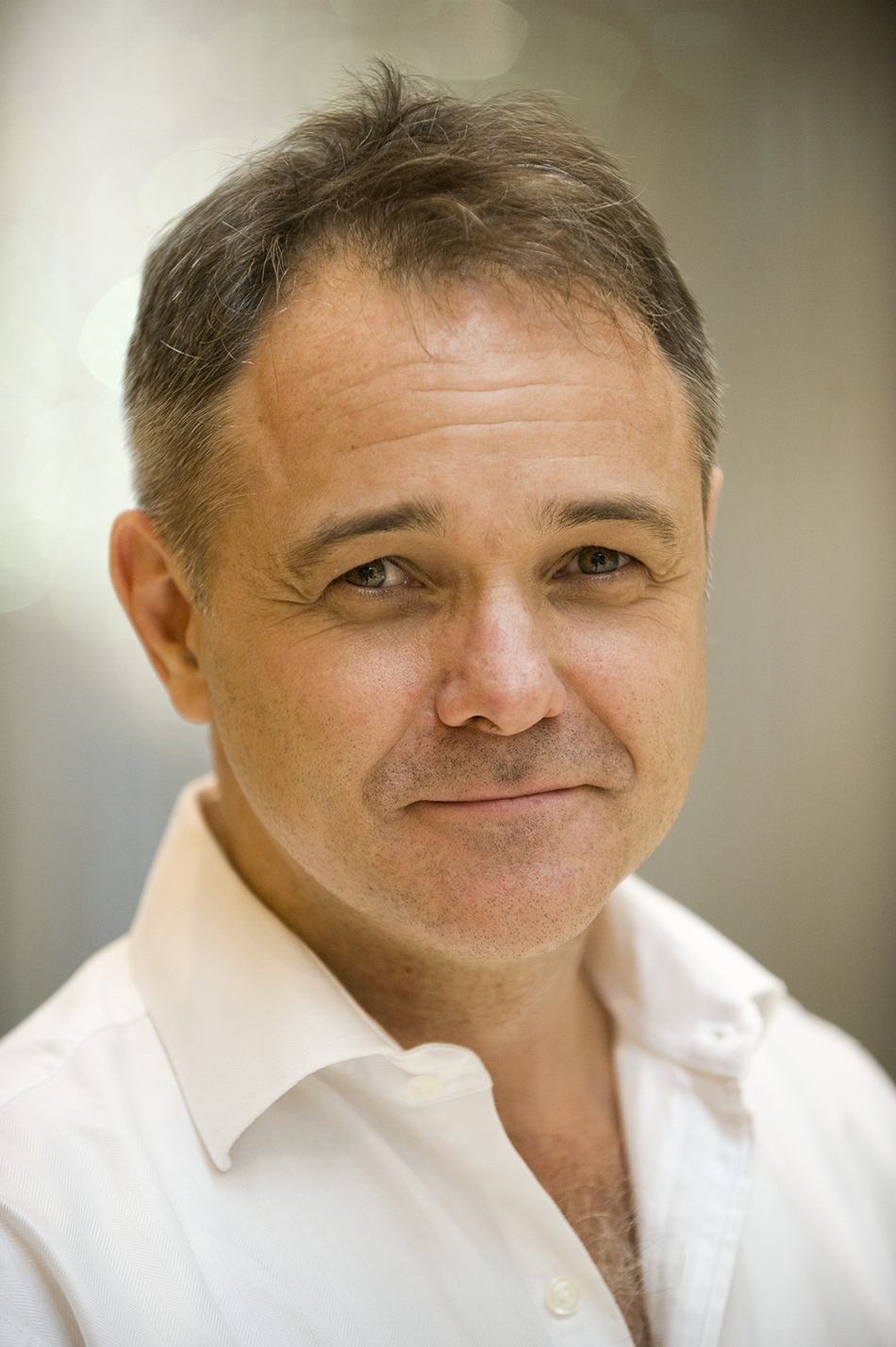
Jeremy Farrar, Chair of the WHO R&D Blueprint Scientific Advisory Group

In May 2015, in pandemic preparations prior to the COVID-19 pandemic, the WHO was asked by member organizations to create an "R&D Blueprint for Action to Prevent Epidemics" to generate ideas that would reduce the time lag between the identification of viral outbreaks and the approval of vaccines/treatments, to stop the outbreaks from turning into a "public health emergency". The focus was to be on the most serious emerging infectious diseases (EIDs) for which few preventive options were available. A group of global experts, the "R&D Blueprint Scientific Advisory Group", was assembled by the WHO to draft a shortlist of less than ten "blueprint priority diseases".

Since 2015, the shortlist of EIDs has been reviewed annually and originally included widely known diseases such as Ebola and Zika which have historically caused epidemics, as well as lesser known diseases which have potential for serious outbreaks, such as SARS, Lassa fever, Marburg virus, Rift Valley fever, and Nipah virus. Since then, COVID-19 has been added to the list.

In February 2018, after the "2018 R&D Blueprint" meeting in Geneva, the WHO added Disease X to the shortlist as a placeholder for a "knowable unknown" pathogen. The Disease X placeholder acknowledged the potential for a future epidemic that could be caused by an unknown pathogen, and by its inclusion, challenged the WHO to ensure their planning and capabilities were flexible enough to adapt to such an event.

At the 2018 announcement of the updated shortlist of blueprint priority diseases, the WHO said: "Disease X represents the knowledge that a serious international epidemic could be caused by a pathogen currently unknown to cause human disease". John-Arne Røttingen, of the R&D Blueprint Special Advisory Group, said: "History tells us that it is likely the next big outbreak will be something we have not seen before", and "It may seem strange to be adding an 'X' but the point is to make sure we prepare and plan flexibly in terms of vaccines and diagnostic tests. We want to see 'plug and play' platforms developed which will work for any or a wide number of diseases; systems that will allow us to create countermeasures at speed". US expert Anthony Fauci said: "WHO recognizes it must 'nimbly move' and this involves creating platform technologies", and that to develop such platforms, WHO would have to research entire classes of viruses, highlighting flaviviruses. He added: "If you develop an understanding of the commonalities of those, you can respond more rapidly".

== Adoption ==
Jonathan D. Quick, the author of End of Epidemics, described the WHO's act of naming Disease X as "wise in terms of communicating risk", saying "panic and complacency are the hallmarks of the world's response to infectious diseases, with complacency currently in the ascendance". Women's Health wrote that the establishment of the term "might seem like an uncool move designed to incite panic" but that the whole purpose of including it on the list was to "get it on people's radars".

Richard Hatchett of the Coalition for Epidemic Preparedness Innovations (CEPI), wrote "It might sound like science fiction, but Disease X is something we must prepare for", noting that despite the success in controlling the 2014 Western African Ebola virus epidemic, strains of the disease had returned in 2018. In February 2019, CEPI announced funding of US$34 million to the German-based CureVac biopharmaceutical company to develop an "RNA Printer prototype", that CEPI said could "prepare for rapid response to unknown pathogens (i.e., Disease X)".

Parallels were drawn with the efforts by the United States Agency for International Development (USAID) and their PREDICT program, which was designed to act as an early warning pandemic system, by sourcing and researching animal viruses in particular "hot spots" of animal-human interaction.

In September 2019, The Daily Telegraph reported on how Public Health England (PHE) had launched its own investigation for a potential Disease X in the United Kingdom from the diverse range of diseases reported in their health system; they noted that 12 novel diseases and/or viruses had been recorded by PHE in the last decade.

In October 2019 in New York, the WHO's Health Emergencies Program ran a "Disease X dummy run" to simulate a global pandemic by Disease X, for its 150 participants from various world health agencies and public health systems to better prepare and share ideas and observations for combatting such an eventuality.

In March 2020, The Lancet Infectious Diseases published a paper titled "Disease X: accelerating the development of medical countermeasures for the next pandemic", which expanded the term to include Pathogen X (the pathogen that leads to Disease X), and identified areas of product development and international coordination that would help in combatting any future Disease X.

In April 2020, The Daily Telegraph described remdesivir, a drug being trialed to combat COVID-19, as an anti-viral that Gilead Sciences started working on a decade previously to treat a future Disease X.

In August 2023, the UK Government announced the creation of a new research center, located on the Porton Down campus, which is tasked at researching pathogens with the potential to emerge as Disease X. Live viruses will be kept in specialist containment facilities in order to develop tests and potential vaccines within 100 days in case a new threat is identified.

In January 2024, during the World Economic Forum's annual meeting, Disease X was once again discussed as being a potential threat following the COVID-19 pandemic.

== Strategy ==
A paper published in 2022 listed the following strategies in preparation for Disease X:

- steps to reduce the risk of spillover and the consequent introduction and spread of a new disease in humans;
- improving disease surveillance in humans and animals, to rapidly detect and sequence the infectious agent;
- strengthening research programs to shorten the time lag between the development and production of medical countermeasures;
- rapid implementation of pharmaceutical (e.g. vaccination) and non-pharmaceutical (e.g. social distancing) measures, to contain a large-scale epidemic;
- develop international protocols to ensure fair distribution and global coverage of drugs and vaccines.

== Candidates ==
=== Zoonotic viruses ===
On the addition of Disease X in 2018, the WHO said it could come from many sources citing hemorrhagic fevers and the more recent non-polio enterovirus. However, Røttingen speculated that Disease X would be more likely to come from zoonotic transmission (an animal virus that jumps to humans), saying: "It's a natural process and it is vital that we are aware and prepare. It is probably the greatest risk". WHO special advisor Professor Marion Koopmans, also noted that the rate at which zoonotic diseases were appearing was accelerating, saying: "The intensity of animal and human contact is becoming much greater as the world develops. This makes it more likely new diseases will emerge but also modern travel and trade make it much more likely they will spread".

==== COVID-19 (2019–present) ====
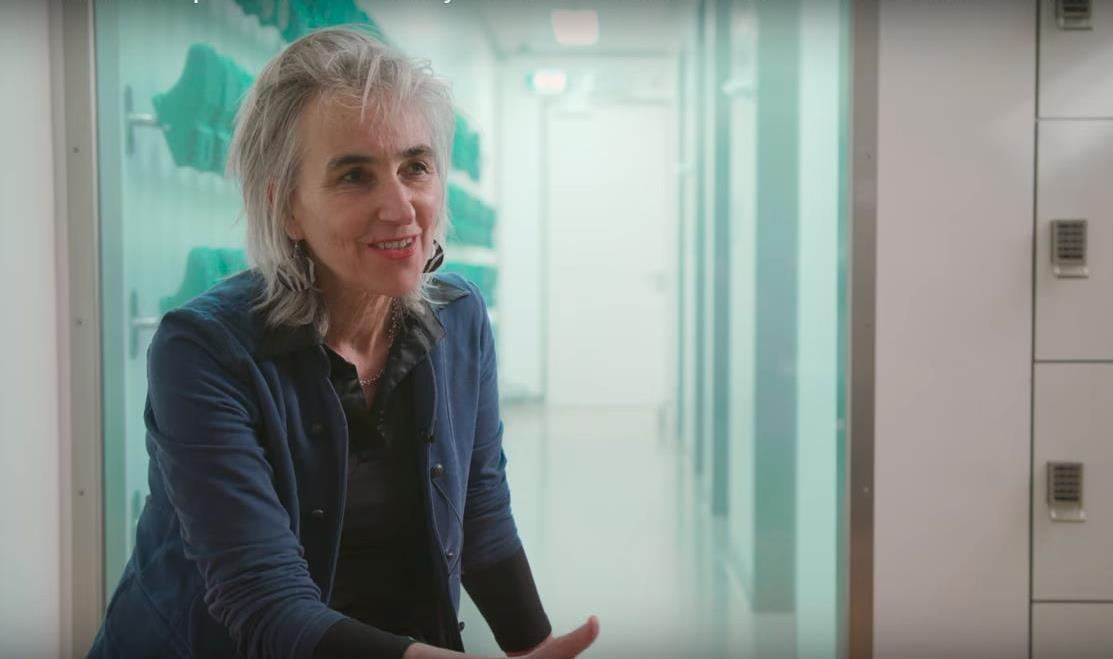
Marion Koopmans, member of the WHO R&D Blueprint Special Advisory Group

From the outset of the COVID-19 pandemic, experts have speculated whether COVID-19 met the criteria to be Disease X. In early February 2020, Chinese virologist Shi Zhengli from the Wuhan Institute of Virology wrote that the first Disease X is from a coronavirus. Later that month, Marion Koopmans, Head of Viroscience at Erasmus University Medical Center in Rotterdam, and a member of the WHO's R&D Blueprint Special Advisory Group, wrote in the scientific journal Cell, "Whether it will be contained or not, this outbreak is rapidly becoming the first true pandemic challenge that fits the disease X category". At the same time, Peter Daszak, also a member of the WHO's R&D Blueprint, wrote in an opinion piece in The New York Times saying: "In a nutshell, Covid-19 is Disease X".

=== Synthetic viruses/bioweapons ===
At the 2018 announcement of the updated shortlist of blueprint priority diseases, the media speculated that a future Disease X could be created intentionally as a biological weapon. In 2018, WHO R&D Blueprint Special Advisor Group member Røttingen was questioned about the potential of Disease X to come from the ability of gene-editing technology to produce synthetic viruses (e.g., the 2017 synthesis of Orthopoxvirus in Canada was cited), which could be released through an accident or even an act of terror. Røttingen said it was unlikely that a future Disease X would originate from a synthetic virus or a bio-weapon. However, he noted the seriousness of such an event, saying, "Synthetic biology allows for the creation of deadly new viruses. It is also the case that where you have a new disease there is no resistance in the population and that means it can spread fast".

=== Bacterial infection ===
In September 2019, Public Health England (PHE) reported that the increasing antibiotic resistance of bacteria, even to "last-resort" antibiotics such as carbapenems and colistin, could also turn into a potential Disease X, citing the antibiotic resistance in gonorrhea as an example.

== In popular culture ==
In 2018, the Museum of London ran an exhibition titled "Disease X: London's next epidemic?", hosted for the centenary of the Spanish flu epidemic from 1918.

The term features in the title of several works of fiction that involve global pandemic diseases, such as Disease (2020), and Disease X: The Outbreak (2019).

== Conspiracy theories ==
Disease X has become the subject of several conspiracy theories, claiming that it may be a real disease, or conceived as a biological weapon, or engineered to create a planned epidemic.

== See also ==
- Bioterrorism
- Coalition for Epidemic Preparedness Innovations (CEPI)
- Global Research Collaboration for Infectious Disease Preparedness (GloPIR-R)
- Synthetic virology
- Nuremberg Code
