= 2024 Kwango province malaria outbreak =

Disease outbreak in the Democratic Republic of the Congo

- Location of the main impacted province, in red
- Disease: Malaria
- Location: Kwango, Democratic Republic of the Congo
- Dates: 24 October 2024 – ongoing
- Suspected cases: 1000
- Deaths: 143

An outbreak of a severe type of malaria began in October 2024 in the southwestern region of Kwango Province, Democratic Republic of the Congo. The cause of the outbreak was initially unidentified, raising concerns that it could be a novel pathogen and leading some to refer to it as "Disease X". The outbreak has been primarily in the Panzi rural health zone and prompted investigation by local and international health organizations. By early December, between 31 to 143 deaths were reported. On 5 December, the disease was reported as having spread to Katenda, also in the Kwango Province. On 10 December, the disease was reported to have spread to Mai-Ndombe Province. From 5–12 December, 147 new cases were reported, a 30 case increase from the week before.

On 17 December, Congo's health ministry confirmed the outbreak was caused by a severe form of malaria with co-occurring respiratory illnesses, worsened by malnutrition.

== Outbreak ==
The first known case was identified on 24 October 2024, with the first recorded fatality recorded on 10 November 2024. Central authorities were only notified later, with the Ministry of Public Health of the Democratic Republic of the Congo reporting the outbreak to the World Health Organization (WHO) on 29 November 2024.

As of 8 December, cases had been reported from 9 health areas (out of 30) in the Panzi health zone: Kahumbulu, Kambandambi, Kanzangi, Kasanji, Kiama, Mbanza Kipungu, Makitapanzi, Mwini ngulu, and Tsakala Panzi. 96% of those cases were from Tsakala Panzi (169 cases), Makitapanzi (142 cases) and Kanzangi (78 cases) health areas. These areas have suffered food shortages in preceding months and have low vaccination coverage. On 10 December, the outbreak was reported by Congolese media to have spread to Mai-Ndombe Province, which is separated from Kwango by the Kinshasa Province, although this has not been confirmed by laboratory tests. The Congolese government has deployed response teams there.

The WHO reported 406 cases from 24 October – 5 December, with a peak in the week ending 9 November 2024. They also report 31 deaths, but that there were further community deaths that were yet to be investigated. According to provincial authorities, including Deputy Provincial Governor Rémy Saki, the death toll ranged from 67 to 143 individuals up to 25 November, several of whom died in their homes due to lack of medical care.

Most cases are in children, particularly those under the age of five, and cases are slightly more common in women rather than men. Most of the dead are under 15 years old.

A man who worked 500 kilometers from the documented outbreak area was hospitalized at the San Luca Hospital in Lucca, Italy, from 22 November to 3 December 2024. He was discharged upon recovery. Samples were collected and will be sent to the Istituto Superiore di Sanità for analysis.

== Symptoms ==
Those afflicted with the severe type of malaria suffered from several flu-like symptoms, including severe headache, cough, high fever, and nausea, with the addition of anemia. The 8 December WHO report gave symptom prevalences of fever (96.5%), cough (87.9%), fatigue (60.9%) and a running nose (57.8%). They also noted that the main symptoms associated with fatalities included difficulty in breathing, anemia, and signs of acute malnutrition.

The 8 December WHO report gives 31 deaths out of 406 cases, producing a case fatality ratio of 7.6%, but noted all severe cases were reported to be severely malnourished.

== Cause ==
A WHO report on 8 December 2024 reported ongoing laboratory tests to determine the cause of the disease, but noted that it is also possible more than one disease is involved. Acute pneumonia, influenza, COVID-19, measles, hemolytic uremic syndrome from E. coli, and malaria were being considered as potential causes, with malnutrition as a contributing factor. The WHO report also noted that malaria is a common disease in the area and may otherwise be contributing.

On 10 December, the WHO reported that 10 out of 12 samples tested positive for malaria. Dr Abdi Mahamud, interim director of alert and response coordination for the WHO, noted that malaria is endemic in the region and that there has been an increase in existing respiratory disease with the rainy season. He also said that the data do not show an "explosive increase" in either cases or deaths.

== Response ==
While the disease was unidentified, Kwango health minister Apollinaire Yumba implemented preliminary containment measures, including advising residents to avoid contact with deceased individuals to prevent potential transmission. Local authorities requested additional medical supplies from the international community. The health ministry warned people not to go to mass gatherings, report any suspected cases or unusual deaths, and to maintain basic hygiene and not to handle deceased bodies. They also stated the reason of the mission is to ensure immediate care, collect samples for the laboratory and to conduct deep investigations to identify the nature of the disease. Due to the rural nature of the province, the disease samples had to be taken to a laboratory 500 kilometers away, delaying results.

The World Health Organization (WHO) was alerted to the outbreak on 29 November, and stated that it was working with the health officials of the Democratic Republic of the Congo to make further investigations as to what then unknown illness was. The WHO is also sending teams to collect samples. The CDC of Africa also responded and said that they were investigating with the government of the Democratic Republic of the Congo on this issue.

While the disease was unidentified, on 5 December 2024, Hong Kong tightened health screenings at airports and at other boundary control points in response to the outbreak. On 6 December Italy's Ministry of Health asked its border offices to pay attention to people coming from the DRC, especially in ports and airports.

== See also ==
- West Africa Ebola virus epidemic
- Mpox in the Democratic Republic of the Congo
- 2025 disease outbreak in the Democratic Republic of the Congo
- 2019–2020 measles outbreak in the Democratic Republic of the Congo
- 2016 Angola and DR Congo yellow fever outbreak
- 2008 Democratic Republic of the Congo cholera outbreak
