= Thai National Institute of Health =

The Thai National Institute of Health (Thai: สถาบันวิจัยวิทยาศาสตร์สาธารณสุข) is the national health institute of Thailand.
