= Arvid Hallén =

Norwegian sociologist

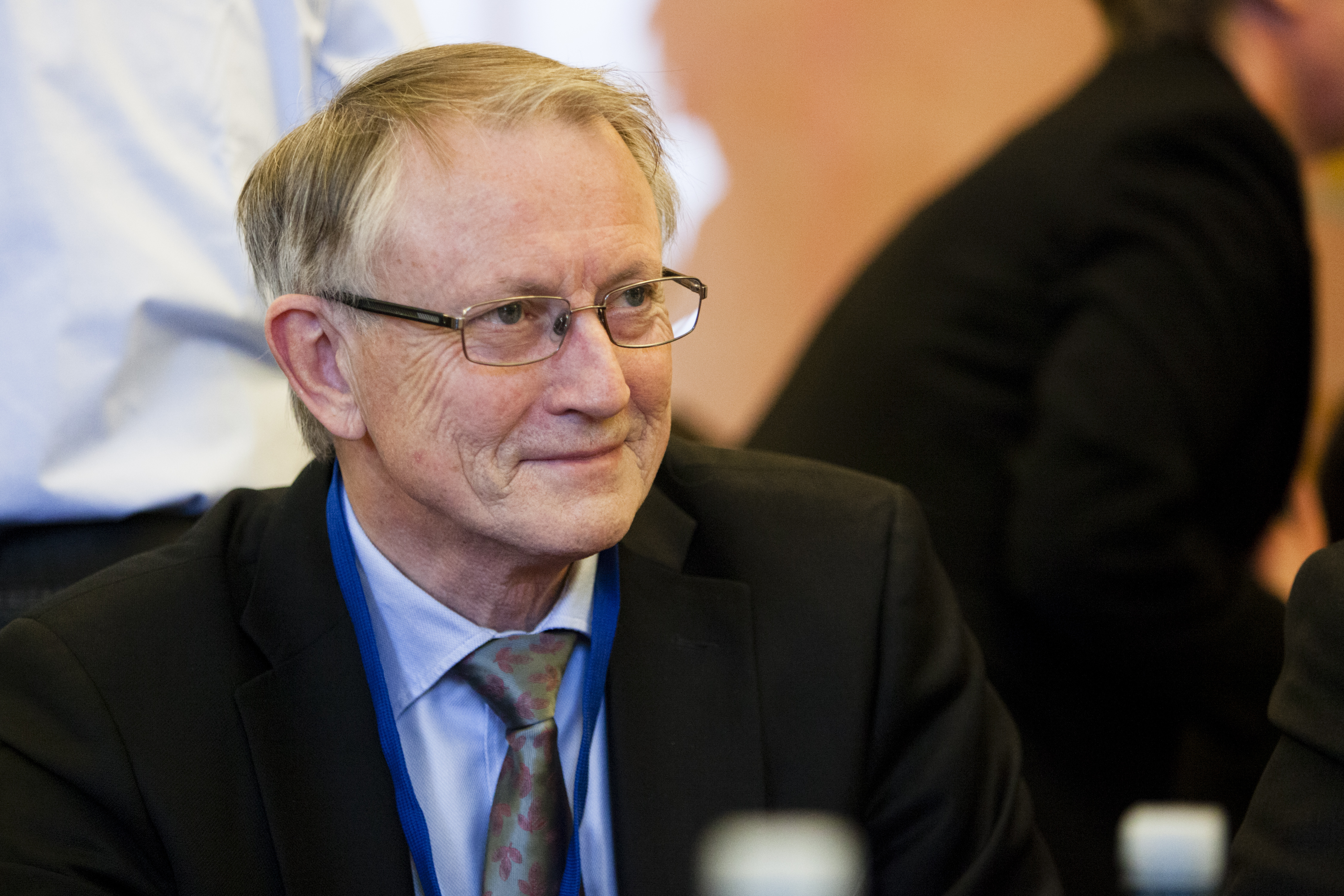
Arvid Hallén

Arvid Hallén (born 3 July 1950) is a Norwegian sociologist and the Director-General of the Research Council of Norway (since 2004).

He holds a mag.art. (PhD) degree in sociology from the University of Oslo. He served as Director of the Norwegian Institute for Urban and Regional Research from 1986 to 1995, and was employed at the institute as a researcher since 1978. He became Director for Humanities and Social Sciences in the Research Council of Norway in 1995, and Director-General in 2004.

He is a member the Norwegian Academy of Technological Sciences.

Academic offices
Preceded by Christian Hambro	Director of the Research Council of Norway; 2004–2017	Succeeded by John-Arne Røttingen
