= Boloko =

Village in the Democratic Republic of the Congo

Boloko is a village located in the Équateur Province of the Bolomba Territory, in the Democratic Republic of the Congo.

In January and February 2025, it was reported to be the epicenter of a novel viral hemorrhagic fever outbreak. By 1 March 2025, the World Health Organization concluded that water contamination might be a factor.
