= Coalition for Epidemic Preparedness Innovations =

Public-private organization for vaccine development

- Abbreviation: CEPI
- Formation: January 2017; 9 years ago
- Founders: Wellcome Trust; Bill & Melinda Gates Foundation; Government of India; Norway; World Economic Forum
- Founded at: Davos, Switzerland
- Headquarters: Oslo, Norway
- Locations: London, England; Washington, D.C., United States
- Chief executive: Richard J. Hatchett
- Key people: Jane Halton (Chair)
- Staff: 68 (2020)
- Website: CEPI.net

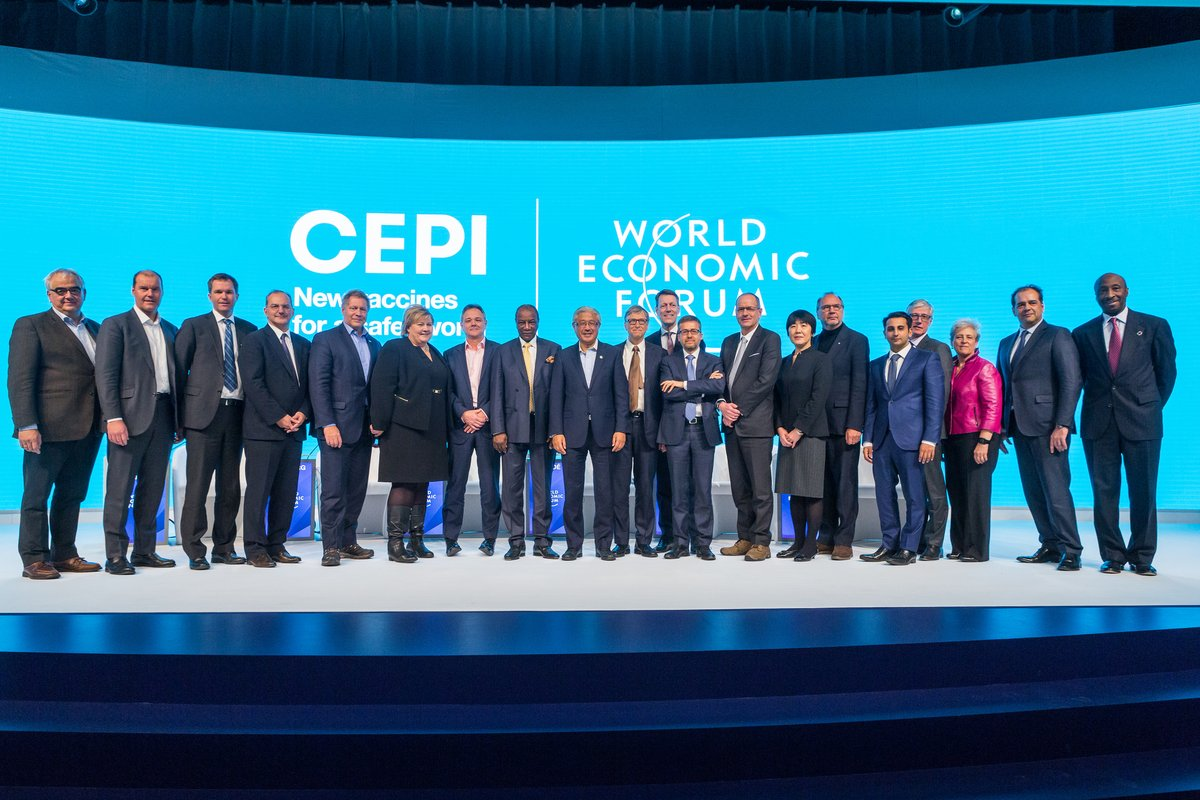
Launch of the Coalition for Epidemic Preparedness Innovations, CEPI in 2017 at the World Economic Forum in Davos, Switzerland

The Coalition for Epidemic Preparedness Innovations (CEPI) is a foundation that takes donations from public, private, philanthropic, and civil society organisations, to finance independent research projects to develop vaccines against emerging infectious diseases (EID).

CEPI is focused on the World Health Organization's (WHO) "blueprint priority diseases", which include: the Middle East respiratory syndrome-related coronavirus (MERS-CoV), the Severe acute respiratory syndrome coronavirus 2 (SARS-CoV-2), the Nipah virus, the Lassa fever virus, and the Rift Valley fever virus, as well as the Chikungunya virus and the hypothetical, unknown pathogen "Disease X". CEPI investment also requires "equitable access" to the vaccines during outbreaks, although subsequent CEPI policy changes may have compromised this criterion. In 2022, CEPI adopted a vision for the world to be able to respond to a pandemic threat with a new vaccine within 100 days.

CEPI was conceived in 2015 and formally launched in 2017 at the World Economic Forum (WEF) in Davos, Switzerland. It was co-founded and co-funded with US$460 million from the Bill and Melinda Gates Foundation, the Wellcome Trust, and the governments of India and Norway, and was later joined by the European Union (2019) and the United Kingdom (2020). CEPI is headquartered in Oslo, Norway.

== History ==
=== Founding ===
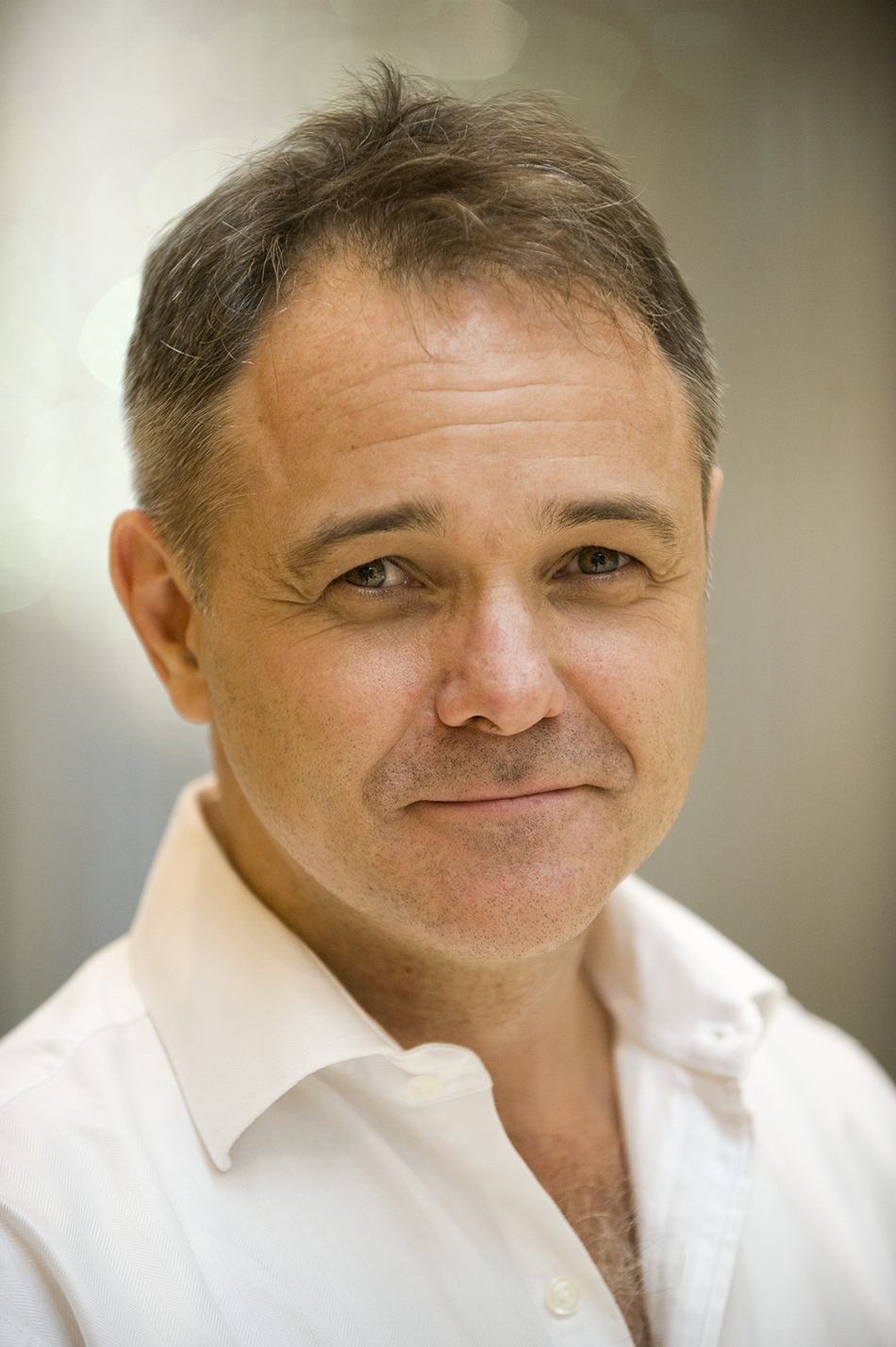
Jeremy Farrar, co-author of the concept of CEPI, and board member

The concept for CEPI was outlined in a July 2015 paper in The New England Journal of Medicine, titled "Establishing a Global Vaccine-Development Fund", co-authored by British medical researcher Jeremy Farrar (a director of Wellcome Trust), American physician Stanley A. Plotkin (co-discoverer of the Rubella vaccine), and American expert in infectious diseases Adel Mahmoud (developer of the HPV vaccine and rotavirus vaccine).

Their concept was further expanded at the 2016 WEF in Davos, where it was discussed as a solution to the problems encountered in developing and distributing a vaccine for the Western African Ebola virus epidemic. Co-founder and funder, Bill Gates said: "The market is not going to solve this problem because epidemics do not come along very often — and when they do you are not allowed to charge some huge premium price for the tools involved". CEPI's creation was also supported and co-funded by the pharmaceutical industry including GlaxoSmithKline (GSK), with CEO Sir Andrew Witty explaining at the WEF, "It is super-disruptive when the red phone rings in our vaccine division because of a health emergency. People do not realise that there's no spare capacity in the world's vaccine production system today".

CEPI was formally launched at the 2017 WEF in Davos, with an initial investment of US$460 million by a consortium that included the governments of Norway, Japan, and Germany, The Wellcome Trust, and the Gates Foundation; India joined a short time afterwards. In a launch interview with the Financial Times (FT), Gates said that a key goal was to reduce the time to develop vaccines from 10 years to less than 12 months.

The initial targets were the six EID viruses with known potential to cause major epidemics, being: MERS, Lassa fever, Nipah virus, Ebola, Marburg fever and Zika. The FT reported CEPI would "build the scientific and technological infrastructure for developing vaccines quickly against pathogens that emerge from nowhere to cause a global health crisis, such as Sars in 2002/03 and Zika in 2015/16", and fund research papers on the costs and process of vaccine development. Town & Country listed it as one of the top-10 newsworthy moments from the 2017 Davos. At launch, Norwegian physician John-Arne Røttingen, who led the steering committee for Ebola vaccine trials, served as interim CEO, and CEPI was based at the Norwegian Institute of Public Health in Oslo.

In April 2017, Richard J. Hatchett, former director of the U.S. government's Biomedical Advanced Research and Development Authority (BARDA), became the full-time CEO. Hatchett was also a member of the United States Homeland Security Council under George W. Bush, and the United States National Security Council, under Barack Obama. Also in April 2017, CEPI opened an additional office in London, and in October 2017, a further office was opened in Washington, D.C. Nature later stated, "It is by far the largest vaccine development initiative ever against viruses that are potential epidemic threats".

In 2020, CEPI was identified by several media outlets as a "key player in the race to develop a vaccine" for coronavirus disease 2019.

=== Funding ===
At its launch in 2017, CEPI announced five-year financial pledges from its founders that amounted to US$460 million and came from the sovereign governments of Japan (US$125 million), Norway (US$120 million), and Germany (US$10.6 million in 2017 alone, and which later became US$90 million), and from global foundations of the Gates Foundation (US$100 million), and the Wellcome Trust (US$100 million); India was finalising their financial commitment, which was made shortly afterward. A funding target of US$1 billion was set for the first 5 years of operation (i.e. by January 2022). The journal Nature said of the amount raised that: "It is by far the largest vaccine development initiative ever against viruses that are potential epidemic threats".

As part of its funding structure, CEPI has used "vaccine bonds" to "frontload" multi-year sovereign funding pledges. In 2019, the International Finance Facility for Immunisation (IFFIm) issued NOK 600 million in vaccine bonds to front-load the commitment by Norway, through Gavi, the Vaccine Alliance, to CEPI.

In March 2019, the European Commission granted access to CEPI into the EU's Horizon 2020 programme, and a longer-term financial funding programme. CEPI note presentations that the EU's financial commitment amounts to US$200 million, which when added to the seed amount (including the full German commitment), came to US$740 million.

By February 2020, Bloomberg News reported that CEPI had raised a total of US$760 million with additional donations from the governments of Australia, Belgium, Canada, and the U.K. Bloomberg said that "CEPI solves what economists call a 'coordination problem'. It can help pair boutique research and development companies with big vaccine manufacturers, work with regulators to streamline approval processes and resolve patent disputes on the spot. Its scientific advisory committee has executives from Pfizer, Johnson & Johnson, and Japan's Takeda Pharmaceutical, among others".

In March 2020, the British government pledged £210 million in funding to CEPI to specifically focus on a vaccine for the coronavirus; making Britain CEPI's largest individual donor.

In January 2022, The Wellcome Trust and the Bill & Melinda Gates Foundation pledged $300 million to CEPI. This is part of CEPI's effort to enable the world to reduce vaccine development timelines to 100 days.

2019 Contributions
Contributor	Category	Value million USD
Norway	Common Pool	81.7
Germany	Common Pool	39.3
Japan	Common Pool	25.0
Bill & Melinda Gates Foundation	Common Pool	20.0
EU	Chik & RVF	18.4
UK	Common Pool	13.0
Canada	Common Pool	7.5
EU	Ebola	3.7
Vulcan Inc.	Ebola	2.5
Australia	Common Pool	0.7
Wellcome Trust	Common Pool	0.1
Currency adjustment		−0.9
Total		211.0

=== Mission ===
The founding mission of CEPI was "equitable access" in pandemics: selling vaccines to developing nations at affordable prices. Affordable access to existing patented vaccines had long been a concern for the medical community, and concern mounted in the wake of the struggle to get access to vaccine in the 2013–2016 Ebola epidemic. Averting a repetition of this crisis was the motivating factor behind founding CEPI.

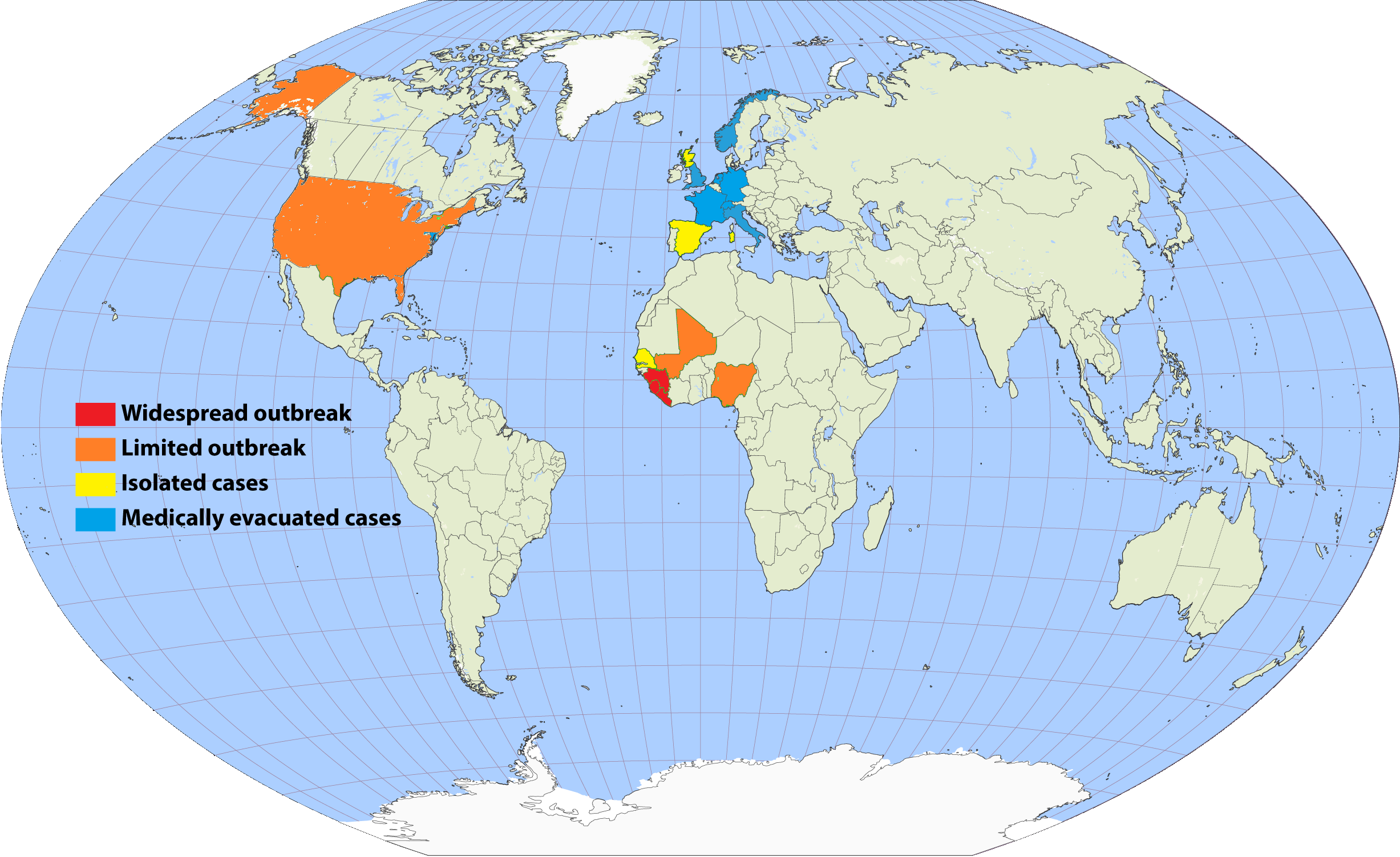
The struggle to get access to vaccine in the 2013–2016 Ebola epidemic was one of the factors motivating the creation of the CEPI.

==== Policy changes ====
CEPI's original policy contained specific measures to prevent some of these market problems. All vaccine-manufacturing contracts would need initial approval by a public review board. The policy also stated that vaccine prices would be set at levels affordable to those needing vaccines and sustainable to the manufacturer. Trade secrets would not be funded by the CEPI. Companies had to share all research data developed with CEPI funds. While CEPI would, controversially, not retain and license the intellectual property developed with CEPI funds (allowing the groups awarded funding to own it), the CEPI retained "step-in" rights: the right to license and use intellectual property developed with CEPI funds for vaccine production, even if the company that had received the funding and taken ownership of the IP later withdrew from the agreement with CEPI. The original policy also required that funded parties pre-register any trials in a clinical trials registry, publish results within a year of study completion (except with compelling reason and permission of CEPI), publish results in open-access articles, and have mechanisms for securely sharing underlying data and results, including negative results, in a way that preserves trial volunteer privacy (see AllTrials for further information).

Pharmaceutical corporations, including Johnson & Johnson, Pfizer, and Takeda, objected to the original policy, and these provisions were removed in December 2018, after the CEPI had obtained significant funding. The policy changes met with strong criticism, led by Médecins Sans Frontières. CEPI was also criticized for not following its own policies on transparency, and for removing the requirement that CEPI's board review CEPI's contracts.

The CEPI stated that its vaccines would continue to be affordable and available, and published an article discussing the changes, saying that the old policy "while reflective of the idealism that inspired the creation of CEPI, was felt by others not to be pragmatic or reflect the business realities confronted by vaccine developers". It said that several unnamed vaccine manufacturers had declared that they could not work with the CEPI under the original policy. It said that the policy change did not reflect a change in commitment to access, and CEPI would still retain the right to do research and development using intellectual property it had funded, if the old partner was unable to continue. It also said that the CEPI would retain the right to find a new manufacturer if the old manufacturer could not continue, provided the old manufacturer agrees to the transfer of the information and intellectual property to the new one.

The New York Times said that CEPI had made a "failed effort to get large pharmaceutical firms to agree to be partners without insisting on substantial profits or proprietary rights to research that CEPI helped to finance and produce," and had replaced specific implementation measures with lip service to its funding mission.

=== Reception ===
The coalition was nominated for the 2021 Nobel Peace Prize by Norwegian MP Carl-Erik Grimstad.

== Structure ==
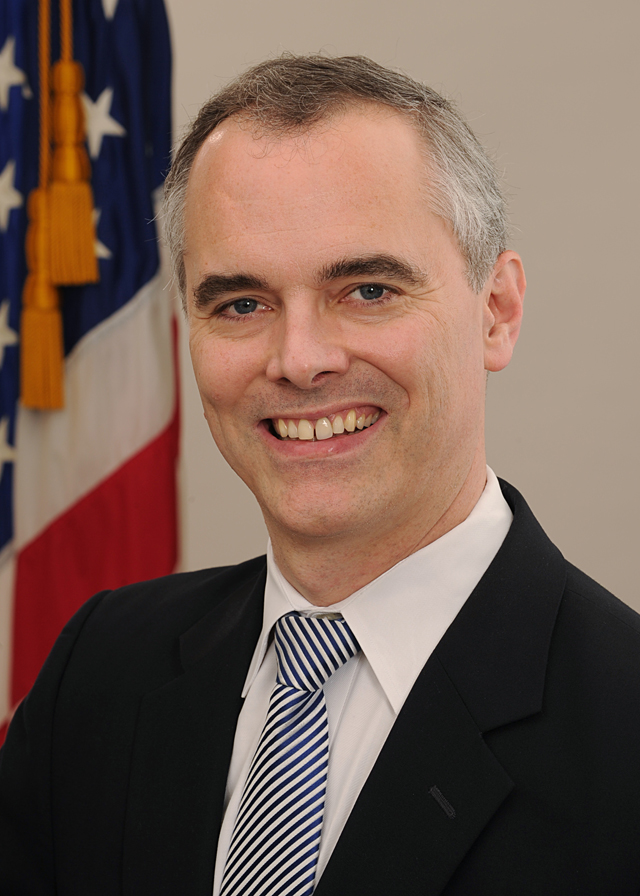
Richard J. Hatchett, CEO of CEPI from 2017

CEPI is incorporated under Norwegian law. As of March 2020, a full-time staff of 68 that runs the organisation under the direction of a chief executive officer, Richard Hatchett.

- The board consists of members, four from the Investors Council, and eight "independent members representing competencies including industry, global health, science, resource mobilization, finance."
- Scientific Advisory Committee (SAC consists of 24 voting members that provide "scientific support, advice, and guidance to the CEPI Board and Secretariat."
- Joint coordination group (JAG). The JAG is a "roundtable of independent institutions with an interest in seeing CEPI's vaccines successfully developed and deployed in an outbreak." Members of the JAG included the WHO, GAVI, European Medicines Agency, Food and Drug Administration, Médecins Sans Frontières, UNICEF, International Federation of Red Cross and Red Crescent Societies, African Vaccine Regulatory Forum, National Institute for Biological Standards and Control, and The Wellcome Trust.
- Investors Council (IC). The IC nominates four investor representatives to the board, and its approval is required for single investments over US$100 million. It included representatives from the governments of Norway, UK, Germany, Japan, Canada, Ethiopia, Australia, Belgium, the EU, and the Gates Foundation and the Wellcome Trust.

== Publications ==
In October 2018, CEPI scientists estimated that the costs of developing at least one vaccine for each of the diseases that could escalate into global humanitarian crises was between US$2.8 billion and US$3.7 billion. In November 2019, CEPI discussed its target portfolio was on the WHO's "blueprint priority diseases", that included: MERS-CoV, Nipah virus, Lassa fever virus, and Rift Valley fever virus, as well as Chikungunya virus, and the WHO's Disease X. CEPI outlined its projects to update CEPI priorities for establishment of technical and regulatory pathways for vaccine development, develop sustainable manufacturing solutions for vaccine candidates nearing completion, and create investigatory stockpiles of its vaccine candidates for use in emergency situations.

== Investments ==
=== General development ===
- In December 2018, US$8.4 million was given to Imperial College in London, to fund the development of a "self-amplifying RNA vaccine platform" that CEPI said: "would enable a tailored vaccine production against multiple viral pathogens (including H1N1 influenza, rabies virus, and Marburg virus)".
- In December 2018, US$10.6 million was given to the University of Queensland to fund the development of a "molecular clamp" vaccine platform, that CEPI described as a "transformative technology that enables targeted and rapid vaccine production against multiple viral pathogens (including influenza virus, MERS-CoV, and respiratory syncytial virus)".
- In February 2019, US$34 million was given to the German-based CureVac biopharmaceutical company, to fund the development of an "RNA Printer prototype", which CEPI described as being a "transportable, down-scaled, automated mRNA printing facility, that can produce rapidly, a supply of lipid-nanoparticle–formulated mRNA vaccine candidate that can target known pathogens (including Lassa fever, yellow fever, and rabies); and prepare for rapid response to unknown pathogens (i.e., Disease X)".
- In May 2024, US$145 million was given to BioNTech SE in order to help expand its manufacturing facility in Kigali, Rwanda, as well as African mRNA manufacturing ecosystem for equitable continent-wide distribution of and access to mRNA-based vaccines.

=== Specific vaccines ===
==== Lassa fever/MERS-CoV ====
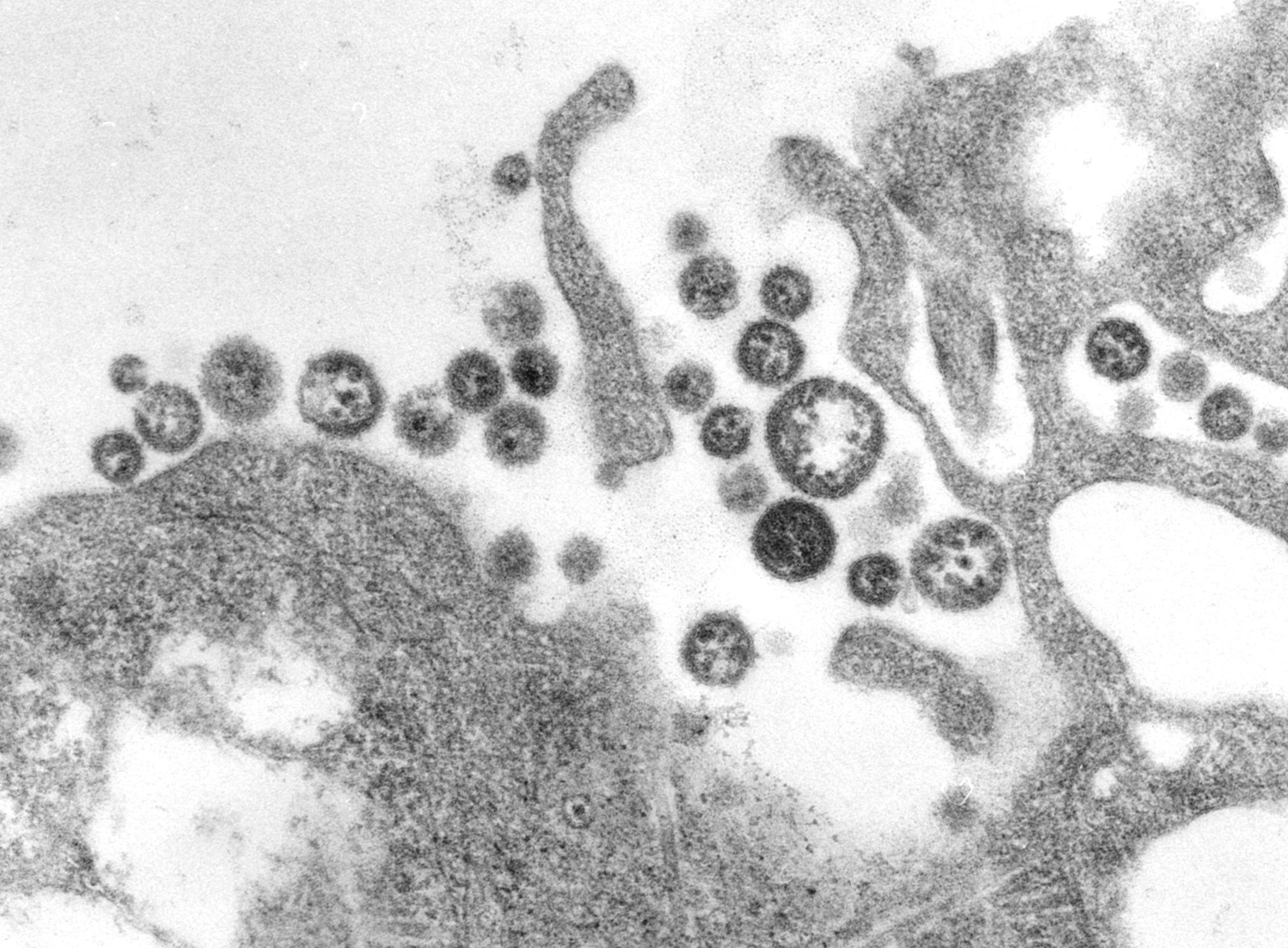
TEM of Lassa virions

- In March 2018, US$37.5 million was given to Austrian-based Themis Bioscience to fund a vaccine against Lassa virus and MERS-CoV, using a measles vector technology.
- In April 2018, US$56 million was given to U.S.-based Inovio Pharmaceuticals to fund a DNA-vaccine against Lassa virus and MERS-CoV.
- In May 2018, US$54.9 million was given to the International AIDS Vaccine Initiative (IAVI), to fund a vaccine against Lassa virus via replication-competent vesicular stomatitis viral vector technology.
- In June 2018, US$35 million was given to U.S.-based Profectus Biosciences, to fund an attenuated "VesiculoVax" vaccine against Lassa virus.
- In August 2018, US$36 million was given to German-based IDT Biologika, to fund a vaccine against MERS-CoV (only) using a recombinant modified vaccinia Ankara viral vector technology.
- In September 2018, US$19 million to Janssen Pharmaceutica and the University of Oxford, to fund a vaccine against Lassa and MERS-Cov using a simian adenoviral vaccine viral vector technology.

==== Nipah virus ====
- In May 2018, US$25 million was given to U.S.-based Profectus Biosciences, to make a recombinant protein subunit vaccine against Nipah virus.
- In February 2019, US$31 million was given to the University of Tokyo, to develop a vaccine by inserting the Nipah-virus G gene ("Malaysia strain"), into a measles vector ("Edmonston B strain").
- In August 2019, US$43.6 million was given to Public Health Vaccines LLC, to fund the development and manufacture of a vaccine using a recombinant vesicular stomatitis virus technology.

==== SARS-CoV-2 ====
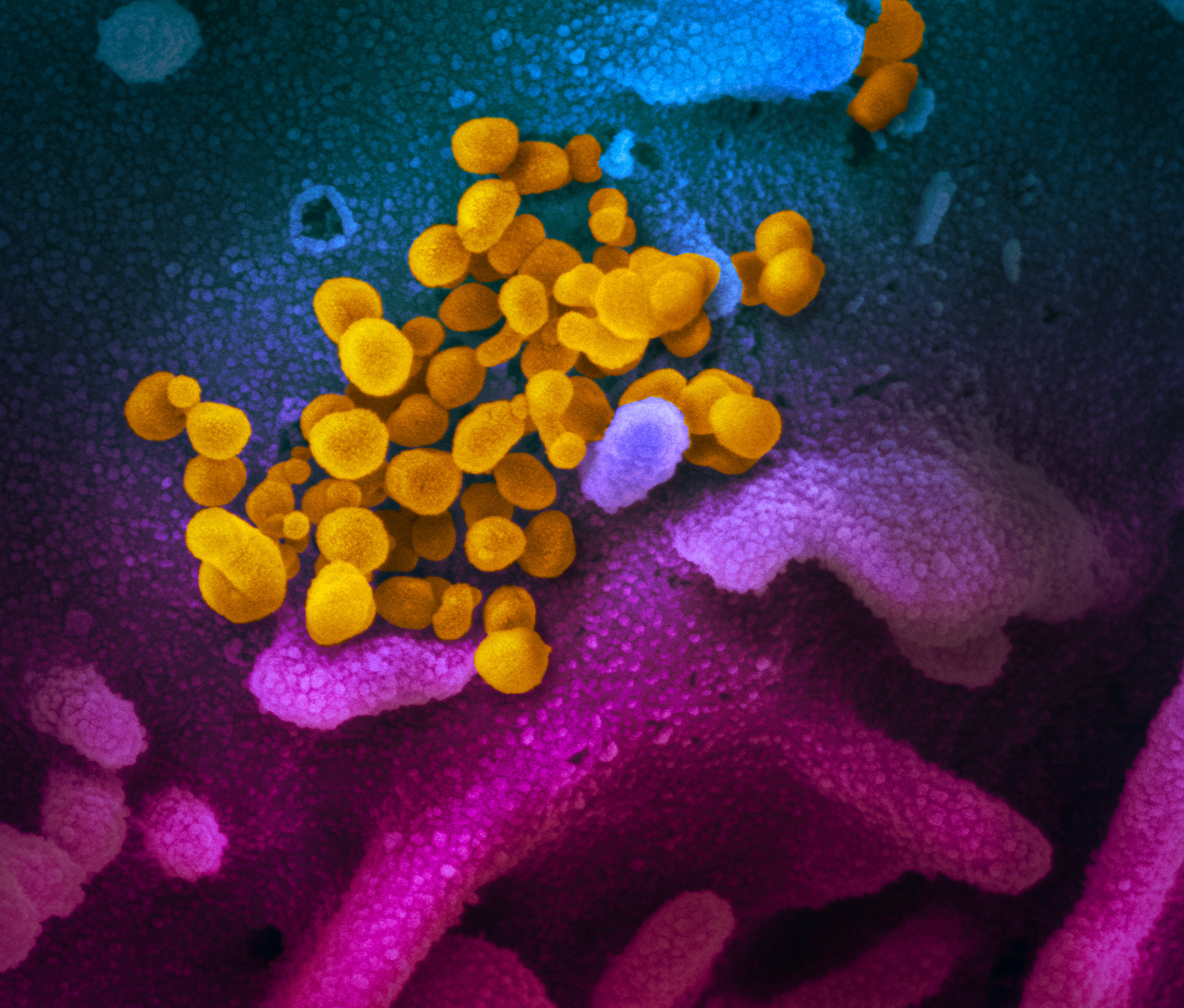
SEM of SARS-CoV-2

- In January 2020, CEPI funded three teams working on a vaccine for SARS-CoV-2, being: Moderna, Inovio Pharmaceuticals, and the University of Queensland (UQ). By February 2020, Inovio announced that it had produced a pre-clinical DNA-based vaccination to fight COVID-19 at its lab in San Diego. Inovio collaborated with a Chinese firm to speed its acceptance by regulatory authorities in China for human trialing. The strategy of the UQ team is to develop a molecular clamp vaccine that genetically modifies viral proteins to make them mimic the coronavirus and stimulate an immune reaction.
- In January 2020, CEPI announced a fourth SARS-CoV-2 project in a collaboration with their existing partner CureVac, to develop and manufacture a vaccine. CEPI's CEO, Richard J. Hachett said in an interview with the FT that CEPI expected to have human trials within 16 weeks, but cautioned "All these timelines are aggressive and aspirational. As circumstances unfold there may be opportunities to reduce the timing but it is critically important that any new vaccine is safe and effective".
- In February 2020, Bloomberg News, citing virologists, identified CEPI as a "key player in the race to develop a vaccine"; a status other media outlets have attributed. In reviewing vaccine development on the virus Vox said: "CEPI is a large part of why there are already dozens of COVID-19 vaccine candidates making their way through animal and human trials, as well as platforms to develop more", while The Guardian said CEPI was "leading efforts to finance and coordinate COVID-19 vaccine development".
- In March 2020, Hatchett gave an interview to Channel 4 News saying that "war is an appropriate analogy", for the steps needed to counter the virus, and that "this is the most frightening disease that I have ever encountered in my career, and that includes Ebola, it includes MERS, it includes SARS. And it's frightening because of the combination of infectiousness and a lethality that appears to be many-fold higher than flu". Hatchett told The Daily Telegraph that coronaviruses are the most serious threat to public health since the Spanish flu, and that a vaccine will take up to 18 months to deliver at a cost of £1.5 billion. CEPI said that its funds for fighting the virus would be fully allocated by the end of March and that it was launching a new funding call for US$2 billion to support fighting the virus.
- In March 2020, CEPI invested US$4.4 million in two more projects with Swedish vaccine laboratory Novavax, and with Oxford University, bringing its total investment in SARS-CoV-2 vaccine work to US$23.7 million, and announcing that it would invest up to US$100 million in further COVID-19 projects.
- In February 2021, CEPI launched the CIHR-CEPI Leadership Award for Excellence in Vaccine Research for Infectious Diseases of Epidemic Potential, co-administered with the Canadian Institutes of Health Research (CIHR).
- CEPI invested approximately US$65 million for the early development of the pancoronavirus vaccine candidate GBP511 to help prevent and prepare for future coronavirus-related pandemics.

==== Chikungunya virus ====
- In June 2019, US$21 million was given to Themis Bioscience to fund phase 3 clinical trials and regulatory approval of a vaccine using measles viral vector technology.
- In July 2019, US$23.4 million was given to Austrian-based biotech Valneva SE to fund manufacturing and late-stage clinical development of a single-dose, live-attenuated vaccine.
- In July 2024, Valneva received funding from the CEPI and the European Union to expand access to its newly approved chikungunya vaccine by conducting clinical trials in vulnerable groups and aiding technology transfer to produce the vaccine in low- and middle-income countries in Asia.

Monkeypox

- In September 2023, CEPI committed funding of up to $90 million to BioNTech SE in order to help expedite the development of new mRNA-based vaccine candidates against mpox.

==== Rift Valley fever ====
- In July 2019, US$12.5 million was given to Dutch-based Wageningen University and Research for a single-dose vaccine candidate for Rift Valley fever that uses an attenuated virus technology, which included: vaccine manufacturing, preclinical research, and a phase 1 study.
- In July 2019, US$9.5 million was given to Colorado State University for manufacturing and preclinical studies to assess another single-dose vaccine candidate against Rift Valley fever (also using an attenuated virus technology).

== See also ==
- Centers for Disease Control and Prevention (CDC)
- European Centre for Disease Prevention and Control
- COVID-19 vaccine
