= Yazdan Yazdanpanah =

French-Iranian infectiologist

Yazdan Yazdanpanah is an Iranian born infectiologist who is head of the Infectious Disease department at Bichat–Claude Bernard Hospital in Paris. He was Professor of Medicine at Paris Diderot University.

He became an MD from the Lille School of Medicine in 1996, obtained a Master of Science in epidemiology from the Harvard School of Public Health in 2000, and completed a PhD in public health from the Bordeaux School of Public Health in 2002.

He received the 2020 OPECST–Inserm Prize for social impact for coordinating COVID-19 research activities.

He has an h-index of 66 according to Semantic Scholar.
