= Thomas Kariuki =

Biologist (b. 1962)

Thomas Maina Kariuki
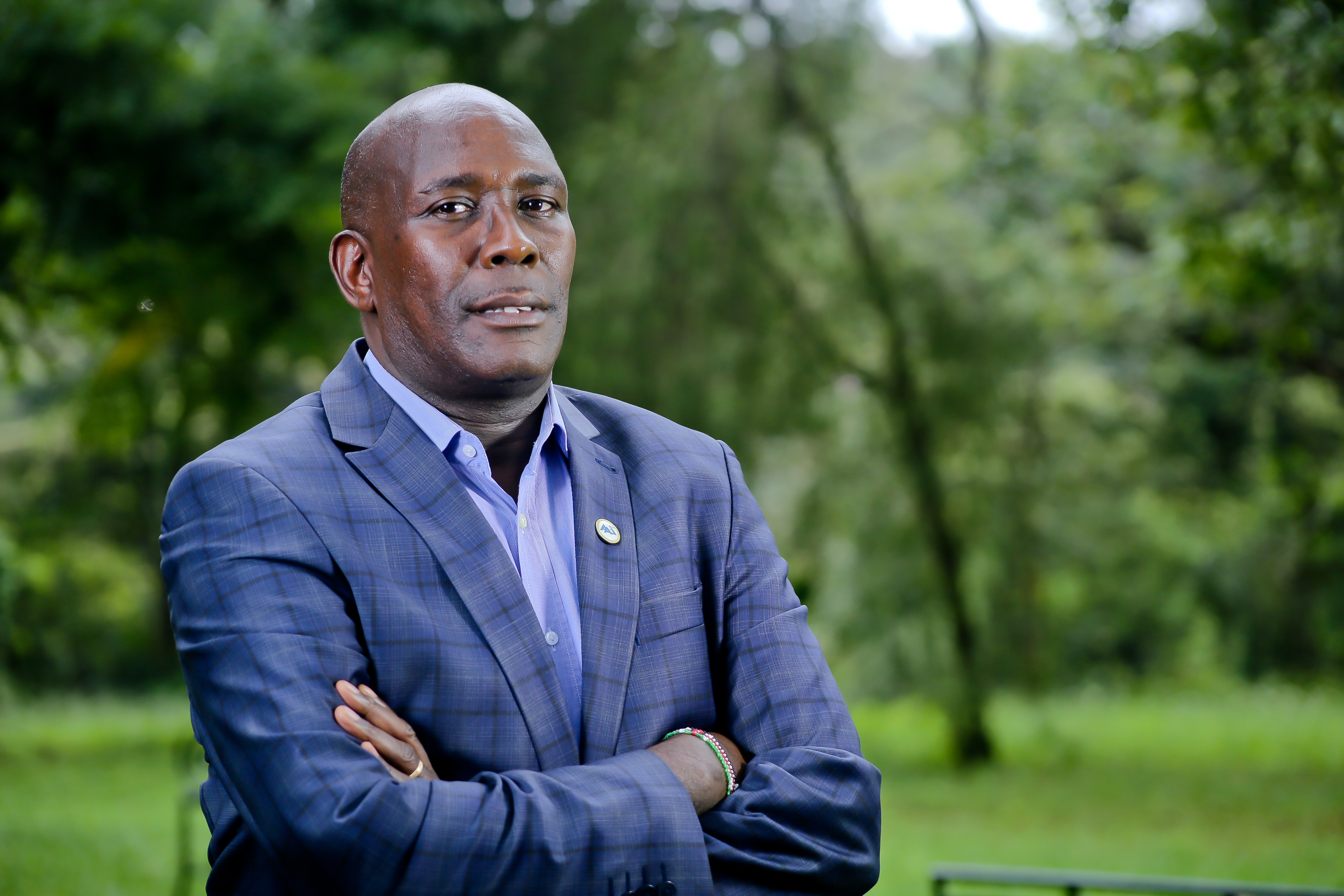
- Born: Kenya
- Education: University of Nairobi; University of York
- Scientific career
- Thesis: Vaccination strategies against schistosomes in a primate model (2004)
- Doctoral advisor: Alan Wilson

Thomas M. Kariuki is a Kenyan biologist who is Chief Executive Officer of the Science for Africa Foundation (SFA Foundation). Kariuki previously served as the Director of Programmes for the Alliance for Accelerating Excellence in Science in Africa (AESA). He was the Director of the Institute of Primate Research/National Museums of Kenya, for seven years. Kariuki’s research interests have spanned the immunology of neglected infectious diseases and he has been involved in global efforts to develop vaccines, drugs and diagnostics for poverty-related diseases. He has published on vaccines and diagnostics development for schistosomiasis (Bilharzia), malaria and co-infections and on policy issues related to biomedical research and funding. He is a Fellow of the African Academy of Sciences (AAS), Senior Fellowship of the European Foundations Initiative for Neglected Tropical Diseases, Presidential honour of the Order of Grand Warrior of Kenya (OGW) for scientific leadership and public service, Honorary Professor of Research of the Liverpool School of Tropical Medicine, LSTM.

== Life ==
Kariuki grew up in rural Kenya. Many homes in his childhood village did not have electricity or running water, until a decade ago. He notes that many roads in his home village are still not paved, but better governance and infrastructure development of rural roads are shaping many rural lives and putting them on pathways out of poverty. Kariuki obtained his undergraduate degree from the University of Nairobi. Kariuki is an alumnus of the University of Nairobi where he read biosciences, zoology, parasitology and was tutored in immunology by Jasper Mumo. He was awarded a Ph.D. in immunology from the University of York under the mentorship of Alan Wilson, titled Vaccination strategies against schistosomes in a primate model.

He is married with two daughters.

== Career ==
Kariuki served for seven years as director of the Institute of Primate Research and the National Museums of Kenya, a biomedical research and conservation biology centre. His research includes the study of infectious diseases, and enabling the development of vaccines, diagnostics, drugs for diseases that affect areas of poverty such as investigating the influence of parasitic/worm infections on vaccination outcomes. His early research work started on bovine immunology at the International Livestock Research Institute (ILRI) which is a CGIAR Nairobi based centre where he was inducted and mentored into immunology by Prof Cynthia Baldwin, who is currently based at UMass, Amherst. He also conducted joint work at IPR and was as a research associate at Case Western Reserve University in Cleveland, Ohio, with their global health team led and mentored by Chris King, focused on the vaccines and diagnostic development for schistosomiasis (Bilharzia), malaria and co-infections.

In 2017 the Liverpool School of Tropical Medicine awarded Kariuki an honorary professorship in recognition of his past and present collaborations with the school, and his efforts to "accelerate world-class research, foster innovation and promote scientific leadership in Africa". Over the years he has collaborated with teams at LSTM, where he has worked with David Molyneux researching neglected tropical diseases, with Imelda Bates who leads the LSTM Capacity Development Unit for the ongoing DELTAS Africa Learning Research Programme; and on the advisory board with the LSTM team led by Rob Harrison working on NTD Snakebite Venom.

In January 2015, Kariuki was appointed to lead the Alliance for Accelerating Excellence in Science in Africa (AESA), originally established by the African Academy of Sciences and the African Union Development Agency (AUDA-NEPAD). In his role as Director of Programmes at Alliance for Accelerating Excellence in Science in Africa (AESA), Kariuki advocated and created awareness about the importance of science in addressing Africa's health and development challenges, particularly, the rise of infectious and non-communicable diseases in Africa such as cancer, strokes, diabetes and cardiovascular disease.

In January 2022, Kariuki was appointed Chief Executive Officer of the Science for Africa Foundation (SFA Foundation), a non-profit, pan-African and charitable organisation. He is leading a team that designs and funds programmes, builds networks and partnerships to harness science and innovation to tackle major societal challenges in Africa. The SFA Foundation is implementing 10 programmes and 21 initiatives that include the Developing Excellence in Leadership, Training and Science (DELTAS Africa) supported by Wellcome and the United Kingdom Foreign, Commonwealth and Development Office (FCDO formerly DFID) to amplify Africa-led development of world-class research and scientific leaders on the continent, while strengthening African institutions.

The Grand Challenges Africa (GC Africa) is another programme implemented by the SFA Foundation. GC Africa seeks to promote Africa-led scientific innovations to help countries better achieve the Sustainable Development Goals by awarding seed and scale-up grants to solutions on the continent. GC Africa supports innovative ideas that have a potential for impact, scale and sustainability.

Kariuki sits on the advisory board for the World Health Organization (WHO) technical groups, Coalition for Epidemic Preparedness Innovations (CEPI), LSTM Advisory Board for NTD/Envenoming Group and the Gates Open Research, a platform for publication and open peer review of research funded by the Bill & Melinda Gates Foundation. He provides his expertise to shape global programmes and strategies for promoting health and science. He has previously held the position of President of the Federation of African Immunological Societies and served on the Education Committee of the International Union of Immunological Societies. He is also the founder board member of the African Research Network for NTDs (ARNTD).

Kariuki has spoken at the Women Leaders in Global Health (2020), the World Economic Forum Annual Meeting (2017 and 2019), the Grand Challenges Annual Meeting (2015-2020), the World Health Summit (Innovation for Impact Panel Discussion, 2018) and the Next Einstein Forum (Learning to lead: what capacities do scientists and researchers of tomorrow need, 2018).

== Awards and honours ==
- Fellow of The African Academy of Sciences, 2009
- Senior Fellow of the European Foundation Initiative for Neglected Tropical Diseases
- Order of Grand Warrior of Kenya for Scientific leadership and public service
- Named as Top 10 African Science Heroes in 2016 by the Planet Earth Institute
- Honorary Professorship from the Liverpool School of Tropical Medicine (2017)
