= Jonathan D. Quick =

Family physician and public health management specialist

- Education: Harvard College, University of Rochester
- Occupation(s): family physician, public health management specialist
- Known for: international health
- Notable work: The End of Epidemics: The Looming Threat to Humanity and How to Stop It

Jonathan D. Quick is a family physician and public health management specialist that focuses on global health security. He is adjunct professor of global health at Duke University in North Carolina. His book The End of Epidemics: The Looming Threat to Humanity and How to Stop It was published in 2018.

== Career ==
Quick has worked in international health since 1978. From 1989 to 1991, he worked as a health service development advisor for the Afghanistan Health Sector Support Project. From 1998 to 2004, he was director of Essential Drugs and Medicines Policy (EDM) for the World Health Organization (WHO) in Geneva. From 2004 to 2017 he was president and chief executive officer at Management Sciences for Health (MSH), transitioning to Senior Fellow in January 2017. He is a former chair of the Global Health Council, and has been a faculty member at Harvard Medical School. He is currently adjunct professor of global health at Duke University in North Carolina.

In his book The End of Epidemics: The Looming Threat to Humanity and How to Stop It, Quick "prescribed measures by which the world could protect itself against devastating disease outbreaks of the likes of the 1918 flu".

He graduated from Harvard College and University of Rochester.

== Publications ==
=== As sole author ===
- Rhinos in the Rough: a Golfer's Guide to Kenya. Nairobi: Kenway, 1993. By Tina L. Quick, Jonathan D. Quick and Robert W. Burdick. ISBN 9966-46-466-2.
- The End of Epidemics: the Looming Threat to Humanity and How to Stop It. New York: St. Martin's, 2018. ISBN 978-1250117779. With Bronwyn Fryer. With a foreword by David L. Heymann.

=== As contributor ===
- The Financial Times Guide to Executive Health: Building Your Strengths, Managing Your Risks. London: Pearson Education, 2002. ISBN 978-0273654285. Co-author.
- MDS-3: Managing Access to Medicines and Health Technologies. Management Sciences for Health, 2012.
