= Molecular clamp =

Polypeptide used to maintain the shape of proteins in experimental vaccines

A molecular clamp is a polypeptide used to maintain the shape of proteins in some experimental vaccines. On a virus, pre-fusion proteins on their surface provide an attractive target for an immune reaction. However, if these proteins are removed or made by recombinant technology, they lose their shape and form what is called a "post-fusion form". When part of a virus, these proteins maintain their form by forming a quaternary structure with other viral proteins. The pre-fusion state of the protein is a higher energy metastable state. The extra energy is used to overcome the activation barrier of the fusion to the cell membrane. The virus protein (or part of it) in combination with the clamp polypeptide is called a chimeric polypeptide.

== Molecular Mechanism ==
Pre-fusion proteins (or subunits) from the following viruses have been stabilised in experiments by the molecular clamp technique: measles, HIV, influenza, Ebola and RSV. The clamp is made from amino acid residues in a pattern that repeats after every seven residues, and must be at least 14 residues in length. The clamp self-assembles into a twin helix with one strand going forward and the other in reverse. The pairing of the amino acids in the strands is ensured by a pattern of hydrophobic and hydrophilic amino acids. The pattern is arranged so that none of the clamp will bind to the protein from the virus. The clamp self-assembles into a stiff rod. The clamp is linked to the desired part of the virus protein by a linker. The linker may serve other functions, such as allowing the chimeric protein to be purified from a mixture.

== COVID-19 Vaccine ==
Researchers at University of Queensland started to produce a vaccine using this method for SARS-CoV-2 in 2020. Development was funded by Coalition for Epidemic Preparedness Innovations which in turn received funding from the Gates Foundation as well as Norwegian, Japanese and German governments. The development of the vaccine was cancelled on 11 December 2020 during its Phase I trial, after a number of trial participants were found to give false positive test results for HIV antibodies when they did not in fact have HIV. This was due to the molecular clamp being derived from fragments of Gp41, the spike protein of HIV, leading to "a partial antibody response" to HIV. This is an undesirable outcome as it will interfere with future HIV screening tests for affected participants.

Since being abandoned as a COVID vaccine, the clamp is being re-engineered to use non-HIV proteins.
