= David Clayton =

British statistician and epidemiologist

- Born: 13 June 1944 (age 82)
- Education: Institute of Statisticians, Voorburg; King's College, Cambridge
- Awards: Guy Medal in Silver (1990); Snedecor Prize (1995)
- Scientific career
- Fields: Statistics
- Workplaces: Loughborough University; London School of Hygiene and Tropical Medicine; Royal Free Hospital; Leicester University; University of Cambridge; Wellcome Trust

David George Clayton (born 13 June 1944), is a British statistician and epidemiologist. He is titular Professor of Biostatistics in the University of Cambridge and Wellcome Trust and Juvenile Diabetes Research Foundation Principal Research Fellow in the Diabetes and Inflammation Laboratory, where he chairs the statistics group. Clayton is an ISI highly cited researcher placing him in the top 250 most cited scientists in the mathematics world over the last 20 years.

== Career ==
Clayton has worked in theoretical and applied statistics, both frequentist and Bayesian. With Norman Breslow he has published important work on generalized linear mixed models. Clayton was a pioneer in the application of MCMC methods to problems in biostatistics. More recently, he has worked in genetic epidemiology.

Clayton read Natural Sciences at King's College, Cambridge and following this worked as a researcher in ergonomics and cybernetics. He then worked as a statistician at the London School of Hygiene and Tropical Medicine, the University of Leicester and the MRC Biostatistics Unit in Cambridge before taking up his present position.

He was awarded the Guy Medal in Silver of the Royal Statistical Society in 1990 and, with Norman Breslow, the Snedecor Prize of the Committee of Presidents of Statistical Societies of North America (COPSS) in 1995. He was a lead statistician for the Wellcome Trust Case Control Consortium, a genome-wide association study.
