= Wellcome Trust =

British healthcare research charity established in 1936

- Founded: 1936; 90 years ago
- Founder: Sir Henry Wellcome
- Registration no.: 210183
- Purpose: Biomedical Research
- Headquarters: London, NW1; United Kingdom
- Location(s): Euston Road, London, NW1
- Coordinates: 51°31′32.55″N 0°8′6.07″W
- Region served: United Kingdom and overseas
- Key people: Julia Gillard (Chair); Dr. John-Arne Røttingen (Chief Executive Officer)
- Disbursements: £11 billion (1936–2015)
- Endowment: £39.9 billion
- Employees: 2,377
- Website: wellcome.org

The Wellcome Trust is a charitable foundation focused on health research based in London, United Kingdom. It was established in 1936 with legacies from the pharmaceutical magnate Henry Wellcome (founder of Burroughs Wellcome, one of the predecessors of GSK plc) to fund research to improve human and animal health. The aim of the Trust is to "support science to solve the urgent health challenges facing everyone." It had a financial endowment of £37.6 billion in 2025, making it the fourth wealthiest charitable foundation in the world. In 2012, the Wellcome Trust was described by the Financial Times as the United Kingdom's largest provider of non-governmental funding for scientific research, and one of the largest providers in the world. According to their annual report, the Wellcome Trust spent GBP £1.1 billion on charitable activities across their 2023/2024 financial year. According to the OECD, the Wellcome Trust's financing for 2023 development increased by 107% to US$887.7 million.

== Headquarters ==
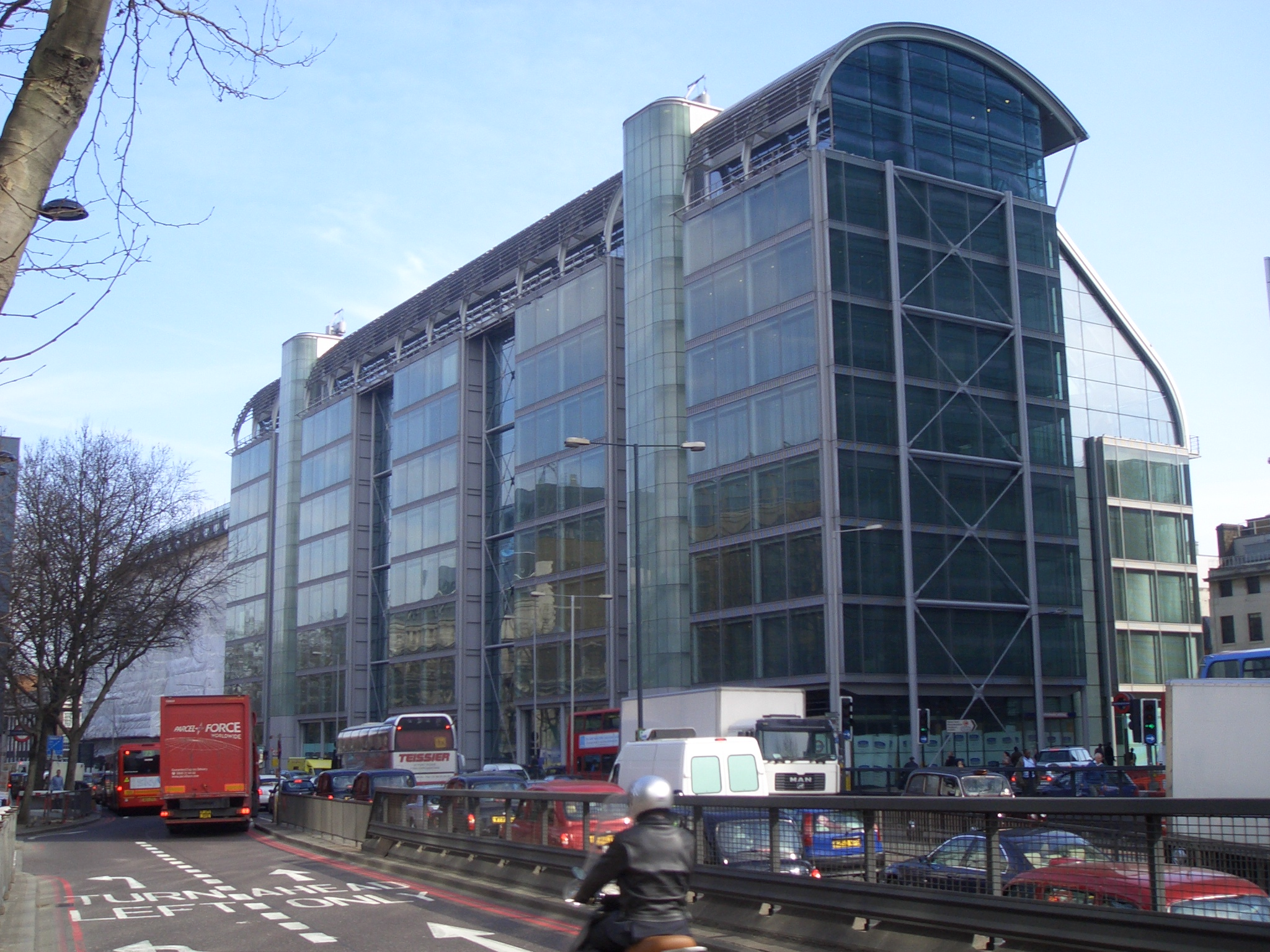
The Gibbs Building on Euston Road

The Wellcome Trust's operations are run from two buildings on Euston Road in London. The Wellcome Building, at 183 Euston Road, built in 1932 in Portland stone houses the Wellcome Collection and the adjoining glass and steel building at 215 Euston Road is the Gibbs Building, by Hopkins Architects, which opened in 2004 as the administrative headquarters of the Wellcome Trust. In 2019, the Wellcome Trust also opened an office in Berlin.

== History ==
The trust was established to administer the fortune of the American-born British pharmaceutical magnate Sir Henry Wellcome. Its income was derived from what was originally called Burroughs Wellcome, later renamed in the UK as the Wellcome Foundation Ltd. In 1986, the trust sold 25% of Wellcome plc stock to the public. Overseen by incoming Director of Finance Ian Macgregor, this marked the beginning of a period of financial growth that saw the trust's value increase by almost £14 billion in 14 years, as their interests moved beyond the bounds of the pharmaceutical industry.

In 1995, the trust divested itself of any interest in pharmaceuticals by selling all remaining stock to Glaxo plc, the company's historic British rival, creating GlaxoWellcome plc. In 2000, the Wellcome name disappeared from the drug business altogether when GlaxoWellcome merged with SmithKline Beecham, to form GlaxoSmithKline plc.

== Activities ==
=== Biomedical research ===
==== Major investments ====
The Trust funds or co-funds a number of major biomedical research initiatives:

- Avon Longitudinal Study of Parents and Children (ALSPAC), a cohort study of children born in England during 1991 and 1992.
- The Cancer Genome Project at the Wellcome Trust Sanger Institute.
- The Diamond Light Source, the UK's national synchrotron science facility in Oxfordshire.
- Developing Excellence in Leadership, Training and Science Initiative (DELTAS), a collaboration with the Department for International Development (DFID) to establish cutting-edge research and training programmes across the African continent.
- The Ebola Emergency Initiative, a fast-tracked research programme with the goal of identifying clinical and public health interventions to counter the West African Ebola Epidemic.
- The Juvenile Diabetes Research Foundation/ Wellcome Trust Diabetes and Inflammation Laboratory facilitates research into the genetic component of type 1 diabetes and is based in the Cambridge Institute for Medical Research.
- The Seeding Drug Discovery Initiative.
- The Structural Genomics Consortium, an international organisation focussing on three-dimensional structures of proteins of medical relevance with an emphasis on open data.
- The Wellcome Trust Sanger Institute, a non-profit, British genomics and genetics research institute.
- UK Biobank.

==== Asia and Africa Programmes ====
- The KEMRI-Wellcome Trust Research Programme, established in 1989 in partnership with the Kenya Medical Research Institute.
- The Malawi-Liverpool-Wellcome Trust Clinical Research Programme, was established in 1995.
- The Africa Centre for Health and Population Studies in South Africa now known as AHRI African Health Research Institute, established in 1998 in partnership with the South African Medical Research Council.
- The Wellcome Trust-Mahidol University-Oxford Tropical Medicine Research Programme in partnership with the Faculty of Tropical Medicine, Mahidol University, researching in Thailand and Laos and was established in 1979.
- The Vietnam Research Programme and Oxford University Clinical Research Unit in Ho Chi Minh City and Hanoi.

==== Seeding Drug Discovery Initiative ====
Also known as SDDI, this five-year initiative started in October 2005 with the remit "to facilitate the development of drug-like small molecules that address unmet medical needs." SDDI was based in London and managed by Richard Davis. Through early 2010, SDDI had provided more than £80 million across 30 projects split between academic institutions and companies. To early 2010, all but one of the company recipients were either start-ups or spin-outs. In May 2010, an additional £110 million was added to the SDDI fund with the intent to extend the initiative for an additional five years.

===== Supporting global research and development in COVID-19 =====
The Wellcome Trust announced the need for at least $8 billion of new funding for research, development, and supply of treatments related to COVID-19. Wellcome Trust collaborated with the Bill & Melinda Gates Foundation and Mastercard to fund the COVID-19 Therapeutics Accelerator, launching in March 2020 with an initial $125 million in backing.

=== Improving research culture ===
In September 2019, Wellcome launched an initiative to reimagine research and improve the culture in which research is conducted. Current incentive structures and, as a result, culture and practices, prioritise publication outputs above all else. This is damaging people's wellbeing and undermining the quality of research itself.

=== Support for open access and open data ===
The Wellcome Trust plays an important role in encouraging publication of research in open access repositories such as Europe PubMed Central (EuropePMC). The Wellcome Trust believes that maximising the distribution of these papers – by providing free, online access – is the most effective way of ensuring that the research can be accessed, read and built upon. In turn, this will foster a richer research culture.

In 2016, the Wellcome Trust partnered with the US National Institutes of Health (NIH) and the Howard Hughes Medical Institute to launch the Open Science Prize to "help develop services, tools and platforms that enable open content to be discovered, assessed and re-used in ways that will advance discovery and spark innovation."

In 2016, Wellcome Trust announced that it would be launching Wellcome Open Research, an open access publication system running on the F1000 Research platform. Article processing charges will be covered directly by Wellcome Trust. Papers from the system are now indexed in PubMed Central.

=== Membership in the Global Health Innovative Technology Fund (GHIT) ===
In the summer of 2015, the Wellcome Trust joined the Japanese government, 7 Japanese pharmaceutical and diagnostics companies, The Bill and Melinda Gates Foundation, and the United Nations Development Program as funding partner of the Global Health Innovative Technology Fund (GHIT), which funds scientific research and development for anti-infectives and diagnostics for diseases that primarily affect the developing world.

=== Public engagement and the Wellcome Collection ===
In June 2007, the Wellcome Building reopened after refurbishment as a public venue, housing the Wellcome Collection, the Wellcome Trust Centre for the History of Medicine at University College London and the Wellcome Library. The aim of the Wellcome Collection is to enhance public understanding of medical science and history. The building contains gallery spaces, conference facilities, space for debates, drama and workshops, a café and a bookshop. The galleries show a small sample of works from Sir Henry Wellcome's collection, and host a programme of events and exhibitions. The Wellcome Collection and exhibitions are open to the public free of charge six days a week.

The Wellcome Collection and Wellcome Library are members of the London Museums of Health & Medicine.

==== Wellcome Photography Prize ====
The Wellcome Trust runs an annual photography prize which aims to explore "the human side of three urgent health challenges". Judges in 2021 include Dr Dixon Chabanda, Sir Jeremy Farrar, Dr Katerina Srahulkova and Azu Nwagbogu. Winners in each category receive a prize of £10,000.

==== Wellcome Book Prize ====
The Wellcome Trust sponsors an annual book prize, the Wellcome Book Prize, which "aims to excite public interest and encourage debate" around medicine and health.

=== Wellcome Global Monitor ===
Share agrees vaccines are important wellcome

In June 2019, Wellcome released the results of the 2018 global survey on public attitudes toward science and health. Topics include trust of scientists, doctors, and nurses; religion and science, and vaccines, among others. It was Wellcome's first Global Monitor and was intended to "provide robust evidence on how public attitudes vary across different demographic groups and countries."

== Investments ==
In August 2014, the Wellcome Trust bought the Co-operative Group's farm business (renamed Farmcare) for £249 million. This comprised "15,997 hectares (39,533 acres) of freehold and third party owned land, 15 farms, including three pack houses, over 100 residential properties, and 27 commercial properties."

In 2015, the trust bought the Premier Marinas group.

== Criticisms ==
It has been reported that the Wellcome Trust has billions of investments in companies related to the problems the philanthropy wants to solve. In the context of the COVID-19 pandemic, the trust has investments in pharmaceutical companies involved in the development and delivery of treatments for COVID-19, which means it has the potential to gain financially where those treatments are monetised.

The Wellcome Trust has been criticised for seeking to develop large scale housing estates on green countryside in the South of England as part of its investment portfolio. Campaign groups consider that environmental destruction from overdevelopment, alongside concerns over the ability of rural services such as drainage, healthcare and education to cope with increased levels of development, is contributing to the destruction of rural life and generating the type of mental stress issues the charity is supposed to be combating.

== Directors ==
- Peter Williams, 1967–1991
- Bridget Ogilvie, 1991–1998
- Michael Dexter, 1998–2003
- Mark Walport, 2003–2013
- Jeremy Farrar, 2013–2023
- John-Arne Røttingen, 2024–

== See also ==
- Heads of International Research Organizations
- List of wealthiest charitable foundations
