= COVID-19 vaccination in South Korea =

Plan to immunize against COVID-19

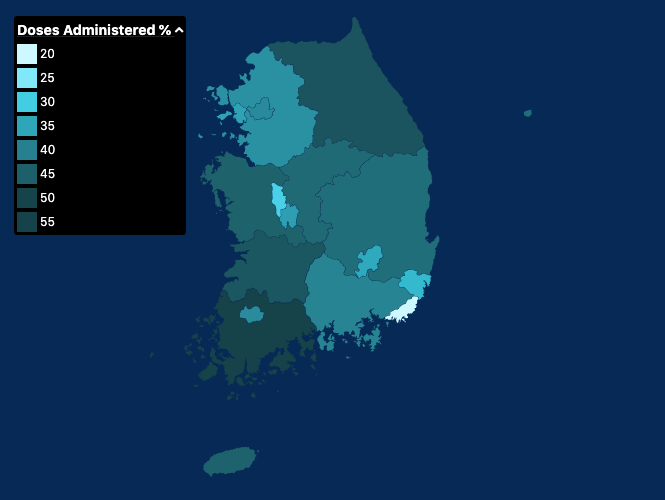
- South Korea. Percentage with total doses given as of 9 November 2023.
- Date: 26 February 2021 – 13 April 2023
- Location: South Korea
- Cause: COVID-19 pandemic in South Korea

COVID-19 vaccination in South Korea was a mass immunization campaign against severe acute respiratory syndrome coronavirus 2 (SARS-CoV-2), the virus that causes coronavirus disease 2019 (COVID-19), in response to the ongoing pandemic in the country.

== Vaccination program ==
Daily updates are provided by Korea Disease Control and Prevention Agency.

As of 5 July 2021, due to vaccine shortages, the vaccination rate has been slowed down since 20 June. The vaccination rate remains 29% for more than two weeks. According to JoongAng Ilbo, as of 5 July, the remaining amount of the COVID-19 vaccine is 1.8 million doses, including 1.4 million from Pfizer.

On 6 July 2021, it is reported that South Korea has signed a deal with Israel to borrow 700,000 expiring doses of the Pfizer-BioNTech's vaccine. South Korea will return the same amount of vaccines to Israel around September or October of this year.

On 29 November 2021, President Moon Jae-in urged the rapid administration of booster shots against COVID-19, in response to an increased number of severe cases and deaths following the easing of anti-virus rules.

== Background ==
On 10 February 2021, South Korea granted its first approval of a COVID-19 vaccine to Oxford–AstraZeneca, allowing the two-shot regimen to be administered to all adults, including the elderly. The approval came with a warning, however, that consideration is needed when administering the vaccine to individuals over 65 years of age due to limited data from that demographic in clinical trials.

On 14 April 2021, The additional 250,000 doses of Pfizer/BioNTech vaccines arrived in the country.

On 3 June 2021, the United States donated one million doses of Johnson & Johnson's vaccine to South Korea. The United States initially announced to donate 550,000 doses to South Korean troops working in close contact with American forces.

On 19 August 2021, Romania decided to donate 450,000 expiring Moderna vaccines to South Korea.

=== Vaccines on order ===
Vaccine dose	Progress	Doses ordered	Manufacturer	Remarks
Oxford-AstraZeneca	Approved for use	20 million	(South Korea) SK Bioscience	-
Oxford-AstraZeneca	Approved for use	up to 2.6 million	(South Korea) SK Bioscience (Italy) Catalent	COVAX
Pfizer–BioNTech	Approved for use	96 million	(Belgium) Pfizer	-
Pfizer–BioNTech	Approved for use	up to 0.4 million	(Belgium) Pfizer	COVAX
Pfizer–BioNTech	Approved for use	0.7 million	(Belgium) Pfizer	Vaccine swap from Israel
Pfizer–BioNTech	Approved for use	1 million	(Belgium) Pfizer	Vaccine swap from Romania
Janssen	Approved for use	6 million	(United States) Emergent BioSolutions	-
Janssen	Approved for use	1.4 million	(United States) Emergent BioSolutions	An offer from the United States
Moderna	Approved for use	40 million	(Switzerland) Lonza (South Korea) Samsung Biologics	-
Moderna	Approved for use	0.4 million	(Switzerland) Lonza	An offer from Romania
Novavax	Approved for use	40 million	(South Korea) SK Bioscience	-
Sputnik V	Pre-review	None	(South Korea) Hankook Korus Pharm	-
SKYCovione	Approved for use	10 million	(South Korea) SK Bioscience	-

=== Timetable ===
Vaccine	Manufacturer	Submitted	EUA	Approval	Deployment
Oxford-AstraZeneca	(South Korea) SK Bioscience	4 January 2021	None	10 February 2021	26 February 2021
Oxford-AstraZeneca	(Italy) Catalent	4 January 2021	12 May 2021	21 May 2021	14 May 2021
Pfizer–BioNTech	(Belgium) Pfizer	25 January 2021	3 February 2021	5 March 2021	27 February 2021
Janssen	(United States) Emergent BioSolutions	27 February 2021	None	7 April 2021	10 June 2021
Moderna	(Switzerland) Lonza	12 April 2021	None	21 May 2021	17 June 2021
Moderna	(South Korea) Samsung Biologics	Pending	Pending	Pending	Pending
Novavax	(South Korea) SK Bioscience	Pending	Pending	Pending	Pending

=== Production ===
AstraZeneca signed a deal with South Korea's SK Bioscience to manufacture its vaccine products. The collaboration calls for the SK Bioscience to manufacture AZD1222 for local and global markets. The World Health Organization approved AstraZeneca's COVID-19 vaccine for emergency use on February. The initial approval covers doses produced by AstraZeneca and South Korea's SK Bioscience.

South Korea's Korus Pharm has formed a consortium to produce Russia's Sputnik V COVID-19 vaccine. the consortium will produce 500 million doses of the vaccine. However, The Sputnik V doses manufactured in South Korea are not for domestic use. The vaccine is to be exported to Russia and UAE.

Novavax will license out its NVX-CoV2373 vaccine technology to SK Bioscience for contract manufacturing purposes. SK Bioscience will manufacture 40 million doses of Novavax vaccines.

=== Vaccines in trial stage ===
On 9 November 2023, SK Bioscience submitted investigational new drug for GBP510 COVID-19 vaccine candidate to Korea Ministry of Food and Drug Safety, for Phase III clinical trial. SK Bioscience plans its Phase III trial in form of comparative effectiveness clinical trial, targeting 4,000 people in South Korea.

Vaccine	Type (technology)	Phase I	Phase II	Phase III
INO-4800	DNA	Completed	Completed	In progress
GX-19 (GX-19N)	DNA	Completed	In progress	In progress
EuCorVac-19	Subunit	Completed	In progress	Not Yet
GBP510	Subunit	Completed	Completed	In progress
AdCLD-CoV19	Viral vector	Completed	In progress	Not Yet
GLS-5310	DNA	Completed	In progress	Not Yet
NBP2001	Subunit	Completed	Not Yet	Not Yet
EG-COVID	mRNA	In progress	In progress	Not Yet
IN-B009	Subunit	In progress	Not Yet	Not Yet
