= GBP511 =

Universal coronavirus vaccine candidate

Vaccine description
- Target: SARS-related coronavirus
- Vaccine type: Protein nanoparticle

Clinical data
- Routes of administration: Intramuscular

GBP511 is a self-assembling protein nanoparticle-based universal coronavirus vaccine candidate developed to provide broad, multivalent protection against the sarbecovirus subgenus, which includes SARS-CoV-2 (the cause of COVID-19), SARS-CoV-1 (the cause of SARS), and various animal-borne coronaviruses with pandemic potential. It was developed through a collaboration between the University of Washington's Institute for Protein Design and the South Korean pharmaceutical company SK Bioscience. GBP511 represents the first vaccine targeting the entire SARS virus family to enter Phase I/II human clinical trials.

== Design ==
The vaccine utilizes a self-assembling protein nanoparticle platform that was originally developed at the University of Washington and incorporates technology from the SKYCovione vaccine. This "mosaic" strategy involves attaching multiple receptor-binding domains (RBDs) from different coronaviruses onto a single computer-designed protein core. By presenting the immune system with diverse but related antigens simultaneously, the vaccine is intended to train B-cells to recognize conserved features shared across the sarbecovirus family, rather than focusing on a single strain. The antigens used by GBP511 include RBDs from two variants of SARS-CoV-2, one from SARS-CoV-1, and one from bat coronavirus BtKY72.

== Development ==
=== Funding ===
The early development of GBP511 received approximately US$65 million from the Coalition for Epidemic Preparedness Innovations (CEPI) to help prevent and prepare for future pandemics.

=== Preclinical studies ===
Preclinical studies of GBP511 demonstrated that the vaccine could elicit broad neutralizing antibody responses and protect animals against coronaviruses to which they were not directly immunized, including reducing viral replication in the lungs of mice challenged with SARS-CoV-1.

=== Clinical trials ===
==== Phase I/II ====
In early 2026, SK Bioscience initiated a combined Phase I/II clinical trial across two sites in Western Australia. The study is designed to enroll approximately 368 healthy adult participants to evaluate the vaccine's safety, tolerability, and immunogenicity.

During the initial phase, participants are administered two doses spaced 28 days apart. The trial investigates multiple dosage groups, testing formulations both with and without an adjuvant to enhance immune response. The mRNA vaccine Comirnaty is utilized as a comparator throughout the study. While the primary completion date is estimated for December 2026, full completion of the Phase I/II trial is expected by September 2028.
