= Skycovione =

Vaccine candidate against COVID-19

Vaccine description
- Target: SARS-CoV-2
- Vaccine type: Protein subunit

Clinical data
- Other names: GBP510, Skycovion
- Routes of administration: Intramuscular

Identifiers
- CAS Number: 2696258-42-9

Skycovione is a COVID-19 vaccine candidate developed by SK Bioscience and the Institute for Protein Design of the University of Washington, It is South Korea's first homegrown COVID-19 vaccine and utilizes GSK's AS03 adjuvant technology.

== Trials and regulation ==
The phase III clinical trial involves 4,037 participants. In April 2022, results of the phase III trial confirmed the vaccine to be safe and effective. It elicited approximately three times more antibodies than the Oxford–AstraZeneca COVID-19 vaccine. The South Korean Government has ordered 10 million doses for domestic use.

The Korean Ministry of Food and Drug Safety released the results of their review on SK Bioscience's Skycovione on June 27, 2022, and said the data was sufficient for approval. According to the Korean Ministry of Food and Drug Safety, vaccine-related adverse events occurred in 13.3% of the vaccine group. In the control group, the adverse event rate was about 14.6%, which was not different from the vaccine group. Serious adverse events occurred in 0.5% in the vaccine group and 0.5% in the control group. There was one adverse event of glomerulonephritis which could not be excluded from vaccine association.

On June 29, 2022, Skycovione was approved for use in South Korea. The vaccine needs an additional safety review because "the number of participants in Skycovione's trial was only one-tenth of other vaccine trials".

== Suspension and discarding of supplies ==
In November 2022, the production of SKYCovione was indefinitely suspended because of low demand for the vaccine. The South Korean government purchased 10 million doses of SKYCovione, of which 600,000 doses released into hospitals. However, only 3,787 shots of them have been administered as of November 2022. Unused doses of the vaccine are likely to be discarded.

In September 2023, SK Bioscience withdrew the application for marketing authorization in the EU.

== Emergency use ==
In June 2023, SkyCovione received an Emergency Use Listing (EUL) from the World Health Organization, which allows for time-limited emergency use of the vaccine. It was the 12th COVID-19 vaccine granted an EUL by the WHO, and it was also approved in the UK.

It was delisted by WHO in May 2024.

== See also ==
- GBP511, a universal coronavirus vaccine candidate that is based on the SKYCovione platform
