= Cowboy Bebop (1998 video game) =

- Developer: BEC
- Publisher: Bandai
- Programmer: Akiyoshi Masuda
- Composer: Shinsuke Sugiuchi
- Platform: PlayStation
- Release: JP: May 14, 1998
- Genre: Action
- Mode: Single-player

Cowboy Bebop (カウボーイビバップ, Kaubōi Bibappu) is a 1998 action game developed by BEC and published by Bandai for the PlayStation. It is based on the 1998–99 anime television series of the same name.

The game was never released outside Japan.

== Gameplay ==
The player controls Spike Spiegel's Swordfish II from a third-person perspective. Each level involves chasing another ship (the bounty head) along a set track through different environments, while enemies (spaceships, robots, etc.) attack. Each stage ends with a boss battle, where the player confronts their target.

Between stages, bonus points earned can be used to purchase upgrades for the ship (faster speed, more powerful ammo, stronger laser).

== Cast ==
In the same way that characters interacted with the player in Star Fox, series regulars Faye Valentine, Jet Black, and Radical Edward appear on screen to offer advice. Each character is voiced by their original Japanese voice actor. Other series regular Ein also occasionally appears.

== Music ==
Shinsuke Sugiuchi composed the soundtrack for the game which greatly diverges from the TV show in style.

== Reception ==
Reception

Review score
Publication	Score
Dengeki PlayStation	40/100, 45/100

MAN!AC gave a rating of 52% and said the graphics are pixelated and jerky. The game's biggest weakness was said to be how difficult it was to dodge enemy gunfire. Fun Generation gave a rating of "playable". They criticized the enemy AI and the controls and recommended it only for hardcore collectors. EX gave a rating of 1.5 out of 4 and said it's a disappointing and poorly made game.
