= List of Cowboy Bebop characters =

The following is a list of major and minor characters from the anime series Cowboy Bebop, directed by Shinichiro Watanabe and written by Keiko Nobumoto, its manga series adaptation, written by Kuga Cain and Yutaka Nanten, and its live-action adaptation, developed by André Nemec and written by Christopher Yost.

== Bebop crew ==
=== Spike Spiegel ===
Voiced by: Kōichi Yamadera (Japanese); Steve Blum (English)
Portrayed by: John Cho

Spike Spiegel (スパイク・スピーゲル, Supaiku Supīgeru) is a tall, lean, and slightly muscular 27-year-old bounty hunter born on Mars. Spike has a history of violent activity, seen through flashbacks and dialogue with the Red Dragon Syndicate. He is often depicted with a cavalier attitude, but occasionally shows signs of compassion when dealing with strangers.

The inspiration for Spike's martial arts is found in Bruce Lee, who uses the style of Jeet Kune Do as depicted in Session 8, "Waltz for Venus". He has fluffy, blackish green hair (inspired by Yūsaku Matsuda's role as Shunsaku Kudō in Tantei Monogatari) and reddish brown eyes, one of which is artificial and lighter than the other. He is usually dressed in a blue lounge suit, black skinny tie, with a yellow shirt and Lupin III-inspired boots.

A flashback in Session 6 revealed that his apparently fully functioning right eye was surgically replaced by a cybernetic one (although Spike himself may not have conscious recollection of the procedure since he claims to have lost his natural eye in an "accident"). A recurring device throughout the entire show is a closeup on Spike's fully natural left eye before dissolving to a flashback of his life as part of the syndicate. As said by Spike himself in the last episode, his right eye "only sees the present" and his left eye "only sees the past". The purpose of this cybernetic eye is never explicitly stated, though it apparently gives him exceptional hand–eye coordination – particularly with firearms (Spike's gun of choice is a Jericho 941, as seen throughout the series). He is also a talented pilot in his personal fighter, the Swordfish II, a modified racer.

In the final episode, Spike kills Vicious and collapses afterward, but his fate after the battle has never been officially confirmed. Spike does go from seeing his beloved and recently departed Julia with his left eye, the eye that sees his past to seeing her with his right eye, the eye that sees his present. In a May 2013 interview, director Shinichiro Watanabe stated "I want the audience to interpret it however they want to. I want them to interpret it themselves. Just because I put something there does not mean they have to believe it. If I say something in an interview that tends to make it official so I try to avoid a definite answer. In the past, people watching my shows have come up with better ideas than my original intention for the story. So I think it's good to let people use their imaginations."

=== Faye Valentine ===
Voiced by: Megumi Hayashibara (Japanese); Wendee Lee (English)
Portrayed by: Daniella Pineda

Faye Valentine (フェイ・ヴァレンタイン, Fei Varentain) is one of the members of the bounty hunting crew. She is often seen with a cigarette and in a revealing outfit complete with bright yellow hot pants and a matching, revealing top (and, on occasion, a bikini). She sports violet hair and green eyes. Although appearing to be no more than 22–23 years old, Faye is actually around 77 years old, having been put into cryogenic freeze after a space shuttle accident, wherein she spent fifty-four years in suspended animation. During the course of the series (set in 2071), Faye crosses paths with Spike and Jet twice and makes herself at home aboard their ship the second time around, much to the consternation and disapproval of the two men, both of whom have their own reservations about women in general.

Seemingly little more than a thorn in her partners' sides, Faye is actually a well-rounded member of the team. She can handle herself exceptionally well in spite of her slight appearance, displaying at least once in the series (in "Cowboy Funk") that she has a powerful punch. Adept at flying, Faye has stood her ground just as well as Spike has in an aerial dogfight in her ship Red Tail, and at times even against Spike in an aerial dogfight (though Spike eventually proved the better pilot). She also excels with guns, and is first seen in the series completely destroying a shop with a Heckler & Koch MP5K, though she is immediately apprehended afterward. In the movie, she is seen with the same gun, in addition to her normal companion: a Glock 30. Faye has an almost unstoppable attitude, and even her sometimes innocent smile can be seen as dangerous. She has many bad habits, such as drinking, habitual gambling, smoking cigarettes and occasionally cigars, becoming unnecessarily violent, and turning on partners when the profits seem too skimpy. Sarcastic and presumptuous, she rarely appears weak or in need of support. She brags and takes care of herself, never trusting others, cheating and lying her way from one day to the next. She also shows herself capable of unpredictable behavior, as when she kissed Ed on the mouth to snap Ed from one of her rambling moments.

She is a woman who is skilled at getting what she wants; her indomitable exterior hides a more delicate interior. Upon awakening from her 54-year cryogenic sleep, not only was she saddled with a massive amount of debt that she had no means to pay, but she was also diagnosed with total amnesia, a stranger in a mysterious world that she was not a part of and did not understand, surrounded by people who claimed to be helping her but were only there to take advantage of her naiveté. The surname "Valentine" was merely a name given to her by the doctor who woke her; the circumstances of her accident, her previous life, and even her real name all remain a mystery, and are only gradually revealed as the series progresses. It has been hinted that she came from Singapore on Earth, and was the daughter of a very wealthy family, as the city's famous Merlion statue features prominently in scenes of her childhood, and that memories and a film from her childhood showed her living in a large mansion. Faye is supposedly her real name, as a high school classmate (by now an old disabled woman) recognises her and calls her by that name. In her debut episode, she claims to be descended from Romani people, but it later becomes apparent that that was likely a lie. Utterly betrayed by someone she thought she could trust after waking, Faye found herself burdened with even more money to pay, and the situation resulted in the hardening of her personality to an extreme degree. She even says in Session 11: "we deceive or we are deceived", and that "nothing good ever happened to me when I trusted others".

By the end of the series she learns to value her comrades, coming back to the Bebop when she realizes that it is the only home that she has left, naming it as the "only place I could return to". She grows to understand the disadvantages of being a loner, and that even though her "family" is somewhat dysfunctional it is still a place where she will always belong.

Throughout the series, though she grows to care for Jet and even Edward in her own way, it is her relationship with Spike that remains a cause for consideration by most. In Session 20, Spike teases her and asks if she will come to help him if he gets into trouble, and though she scoffs at his remark, she eventually does. Faye even points her gun at him in a threatening gesture in the last episode, as Spike is walking away to what she and Jet both realize is his possible death; after he leaves, Faye cries. When asked, Watanabe stated in an interview: "Sometimes I'm asked the question, 'What does Spike think of Faye?' I think that actually he likes her quite a bit. But he's not a very straightforward person so he makes sure he doesn't show it."

=== Jet Black ===
Voiced by: Unshō Ishizuka (Japanese); Beau Billingslea (English)
Portrayed by: Mustafa Shakir

Known on his home satellite as the "Black Dog" for his tenacity, Jet Black (ジェット・ブラック, Jetto Burakku) is a 36-year-old former cop from Ganymede (a Jovian satellite) and acts as Spike's foil during the series. Physically, Jet is very tall with a muscular build. He wears a beard with no mustache, and is completely bald save for the back of his head. Spike acts lazy and uninterested, whereas Jet is hard working and a jack-of-all-trades. Jet was once an investigator in the Intra Solar System Police (ISSP) for many years until he lost his arm in an investigation that went awry when his corrupt partner betrayed him. His arm was replaced with a cybernetic limb—an operation later revealed to be by choice as biological replacements were possible. He wanted the fake arm as a reminder of the consequences of his actions. His loss of one of his limbs coupled with the general corruption of the police force prompted Jet to quit the ISSP in disgust and become a freelance bounty hunter. Jet also considers himself something of a renaissance man: he cultivates bonsai trees, cooks, enjoys jazz/blues music (he named his ship the Bebop, referring to a type of jazz), especially Charlie Parker, and even has interest in Goethe. As a character, Jet is the quintessential "dad" even though he often wishes people would view him as a more brotherly figure (so as not to seem old). Of the crew he shows the most obvious affection when dealing with Edward, most obviously shown when he tells her a story in Session 18; he is also shown attempting to (perhaps falsely) reassure himself after she and Faye leave the crew of the Bebop.

Jet is skilled with handguns, typically carrying a pre-2004 Walther P99, and also uses the netgun. He is proficient in hand-to-hand combat as well. Compared to Spike, Jet tends to use more raw muscle than technique. He is also a skilled mechanic and pilot. Aside from the converted interplanetary fishing trawler vessel Bebop, Jet flies a smaller ship called Hammerhead. The Hammerhead appears to be a modified salvage-craft, to which Jet has added larger engines and fuel tanks. It features a mechanical arm equipped with a harpoon as its main weapon, which is somewhat analogous to Jet's own mechanical arm. Both the Hammerhead and the Bebop are able to land on water, and have a fishing theme. It is later revealed that the Bebop was originally a fishing ship that Jet "customized" with larger engines. He is very protective of the Bebop, often being reluctant to bring it into situations where it could be damaged, and taking great offense when someone insults it.

Jet once lived with a woman named Alisa, who left him, claiming that he was overprotective towards her. They meet when the Bebop stops on Ganymede, Jet's homeworld and Jet goes to find her. He talks to her and then leaves, but later he finds out that Alisa's new boyfriend, Rhint, is wanted for murder. Jet detains Rhint and later hands him over to police.

=== Ed ===
Voiced by: Aoi Tada (Japanese); Melissa Fahn (English)
Portrayed by: Eden Perkins

Edward Wong Hau Pepelu Tivrusky IV (エドワード・ウォン・ハウ・ペペル・チブルスキー4世, Edowādo Won Hau Peperu Chiburusukī Yonsei) is an elite hacker prodigy from Earth. "Radical Edward" is a very strange and extremely intelligent teenage girl of around thirteen years of age. "Radical Ed" could be considered a "free spirit"; she is fond of silly exclamations and childish rhymes, is easily distracted, has the habit of "drifting off" from reality sometimes in mid-sentence. Ed's generally carefree attitude and energy act as a counterpoint to the more solemn and dark aspects of the show and is the anime's primary source of comic relief. Ed remains a part of the Bebop crew until the twenty-fourth episode, when she, along with Ein, leaves the crew.

In the English dub, she almost always refers to herself in the third person. Not much is known about her origins, only that she spent some of her earlier childhood in a Catholic orphanage after being left there by her father, who appears in episode twenty-four. Her father, Appeldelhi Siniz Hesap Lutfen, recognizes her immediately by her birth name of "Françoise Lütfen" and while initially unsure of her sex, leaves shortly after to continue his unending quest to document every asteroid that falls to Earth from the wreckage of the Moon. In the manga, she was a friend of a timid young boy in the orphanage known simply as "Tomato" (the name given to her PC in the anime), who, like Ed, knew a great deal about computers and the net. Ed's primary use to the Bebop crew is as a hacker; she is widely known to be a whiz kid behind the computer. Ed's computer of choice is a carry-along desktop, and when traveling by foot she will balance it on her head. Her goggles can interact with it to give her a virtual reality environment in which she can browse an entire network at once.

Originally, Ed's character was inspired by the "inner behavior" of the shows' music composer, Yoko Kanno ("a little weird, catlike, but a genius at creating music"), and was first developed as a dark-skinned boy. It was changed to even the gender ratio on the Bebop, which was, with Ed as a boy, three males and one female. The original character design appears in session 5 as a young boy that steals an adult magazine from Annie's bookstore by smuggling it under his shirt which eventually he takes out and reads. Regarding Ed, Watanabe mentioned in a 2017 interview with IGN that the character's "gender is meaningless." As for the reason why Ed's gender was ambiguous, he said wanted to create a character that surpasses humanity, going so far as to say that Ed might not even be human. It was also during this interview that Watanabe referred to Ed as both "it" and "he."

=== Ein ===
Voiced by: Kōichi Yamadera

Ein (アイン, Ain) is a Pembroke Welsh Corgi brought aboard the Bebop by Spike after a failed attempt to capture a bounty. He often shows heightened awareness of events going on around him. Over the course of the series, Ein answers the telephone, steers a car, uses the SSW, plays shogi, operates the "Brain Dream" gaming device (to hack a supercomputer in a few seconds), and generally performs tasks that an average canine would not be able to accomplish.

While the televised series only briefly hints that Ein's brain was somehow enhanced, the manga shows Ed accessing data stored in Ein's brain via a virtual reality-type interface with which she has a conversation with a human proprietor. Ein is able to "speak" to other species, as demonstrated in Session 17: "Mushroom Samba" (he speaks to a cow with a subtitled bark of "Thanks", to which the cow has a subtitled moo back of "Oh, it's no problem"). Ein initially takes a shine to Jet, but when Ed joins the crew he comes around to her as well. He follows Ed when she leaves the crew.

== Red Dragon Crime Syndicate ==
An East Asian triad organization led by a group called The Van. The Van are usually seen wearing imperial Manchurian-Chinese clothing of the Qing dynasty. The syndicate specializes in assassinations, but are also involved in the trafficking of narcotics, Red Eye in particular. The rules of the syndicate states that members who attempt to leave, or fail to complete tasks, are punished by death. Mao Yenrai served as a captain or Capo to the Elders and was a mentor to both Vicious and Spike.

After leaving the Syndicate, Spike considers himself in Mao's "debt", and is motivated to confront Vicious for the first time when Mao is killed by two men in Vicious' employ. It takes place immediately after Mao signs a peace treaty with a rival crime syndicate, the White Tiger, expressing a desire for relief from the hypervigilance of gang warfare. The Van later refers to Mao's death as "bad luck" and decline to pursue the issue when confronting Vicious. The Van is also shown to be indulgent toward Vicious initially, which eventually creates their demise. Vicious kills the Van and becomes the head of the Syndicate.

=== Vicious ===
Voiced by: Norio Wakamoto (Japanese); Skip Stellrecht (English)
Portrayed by: Alex Hassell

"Vicious" (ビシャス, Bishasu) is the main antagonist of the series, and Spike Spiegel's archenemy. He is a ruthless, cunning, power-hungry, and cold-hearted member of the Red Dragon Crime Syndicate in Tharsis, and is often referred to or depicted as a venomous snake (as opposed to Spike who is referred to as a swimming bird and the Syndicate Elders who see themselves as a dragon). His weapon of choice is a katana which he wields skillfully, even against gun-wielders. He was an infantry rifleman during the Titan War and is shown firing a semi-automatic pistol in a Session 5 flashback, as well as in the Session 26 flashback of him and Spike fighting back-to-back. Vicious is usually seen accompanied by a black cormorant-like bird. He eventually hides explosives in its stomach and detonates them as a distraction during an escape.

Vicious was Spike's partner in the Red Dragon crime syndicate until they fell into conflict over Julia. After Spike's supposed death, Vicious left the Red Dragons briefly to fight in the Titan War of 2068. Although his precise motivations for enlisting are debated, his testimony helped frame Gren, his squadmate in the war, for spying, which raises the possibility that he himself might have been involved in military espionage on behalf of the Syndicate and chose to pin it on his admirer. However, in the Titan flashbacks he is also seen to be remembering Julia.

Vicious believes that he is the only one who can kill, or "awaken" Spike, as Spike is the only one who can do the same for Vicious. Vicious's real age is revealed in the official guidebook The After: at 27, he is the same age as Spike. The age 27 is significant in the series because of the connotations it has to some legendary musicians passing away at that age, who are called the 27 Club. He appears much older due to his gray hair and the heavy, ever-present bags under his eyes.

=== Julia ===
Voiced by: Gara Takashima (Japanese); Mary Elizabeth McGlynn (English)
Portrayed by: Elena Satine

Julia (ジュリア, Juria) is a beautiful and mysterious woman from Spike's past. Initially Vicious' girlfriend and a Syndicate member herself, she and Spike started an affair that led to Spike offering to abandon the Syndicate and elope with her, despite the fact that the Syndicate punishes desertion with death. Arranging to meet at a graveyard, Spike goes to confront the Syndicate with his resignation, resulting in a violent gun battle where he is presumed to have died. Vicious discovers the affair, however, and confronts Julia, telling her that she would have to kill Spike at the graveyard, or else they would both be killed. To protect not only herself but also the man she loved, Julia goes into hiding, never meeting Spike as both of them had planned; Spike is never aware of Vicious' threats until the very end of the series. Despite being among the main driving points for the series, Julia only appears in flashbacks until the final two episodes.

After meeting Faye Valentine by coincidence, Julia is reunited with Spike. However, their reunion coincides with Vicious' first attempt to stage a coup on the Red Dragon Syndicate. When he fails and is imprisoned, the Syndicate's Old Guard launches a campaign to find and kill anyone who was or had ever been loyal to Vicious' group. This includes Spike, Julia and their friend Annie, who distributes munitions under cover of a convenience store. The store is ambushed by the Syndicate while Spike and Julia are there, and Julia is shot and killed as she and Spike try to escape across the rooftops. Her last words to Spike are "It's all a dream...".

=== Lin ===
Voiced by: Hikaru Midorikawa (Japanese); Derek Stephen Prince (English)
Portrayed by: Hoa Xuande

Lin (リン, Rin) is a young and loyal member of the Red Dragon Crime Syndicate who is asked by Wang Long to accompany Vicious on a drug deal to the moon Callisto. When Spike Spiegel confronts Vicious in a back alleyway at night, Lin steps in and shoots Spike with a tranquilizer bullet. Lin used to work under Spike, but since Spike left the Red Dragons, he works under Vicious. Lin accompanies Vicious to the Red Eye deal atop a roof, where they encounter Gren. When fighting between the two starts, Lin throws himself in front of a bullet meant for Vicious. Lin dies, but is mentioned in "The Real Folk Blues Part I" when his brother, Shin, shows up.

=== Shin ===
Voiced by: Nobuyuki Hiyama (Japanese); Kirk Baily (English)
Portrayed by: Ann Truong

Shin (シン, Shin) is the younger brother of Lin. He appears in "The Real Folk Blues Part I" to rescue Spike and Jet from Syndicate assassins, which leads to him revealing Vicious's coup against the Red Dragon leaders. He reappears in "The Real Folk Blues, Part II" during Spike's attack on the Red Dragon headquarters, aiding him in the running gunfight against the Syndicate minions. Shin is killed shortly before Spike reaches Vicious. With his last words he asks Spike to kill Vicious and tells him that he had been hoping for him to return.

=== Annie ===
Voiced by: Miyuki Ichijo (Japanese); Carol Stanzione (English)

Annie (アニー, Anī) is the owner of a convenience store on Mars, and an old friend of Spike, Julia and Mao Yenrai. Her name is short for "Anastasia". First introduced in "Ballad of Fallen Angels", Annie informs Spike of Mao's assassination by Vicious. She carries a variety of small arms and supplies Spike with a Beretta pistol and a large carton of ammunition. She also chides Spike for seeking to avenge his mentor by picking a fight with Vicious. Annie is fatally wounded prior to Spike and Julia's arrival in "The Real Folk Blues, Part II".

== Recurring characters ==
=== Gren Eckener ===
Voiced by: Kenyu Horiuchi (Japanese); David A. Thomas (English)
Portrayed by: Mason Alexander Park

Grencia Mars Elijah Guo Eckener (グレンシア・マルス・エリヤ・郭・エッケナー, Gurenshia Marusu Eriya Guo Ekkenā), also simply referred to as Gren (グ レ ン, Guren), was a soldier for the war on Titan, and appears in the two-part episode "Jupiter Jazz". On Titan he fought beside Vicious, whom he admired and found encouragement in. After the war, Gren came back hoping to be a jazz musician, but he was arrested as a spy. In prison, Gren heard that Vicious testified against him; this and the isolation drove him mad. The prison conducted drug experiments on him. In some translations, he suffered from insomnia while in prison and started using drugs to deal with it. In either case, the drugs severely imbalanced his hormones, causing him to develop a feminine figure, including breasts. After escaping from jail, Gren worked as a saxophone player at Rester House, a bar in a sector called "The Blue Crow", which is located on one of Jupiter's moons, Callisto. He met Julia there and found out from her how Vicious betrayed him.

Two years later, Gren rescues Faye from a street fight and takes her to his apartment. While Faye is there, Vicious calls, raising suspicions about Gren. Intruding on him while showering, Faye discovers Gren's secret. Gren explains his background, and tells her that he is going to see if Vicious really framed him. Disguising himself as a woman, Gren meets Vicious and Lin. Exchanging Red Eye for Titan Opal, Gren suspects a trap. He shoots it open, setting off the explosive, and then reveals who he is. In the ensuing battle, Lin dies to protect Vicious. Spike arrives and attacks Vicious. Gren had planted an explosive in the bag of Red Eye, which damages Vicious' ship. In the 4-way dogfight with Vicious and Spike, Gren's ship is severely damaged, forcing him to land. Spike lands next to Gren's ship to find Gren lying in the snow, badly wounded. Gren guesses who Spike is by his eyes; "Julia was always talking about you; your eyes are different colors. I remember her saying that". Gren requests that Spike help him back into his ship and tow it out into space, allowing him to die on a final voyage to Titan.

=== Punch and Judy ===
Punch – Voiced by: Tsutomu Tareki (Japanese); Paul St. Peter (English)
Judy – Voiced by: Miki Nagasawa (Japanese); Lia Sargent (English)
Portrayed by: Ira Munn (Punch); Lucy Carrey (Judy)

Punch (パンチ, Panchi) and Judy (ジュディ, Judi) are the hosts of the TV show Big Shot. They are named after the traditional English puppet show. The show provides information on various bounty heads, but is often unreliable. The Bebop crew often has the show playing in the background, but seldom pays close attention (they usually get their information from close contacts). Punch and Judy play the "cowboy" persona in a characteristic, over the top fashion. Punch adopts a mid-western drawl mixed with a Mexican accent (both faked), and uses random old-West sayings. Judy plays the stereotypical dumb blonde, and always appears in an open bolero jacket with nothing underneath, frequently wiggling her hips with excitement. Big Shot is canceled towards the end of the series. Punch, lacking accent and costume, makes a cameo revealing his and Judy's fates: Punch, whose real name is Alfredo, moves to Mars to take care of his mother, and Judy is engaged to her agent, Cameron Wilson.

Punch and Judy's appearances had no specific model; the characters had the style of typical television hosts.

=== Antônio, Carlos and Jobim ===
Antônio – Voiced by: Hitoshi Hirao (Japanese); Kevin Seymour (English)
Carlos – Voiced by: Toshihiko Nakajima (Japanese); Steve Kramer (English)
Jobim – Voiced by: Hiroshi Naka (Japanese); Kevin Seymour (English)

Throughout the series and the movie, three rude, foul-mouthed, crotchety old men make frequent appearances, as speaking characters, or in the background during scenes. They make various claims about what they did before becoming old-timers, including bounty hunting, building the stargates, farming, piloting planes in a war, sinking the Bismarck, digging ditches, and crop-dusting. They seem on speaking terms with many supporting characters, and though they run into the main characters often there is not much attention paid to them (or even mention that the main characters have seen them before). They do the preview of the episode "Mushroom Samba". According to the movie credits, they are called Antônio (アントニオ, Antonio), Carlos (カルロス, Karurosu), and Jobim (ジョビン, Jobin). This is in reference to famed Brazilian musician Antônio Carlos Jobim. In the film, they help Jet and Faye distribute the antidote for a deadly, hallucinogenic nanovirus by flying 20th-century era antique planes over Alba City. Cowboy Bebop Anime Guide Volume 4 states that since the names of the three old men appear once, it is not certain whether the names Antônio, Carlos, and Jobim are their real names. In episode 22, Cowboy Funk, Antônio is briefly seen walking past a water fountain without Carlos and Jobim. All three make a cameo appearance in episode 11 of Blood Blockade Battlefront, another series by the same animation studio as Cowboy Bebop.

=== Laughing Bull ===
Voiced by: Takehiro Koyama (Japanese); Michael Gregory (English)

A kind old shaman, apparently of Native American descent, Laughing Bull (ラフィング・ブル, Rafingu Buru) lives on Mars. Spike goes to Laughing Bull for advice in Session 1 while looking for bounty head Asimov. He appears briefly at the beginning of "Jupiter Jazz, Part I" and at the end of "Jupiter Jazz, Part II". In "The Real Folk Blues, Part II", Jet goes to him for information on Spike's whereabouts. Laughing Bull is seen with a small child in "Jupiter Jazz" and with a young man in the movie; their identities have never been revealed. As a shaman, he dresses in classic Native American wear and lives in a teepee-like tent surrounded by relics of old, discarded technology. Laughing Bull refers to Spike as "Swimming Bird", and calls Jet "Running Rock".

=== Bob ===
Voiced by: Yutaka Nakano (Japanese); John Snyder (English)

Bob (ボブ, Bobu) is an ISSP, mustache-wearing policeman based on Ganymede to whom Jet frequently goes to for inside information when looking for bounty heads. Throughout the series, and especially in the film, Bob provides (sometimes reluctantly) crucial information.

== Other characters ==
=== Victoria "V.T." Terpsichore ===
Voiced by: Tomie Kataoka (Japanese); Melodee Spevack (English)

Victoria "V.T." Terpsichore is a tough-talking space trucker whose deceased husband, Ural Terpsichore, is a legendary bounty hunter. Always with her cat, Zeros, she appears in the episode "Heavy Metal Queen". Spike meets her in a bar while on hunt for an explosive-smuggling criminal named Decker. After having a bar brawl with several stooges, Spike and V.T. seem to become fast friends until she learns Spike is a bounty hunter. Although she regards Spike as "lowlife bounty hunter scum", she puts their differences aside and reluctantly works with him when their paths cross again as V.T. begins searching for Decker, who has performed a ship hit and run on one of her fellow truck drivers.

Her full name is largely a secret, which has prompted many to bet money and guess what her initials stand for. She is also known as the "Heavy Metal Queen", for her love of heavy metal music, which she considers "very soothing". Able to adapt to various situations, her philosophy is "When in Rome, do as the Romans do". Considering her disdain for bounty hunters, it is believed that her husband was killed while pursuing a bountyhead.

=== Rocco Bonnaro ===
Voiced by: Ryūsei Nakao (Japanese); Tom Fahn (English)

Rocco Bonnaro (ロコ・ボナーロ, Roko Bonāro) is a member of Piccaro Calvino's gang. He is involved in organized crime to support his blind younger sister, Stella Bonnaro (ステラ・ボナーロ, Sutera Bonāro). Rocco sees Spike effortlessly take out several hijackers on a spaceliner and begs Spike to teach him how to fight. He befriends Spike although he does not tell him about the bounty on his head. Rocco gives Spike a package to hold onto, which contains a plant called "Grey Ash" that he stole from Calvino. This plant, worth millions of woolongs, is capable of curing "Venus Sickness", the disease which has blinded Stella. Rocco has a rendezvous with Spike and they fight Calvino's gang. Rocco pulls off one of Spike's Jeet Kune Do maneuvers and topples one of the gangsters, but is gunned down. Later, Spike pays his respects and visits Stella in the hospital where she is receiving treatment to tell her that Rocco has died. Before he leaves, Stella asks Spike about the type of person her brother really was. Spike responds, "You know better than anyone, without looking. He was a terrific guy – exactly the person you thought he was."

=== Chessmaster Hex ===
Voiced by: Takeshi Watabe (Japanese); Michael McCarty (English)

Hex is a talented programmer widely considered to be a genius due to his long-standing hold of the Champion Seat of the CosmoNet Chess tournament series. At the age of 30 he joined the Hyperspace Gate Project and, ultimately, played a key role in the development of the central control system used in all gates. However, Hex soon began to have doubts about the functionality of the control system, believing it to have defects. Upon discovering that these defects were intentionally added by the Gate Corporation to ensure further revenue, Hex developed a plan to be executed 50 years in the future that would allow criminals to hijack the Astral Gate toll booths.

In the episode "Bohemian Rhapsody", Spike, Jet and Faye track down Hex following the failed toll booth hijackings. Hex, now old and senile, is living peacefully inside of a bohemian junk heap floating in outer space. Given that he had completely forgotten about his prearranged sting, the crew strikes a deal with the Gate Corporation to ensure his safety.

=== Andy von de Oniyate ===
Voiced by: Masashi Ebara (Japanese); Daran Norris (English)

Andy von de Oniyate is a rich, egotistical bounty hunter who completely embraces the cowboy aspect of his job; he dresses like a cowboy, rides a horse named Onyx, uses six-shooters as his primary weapons and a cowboy whip to capture his bounties. The Bebop crew insists that Spike and Andy act exactly the same as each other, to Spike's increasing consternation. Despite his bumbling behavior, he is quite resourceful and intelligent, as well as being on par with Spike in fighting ability. Andy eventually gives up the cowboy persona, choosing instead to take up a samurai persona and call himself Musashi and Onyx "Jiroumaru".

=== Mad Pierrot Tongpu ===
Voiced by: Banjō Ginga (Japanese); Kevin Seymour (English)
Portrayed by: Josh Randall

Mad Pierrot Tongpu (real name unknown) was part of an experiment to create the perfect assassin by a secret organization referred to only as Section 13. While Tongpu was made into a rotund and virtually indestructible living weapon, the procedures caused him to begin regressing mentally, ruining his capacity as a weapon. While being transported to a secure facility for observation, Tongpu escaped with the intention of exacting revenge, but eventually came to enjoy the act of killing. Spike happens to witness Tongpu killing someone, making him the target of Tongpu as well. Spike escapes when a cat distracts Tongpu and gives him time to blow up a gas canister. Spike is sent a personal invitation to Spaceland, a theme park, by Tongpu. In the ensuing fight, Spike throws a knife into Tongpu's leg, where he's then crushed underfoot by a giant robot in an animatronic parade. Tongpu's name is taken from two songs on Yellow Magic Orchestra's debut album, "Mad Pierrot" and "Tong Poo."

== Movie-only characters ==
=== Electra Ovirowa ===
Voiced by: Ai Kobayashi (Japanese); Jennifer Hale (English)

Electra Ovirowa (エレクトラ・オヴィロゥ, Erekutora Ovirō; "Electra Ovilo" on Sony's official website and in Japanese materials) is a veteran of the Titan War who first appears in Cowboy Bebop: The Movie. Her love for Vincent caused them to have a short-term relationship, during which Vincent transferred the vaccine to Electra. She is unaware of this until Vincent sets free the nanomachine on the Monorail and she survives. She meets Spike by chance when he infiltrates a bio-weapon lab fronting as a pharmaceutical company where she works. After a few more chance meetings, and witnessing his being shot and thrown from a monorail by Vincent, she teams up with the crew of the Bebop to put an end to Vincent's intent to destroy the population of Mars. The samples of her blood are used to make the vaccine that is spread over Alba City. In the end, it is she who shoots Vincent and kills him. She cries for him when he admits he remembers her and their love for one another as he is dying.

=== Vincent Volaju ===
Voiced by: Tsutomu Isobe (Japanese); Daran Norris (English)

Vincent Volaju is the main antagonist of Cowboy Bebop: The Movie, Vincent Volaju (ヴィンセント・ボラージュ, Vinsento Borāju) is the only survivor of a series of experiments conducted during the Titan War to build immunity to the lethal nanomachines that were secretly developed by the military. His plan is to release the nanomachines throughout the world, leaving only a handful of survivors. He holds the rare distinction of being one of a select few characters in Cowboy Bebop who has been able to match Spike in close combat. Watanabe said that he believes that many people would say that they empathize with Vincent and that "I even understand him". The interviewer, describing Vincent as the "most evil character in the Bebop series", asked Watanabe if Vincent was his opportunity to "show something you couldn't get away with on TV". Watanabe responded by saying that such a thing was not the case, and that Vincent is "nothing more than my dark side". Watanabe added that he does not see this as a "particularly unique feature" of Cowboy Bebop: The Movie, and that all people have moments when they "lose our temper and want to destroy everything".

=== Lee Sampson ===
Voiced by: Yūji Ueda (Japanese); Dave Wittenberg (English)

A teenage hacker and Vincent's accomplice, Lee Sampson (リー・サムソン, Rī Samuson) is very interested in video games from the 20th century (as shown by him playing an alternate version of Pac-Man in a car while talking to Vincent). He's later betrayed by Vincent and is killed with the nanoweapons Vincent was using in his plot to eliminate mankind. In an interview with Watanabe, the interviewer referred to Lee Sampson, a character in the film who "unable to distinguish" death in real life and death in a video game, responding to the death of a video game avatar and the death of a security guard in an equally-detached manner; when the interviewer asked Watanabe whether he wanted to "question society's desensitization to violence" with a character who "truly feels the pain of death", Watanabe responded by saying that he did not intend to "make it a 'statement', as such". Watanabe added that he does not create films to "particular message" and that films "naturally reflect the way we feel at the time".

=== Rashid ===
Voiced by: Mickey Curtis (Japanese); Nicholas Guest (English)

Rashid (ラシード, Rashīdo; also spelled Rasheed) appears during Cowboy Bebop: The Movie. An ethnic Arab with a considerable amount of knowledge of "beans", he is really Doctor Mendelo al-Hedia, the man who developed the nanomachine that was to be used as a virus for the military and vaccinated Vincent in attempt to keep it under control. He then apparently escaped from the medical facility and took refuge in Mars' Moroccan street, assuming a new identity. He provides Spike with a sample of the nanomachine virus in an attempt to atone for his creating it. After revealing to Spike, in a later scene, the nature of the nanomachine virus and the vaccine given to Vincent, armed men show up and Rashid runs off, followed by the sounds of gunfire. His fate is unclear, though a scene played during the credits of the movie seems to show him alive and well in Moroccan street.
