= Spike Spiegel =

Fictional character from Cowboy Bebop

- Cowboy Bebop character
- Promotional image of Spike Spiegel
- First appearance: "Stray Dog Strut" (April 1998; TV Tokyo broadcast) "Asteroid Blues" (October 1998; chronological broadcast)
- Created by: Hajime Yatate; Shinichirō Watanabe
- Designed by: Toshihiro Kawamoto
- Portrayed by: John Cho
- Voiced by: Japanese; Kōichi Yamadera; English; Steve Blum

Spike Spiegel (Japanese: スパイク・スピーゲル, Hepburn: Supaiku Supīgeru) is a fictional character and the main protagonist of the 1998 anime series Cowboy Bebop. Spike is a former member of the criminal Red Dragon Syndicate, which he left by faking his death after falling in love with a woman named Julia. He is first introduced as the partner of Jet Black, captain of the spaceship Bebop: the two are legalized bounty hunters pursuing criminals across the populated planets and moons of the Solar System. During his adventures on board the Bebop, he is drawn back into a bitter feud with Vicious, a rival from the Syndicate who seeks to kill him.

Spike was created by series director Shinichirō Watanabe and was designed by Toshihiro Kawamoto as part of the production entity Hajime Yatate. Created as a mirror image of Watanabe and based on Japanese actor Yūsaku Matsuda's portrayal of Shunsaku Kudō in Tantei Monogatari (Detective Story), he was designed as someone who would expect others to follow his lead. Kawamoto deliberately designed him to appear "uncool" to create the opposite effect for viewers. His final confrontation with Vicious was planned well in advance. His portrayal in the later movie adaptation displayed the character's softer side and inner thoughts. Spike is voiced in Japanese by Kōichi Yamadera. In the English dub, he is voiced by Steven Blum.

In addition to the series, Spike has been featured in two manga adaptations and has been the protagonist of two video game adaptations. His character was subject to much critical acclaim in Japan and the West, with multiple reviewers praising his portrayal. He has appeared on multiple reader and critic lists of the best anime characters. In addition to the series, many reviewers of the movie positively noted his expanded portrayal in Cowboy Bebop: The Movie. Both actors have been praised for their performances, with Blum commenting that it boosted his voice acting career.

== Characteristics ==
Spike is a bounty hunter who was born on Mars on June 26, 2044. He is 27 years old. Spike has fluffy hair and brown eyes, the left being artificial. He is 6'1" tall and weighs 155 lbs. Spike is a heavy smoker, and is frequently seen smoking regardless of poor weather and the presence of "no smoking" signs. A skilled martial artist who practices Jeet Kune Do, Spike is a devout follower of the philosophies of Bruce Lee. He also owns a converted asteroid racer called the Swordfish II. During gunfights, he often uses a Jericho 941. The guns on the show were chosen by the director, Watanabe, and in discussion with set designer, Isamu Imakake, and mechanical designer, Kimitoshi Yamane. Setting producer, Satoshi Toba said, "They talked about how they did not want common guns, because that would not be very interesting, and so they decided on these guns."

In Spike's younger days before joining the Bebop, he was part of the Red Dragon Syndicate, a Chinese criminal organization. During his time there, he was impetuous and volatile, but after leaving, he adopted a calm and collected demeanor. However, he still retains his love for combat. Spike always holds true to his own values and fulfills his obligations. He also generally goes his own way rather than following orders, which often gets him into trouble. Watanabe thought of Spike as a Yakuza. He also said that Spike has a habit of being very indirect with his emotions; for example, he may behave antagonistically towards someone he actually likes. Watanabe said that Spike's relationship with Faye Valentine is a prime example of this tendency.

In the third volume of the manga, Cowboy Bebop illustrated by Yutaka Nanten and story by Hajime Yatate, Spike is described as "oriental," a term for Asian.

At Otakon 1999, Watanabe stated at the anime panel that the name Spike Spiegel was chosen because he liked the sound only, not because of Jewish origins. Kawamoto based Spike's hairstyle and appearance on the Japanese actor, Yusaku Matsuda. The concept of Spike was created before the idea of the anime and months before Kawamoto was hired and had input from Watanabe on designing the character.

== Appearances ==
=== In Cowboy Bebop ===
Years before the beginning of the series, Spike is a rising member of the Red Dragon crime syndicate. While there, he becomes a partner and friend of Vicious, another member of the Syndicate. After being wounded in a gun battle, Spike is nursed back to health by Vicious' girlfriend Julia, and the two fall in love. They plan to elope and escape the Syndicate, but Vicious finds out and presents Julia with an ultimatum: kill Spike or be executed. After Spike fakes his death to escape the Syndicate, Julia never arrives to rendezvous with him—instead she goes into hiding to avoid betraying him or being killed herself. Spike eventually met and teamed up with former Inter-Solar System Police (ISSP) officer Jet Black. As legal bounty hunters, they travel the Solar System's inhabited worlds hunting bountyheads.

During his time on the Bebop, he and Jet are joined by Ein, an intelligent Pembroke Welsh Corgi; Faye Valentine, a gambler and original resident of Earth woken from cryogenic sleep; and Edward "Ed" Wong Hau Pepelu Tivruski IV, an eccentric girl from Earth who is a master hacker. Spike also has run-ins with Vicious on two occasions: in "Ballad of Fallen Angels", while pursuing a Red Dragon executive, Spike and Vicious battle in a derelict church and Spike is nearly killed. Later, in "Jupiter Jazz", Spike hears that Julia was seen on Callisto and abandons the Bebop to look for her. Once there, he stumbles into a drug deal orchestrated by Gren, a man Vicious betrayed who is seeking revenge. During their confrontation, a three-way battle ensues: Vicious escapes, and Gren is fatally injured, but he succeeds in telling Spike that Julia is alive and in hiding.

During the final story of the series, "The Real Folk Blues", Julia comes out of hiding and sends a message to Spike through Faye: the two meet and resolve to flee as originally planned. Vicious, having staged a coup d'état and taken over the Red Dragon Syndicate, sends assassins after the two. During a battle, Julia is shot and killed. After saying his goodbyes to Jet and Faye, Spike storms the headquarters of the Syndicate and has a final confrontation with Vicious: Spike is severely wounded and Vicious is killed. Spike looks up to the sky and sees Julia. Some time after this, Spike walks into and collapses in the entrance hall. He is never shown moving again. A star is shown going out. Spike's ultimate fate has never been confirmed, with Watanabe eventually claiming he was unable to say whether he lived or died.

=== In other media ===
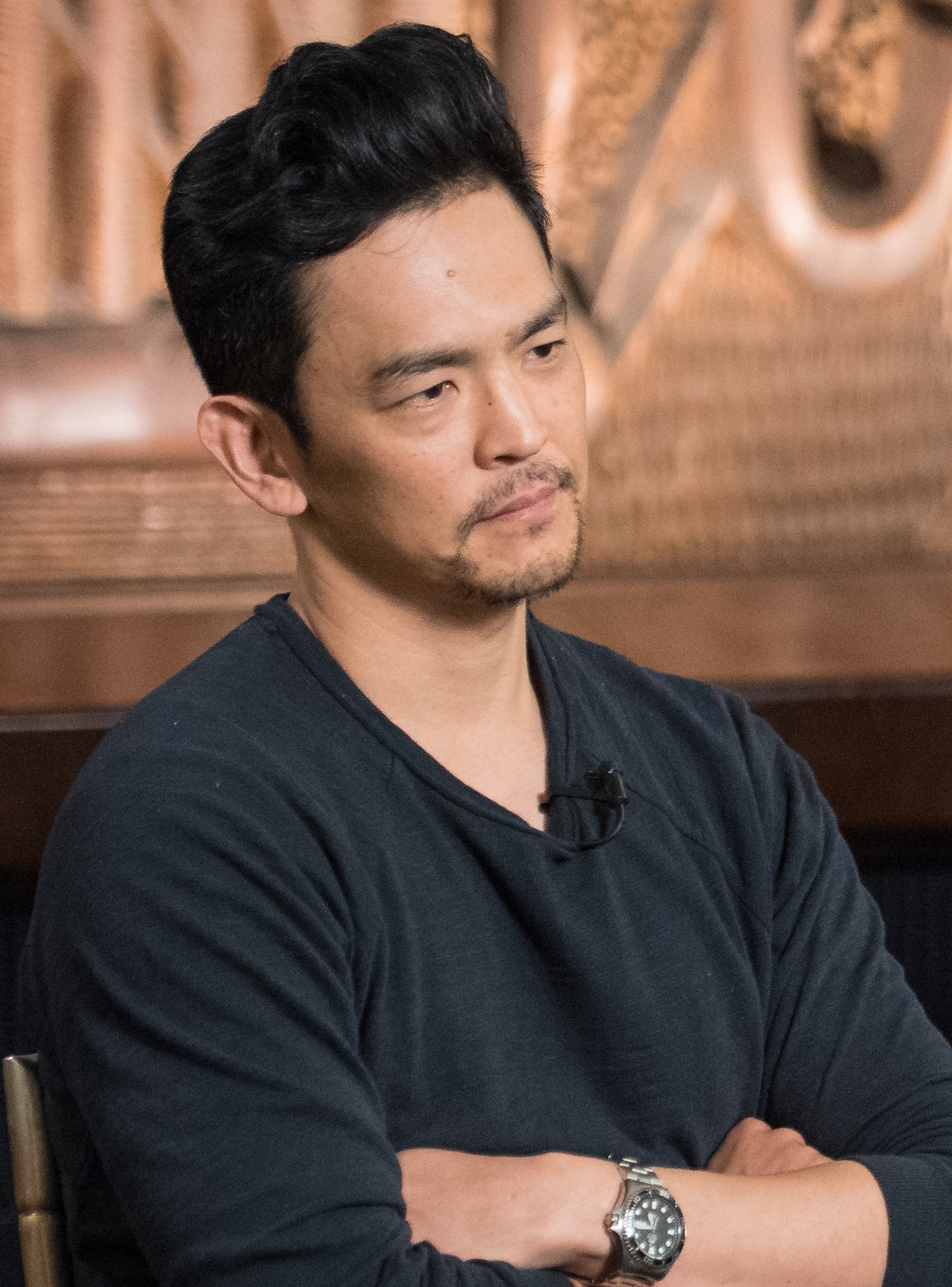
John Cho portrayed Spike in the live-action series based on the anime

Spike is the main protagonist of Cowboy Bebop: The Movie, a story set between Episodes 22 and 23 of the original series while the Bebop crew are still working together. The crew of the Bebop take on a massive bounty for Vincent Volaju, who releases a cloud of deadly protein-based nanomachines in Mars' capital city. During his pursuit, Spike initially fights then allies with Electra Ovirowa, a former comrade of Vincent's.

Spike appears along with the other main characters in the manga adaptation of Cowboy Bebop and the alternate manga Cowboy Bebop: Shooting Star. In the PlayStation Cowboy Bebop, players control Spike as he pilots the Swordfish II during aerial battles through pre-set courses. Spike appears as one of the playable characters in the PlayStation 2 action/beat 'em up video game Cowboy Bebop: Tsuioku no Serenade, a game set within the continuity of the series.

John Cho portrayed Spike in the live-action series for Netflix released in 2021. For the role, Cho grew out his hair to mimic Spike's look from the anime.

== Creation and conception ==
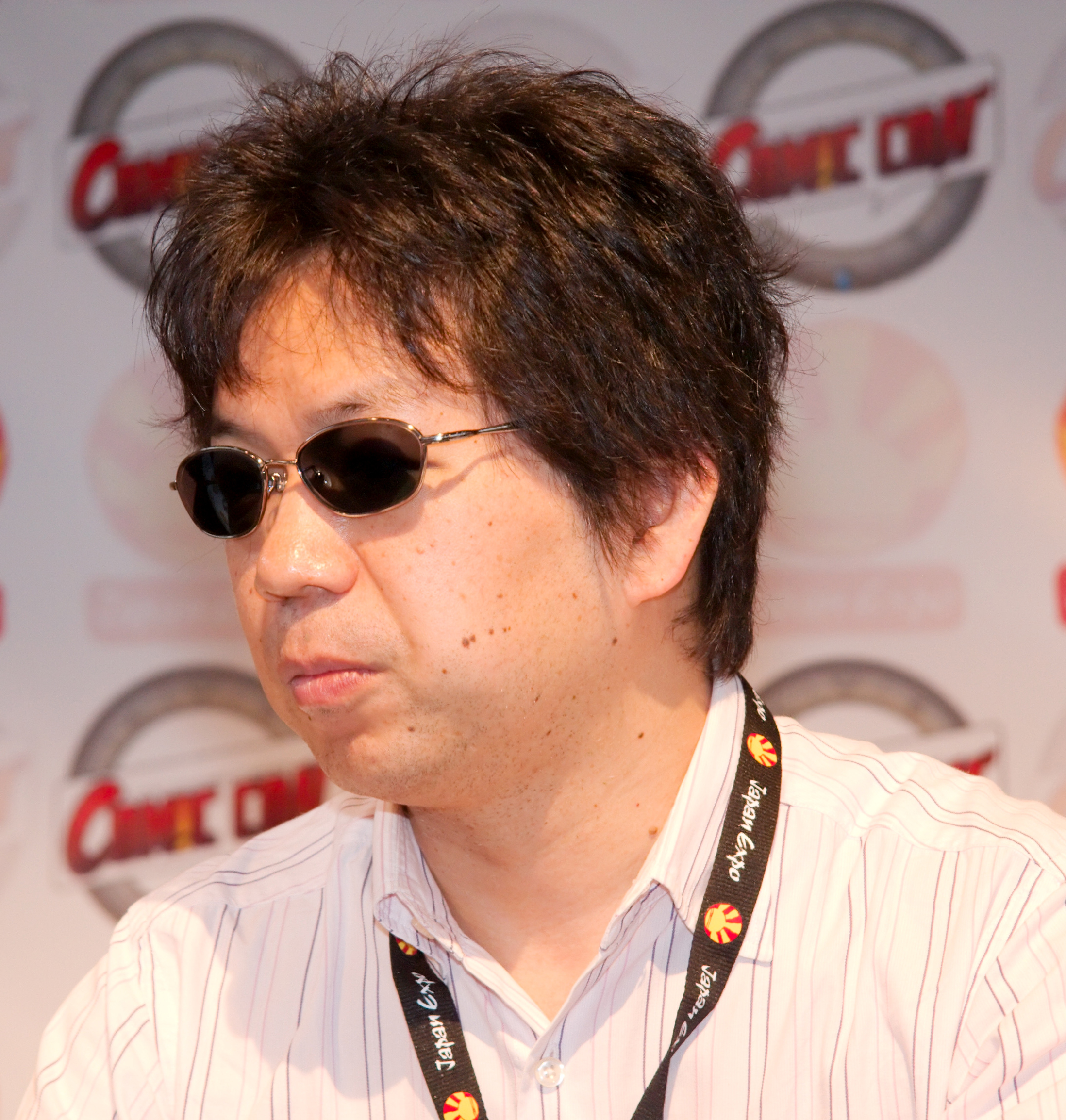
Shinichirō Watanabe created Spike's character.

During the first work by Shinichirō Watanabe on Cowboy Bebop, the first image that came to him was of Spike. Prior to that, Watanabe had the character of Spike in mind for a long time beforehand. From that point on, Watanabe "tried to build a story around him, trying to make him cool." Watanabe created Spike as a mirror image of himself: in Watanabe's words, "I don't smoke or drink or fight, but I want to – so Spike does." Spike forms the main focus on the series, with the central theme being his past and its karmic effect on him. Spike was portrayed as a "typical old-style Japanese man", who would simply do what he wanted and expect others to follow his lead and watch him from the sidelines. Spike's artificial eye was included as Watanabe wanted his characters to have flaws. He was originally going to give Spike an eye patch, but the producers vetoed it. In order to portray him as cool, Toshihiro Kawamoto designed Spike to look "uncool": when he stands still, he has a hunched appearance. This meant that when the character was moving vigorously, he came across as "extra cool". Spike's appearance was primarily based on the main protagonist of Tantei Monogatari, portrayed by famous Japanese actor Yūsaku Matsuda. Although Yamadera was a fan of Matsuda's, he avoided imitating his distinctive manner of speaking, noting that it "wouldn't have sounded right" for Spike. Spike's Swordfish II spaceship was created by mecha designer Kimitoshi Yamane. Yamane liked the English biplane torpedo-bomber Fairey Swordfish, which led him to name the Swordfish II after the bomber. The conclusion of Spike's story and his final battle with Vicious were planned by Watanabe well in advance, with each episode featuring them meant to shadow their final confrontation. Some of the staff were unhappy about this approach as a continuation of the series would be difficult. While he considered altering the ending, he eventually settled with his original idea.

With regards to casting, Watanabe considered Kōichi Yamadera to be "really perfect" for Spike. The staff had him audition as a formality, but Watanabe felt that "no matter how you looked at it, there was only Yamadera". After a decade of work in anime series, Yamadera was pleased to secure his first leading role, but Unshō Ishizuka, Jet's voice actor, was surprised that Yamadera was not cast as Jet. The two characters were designed to be opposites, with Spike being thin and wearing smart attire, while Jet was bulky and wore more casual clothing. Spike's English voice actor, Steven Blum, used film noir imagery to get himself in the right frame of mind to voice the character, but experienced some difficulty portraying in scenes where he was showing vulnerability. Reflecting on his performance, Blum said "there were a few lines here and there that I felt were awkward, and could have been smoothed out better." He called Spike an "example of a character [he] didn't fully appreciate until the series was over", adding that he would like to reprise his role as the character if given the chance. Spike's portrayal was expanded in Cowboy Bebop: The Movie. Specifically, according to Yamadera, the character displayed more of his inner thoughts and showed a gentler side than he did in the series. This was because the team had more time available to express such details. Blum found his performance in the movie one of his most difficult from an emotional standpoint, as there were scenes where Spike was portrayed quite differently from the version he had been playing in the series.

== Reception and legacy ==
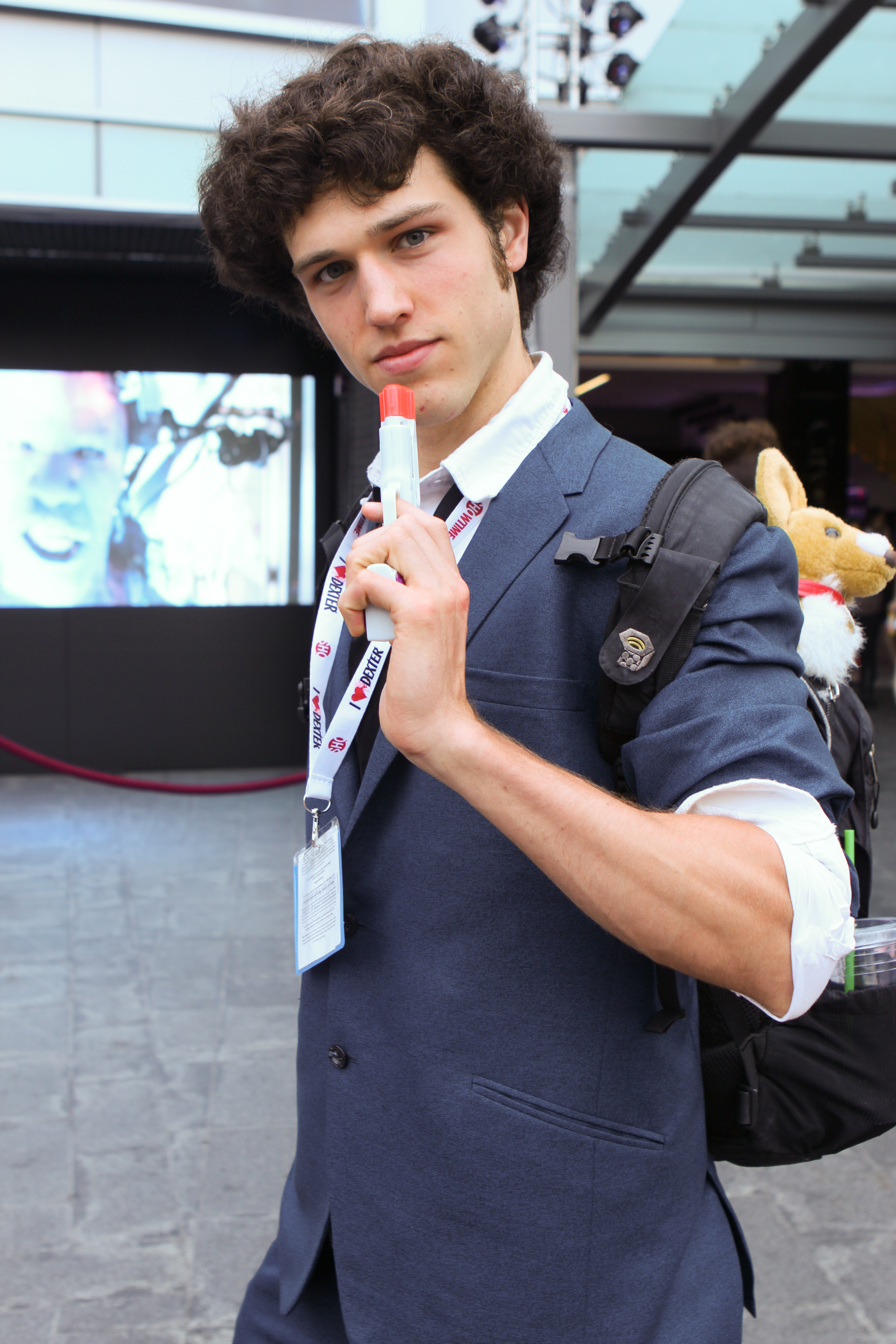
A fan cosplaying as Spike

Spike's character has been met with widespread acclaim. In Japan, he won first place in the Best Male Character category at Animage's annual Anime Grand Prix awards two consecutive times in 1998 and 1999. In the August 2001 issue of the Japanese magazine Newtype, Spike was ranked first on the magazine's list of "Top 10 Most Popular Male Anime Characters in Japan". The next year in July 2002, Spike was again placed at number one on Newtype's anime list of "Favorite Male Character". In a Newtype poll from March 2010, Spike was voted by readers as the eighteenth most popular male anime character from the 1990s. In 2014, Kōichi Yamadera was voted by fans as the third coolest "old guy" voice actor in a Goo Ranking poll, and three years later, topped Asahi's list of the 25 best voice actors as voted by their peers, with his portrayal of Spike cited as one of the contributing factors.

Western critics have also directed significant praise towards Spike. In his review of Cowboy Bebop, Anime News Network's Mike Crandol praised the character portrayals, especially Spike's, stating that "Spike's character in particular runs the gamut from goofy to blasé to teeth-gnashing tough; he is one of most three-dimensional anime leads in recent memory." Christi of THEM Anime Review 4.0 complimented Spike's story arc in the series, saying that "the underlying theme of Spike Spiegel and his motivations for what he does is absolutely intriguing." DVDTalk's Kyle Mills called Spike the epitome of a good lead protagonist, referring to him as "composed, always cool, and is essentially the ultimate badass", although his true nature is gradually shown throughout the series. In an article in The Atlantic, writer Alex Suskind was positive about Spike's portrayal and development, saying that the word "cool" was the most apt way of describing him and referring to him as "a space-age samurai-cum-Marlboro Man". Richard Eisenbeis of Kotaku, writing a retrospective on the series, praised the relationship between Spike and Faye, especially the way it evolved through the series without overt verbal expressions of affection.

His portrayal in The Movie has also received praise: IGN's Andy Patrizio said that Spike "opens up his soul a little" during the film, while Chris Beveridge of Mania.com found Spike more likable in the film than in some parts of the series, comparing him to Lupin III and praising the moments where he could be himself and show more of his inner self. Carlos Ross of THEM Anime Review said that Spike's portrayal was one of the things that worked in the film, and DVD Talk's Neil Lumbard, alongside general praise of the characters, positively noted the further exploration of his personality. Anime News Network's Mike Crandol was less enthusiastic, saying that while Spike was the only one who got much attention during the film, some sequences felt like they could work without him.

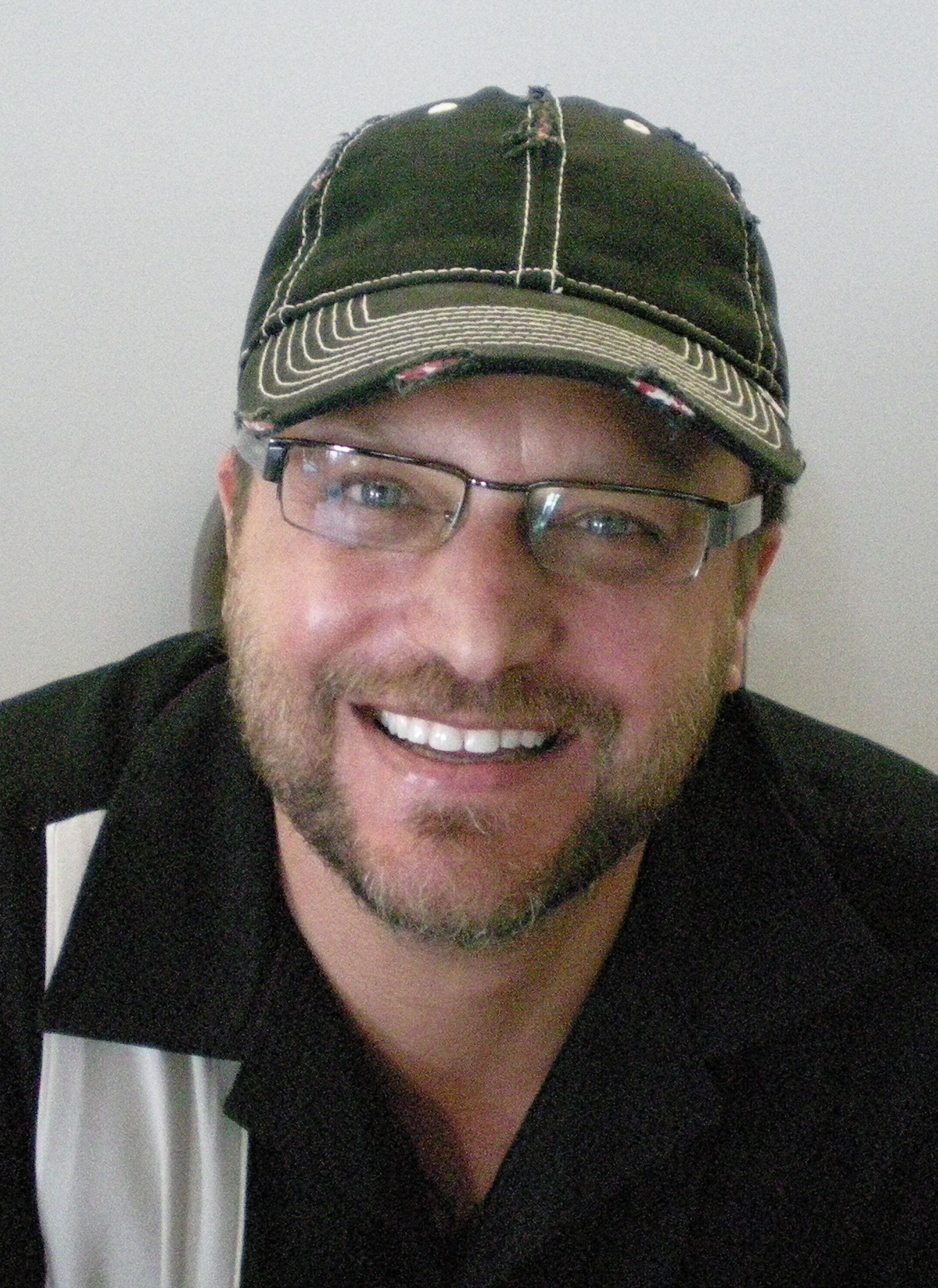
Steven Blum, who voices the character in the English dub, has received praise for his performance.

The Japanese and English portrayals of Spike have also drawn praise individually. While praising the Japanese cast as "perfectly complementing the characters", Kenneth Lee of EX.org argued that "there could be no one else to fill the role of Spike Spiegel except Yamadera". Meanwhile, IGN's Ramsey Isler stated that "Steve Blum launched his career into new heights when he gave the performance of a lifetime in the English dub of the series, giving Spike a sense of smooth, effortless cool that many argue surpassed the original Japanese version." Commending the principal American cast's work as one of the best English dubs, Serdar Yegulalp of About.com highlighted Blum as Spike as the standout performance of the series, stating that "Cynicism never sounded this suave or self-assured". However, AnimeNation's John Oppliger felt Spike's character was mishandled in the English dub, where he was depicted as a "carefree playboy" whose ambivalent taunts "come across as casual off-the-cuff bluffs, unlike his weighty, solemn statements in the Japanese version". Blum himself has called Spike a "gigantic benchmark" in his career and life, saying that "Spike changed everything" for him. He stated that his role as Spike opened up new opportunities for voicing characters, including T.O.M. on Toonami and Jamie on Megas XLR.

In 2009, 2014, and 2022, IGN ranked Spike among the best anime characters of all time. In 2009, Chris Mackenzie ranked Spike as the fourth greatest anime character behind Goku, Astro Boy, and Speed Racer. In 2014, Ramsey Isler ranked him as second greatest behind Shinji Ikari of Neon Genesis Evangelion. At the 2005 Anime Awards from About.com, Spike was nominated in the category "Best Lead Male Character", though he lost to Goku. In 2010, Wired included Spike on its list of the "6 Genre-Tripping Gunfighters Jonah Hex Must Duel FTW!", with writer Scott Thill complimenting his abilities, while also commenting on his presence of heart compared to other equivalent protagonists. In 2013, Complex ranked Spike the fourth most stylish anime character ever, with writer Jian DeLeon commenting that "The Mars-born bounty hunter knows the benefit of a good uniform". According to the director of Yakuza 4, the playable character Shun Akiyama was inspired by Spike in order to bring an aloof personality to contrast lead Kazuma Kiryu. Akiyama would also be voiced by Yamadera.

== See also ==
- List of Cowboy Bebop characters
