= List of Cowboy Bebop episodes =

Cowboy Bebop
- Cowboy Bebop Blu-ray cover by Crunchyroll
- No. of episodes: 26

Release
- Original network: TXN (TV Tokyo), Wowow
- Original release: TV Tokyo broadcast April 3, 1998 – June 26, 1998; Wowow broadcast October 23, 1998 – April 24, 1999

The Japanese anime television series Cowboy Bebop consists of 26 episodes, referred to as "sessions". Most episodes are named after a musical concept of some sort, usually either a broad genre (e.g. "Gateway Shuffle") or a specific song (e.g. "Honky Tonk Women" and "Bohemian Rhapsody"). The show's first run, from April 3 until June 26, 1998, on TV Tokyo, included only episodes 2, 3, 7 to 15, 18 and a special. Later that year, the series was shown in its entirety from October 23, 1998, to April 24, 1999, on the satellite network Wowow.

In the United States, the series was aired repeatedly in late 2001 on Cartoon Network's Adult Swim programming block. In its original run on Adult Swim, episodes 6, 8, and 22 were initially skipped due to their violent and destructive themes in wake of the September 11 attacks. By the third run of the series, all these episodes had premiered for the first time.

The show takes place in 2071 and follows a group of bounty hunters who hunt criminals on their ship, the Bebop. The main characters include Spike Spiegel, a laid-back former member of the Red Dragon Syndicate (a criminal organization) and hotshot ace pilot; Jet Black, a retired cop and the owner of the Bebop; Faye Valentine, a gambling-addicted amnesiac who always finds herself in financial debts; Edward Wong Hau Pepelu Tivruski IV (nicknamed "Ed"), an eccentric computer hacking prodigy from Earth; and Ein, a "data dog" as the group's pet.

A film was released in Japan in September 2001, titled Cowboy Bebop: The Movie (known in Japan as Cowboy Bebop: Knockin' on Heaven's Door). The film takes place between episodes 22 and 23.

== Episodes ==
No.	Title	Directed by	Written by	Storyboarded by	Original air date (TV Tokyo)	Original air date (Wowow)	English air date (Adult Swim)
1	"Asteroid Blues"; Transliteration: "Asuteroido Burūsu" (Japanese: アステロイド・ブルース)	Yoshiyuki Takei	Keiko Nobumoto	Shinichirō Watanabe	—	October 23, 1998	September 3, 2001
Spike Spiegel, a bounty hunter, and his partner Jet Black head to the Tijuana asteroid colony on their ship, the Bebop, to track down a bounty-head named Asimov Solensan. Asimov, also known as "The Red-Eyed Coyote", is wanted for killing members of his own crime syndicate and stealing a cache of a dangerous combat drug known as Bloody-Eye. On the colony, Asimov and his girlfriend, Katerina, are ambushed at a bar by his former syndicate while attempting to sell a vial of Bloody-Eye, but Asimov fights his way out by using the drug himself. Spike later encounters Katerina and reveals to her that he is a bounty hunter searching for Asimov; Spike is assaulted by Asimov and nearly killed before Katerina intervenes. In the confusion, Spike steals Asimov's Bloody-Eye vial before the two leave. Spike later confronts Asimov at a staged drug deal with the stolen vial. Asimov escapes with Katerina in a ship when the two are interrupted by an attack from the syndicate. With Spike giving chase in his own ship, Asimov takes another dose of Bloody-Eye as they rush towards a police blockade. Katerina, realizing they will never escape, shoots Asimov as Spike nears their ship. As Spike approaches Asimov's ship, it is destroyed by attacking police cruisers, forcing Spike to pull away.
2	"Stray Dog Strut"; Transliteration: "Norainu no Sutoratto" (Japanese: 野良犬のストラット)	Ikurō Satō	Michiko Yokote	Shinichirō Watanabe	April 3, 1998	October 30, 1998	September 3, 2001
A bounty takes Spike and Jet to Mars, where their target, Abdul Hakim, is wanted for stealing a valuable lab animal. To avoid capture, Hakim has had plastic surgery to change his appearance. At a bar, Hakim's briefcase containing the animal is stolen. Spike discovers the thief attempting to sell the animal at a pet store and, assuming him to be Hakim, holds him at gunpoint. The case contains a Welsh Corgi. As Spike leaves the store, Hakim attempts to take the dog back, but it escapes, prompting Hakim, Spike, and the group of scientists who had illegally experimented on the dog to give chase. Spike loses Hakim but gains possession of the dog. Jet puts a collar with a tracking device on the dog so he can pinpoint Hakim's location once he steals the dog back. Spike takes the dog for a walk in order to flush out Hakim. The scientists activate a dog whistle to find their "data dog", resulting in the corgi escaping from Spike. All the dogs in the city, including the corgi, chase after the scientists' truck, attracting Hakim's notice. Hakim steals a car, pursues, and grabs the dog, while Spike and the scientists pursue him. The dog is able to manipulate the car door and jumps out. Spike reluctantly lets Hakim go in order to save the dog by catching it with his ship. The scientists use a harpoon on the truck to shoot Hakim's vehicle, causing both to lose control and crash over the side rails of a bridge and onto a police station, where they are apprehended. The bounty hunter show "Big Shot" announces that Hakim has turned himself in and provide more information on the "data dog," which has a genetically enhanced intellect. Jet decides to bring the dog, which he names Ein, to live on the Bebop, much to Spike's chagrin.
3	"Honky Tonk Women"; Transliteration: "Honkī Tonku Wimen" (Japanese: ホンキィ・トンク・ウィメン)	Kunihiro Mori	Ryōta Yamaguchi & Keiko Nobumoto	Kazuki Akane	April 10, 1998	November 6, 1998	September 10, 2001
The crew of the Bebop head to a space station casino to try and make some money. Spike is told not to bring too much attention to himself by winning too much but attention comes anyway when he accidentally mixes two poker chips; one with a microchip hidden inside meant for an illegal sale. Faye Valentine, a wanted fugitive drowning in debt, gets captured by Jet and Spike but manages to escape the watchful eye of Ein. Though they lost one of their ships and the woman with the large bounty on her head, they narrowly avoided a double-cross murder attempt with the dealer who wanted the microchip.
4	"Gateway Shuffle"; Transliteration: "Geitowei Shaffuru" (Japanese: ゲイトウェイ・シャッフル)	Yoshiyuki Takei	Sadayuki Murai	Yoshiyuki Takei	—	November 13, 1998	September 10, 2001
After gambling away all the money she obtained, Faye finds a mysterious suitcase aboard a derelict spaceship. Meanwhile, Spike and Jet bump into Twinkle Maria Murdoch, leader of the Space Warriors, a group of eco-terrorists armed with a biological weapon called "Monkey Business", a virus that can transform humans into apes. Faced with the threat by Murdoch's followers to release the virus on heavily-populated Ganymede if she isn't released, the Ganymede government cancels the bounty and forces the Bebop crew to let her go. When Murdoch and her men renege on the deal and launch the virus anyway, Spike and Faye pursue her through the hyperspace gateway. They destroy two of the three virus-laden missiles, but miss the third, prompting the Ganymede government to shut down the spacegate, stopping the missile by trapping it in hyperspace. Spike and Faye narrowly escape the gate before it closes, but Murdoch and her followers are trapped. A container of the virus that Faye recovered from the suitcase and was subsequently slipped into Murdoch's pocket by Spike shatters, turning her and all her sons into monkeys. With the bounty lost, Faye decides to stay on the Bebop with Spike and Jet.
5	"Ballad of Fallen Angels"; Transliteration: "Datenshi-tachi no Baraddo" (Japanese: 堕天使たちのバラッド)	Tetsuya Watanabe	Michiko Yokote	Shinichirō Watanabe	—	November 20, 1998	September 24, 2001 (Note: In wake of the September 11 attacks, Cowboy Bebop did not air on Adult Swim on the night of September 16–17, 2001.)
Rivals of two Martian crime syndicates form a truce that is interrupted when a man named Vicious comes in with henchmen to kill them all. Spike has past ties to one of the aforementioned crime syndicates, the Red Dragon, but refuses to explain further to a frustrated Jet (who likewise has his own past, regarding his prosthetic arm, that he refuses to divulge). Spike tries to get information from an old contact named Annie, who had thought him dead for years. Returning to the Bebop for enough ammo to "pay back a debt" and face off against Vicious, Spike gets a video message revealing Faye had been captured by Vicious after trying to go after a bounty on the Red Dragon crime boss, whom Vicious had already killed. An impressive fight at a cathedral results in Spike being flung out a window, seeing his past life flash before his eyes, but ultimately surviving with Faye beside him back on the Bebop.
6	"Sympathy for the Devil"; Transliteration: "Akuma o Awaremu Uta" (Japanese: 悪魔を憐れむ歌)	Ikurō Satō	Keiko Nobumoto	Tensai Okamura	—	November 27, 1998	December 17, 2001 (Note: Episode 6 was originally scheduled to air on September 17, 2001 in the United States, but it was pulled from broadcast in wake of the September 11 attacks.)
With the food situation scarce (thanks to a hungry Faye), Jet and Spike are eager to nab another bounty, named Giraffe. There's a chase, with Jet offering some distraction for Spike to pursue Giraffe to a hotel but Spike fails to save his bounty who gets shot and falls out a window. Before dying, Giraffe gives Spike a ring and urges him not to be fooled by the way "he looks". Jet learns from an old bounty hunter friend that Giraffe was friends with someone named Zebra, who supposedly had a child. It's soon discovered this child has not aged for over 30 years due to a hyperspace singularity event when an astral gate exploded and destroyed the rest of his planet. The child can never die or age unless exposed to the stone on the ring, which was formed from the same hyperspace energy. Spike fashions the stone into a bullet and finally manages to break the unaging curse with a single shot between the ageless boy's eyes.
7	"Heavy Metal Queen"; Transliteration: "Hevi Metaru Kuīn" (Japanese: ヘヴィ・メタル・クイーン)	Kunihiro Mori	Michiko Yokote	Tensai Okamura	April 17, 1998	December 4, 1998	September 24, 2001
The crew of the Bebop split up to look for a bounty named Decker with a dragon tattoo on his arm. Spike nurses a hangover and looks for him at a bar but inadvertently finds himself helping a cargo hauler pilot named VT take down a trio of hunters who were harassing a waitress. Spike soon gets outed as a bounty hunter himself, earning VT's disgust. Meanwhile, Faye is in a family friendly restaurant where Decker ends up going to but he quickly escapes after a tattoo ID mix-up by Faye. VT reluctantly helps out Spike and Faye but they all get trapped in an asteroid mine, barely surviving an explosion that kills their bounty. Using the illegal explosives Decker had in his ship, they make it out. Spike recognizes VT as the wife of an old bounty hunter (now deceased) but declines the money she had amassed from a long-running bet where the winner would get the pot if they guessed her name.
8	"Waltz for Venus"; Transliteration: "Warutsu Fō Vīnasu" (Japanese: ワルツ・フォー・ヴィーナス)	Yoshiyuki Takei	Michiko Yokote	Yoshiyuki Takei	April 24, 1998	December 11, 1998	December 24, 2001 (Note: Episode 8 was originally scheduled to air on September 24, 2001 in the United States, but it was pulled from broadcast in wake of the September 11 attacks.)
Three ship hijackers on their way to Venus get intercepted by the Bebop crew and the bounty is collected. A man named Rocco, carrying a wrapped package, spots Spike and tries to rush at him. Rocco is impressed when he gets knocked down and asks for Spike's mentoring and knowledge on how to fight better. Spike reluctantly teaches him to be more fluid in his fighting and after a sudden face-off with some gang members, Rocco gives him the package to take care of until they can meet again the next day. At the Bebop, they find out the package contains a rare plant that can cure Venus sickness. Faye wants to sell it but Jet thinks it's too dangerous to sell something so recently stolen. Spike finds out Rocco stole the plant to sell and pay for surgery to restore his sister's eyesight. The gang he stole from come after him and after an intense gunfight where Rocco manages to successfully implement a move he learned from Spike, both the rare flower and Rocco die. Luckily, a few seeds were hidden away in a music box that Rocco's sister kept, and thus, even in death, he was able to help her get the surgery.
9	"Jamming with Edward"; Transliteration: "Jamingu Wizu Edowādo" (Japanese: ジャミング・ウィズ・エドワード)	Ikurō Satō	Dai Satō	Shinichirō Watanabe	May 1, 1998	December 18, 1998	October 1, 2001
A ravaged South America has been getting animals lasered onto its surface but no one seems to know why. The Bebop crew only get interested when they hear there's a bounty on the supposed hacker that must have gained access to the satellite doing the lasering. Interviews of the Earth citizens keep bringing up an elite computer hacker nicknamed "Radical Edward" but there's no general consensus on what this radical hacker looks like or where they could be. What no one knows is that the satellite "grafitti" was being caused by a lonely A.I. and the hacker, Ed, is actually a young girl. Radical Ed hacks into the Bebop systems and makes a deal with Faye; she'll help them collect the bounty if they let her join their team. In the end, the bounty is rescinded because there was no hacker that caused the A.I. to activate its lasers but Radical Ed joins the Bebop ship whether they want her to or not ‒ thanks to her shaky control of their computer navigation system.
10	"Ganymede Elegy"; Transliteration: "Ganimede Bojō" (Japanese: ガニメデ慕情)	Hirokazu Yamada	Akihiko Inari	Yūji Yamaguchi	May 8, 1998	December 25, 1998	October 1, 2001
Jet is even more taciturn than usual as the Bebop lands on Ganymede, his last post before leaving the ISSP (Inter Solar System Police). He visits his ex-girlfriend, Alisa, at her bar. She is planning to leave with her boyfriend, Rhint, since the bar is going to be foreclosed and she has several debts. Jet holds no animosity towards Alisa but wants to know why she left him with just a pocketwatch and a note that said "farewell". She brushes him off, offering platitudes, and doesn't explain until the end. After Spike gets a tip about a bounty on the head of Alisa's boyfriend, Jet tells him to leave it, vowing he won't let them escape as he used to be the type of cop who never let things go. He corners them both and Alisa says her boyfriend only has a bounty on his head because he killed a man trying to come after her for debt money. She finally tells Jet she broke up with him because she never got a chance to make her own choices or mistakes. Although Rhint does get arrested, Jet thinks he may get out on self defense charges. As Jet leaves his planet and his former love, he tosses the broken pocketwatch, heeding Alisa's words that time does not stand still and so he moves on.
11	"Toys in the Attic" ("Heavy Rock of the Dark Night"); Transliteration: "Yamiyo no Hevi Rokku" (Japanese: 闇夜のヘヴィ・ロック)	Kunihiro Mori	Michiko Yokote	Kunihiro Mori	May 15, 1998	January 1, 1999	October 8, 2001
What starts as a normal day with no bounty hunting turns into a scene of terror when a blob with a venomous bite infiltrates the Bebop. Jet is the first to get bitten when he goes into attic section of their ship and finds an old refrigerator. With a terribly stocked first aid kit, Jet gets worse and after trying to rule out what the virus or creature could be, Faye gets attacked in the bath. Spike and Ed quickly suit up with heat-seeking goggles but Ein, who had noticed and barked at the creaure since the beginning, is the next to get attacked. Giggling Ed is no help so it's down to Spike who realizes the creature sort of evolved from a rare Ganymede lobster he stowed away in the attic fridge for over a year. He uses the airlock to blast out the rotting contents of the fridge and the mutated blob creature. He still gets bit and joins his fellow crew in recovery. The only one who managed to avoid attack was Ed, who ate the blob in a sleepy stupor.
12	"Jupiter Jazz (Part 1)"; Transliteration: "Jupitā Jazu (Zenpen)" (Japanese: ジュピター・ジャズ(前編))	Yoshiyuki Takei	Keiko Nobumoto	Tensai Okamura	May 22, 1998	January 8, 1999	October 8, 2001
Faye cleans out the crew's safe and leaves the Bebop for Callisto. Jet and Spike get into an argument when Jet wants to look for Faye and get their money back but Spike wants to follow up on a clue for the location of his old girlfriend, Julia. Another person from Spike's past, Vicious, ends up on Callisto, trying to carry out a deal of a large cache of Bloody-Eye from a mysterious seller. Faye gets the attention of jazz saxophonist, Gren, while at a jazz bar and ends getting saved by him when she gets jumped by some men in an alley. Though initially brusque, Faye warms up to Gren and they talk about loneliness. After seeing photos of Gren and Vicious together on the wall, Faye draws a gun on Gren in the shower and is shocked at to see Gren has breasts. Spike manages to find Vicious, angry that he used Julia's name for the Bloody-Eye deal, thus making his search for her a waste of time. He aims a gun at Vicious but Lin, someone Spike knew in his younger years at the Red Dragon syndicate, steps in to bodily protect Vicious. Spike's hesitation results in Lin shooting him, leaving Spike's fallen body in the snow.
13	"Jupiter Jazz (Part 2)"; Transliteration: "Jupitā Jazu (Kōhen)" (Japanese: ジュピター・ジャズ(後編))	Ikurō Satō	Keiko Nobumoto	Tensai Okamura	May 29, 1998	January 15, 1999	October 15, 2001
Gren tells Faye about his connection to Vicious. They had served together as soldiers on a planetary war where Gren looked up to him and considered him a comrade. He was then betrayed by Vicious and incarcerated, experimented on, and ultimately the hormonal experimentation left him Gren with female attributes. He is the Red-Eye dealer who requested Vicious to get information and closure. He handcuffs Faye after she tries another attack and Jet, who had been questioning people the previous episode, eventually finds her. Once again, Spike's past life flashes before his eyes, with memories of wanting to leave the syndicate with Julia and killing people alongside Vicious. He wakes up, realizing he was shot with a tranquilizer and he heads off to find Vicious. Vicious double-crosses Gren and Lin dies taking a bullet for Vicious. Spike and Gren chase after Vicious in their small ships. Gren, however, planted an explosive in the Red-Eye bag, which nearly takes down Vicious but is ultimately unsuccessful. Spike learns a little more about Julia from Gren, before taking Gren to Titan, fulfilling the soldier's dying wish. Spike returns to the Bebop, exchanging few words but ultimately reconciling with Jet.
14	"Bohemian Rhapsody"; Transliteration: "Bohemian Rapusodi" (Japanese: ボヘミアン・ラプソディ)	Hirokazu Yamada	Dai Satō	Toshiyuki Tsuru	June 5, 1998	January 22, 1999	October 15, 2001
There's a large bounty on the head of the mastermind behind several Astral Gate robberies drawing in several bounty hunters including the Bebop Crew. After Spike, Jet, and Faye pool their information together (not making much headway capturing the crooks separately), they find the only thing their crooks had in common was receiving a chess piece each. Ed reveals the chess piece has a microchip and plays a virtual game of chess with someone who is soon discovered to be the Chessmaster Hex. Jet finds out the person who coordinated those robberies was a genius programmer who used to work for the Astral Gate company and got fired for pointing out defects. The Bebop crew manage to trace him to a junkyard and they're tailed by a bounty hunter who almost kills the Chessmaster Hex. It turned out the genius programmer had pre-programmed his revenge plan 50 years ago and went senile in his old age. He is left by the Bebop crew to enjoy his last virtual chess game with Ed.
15	"My Funny Valentine"; Transliteration: "Mai Fanī Varentain" (Japanese: マイ・ファニー・ヴァレンタイン)	Kunihiro Mori	Keiko Nobumoto	Tensai Okamura	June 12, 1998	January 29, 1999	October 22, 2001
While cleaning after Ein, Faye relates the story of her past. She was cryogenically frozen after being critically injured in an explosion. She stayed in cryogenic sleep for 54 years until she was healed and awoke to no memory of what happened and over 300 million in medical debt. A man named Whitney, claiming to be an insurance lawyer, explained what happened and brings her back when she runs away, horrified over not being able to pay. She falls for Whitney but after getting pursued by a collection agency, he gets caught in an explosion. After his apparent death, she found herself the sole heir of his debts and it soon becomes apparent he's a con man. Jet captures the small bounty on his head, not realizing his connection to Faye, though Spike knows since he overheard her story. Faye ends up busting Whitney out and nearly escapes with him until she finds out he had lied about several other things, including her real name. She ultimately turns him over for the bounty and despite still being uncertain of her past, Spike tells her that her future is what counts.
16	"Black Dog Serenade"; Transliteration: "Burakku Doggu Serenāde" (Japanese: ブラック・ドッグ・セレナーデ)	Ikurō Satō	Michiko Yokote	Shigeyasu Yamauchi	—	February 12, 1999	October 22, 2001
Jet's former partner, Fad, calls him to ask for help locating a prison inmate who led a prison riot on a prison ship and commandeered it. The man, Udai Taxim, is responsible for Jet losing his arm. Jet leaves the Bebop and joins Fad on a search where he tracks Udai to Europa and goes into the heavily armed ship alone. He takes several hits but manages to come face to face with Udai and after a fight it's revealed that Jet's partner was a crooked cop who worked for their Syndicate, and fired the bullet that took out Jet's arm. Fad shoots Udai and doesn't deny the accusation, before pulling out a gun, and firing at Jet. Luckily, an injured Jet manages to shoot him first and finding no bullets in Fad's gun except for one shell (from shooting Udai), Jet offers his dying partner one last cigarette before limping away.
17	"Mushroom Samba"; Transliteration: "Masshurūmu Sanba" (Japanese: マッシュルーム・サンバ)	Kunihiro Mori	Michiko Yokote & Shinichirō Watanabe	Shinichirō Watanabe	—	February 19, 1999	October 29, 2001
With no food or fuel left, the Bebop is sideswiped in a hit-and-run and make a crash landing. Ed and Ein are sent to look for food while the men try to repair the ship. Ed and Ein manage to stow away in the trunk of a woman's car and they get caught in the middle of a gun fight between Domino Walker, a hallucinogenic mushroom dealer, and Shaft, the vengeance-seeking brother of a man who died after eating those mushrooms. Ed gets some of the mushrooms and takes them back to the ship where she leaves them out for the rest of the crew to eat. She determines they were not good mushrooms and goes after the bounty on Domino after seeing a report about him on "Big Shot". A train chase involving the woman from before, the vengeance-seeking brother, the confused mushroom dealer, and Ed and Ein end with a cow on the tracks and a bag of mushrooms given to Ein in exchange for not being taken to jail. Unfortunately, they were not the valuable hallucinogenic kind; they were regular shiitake kind.
18	"Speak Like a Child"; Transliteration: "Supīku Raiku A Chairudo" (Japanese: スピーク・ライク・ア・チャイルド)	Yoshiyuki Takei	Akihiko Inari	Junichi Sato	June 19, 1998	February 26, 1999	October 29, 2001
While Faye wastes money betting on horse racing, a package addressed to her arrives on the Bebop containing an old Betamax tape, prompting Spike and Jet to look for an appropriate device to view its contents. After wrecking a Betamax player at an antiques shop and stealing the wrong player from an underground city, the two get a follow-up delivery with the appropriate video player. The tape proves to be a time capsule recording made by a hopeful, encouraging teenage Faye, but Faye finds her pre-amnesia self unrecognizable.
SP	"Mish-Mash Blues"; Transliteration: "Yoseatsume Burūsu" (Japanese: よせあつめブルース)	Shinichirō Watanabe	Keiko Nobumoto & Shinichirō Watanabe	—	June 26, 1998	—	—
The characters provide a philosophical commentary and it ends with the words: "This Is Not The End. You Will See The Real 'Cowboy Bebop' Someday!"
19	"Wild Horses"; Transliteration: "Wairudo Hōsesu" (Japanese: ワイルド・ホーセス)	Hirokazu Yamada	Akihiko Inari	Umanosuke Iida	—	March 5, 1999	November 5, 2001
Spike takes his mono-racer to Earth for maintenance with trusted mechanic, Doohan. An excitable baseball fan, Miles, is his relatively new assistant. Jet and Faye go after a group of pirates who evade capture by transferring computer viruses to the Bebop and their smaller pod ships, via grappling hooks. Spike soon joins them in trying to find the hacker hijackers. Spike chases after the hackers and gets the virus shot into his ship's system. He attempted to override the computers and fly the mono-racer manually but just when it seemed like he was going to crash, Doohan and Miles came to rescue in a rebuilt, restored NASA shuttle.
20	"Pierrot le Fou" ("Requiem for a Clown"); Transliteration: "Dōkeshi no Chinkonka" (Japanese: 道化師の鎮魂歌)	Yoshiyuki Takei	Sadayuki Murai	Yoshiyuki Takei	—	March 12, 1999	November 5, 2001
A group of men get gunned down by a grinning, maniacal killer named Mad Pierrot. Spike stumbles upon this crime scene after a round of billiards nearby, and he narrowly escapes with his life. Jet contacts an old ISSP buddy of his to get more info on the Mad Pierrot; a man who survived brutal experimentation in an effort to make him a form of super soldier, and sought out revenge from those who tortured him. No one who has ever seen him survived and Spike, despite being wounded, accepts an e-mailed invitation from the Mad Pierrot to meet at a space-themed amusement park. Spike runs around various attractions including a penguin-themed snow scene and a massive rollercoaster, and ends on a shootout on the Main Square where a giant parade of animatronics are due to pass through. Mad Pierrot gets a shot off on Spike but he gets one back and the mentally deteriorated Pierrot cries out in pain, falls down, and gets trampled by the parade.
21	"Boogie Woogie Feng Shui"; Transliteration: "Bugi Ugi Funshei" (Japanese: ブギ・ウギ・フンシェイ)	Ikurō Satō	Sadayuki Murai & Shinichirō Watanabe	Mitsuru Hongo (Note: Credited as Ranta Ushio)	—	March 19, 1999	November 12, 2001
Jet, spurred on by a cryptic e-mail, tries to find an old acquaintance but discovers only his grave on Mars. A girl appears and saves him from being shot by mysterious assassins at the cemetery. The girl turns out to be his acquaintance's estranged daughter, Mei-Fa, an expert in feng shui. She believes that her father sending him the email before his disappearance means he could be alive and she asks Jet's help in finding a "sun stone" that can lead them to her father's location. The sun stone turns out to be a moon rock that was blown off as a result of an Astral Gate accident. They find her father trapped in a hyperspace stream inside an Astral Gate, and by concentrating power on the sunstone, Mei-Fa and her father are able to have one last talk before he dies.
22	"Cowboy Funk"; Transliteration: "Kaubōi Fanku" (Japanese: カウボーイ・ファンク)	Kunihiro Mori	Keiko Nobumoto	Tensai Okamura	—	March 26, 1999	February 15, 2002 (Note: Episode 22 was originally scheduled to air on November 12, 2001 in the United States, but it was pulled from broadcast in wake of the September 11 attacks. The episode was also originally set to air on February 11, 2002, but network programmers had misplaced the episode tape and were forced to rebroadcast a different episode as a direct result.)
A terrorist known as the "Teddy Bomber" has been using explosives hidden in teddy bears to bring down high-rise buildings in protest of humanity's excesses (though he doesn't get a chance to explain his motive until the end). Spike's first attempt to stop him is interrupted by a bounty hunter on a horse known as "Cowboy Andy". Their skirmish leads to the Teddy Bomber escaping. Initially, Jet and Faye don't believe Spike but Ed finds Cowboy Andy online and reveals he's wealthy but has been going around causing damage and being a public nuisance in pursuit of his cowboy hobby. The Bebop crew try to catch the Teddy Bomber at a masquerade party but once again the cowboy nuisance interrupts and he escapes. Jet and Faye realize his obsessive, destructive behavior is quite similar to Spike, who vehemently disagrees. A final duel between Spike and the self-professed cowboy on top of a building results in Andy conceding his hat to the true Space Cowboy, and becoming a samurai instead.
23	"Brain Scratch"; Transliteration: "Burein Sukuratchi" (Japanese: ブレイン・スクラッチ)	Yoshiyuki Takei	Dai Sato	Yoshiyuki Takei	—	April 2, 1999	November 12, 2001
While channel surfing, Spike spots Faye on TV as part of cult called SCRATCH. The leader of SCRATCH is Dr. Londes, whose promises of being able to digitize the soul to escape bodily desires, resulted in about 100 suicides and disappearances. No one seems to be able to find the elderly leader of Scratch, and after receiving a cryptic video message from Faye, Spike is tasked to go find her while Jet and Ed follow one last lead in the form of a SCRATCH-made virtual reality game. With the surprising help of Ein, they find out that Dr. Londes never existed. He was a creation of a 13-year-old hacker in a vegetative state, using the life support machinery to gain some form of consciousness and con other people into becoming like him – a digital mind without a working body.
24	"Hard Luck Woman"; Transliteration: "Hādo Rakku Ūman" (Japanese: ハード・ラック・ウーマン)	Hirokazu Yamada	Michiko Yokote	Tensai Okamura	—	April 9, 1999	November 19, 2001
On the way to Mars, Faye reroutes the Bebop to Earth, so she can look for landmarks she saw in the video recorded by her teenage self. Ed tags along with her and leads her to an orphanage where Ed once lived. The nun in charge gives Ed a picture of her father, who came looking for her a while ago. Faye and Ed find one of the locations in Faye's old video, and Faye is surprised by an old schoolmate. Jet and Spike receive information on a bounty which looks to have a lucrative payoff but it turns out the bounty was fake, set by Ed herself on her father, Siniz Hesap Lütfen Appledelhi, to find him. Ed's father asks if she wants to stay with him, but before Ed can answer, he and his assistant go after a meteorite strike, leaving Ed behind, dumbfounded. Faye finds only ruins where her home used to be and opts to sleep there. Ed leaves the Bebop and Ein goes with her.
25	"The Real Folk Blues (Part 1)"; Transliteration: "Za Riaru Fōkuburūsu (Zenpen)" (Japanese: ザ・リアル・フォークブルース(前編))	Ikurō Satō	Keiko Nobumoto	Shinichirō Watanabe	—	April 16, 1999	November 19, 2001
After the girls leave the Bebop, Spike and Jet drown their sorrows at a bar but get ambushed by members of the Red Dragon Syndicate. They are saved by Shin, brother of Spike's former subordinate Lin, who explains that after Vicious unsuccessfully tried to seize control of the organization, people connected to him are now being hunted down. Jet gets shot in the leg during the shootout but a doctor removes the bullet and they head back to the Bebop. Faye crosses paths with Julia when she helps take out a car of men who were chasing her down. Julia knows Faye is in contact with Spike and asks her to relay a message to meet a pre-determined place only they know. There are flashbacks of Spike trying to convince Julia to leave the Syndicate with him and Vicious threatening Julia with the ultimatum of killing Spike or dying with him. Faye returns to the Bebop and wavers over delivering the message but ultimately tells Spike about Julia. The Bebop is under attack and after escaping in their smaller ships and trading fire with the attackers, Jet encourages Spike to go find what he's lost. Vicious is chained up, ready to face execution for his coup against the leaders of the Syndicate when an explosive diversion helps him escape and with the help of double-crossing gang members, they overthrow the old guard and Vicious declares himself the sole power in the Red Dragon Syndicate. Spike meets Julia at the cemetery where she draws a gun and aims it at him.
26	"The Real Folk Blues (Part 2)"; Transliteration: "Za Riaru Fōkuburūsu (Kōhen)" (Japanese: ザ・リアル・フォークブルース(後編))	Yoshiyuki Takei	Keiko Nobumoto	Shinichirō Watanabe	—	April 23, 1999	November 26, 2001
Reunited, Julia tells Spike about the threat she received from Vicious but instead of killing Spike to spare herself, she chose to run away. She wants to pick up where they left off but after finding Annie shot, Spike resolves to get revenge. Julia stays with him and they shoot their way out when Annie's store is swarmed by Syndicate members. Julia gets shot and dies in Spike's arms. Jet, who was initially dismissive and angry at the trouble Spike brought him, goes looking for him but only finds ominous news. Spike returns to the Bebop to eat with Jet and share a laugh. He tells Jet that Julia died and shares some cryptic words with Faye when she tries to stop him from leaving, reminding him of what she told her about forgetting the past, and revealing that she got her memory back but she found nowhere in her memories she could return to. Spike leaves a crying Faye to storm the Red Dragon's headquarters, memories of his past haunting him but not stopping him from shooting several members. Shin helps him partway through his shootout and tells him where to go to find Vicious before he gets shot and killed. Spike fights his way to the top floor of the Syndicate skyscraper where he and Vicious have one last battle. Trading blows and almost trading weapons, both get injured badly before Spike shoots Vicious in the chest and finally kills him. As Spike stumbles down a set of stairs and faces the remaining Syndicate members, he holds up his fingers in a gun shape and says "bang" before collapsing.

== Theatrical film ==
Title	Directed by	Written by	Storyboarded by	Original release date	English release date
Cowboy Bebop: The Movie (Cowboy Bebop: Knockin' on Heaven's Door) Transliteration: "Kaubōi Bibappu: Tengoku no Tobira" (Japanese: カウボーイビバップ 天国の扉)	Shinichirō Watanabe	Keiko Nobumoto	Shinichirō Watanabe, Takahiro Komori, Toshihiro Kawamoto & Yasuhiro Irie	September 1, 2001	August 11, 2002
Set between episodes 22 and 23 of the original series, the story begins a day before Halloween. Spike Spiegel and Jet Black intercept a store robbery to detain the crooks and collect the small bounty on their heads. Faye Valentine is in the middle of chasing her own small bounty when she's stopped by a tanker truck explosion. She sees the driver escape the explosion unharmed but he does not match her bounty's description so she returns to the Bebop. The others are watching the news coverage and are interested in the 300 million bounty on the person behind the tanker explosion. Spike takes to the streets to find "beans" (specific information on the explosive bio hazard). He ends up in the Martian Moroccan district where a mysterious man gives him a large vase. Jet meets an old contact at the ISSP and only learns that the police force aren't interested in investigating due to petty corruption but the tanker explosion was traced back to Cherious Medical, a pharmaceutical company who never reported the truck missing. With Faye's lackluster help, Edward and Ein identify the driver who survived the tanker explosion as Vincent Volaju, a soldier who is listed as deceased. Ed finds a blue marble in Spike's vase. After some examination, it's determined the marble is connected to the bio hazard explosion, hiding a mutated lymphocyte inside. Ed and Ein manage to track down the hacker that Faye had been chasing and they tip her off before joining some kids to trick or treat. What no one knew was that the hacker had been collaborating with Vincent who found no more use for him and kills the hacker by shooting one of the many marbles in his possession. Faye finds the hacker hacking up a cough and dropping dead, then she becomes infected but is subdued by Vincent. Spike managed to infiltrate Cherious Medical and planted a locator on a female employee, Electra Ovilo, following her to a train where he fights Vincent but ultimately ends up getting shot and thrown off the train into the river below. Electra corners him but does not shoot Vincent, seemingly knowing him. He releases a bomb with the bio hazard which affects every passenger on the train except her. Spike is fished out of the river by an old Shaman friend and he's taken back to the Bebop to recover. After some computer hacking by Ed, they find out the supposed pharmaceutical company was a cover for building protein nanobots, which were mimicking the lymphocytes, and were meant to be the ultimate weapon. While looking for the man who sold him the vase, Spike finds out the organic microscopic robots were tested on soldiers but so was a vaccine, which was only injected into Vincent who went AWOL and insane. He relates much of this information to Faye, who was inoculated with his blood and is now unaffected by the nanobots. Electra is discovered to also have the vaccine in her blood, meaning she was also in contact with Vincent. Both she and Spike are captured by soldiers who work for Cherious Medical. In their cells, Electra explains how she fell in love with Vincent while they were fighting on Titan. Vincent explains to Faye his plan to infect the world with a mutated version of the nanobots, killing everyone. He leaves her tied up to get his Halloween plan in motion. After overtaking a security guard and scientist, Spike and Electra escape, taking bags of vaccines that were made with her blood. Faye also escapes and they all reconvene on the Bebop to coordinate a plan: distribute the vaccine by planes and go to the weather station to generate rain that would get the vaccines spread all across the city. Spike finds Vincent on top of a tower and after an intense fight and some taunting, he detonates several Jack-o-lantern parade floats, unleashing the biohazard nanobots into a huge crowd of parade goers. Electra catches up to them and shoots Vincent who is awash in glowing butterflies ‒ a hallucination every person infected with nanobots sees before death. Vincent's final words are that he remembers Electra, and that his moments with her were the only thing that felt real. The vaccine seems to wash over everyone and back on the Bebop Spike muses on how lonely Vincent must have felt before seeing a glowing butterfly.
