= EuCorVac-19 =

Vaccine candidate against COVID-19

Vaccine description
- Target: SARS-CoV-2
- Vaccine type: Protein subunit

Clinical data
- Routes of administration: Intramuscular

Identifiers
- CAS Number: 2696268-42-3

EuCorVac-19 is a COVID-19 vaccine candidate developed by EuBiologics Co.

== Clinical trials ==
=== Phase I/II ===
EuBiologics Co., Ltd started the study on February 23, 2021. The study is titled "Safety, Tolerance and Immunogenicity of EuCorVac-19 for the Prevention of COVID-19 in Healthy Adults" As of April 26, 2021, the trial is ongoing, and participants are being accepted. It has an expected primary completion date of March 2022. The study is anticipated to be completed in January 2023.

=== Phase III ===
EuBiologics registered a phase III trial with a starting date of October 1, 2022 in the Philippines.
