= AdCLD-CoV19 =

Vaccine candidate against COVID-19

Vaccine description
- Target: SARS-CoV-2
- Vaccine type: Viral vector

Clinical data
- Routes of administration: Intramuscular

Identifiers
- CAS Number: 2698316-99-1

AdCLD-CoV19 is a COVID-19 vaccine candidate developed by Cellid Co, a company from South Korea.

A phase 1/2 trial of a single injection of AdCLD-CoV19 began in December 2020 in South Korea. In September 2021, a phase 1 trial began for a single injection of another version, named AdCLD-CoV19-1. Preclinical studies of a single dose in mice and non-human primates for this vaccine candidate were published in April 2022. In August 2022, a phase 2 trial of 1 or 2 doses of AdCLD-CoV19-1 was registered.
