= Universal coronavirus vaccine =

Vaccine that prevents infection from all strains of coronaviruses

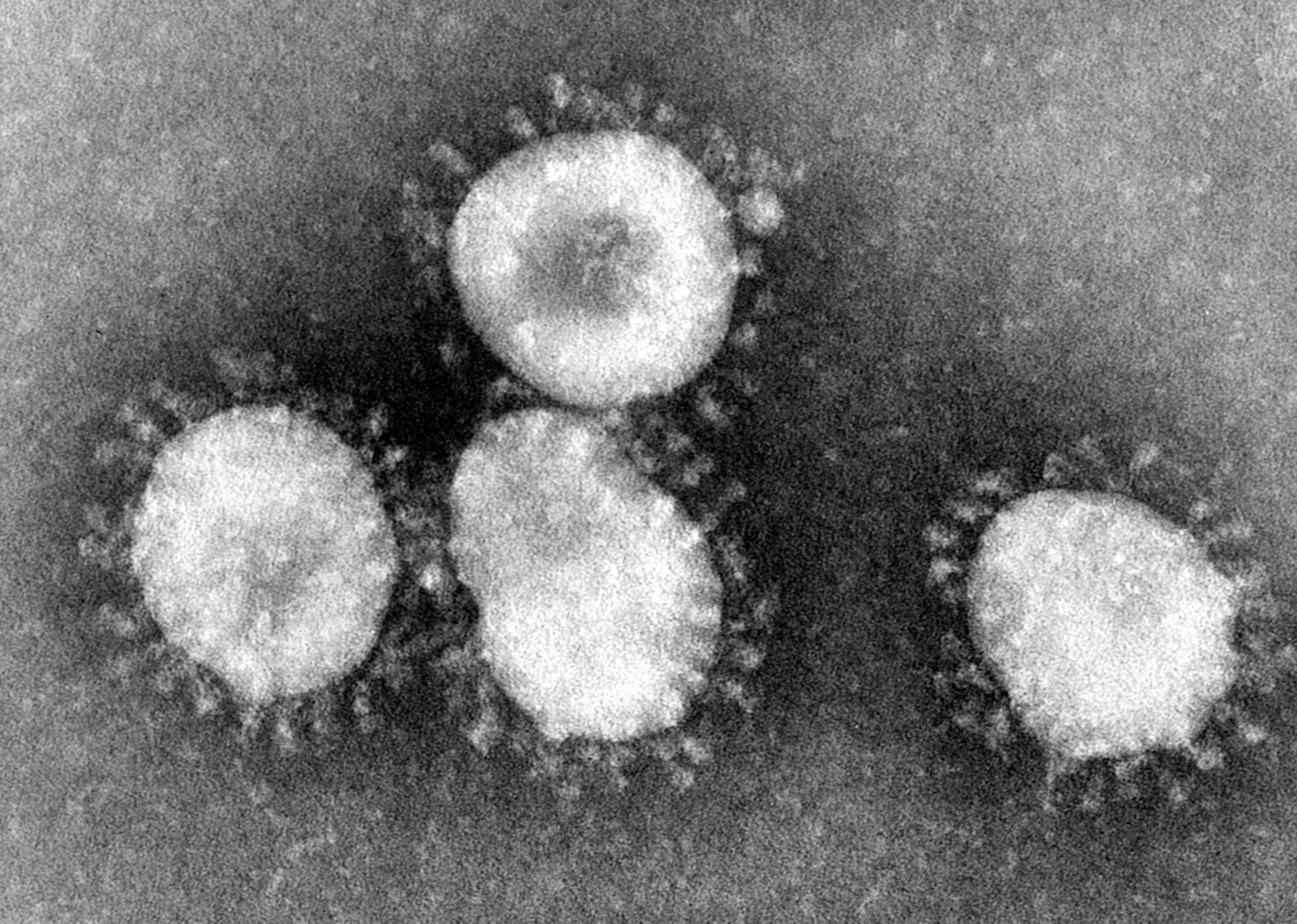
Transmission electron micrograph of a coronavirus.

A universal coronavirus vaccine, also known as a pan-coronavirus vaccine, is a theoretical coronavirus vaccine that would be effective against all coronavirus strains. A universal vaccine would provide protection against coronavirus strains that have caused disease in humans, such as SARS-CoV-2 (including all its variants), while also providing protection against future coronavirus strains. Such a vaccine has been proposed to prevent or mitigate future coronavirus epidemics and pandemics.

While the first patents were filed for a universal coronavirus vaccine in 1993, efforts to develop a universal coronavirus vaccine intensified in early 2020. In December 2021, NIAID director Anthony Fauci, virologist Jeffery K. Taubenberger, and David M. Morens endorsed the development of durable universal coronavirus vaccines and advocated in favor of "an international collaborative effort to extensively sample coronaviruses from bats as well as wild and farmed animals to help understand the full 'universe' of existing and emerging coronaviruses", including already identified animal coronaviruses with pandemic potential. In March 2022, the Biden administration released the "National COVID-19 Preparedness Plan," which, in part, discusses plans to "accelerate research and development toward a single COVID vaccine that protects against SARS-CoV-2 and all its variants, as well as previous SARS-origin viruses".

== Strategies ==
One strategy for developing such vaccines was developed at Walter Reed Army Institute of Research (WRAIR). It uses a spike ferritin-based nanoparticle (SpFN). This vaccine began a Phase I clinical trial in April 2021.

Another is to attach vaccine fragments from multiple strains to a nanoparticle scaffold. One theory is that a broader range of strains can be vaccinated against by targeting the receptor-binding domain, rather than the whole spike protein.

== Projects ==
In 1993, SmithKline Beecham filed a patent for an early recombinant universal coronavirus vaccine targeting a highly conserved 124-amino-acid domain within the C-terminal portion of the spike protein. The project sought to provide cross-species protection against a broad range of human and animal coronaviruses by utilizing a stable polypeptide sequence shared across the Coronaviridae family.

Pan-coronavirus vaccine candidates include variant-proof vaccines such as SpFN, developed by the US Army. It uses a ferritin nanoparticle with prefusion-stabilized spike antigens from the Wuhan strain. Another candidate is RBD–scNP, which is a sortase A-conjugated ferritin nanoparticle with receptor-binding domain (RBD) antigens. GRT-R910 is a self-amplifying mRNA delivering spike and T cell epitopes. hAd5-S+N delivers spike and nucleocapsid antigens via human adenovirus serotype 5 vector. MigVax-101 is an adjuvanted oral subunit vaccine with RBD and nucleocapsid domains.

Among the pan-sarbecovirus vaccines are GBP511, a mosaic nanoparticle containing RBDs from SARS-CoV-1, SARS-CoV-2 and 1–2 bat coronaviruses that entered a Phase I/II clinical trial in early 2026. Another vaccine candidate, which is entering clinical development, is Mosaic-8b, a mosaic nanoparticle containing RBDs from SARS-CoV-2 and 7 animal coronaviruses. VBI-2901 uses virus-like particles expressing prefusion spike of SARS-CoV-2, SARS-CoV-1 and MERS-CoV. UB-612 contains SARS-CoV-2 S1-RBD protein and synthetic peptides representing T cell (Th and CTL) epitopes on the nucleocapsid, spike and membrane proteins.

Pan-betacoronavirus vaccines include DIOS-CoVax, a needle-free antigen injection. A separate pan-sarbecovirus candidate developed using DIOSynVax technology, pEVAC-PS, completed a Phase I trial in 39 healthy volunteers across four dose levels, finding the DNA-based, needle-free vaccine safe and well tolerated with no serious adverse events. Immunogenicity was modest and variable: participants developed measurable but limited antibody responses to conserved sarbecovirus epitopes, and the trial found no increase in cross-neutralization against SARS-CoV-1.

The Interferon Beta Integrated SARS-CoV-2 (IBIS) vaccine takes its name from its comprising a live-but-defective SARS-CoV-2 virus that is envelope-deficient and has the ORF8 segment replaced by interferon-beta. Administered nasally, it protected humanized mice and hamsters from both SARS-CoV-1 and SARS-CoV-2.

== See also ==
- Universal flu vaccine
- COVID-19 vaccine
