= Protein nanoparticles =

Protein Nanoparticle

Protein nanotechnology is a field of research that integrates the diverse physicochemical properties of proteins with nanoscale technology. This field assimilated into pharmaceutical research to give rise to a new classification of nanoparticles termed protein (or protein-based) nanoparticles (PNPs). PNPs garnered significant interest due to their favorable pharmacokinetic properties such as high biocompatibility, biodegradability, and low toxicity. Together, these characteristics have the potential to overcome the challenges encountered with synthetic NPs drug delivery strategies. These existing challenges including low bioavailability, a slow excretion rate, high toxicity, and a costly manufacturing process, will open the door to considerable therapeutic advancements within oncology, theranostics, and clinical translational research.

Continued advancement within this field is required for the clinical translation of PNPs. As of 2022, only one PNP formulation (Abraxane) and five VLPs (Gardasil, Ceravix, Mosquirix, Sci-B-Vac, Gardasil9) are approved by the FDA for clinical use. FDA approval of PNPs formulations is restrained by complications arising from in-vivo interactions between PNPs and the biological environment that jeopardize their safety or function. For example, PNPs may undergo protein conformation changes, form a protein corona, or induce inflammation and may risk patient well-being.

== Synthesis methods ==
To capitalize on the favorable characteristics of PNPs, improvements within PNP synthesis methods are being widely explored. Advancements or the development of new synthesis methods are desirable as existing methods (sonochemistry, thermal decomposition, and colloidal/ hydrothermal/microemulsion methods) contribute to systemic toxicity and are limited to hydrophilic drugs. As a result, recent advancements seek to overcome these challenges and achieve commercial-size production.

In addition, newly developed PNP synthesis methods such as electrospray or desolvation provide a more sustainable approach as compared to traditional nanoparticle methods. Unlike synthetic nanoparticles, PNPs can be synthesized under mild conditions and without toxic chemicals or organic solvents. PNPs are also naturally sourced and readily degradable. Yet, despite these advantages and the addition of new synthesis methods, the methods remain relatively expensive and do not deliver full control of PNP size, greatly limiting their application in biomedicine.

Table 1: Common PNP Synthesis Methods
Method	Description	Strengths	Limitations	Size	Influencing Factors	Common Proteins	References
Emulsification	A protein solution is created via mechanical agitation or sonication to create an emulsion system, where the solvent/non-solvent is subsequently removed to form nanoparticles	High encapsulation rate; High stability; Shape control; Cost-effective; Fast	Cannot Manufacture larger NP sizes; Requires surfactants, stabilizers for thermodynamic stability	Size range 100-800 nm	Protein concentration; Relative volume ratio of water and oil	Gelatin Casein	
Desolvation	A desolvating agent is added to a protein solution to induce protein conformational changes that decrease the protein's solubility and precipitate PNPs	High stability; Simple; Small NPs; High encapsulation efficiency - Control over shape and size	Higher risk of agglomeration; Limited to proteins that can be diluted by transporter proteins	Size range 100-700 nm	Protein concentration; Speed, pH, temperature, and addition rate of desolvating agent; Type and concentration of desolvating agent; Stirring rate; Buffer type; Ionic strength; Temperature, pH during cross-linking	Gelatin Albumin Zein Casein	
Electrospray	High voltage is delivered to protein solution to propel solution through a nozzle to create a liquid jet stream and form aerosolized NP droplets	Higher encapsulation efficiency; Simple; Low cost; Continuous manufacture; High yield; High stability; Small size; Mass production	Risk of degradation from shear or thermal stress; Low flow	Size range 50-500 nm	Nozzle diameter; Magnitude of applied voltage; Flow rate	Gliadin ELPs	
Self-Assembly	A protein solution exceeds the critical micelle concentration and critical solution temperature to produce NP micelles	High encapsulation rate; Small size; High stability	Difficult to control the size and shape; Risk of degradation from strain	Size range 10-150 nm	Protein charge, surface area, and steric forces; Protein and nucleic acid interactions	Gelatin Casein Albumin Zein	
Nano Spray Drying	A protein solution is combined with nitrogen and carbon dioxide gas and emitted through a nozzle. An electrode is used to collect aerosolized NPs	Cost-effective; Fast; Simple; Readily encapsulates hydrophilic or heat-sensitive drugs; Control over particle size	Small scale production; Difficult to incorporate hydrophobic drugs	Size range 300-5000 nm	Nozzle size; Flow rate	Albumin	

== Types of protein ==
Numerous proteins are utilized in PNP synthesis. They are often sourced naturally from animal and plant sources. Accordingly, generally shared advantages of animal proteins include high biocompatibility, biodegradability, non-immunogenicity, drug loading efficiency, cell uptake, and easy and cost-effective production. Tables 2–4 below compile the common proteins used in PNP synthesis. The types of PNPs share similar physical properties such as high biocompatibility, non-immunogenicity, high drug efficiency, high biodegradability, and high cell uptake. Due to the abundance of proteins necessary for proper bodily function, the body has developed processes to update proteins into tissues and cells. PNPs take advantage of these natural processes to enhance their cellular uptake. This abundance and the natural sourcing subsequent purification of the proteins also reduce the immunogenic responses and produce low toxicity levels in the body. As the PNPs are degraded, the tissues assimilate the amino acids into energy or protein production.

Table 2: Common Animal Proteins Used to Fabricate PNPs
Protein	Source(s)	Strengths	Limitations	Nanoarchitectures	References
Gelatin	Skin, Bones, and Connective Tissues of Animals	Biocompatible; Biodegradable; FDA approved safety; Easy to crosslink; Easy to sterilize; Inexpensive	Low mechanical strength; Quick degradation	Microspheres	
Albumin	Blood	Non-toxic; Non-immunogenic; Biocompatible; Biodegradable; High binding capacity; Versatile; Water-soluble; Simple preparation	Costly procurement	Nanospheres Nanocapsules	
Casein	Milk	Cost effect; High stability; Easy procurement; High stability; High binding capacity; High-temperature resistance; Durable to mechanical forces	Potential for allergic reactions or immunosuppression	Micelles	
Silk	Silkworm and Spider Excretions	Low inflammatory response; Low decomposition rate; Mechanically flexible; High mechanical strength; Good stability; Low immunogenicity; Biodegradable; Biocompatible; Cost-effective	Potential for allergic reactions	Nanospheres Micelles	

Table 3: Common Plant Proteins Used to Fabricate PNPs
Protein	Source(s)	Strengths	Limitations	Nanoarchitectures	References
Zein	Corn (Maize)	Biodegradable; Can carry hydrophobic drugs; Non-toxic; Low water absorption; High-temperature resistance	Easily aggregate in water; Sensitive to enzymatic degradation	Nanospheres Nanocapsules	
Gliadin	Wheat Gluten	Biocompatible; Biodegradable; Nontoxic; High stability; Low solubility; Non-immunogenicity	Large particle size; Rapid degradation	Nanospheres	
Lectin	Plants and the Meat, Milk, and Eggs of Animals	High stability; Low toxicity; Low immunogenicity; Resistance to degradation	Poor clinical sensitivity and specificity	Nanospheres	
Legumin	Soybeans	Small size; High stability; Low antigenicity	Low yield	Nanospheres	

Table 4: Recombinant Proteins Used to Fabricate PNPs
Protein	Source(s)	Strengths	Limitations	Nanoarchitectures	References
Elastin-Like Polypeptides (ELPs)	Human Tropoelastin	-Non-immunogenic: Control over molecular weight; Production of single-sized polymers; Can bind to several drugs at once; Tunable pharmacokinetic properties; Environmentally responsive	Limited predictability of pharmacokinetic properties	Micelles	
Virus-Like Proteins (VLPs)	Viral Proteins (without Genetic Material) and Recombinant Viral Proteins	Targets EPR effect; Safer than traditional vaccines; Small size	Instability; Intrinsic immunogenicity	Nanocapsules	

== Protein nanoparticle modifications ==
PNPs can be chemically modified to increase particle stability, reduce degradation, and enhance favorable characteristics. Crosslinking is a common modification that can utilize synthetic or natural cross-linkers. Natural cross-linkers are significantly less toxic than synthetic cross-linkers.

Driving factors in the modification of PNPs stem from their surface properties (surface charge, hydrophobicity, functional groups, etc.). Functional groups can bind to tissue-specific ligands for targeted drug delivery. Functional ligands may include protein receptors, antibodies, and smaller peptides. The purpose of ligand binding is to direct the PNP to the target cells, thereby reducing systemic toxicity, and improving the retention and excretion of the PNP within tissues. The optimal ligand for PNP modification is dependent on the target cell. Modification of a PNP surface with ligands can be achieved through chemical conjugation, though chemical dyes for imaging and peptides for immune activation can also be attached. One example is the ligand anti-human epidermal growth factor receptor 2 which targets breast cancer cells. The following provides additional applications of ligand modifications and their therapeutic applications.

In addition to chemical conjugation, genetic modification can facilitate direct attachment of the modifying protein monomers with the PNP surface. This results in a co-assembly and a solution to existing challenges with direct attachments or large proteins. Attaching large proteins to PNPs interferes with the self-assembly process and induces steric interactions. Though, smaller protein attachments are generally tolerated by protein NPs. A significant limitation to direct attachment via genetic modification of protein monomers is that it cannot accommodate the attachment of multiple components. Enzymatic ligation helps overcome this limitation by providing a site-specific covalent link to the PNP surface following PNP assembly. This strategy can also provide greater control over the density and ratios of attached proteins.

The modification of VLPs is unique due to their nanocage architecture. PNPs with cage structures can fully encapsulate functional components in their interior, termed co-encapsulation. Drug encapsulation within VLP cages can occur through two processes. This first process occurs in-vitro and requires the disassembly of the cage and reassembling it with the presence of the drug components to be encapsulated. Since loading efficiency is influenced through electrostatic interactions, the drug compounds cannot be fully encapsulated without interfering with the VLP cage self-assembly. Another process is the encapsulation of drug components in-vivo. This involves direct genetic attachment of the drug components to the interior of the VLP cage. This process guides drugs for encapsulation directly to the interior of the cage.

== Therapeutic drug delivery applications ==
Due to PNPs' breadth of favorable pharmacokinetic properties such as high biocompatibility, high biodegradability, high modifiability, low toxicity, high cell uptake, and a fast excretion rate, PNPs are prime candidates for anti-cancer therapy. Previous anticancer therapies relied on the enhanced permeability effect to passively accumulate within tumors. This resulted in greater toxicity due to higher concentrations required to achieve critical drug efficacy levels. Newer strategies allow PNPs to actively target the tumor microenvironment via the attachment of ligands and site-specific protein receptors. Active targeting decreases the total concentration of drugs required to deliver an effective dose, thereby reducing systemic side effects.

In addition to active tumor targeting, PNPs can also be engineered to respond to changing external environments such as pH, temperature, or enzyme concentration. The tumor microenvironment is slightly acidic, so PNPs can be engineered to only release their drug cargo under specific tumor physiological conditions.

Another application is photothermal or photodynamic therapy. PNPs selectively accumulate into the tumor microenvironment where they are subsequently irradiated using a 1064 nm wavelength laser. The light energy is transferred into heat energy, increasing the temperature of the tumor microenvironment to inhibit tumor growth. Ferritin is a favorable protein for this application due to its high thermal stability.

In-vivo imaging is another application of PNPs. PNPs can carry fluorescent dyes that selectively accumulate in the tumor microenvironment. This is important because a significant limitation of Green Fluorescent Protein, the standard protein for tumor imaging, is its insufficient deep tissue penetration. Due to their small size, PNPs can deliver fluorescent dyes deep into the tissue overcoming this challenge and providing more accurate tumor imaging. This strategy may also be applied to MRI imaging using PNPs carrying magnetic components to tumor microenvironments for subsequent scanning.

Other applications include vaccine development through VLPs carrying immunogenic components. Since VLPs are not carrying any attenuated genetic material, these vaccines pose a safer alternative, especially for the immunocompromised or elderly. PNPs may also treat neurological diseases as they can cross the blood-brain barrier. Lastly. PNPs may find applications within ophthalmic drug delivery as PNPs have a significantly longer circulation time in the eye than eye drops.

== Drug delivery challenges and regulations ==
Despite numerous pharmacokinetic advantages of PNPs, there remain several critical challenges to their clinical translation. Only two PNPs have been FDA-approved, despite over 50 PNP formulations to date (2022). The two FDA-approved drugs include Abraxane, an albumin nanoparticle carrying paclitaxel used for breast cancer, non-small cell lung cancer, and pancreatic cancer treatment. The second FDA-approved PNP is Ontak, a protein conjugate carrying L-2 and Diphtheria toxin used for cutaneous T-cell lymphoma. The two approved formulations are summarized in Table 5 below. The low approval rate of PNPs is due to limited existing control over drug encapsulation and the pharmacokinetic variability between PNP batches. Balancing both the repeatability of these two properties and their relative interactions is important because it ensures the predictability of their clinical outcomes, greater patient safety, and that protein loading does not interfere with the PNP's properties.

Another limitation surrounds the cost and ability of large-scale production. Many synthesis methods that can deliver greater homogeneity between produced nanoparticles are also more costly options or cannot achieve mass production. This limitation is compounded by the lower yields of PNP manufacturing. This limits the availability of PNPs to broad clinical adoption.
