= SK Bioscience =

South Korean biotech company

SK Bioscience Co., Ltd.
- Native name: 에스케이바이오사이언스 주식회사
- Type: Public
- Traded as: KRX: 302440
- Industry: Biotechnology
- Founded: 2018; 8 years ago
- Headquarters: Bundang District, Seongnam, Gyeonggi-do, South Korea
- Products: Vaccine
- Number of employees: 1,126 (2024)
- Parent: SK Chemicals
- Website: www.skbioscience.com

SK Bioscience (Korean: SK바이오사이언스) is a South Korean biotechnology company that produces vaccines and other products and is a subsidiary of SK Chemicals.

== History ==
SK Chemicals was responsible for all research and development (R&D), production, and sales of chemically synthesized pharmaceuticals, biopharmaceuticals, natural medicines, blood products, and vaccines, but the blood products division was spun off into SK Plasma and the vaccine division into SK Bioscience in July 2018.

In 2024, it acquired the German global pharmaceutical and biotechnology company Cloquet Group and IDT Biologica, a Contract manufacturing organization (CMO) specialized in pharmaceuticals.

SK Bioscience and SK Biopharm are both part of the SK Group, but their governance structures are different: SK Biopharm is part of the SK Inc., while SK Bioscience is part of the SK Discovery Group.

On 26 September, SK Bio Pharmaceutics stocks was down 1.71% after US President Donald Trump announced fresh tariffs on pharmaceutical products.

== Business ==
The headquarters is located in Bundang District, Seongnam in Gyeonggi-do. The first cell culture vaccine factory in South Korea is SK Bioscience's Andong vaccine factory. This factory was completed in December 2012 with a total investment of 200 billion won, including 160 billion won in facility investment and 40 billion won in research and development.
