= COVID-19 vaccine =

Vaccine against SARS-CoV-2

Vaccine description
- Target: SARS-CoV-2
- Vaccine type: mRNA, viral, inactivated, protein

Clinical data
- License data: US DailyMed: COVID-19 vaccine
- Routes of administration: Mostly Intramuscular, also via nasal spray
- ATC code: J07BN01 (WHO) J07BN02 (WHO), J07BN03 (WHO), J07BN04 (WHO), J07BN05 (WHO)

Identifiers
- CAS Number: None

How COVID‑19 vaccines work. The video shows the process of vaccination, from injection with RNA or viral vector vaccines, to uptake and translation, and on to immune system stimulation and effect.

A COVID‑19 vaccine is designed to induce immunity against SARS-CoV-2, the virus responsible for coronavirus disease 2019 (COVID-19). The vaccines reduce the risk of severe illness, hospitalization, and death from the virus.

They were developed at an unprecedented pace to tackle the COVID-19 pandemic, with the first clinical trials beginning in March 2020. Before approval, vaccines underwent the standard three phases of clinical trials, although phases were conducted in parallel to accelerate development. Vaccines have been developed based on both classical technologies (using inactivated virus or protein subunit) and novel platforms (mRNA or viral vector-based).

Prior research on coronaviruses causing severe acute respiratory syndrome (SARS) and Middle East respiratory syndrome (MERS) accelerated the development of various vaccine platforms in early 2020. The 2023 Nobel Prize in Physiology or Medicine was awarded to Katalin Karikó and Drew Weissman for the development of effective mRNA vaccines against COVID‑19.

Major vaccines include the Pfizer–BioNTech mRNA vaccine, Moderna mRNA vaccine, and the Novavax protein subunit vaccine. With the emergence of new SARS-CoV-2 variants, the original vaccines—particularly Pfizer–BioNTech and Moderna vaccines—have been updated. These "variant-adapted" vaccines are offered as booster doses. The immunity from the vaccines also wanes over time, requiring people to get boosters to maintain protection.

Common side effects include soreness, fatigue, headache, myalgia (muscle pain), and arthralgia (joint pain), which resolve without medical treatment within a few days. They are safe for people who are pregnant or are breastfeeding.

They are widely credited for their role in reducing the spread of COVID‑19 and reducing the severity and death caused by COVID‑19. It is estimated that between 14.4 and 19.8 million deaths were prevented by the vaccine. Many countries implemented phased distribution plans that prioritized those at highest risk of complications, such as the elderly, and those at high risk of exposure, such as healthcare workers. By December 2020, more than 10 billion vaccine doses had been preordered, with about half of the doses purchased by high-income countries comprising 14% of the world's population. As of August 2024, over 13 billion doses of COVID‑19 vaccines have been administered worldwide.

== Background ==
Before COVID‑19, a vaccine for an infectious disease had never been produced in less than several years – and no vaccine existed for preventing a coronavirus infection in humans. However, vaccines have been produced against several animal diseases caused by coronaviruses, including infectious bronchitis virus in birds, canine coronavirus, and feline coronavirus.

Previous projects to develop vaccines for viruses in the family Coronaviridae that affect humans have been aimed at severe acute respiratory syndrome (SARS) and Middle East respiratory syndrome (MERS). Vaccines against SARS and MERS have been tested in non-human animals.

According to studies published in 2005 and 2006, the identification and development of novel vaccines and medicines to treat SARS were priorities for governments and public health agencies worldwide at the time. There is no cure or vaccine proven to be safe and effective against SARS in humans. There is also no proven vaccine against MERS. When MERS became prevalent, it was believed that previous SARS research might provide a useful template for developing MERS vaccines. As of March 2020, there was one (DNA-based) MERS vaccine that completed Phase I clinical trials in humans, and three others in progress, all being viral-vectored vaccines: two based on adenoviruses and one on MVA.

Vaccines that use an inactive or weakened virus that has been grown in eggs typically take more than a decade to develop. In contrast, mRNA is a molecule that can be made quickly, and research on mRNA to fight diseases was begun decades before the COVID‑19 pandemic by scientists such as Drew Weissman and Katalin Karikó, who tested on mice. Moderna began human testing of an mRNA vaccine in 2015. Viral vector vaccines were also developed for the COVID‑19 pandemic after the technology was previously cleared for Ebola.

== Vaccine technologies ==
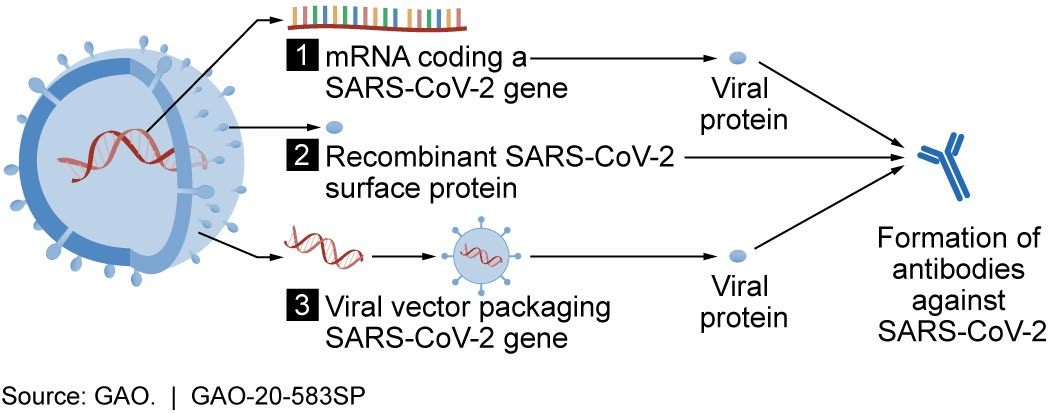
A conceptual diagram showing three vaccine types for forming SARS‑CoV‑2 proteins to prompt an immune response: (1) RNA vaccine; (2) subunit vaccine; (3) viral vector vaccine

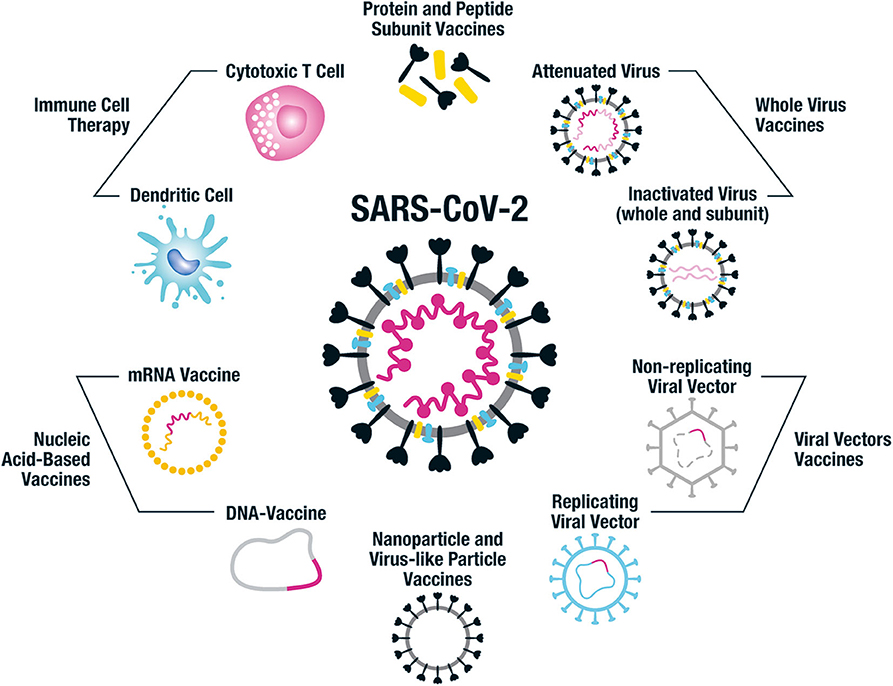
Vaccine platforms that are being employed for SARS-CoV-2. Whole-virus vaccines include both attenuated and inactivated forms of the virus. Protein and peptide subunit vaccines are usually combined with an adjuvant to enhance immunogenicity. The main emphasis in SARS-CoV-2 vaccine development has been on using the whole spike protein in its trimeric form, or its components, such as the RBD region. Multiple non-replicating viral vector vaccines have been developed, particularly focused on adenovirus, while there has been less emphasis on the replicating viral vector constructs.

The initial focus of SARS-CoV-2 vaccines was on preventing symptomatic, often severe, illness. Most of the first COVID‑19 vaccines were two-dose vaccines. Exceptions were the single-dose vaccines Convidecia and the Janssen COVID‑19 vaccine, and vaccines with three-dose schedules, Razi Cov Pars and Soberana.

In July 2021, at least nine different technology platforms were under research and development to create an effective vaccine against COVID‑19. The coronavirus spike protein (S protein), which the virus uses to enter the cell, induces a strong immune response and is therefore the primary target of vaccines.

However, other coronavirus proteins were also being investigated for vaccine development, for example, the nucleocapsid proteins, because they also induce a robust T-cell response, while their genes are more conserved and recombine less frequently. Future generations of COVID‑19 vaccines targeting more conserved genomic regions could be used to treat future variations of SARS-CoV-2, or any similar coronavirus epidemic/pandemic.

Platforms developed in 2020 involved nucleic acid technologies (mRNA and DNA), non-replicating viral vectors, peptides, recombinant proteins, live attenuated viruses, and inactivated viruses.

Many vaccine technologies developed for COVID‑19 use "next-generation" strategies for precise targeting of COVID‑19 infection mechanisms. Several of the synthetic vaccines use a 2P mutation to lock the spike protein into its prefusion configuration, stimulating an adaptive immune response to the virus before it attaches to a human cell.

=== mRNA vaccines ===
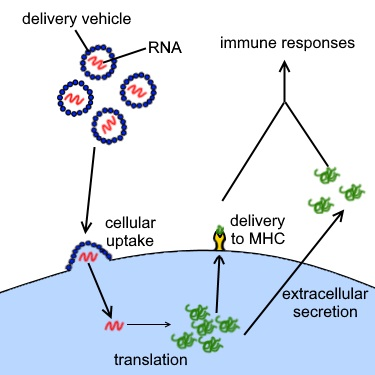
Diagram of the operation of an RNA vaccine. Messenger RNA contained in the vaccine enters cells and is translated into viral proteins, which trigger an immune response.

Several COVID‑19 vaccines, such as the Pfizer–BioNTech and Moderna vaccines, use RNA to stimulate an immune response. When introduced into human tissue, the vaccine contains messenger RNA (mRNA), which causes cells to express the SARS-CoV-2 spike protein. This teaches the immune system to identify and destroy the corresponding pathogen. RNA vaccines often use nucleoside-modified messenger RNA. The delivery of mRNA is achieved by encapsulating the molecule in lipid nanoparticles, which protect the RNA strands and help their uptake into the cells.

mRNA vaccines were the first COVID‑19 vaccines authorised in the United Kingdom, the United States, and the European Union. Authorized vaccines of this type include the Pfizer–BioNTech and Moderna vaccines. The CVnCoV mRNA vaccine from CureVac failed in clinical trials.

Severe allergic reactions to the mRNA vaccines are rare. In December 2020, 1,893,360 first doses of Pfizer–BioNTech COVID‑19 vaccine administration resulted in 175 cases of severe allergic reactions, of which 21 were anaphylaxis. For 4,041,396 Moderna COVID‑19 vaccine dose administrations in December 2020 and January 2021, only ten cases of anaphylaxis were reported. Lipid nanoparticles (LNPs) were most likely responsible for the allergic reactions.

In May 2025, a different version of the Moderna COVID-19 vaccine, with the brand name Mnexspike (mRNA-1283), was approved for medical use in the United States.

In June 2025, the European Medicines Agency announced that it was making data from the marketing authorization applications for COVID‑19 mRNA vaccines Comirnaty and Spikevax publicly available.

=== Viral vector vaccines ===
Viral vector vaccines use a modified version of a virus to generate immunity. For COVID-19, these vaccines were based on a modified adenovirus, which normally causes the common cold. It is first made harmless, by removing the genes that cause illness and those responsible for replication. The virus is further modified so that it contains DNA that encodes a SARS‑CoV‑2 protein. As such, the virus in the vaccine does not make new adenovirus copies, but only produces the antigen that elicits a systemic immune response.

Unlike mRNA vaccines, which usually require freezer storage, DNA vaccines such as adenovirus vector vaccines can be kept in a fridge.

Authorized vaccines of this type include the Oxford–AstraZeneca COVID‑19 vaccine, the Sputnik V COVID‑19 vaccine, Convidecia, and the Janssen COVID‑19 vaccine.

Sputnik V uses Ad26 for its first dose, which is the same as Janssen's only dose, and Ad5 for the second dose, which is the same as Convidecia's only dose. In August 2021, the developers of Sputnik V proposed, in view of the Delta case surge, that Pfizer test the Ad26 component (termed its 'Light' version) as a booster shot.

=== Inactivated virus vaccines ===
Inactivated vaccines consist of virus particles grown in culture and then inactivated by methods such as heat or formaldehyde, thereby losing their disease-producing capacity while still stimulating an immune response.

Inactivated virus COVID-19 vaccines are less efficient than mRNA vaccines, because the process of de-activating the virus causes the spike protein to change slightly, whereas mRNA vaccines show the spike protein in its normal state. This makes parts of the protein inaccessible to the immune system. The immunity does not last as long as with mRNA vaccines, so that additional boosters are required to maintain immunity.

Inactivated virus vaccines authorized in China include the Chinese CoronaVac and the Sinopharm BIBP and WIBP vaccines; there is also the Indian Covaxin, the Russian CoviVac, the Kazakh vaccine QazVac, and the Iranian COVIran Barekat.

=== Subunit vaccines ===
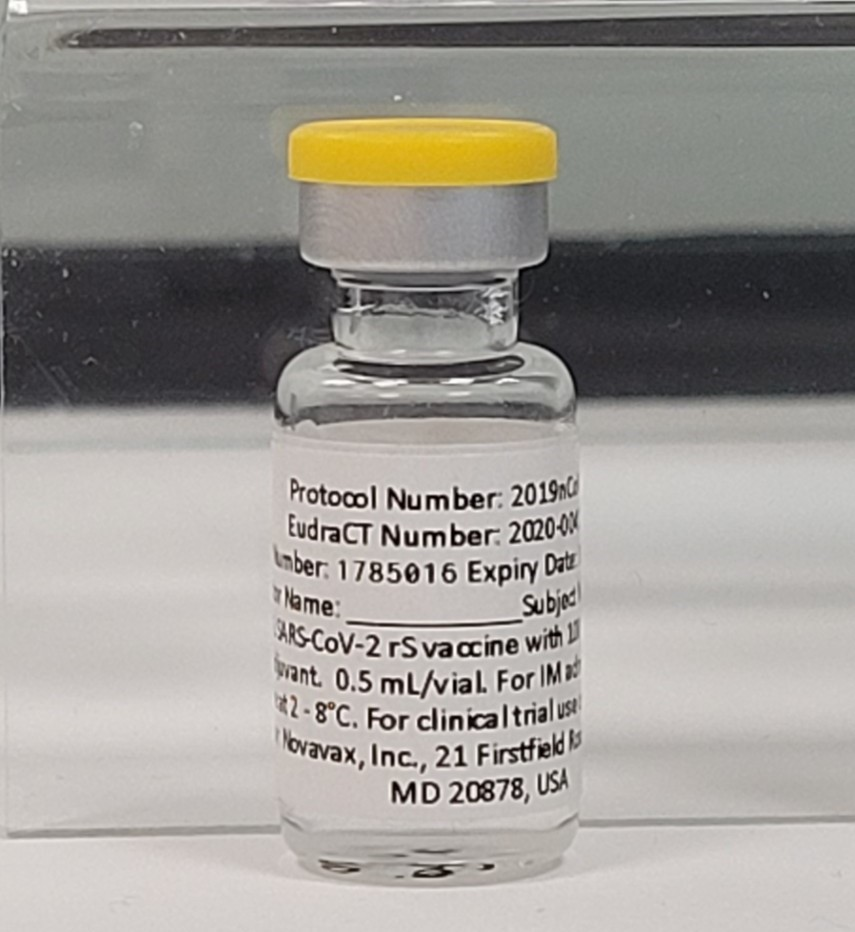
Vial of Novavax vaccine from clinical trials at Thackray Museum of Medicine

Subunit vaccines present one or more antigens without introducing whole pathogen particles. The antigens involved are often protein subunits, but they can be any pathogen-derived molecule or its fragment.

The authorized vaccines of this type include the peptide vaccine ZF2001, MVC-COV1901, Corbevax, the Sanofi–GSK vaccine, and Soberana 02 (a conjugate vaccine). Bimervax (selvacovatein) was approved for use as a booster vaccine in the European Union in March 2023. The Novavax COVID‑19 vaccine is another subunit vaccine. This vaccine is produced by infecting moth cells with a modified baculovirus vector, which contains a gene for a SARS-CoV-2 spike protein.

The clinical trials of V451 vaccine were terminated after it was found that the vaccine may potentially cause incorrect results for subsequent HIV testing.

Virus-like particle (VLP) vaccines are one type of subunit vaccines. They look similar to viruses, but do not contain any RNA or DNA, and are non-replicating. They can be stored in a fridge, rather than using extreme cold like mRNA vaccines. One such vaccine, Covifenz, was authorized for use in 2022 in Canada, but later withdrawn.

=== Other types ===
Additional types of vaccines that are in clinical trials include multiple DNA plasmid vaccines, at least two lentivirus vector vaccines, a conjugate vaccine, and a vesicular stomatitis virus displaying the SARS‑CoV‑2 spike protein.

Scientists investigated whether existing vaccines for unrelated conditions could prime the immune system and lessen the severity of COVID‑19 infections. There is experimental evidence that the BCG vaccine for tuberculosis has non-specific effects on the immune system, but clinical trials showed this vaccine is not effective against COVID‑19.

=== Formulation ===
An immunological adjuvant is a substance formulated with a vaccine to elevate the immune response to an antigen, such as the COVID‑19 virus or influenza virus. Adjuvants used in COVID‑19 vaccine formulations may be particularly effective for technologies using the inactivated COVID‑19 virus and recombinant protein-based or vector-based vaccines.

== Authorized vaccines ==
Map of countries by approval status of COVID‑19 vaccines (2021) Approved for general use, mass vaccination underway EUA (or equivalent) granted, mass vaccination underway EUA granted, mass vaccination planned No data available

By the end of 2022, 50 COVID-19 vaccines had received authorization in one or more countries—meaning they were approved, licensed, or granted emergency use authorization by national regulatory agencies around the world.

The World Health Organization (WHO) monitors circulating strains and the effectiveness of different updated vaccines against them. As of May 2025, the WHO recommends that vaccines targeting JN.1 or KP.2 remain appropriate and that LP.8.1 is a suitable alternative vaccine antigen. The European Medicines Agency recommends updating COVID-19 vaccines to target LP.8.1 for the 2025/2026 vaccination campaign. At the same time, the FDA in the US advised manufacturers that the COVID-19 vaccines beginning in fall 2025 should be JN.1-lineage-based COVID-19 vaccines, preferentially using the LP.8.1 strain.

=== Combination vaccines ===
A combined messenger RNA vaccine for protection against influenza and COVID‑19 was introduced in 2026.

== Delivery methods ==
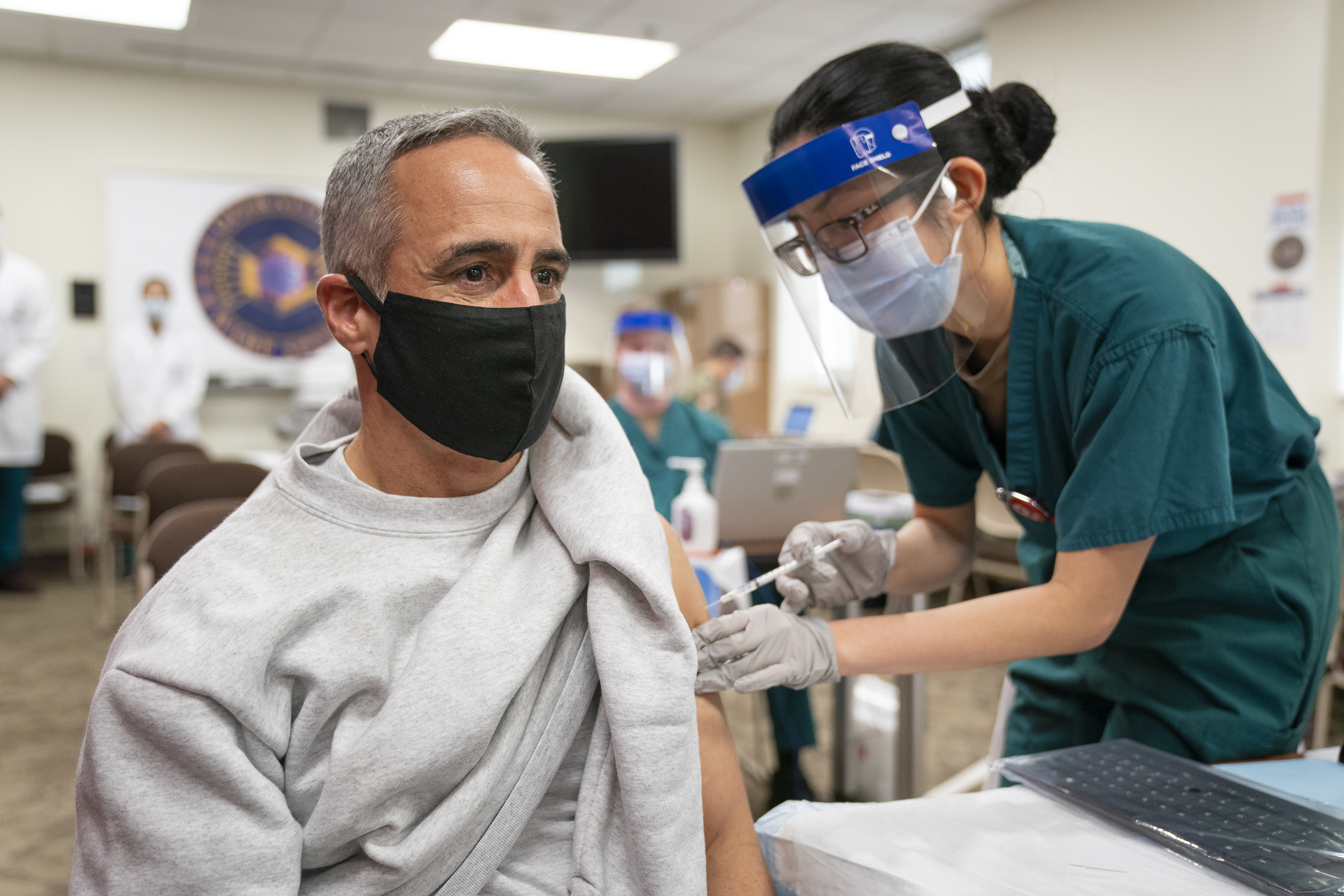
A US airman receiving a COVID‑19 vaccine, December 2020

Most coronavirus vaccines are administered by intramuscular injection, with further vaccine delivery methods being studied for future coronavirus vaccines.

=== Intranasal ===
Intranasal vaccines target mucosal immunity in the nasal mucosa, which is a portal for viral entry into the body. These vaccines are designed to stimulate nasal immune factors, such as IgA. In addition to inhibiting the virus, nasal vaccines provide ease of administration because no needles (or needle phobia) are involved.

A variety of intranasal COVID‑19 vaccines are undergoing clinical trials. The first authorized intranasal vaccine was Razi Cov Pars in Iran at the end of October 2021. The first viral component of Sputnik V vaccine was authorized in Russia as Sputnik Nasal in April 2022. In September 2022, India and China approved two nasal COVID‑19 vaccines (iNCOVACC and Convidecia), which may (as boosters) also reduce transmission (potentially via sterilizing immunity). In December 2022, China approved a second intranasal vaccine as a booster, brand name Pneucolin.

== Universal vaccine ==
A universal coronavirus vaccine would be effective against all coronaviruses and possibly other viruses. The concept was publicly endorsed by NIAID director Anthony Fauci, virologist Jeffery K. Taubenberger, and David M. Morens. In March 2022, the White House released the "National COVID‑19 Preparedness Plan", which recommended accelerating the development of a universal coronavirus vaccine.

One attempt at such a vaccine is being developed at the Walter Reed Army Institute of Research. It uses a spike ferritin-based nanoparticle (SpFN). This vaccine began a Phase I clinical trial in April 2022. Results of this trial were published in May 2024. Other universal vaccines that have entered clinical trial include OVX033 (France), PanCov (France), pEVAC-PS (UK), and VBI-2902 (Canada).

Another strategy is to attach vaccine fragments from multiple strains to a nanoparticle scaffold. One theory is that a broader range of strains can be vaccinated against by targeting the receptor-binding domain, rather than the whole spike protein.

== Development ==
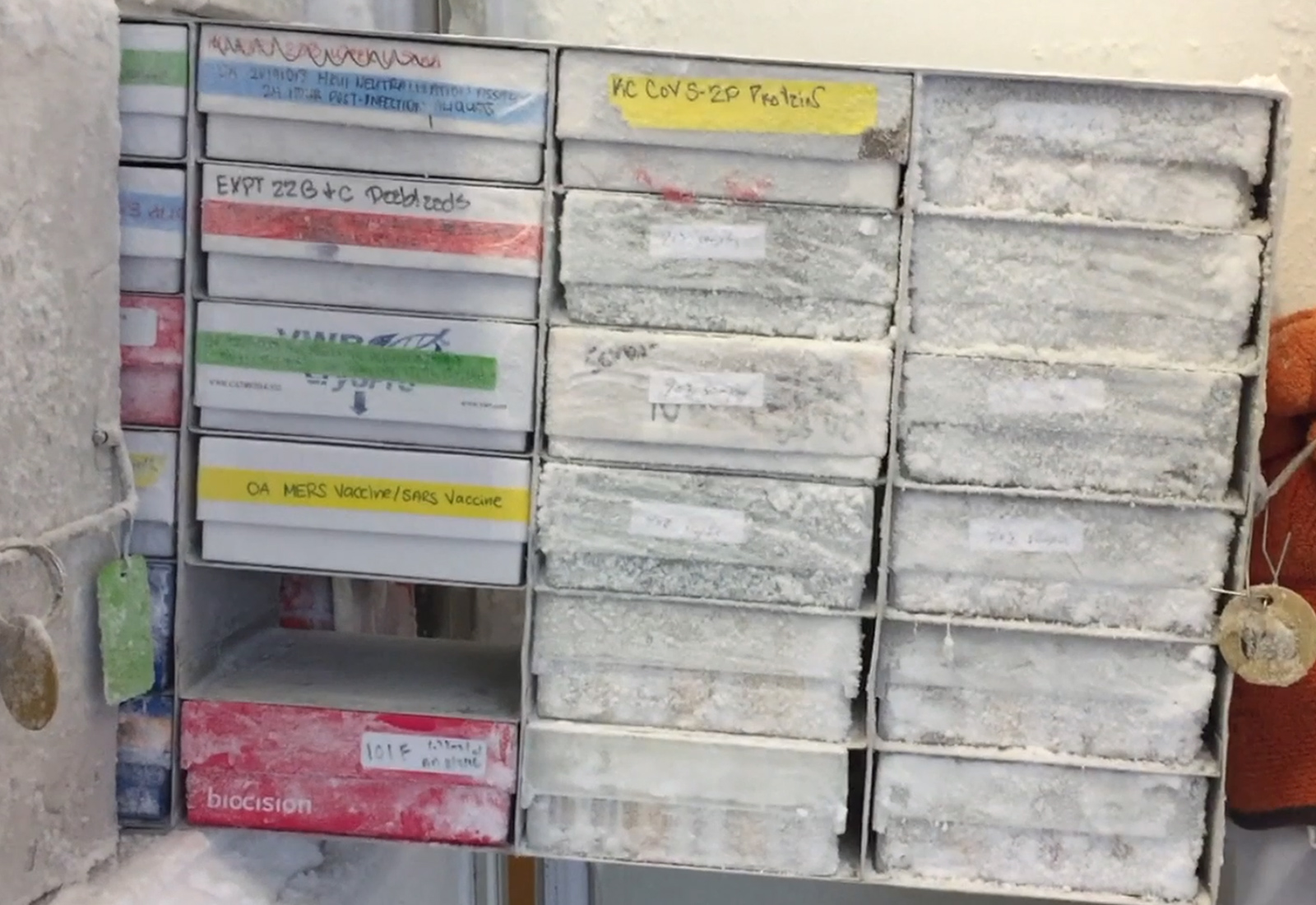
COVID‑19 vaccine research samples in a NIAID lab freezer (30 January 2020)

SARS-CoV-2, the virus that causes COVID-19, was isolated in late 2019. Its genetic sequence was published on 11 January 2020, setting off an intense research effort to develop a COVID-19 vaccine. Vaccine development was expedited via unprecedented collaboration between academia, the pharmaceutical industry and governments. By June 2020, tens of billions of dollars were being invested to develop dozens of vaccine candidates and prepare for global vaccination programs. According to the Coalition for Epidemic Preparedness Innovations (CEPI), the geographic distribution of COVID‑19 vaccine development shows North American entities to have about 40% of the activity, compared to 30% in Asia and Australia, 26% in Europe, and a few projects in South America and Africa.

In February 2020, the World Health Organization (WHO) said it did not expect a vaccine against SARS‑CoV‑2 to become available in less than 18 months. Virologist Paul Offit commented that, in hindsight, the development of a safe and effective vaccine within 11 months was a remarkable feat. The rapidly growing infection rate of COVID‑19 worldwide during 2020 stimulated international alliances and government efforts to urgently organize resources to make multiple vaccines on shortened timelines; Four vaccine candidates entered human evaluation in March.

On 24 June 2020, China approved the CanSino vaccine for limited use in the military and two inactivated virus vaccines for emergency use in high-risk occupations. On 11 August 2020, Russia announced the approval of its Sputnik V vaccine for emergency use, though one month later only small amounts of the vaccine had been distributed for use outside of the phase 3 trial.

The Pfizer–BioNTech partnership submitted an Emergency Use Authorization (EUA) request to the U.S. Food and Drug Administration (FDA) for their mRNA vaccine on 20 November 2020. On 2 December 2020, the United Kingdom's Medicines and Healthcare products Regulatory Agency (MHRA) gave temporary regulatory approval for the Pfizer–BioNTech vaccine, becoming the first country to approve the vaccine and the first country in the Western world to approve the use of any COVID‑19 vaccine. The US and the EU followed later that month. The US also granted an EUA for the Moderna COVID-19 vaccine in December. Bahrain and the United Arab Emirates granted emergency marketing authorization for the Sinopharm BIBP vaccine.

On 31 March 2021, the Russian government announced that they had registered the first COVID‑19 vaccine for animals. Named Carnivac-Cov, it is an inactivated vaccine for carnivorous animals, including pets, aimed at preventing mutations that occur during the interspecies transmission of SARS-CoV-2.

In October 2022, China began administering an oral vaccine developed by CanSino Biologics using its adenovirus model.

Despite the availability of mRNA and viral vector vaccines, worldwide vaccine equity has not been achieved. The ongoing development and use of whole inactivated virus (WIV) and protein-based vaccines has been recommended, especially for use in developing countries, to dampen further waves of the pandemic.

In June 2025, the European Medicines Agency announced that it was making data from the marketing authorization applications for COVID‑19 mRNA vaccines Comirnaty and Spikevax publicly available.

Multiple steps along the entire development path are evaluated, including:

- the level of acceptable toxicity of the vaccine (its safety),
- targeting vulnerable populations,
- the need for vaccine efficacy breakthroughs,
- the duration of vaccination protection,
- special delivery systems (such as oral or nasal, rather than by injection),
- dose regimen,
- stability and storage characteristics,
- emergency use authorization before formal licensing,
- optimal manufacturing for scaling to billions of doses, and
- dissemination of the licensed vaccine.

=== Challenges ===
There have been several unique challenges with COVID‑19 vaccine development.

Timelines for conducting clinical research usually a sequential process requiring years – were being compressed into safety, efficacy, and dosing trials running simultaneously over months. Under normal circumstances, large-scale trials involving thousands of participants only proceed after smaller studies confirm there are no significant safety concerns. For example, Chinese vaccine developers and the Chinese Center for Disease Control and Prevention began their efforts in January 2020, and by March they were pursuing numerous candidates on short timelines.

The rapid development and urgency of producing a vaccine for the COVID‑19 pandemic were expected to increase the risks and failure rate of delivering a safe, effective vaccine. Additionally, research at universities is obstructed by physical distancing and the closing of laboratories.

Vaccines must progress through several phases of clinical trials to test for safety, immunogenicity, effectiveness, dose levels, and adverse effects of the candidate vaccine. Vaccine developers have to invest resources internationally to find enough participants for Phase II–III clinical trials when the virus has proved to be a "moving target" of changing transmission rates across and within countries, forcing companies to compete for trial participants.

As new vaccines are developed during the COVID‑19 pandemic, licensure of COVID‑19 vaccine candidates requires submission of a full dossier of information on development and manufacturing quality.

=== Organizations involved in COVID-19 vaccine development ===
Internationally, the Access to COVID‑19 Tools Accelerator is a G20 and World Health Organization (WHO) initiative announced in April 2020. It is a cross-discipline support structure to enable partners to share resources and knowledge. It comprises four pillars, each managed by two to three collaborating partners: Vaccines (also called "COVAX"), Diagnostics, Therapeutics, and Health Systems Connector. The WHO's April 2020 "R&D Blueprint (for the) novel Coronavirus" documented a "large, international, multi-site, individually randomized controlled clinical trial" to allow "the concurrent evaluation of the benefits and risks of each promising candidate vaccine within 3–6 months of it being made available for the trial." The WHO vaccine coalition will prioritize which vaccines should go into Phase II and III clinical trials and determine harmonized Phase III protocols for all vaccines achieving the pivotal trial stage.

National governments have also been involved in vaccine development. Canada announced funding for 96 projects for the development and production of vaccines at Canadian companies and universities, with plans to establish a "vaccine bank" that could be used if another coronavirus outbreak occurs, support clinical trials, and develop manufacturing and supply chains for vaccines.

China provided low-rate loans to one vaccine developer through its central bank and "quickly made land available for the company" to build production plants. Three Chinese vaccine companies and research institutes are supported by the government for financing research, conducting clinical trials, and manufacturing.

The United Kingdom government formed a COVID‑19 vaccine task force in April 2020 to stimulate local efforts for accelerated development of a vaccine through collaborations between industries, universities, and government agencies. The UK's Vaccine Taskforce contributed to every phase of development, from research to manufacturing.

In the United States, the Biomedical Advanced Research and Development Authority (BARDA), a federal agency funding disease-fighting technology, announced investments to support American COVID‑19 vaccine development and the manufacturing of the most promising candidates. In May 2020, the government announced funding for a fast-track program called Operation Warp Speed. By March 2021, BARDA had funded an estimated $19.3 billion in COVID‑19 vaccine development.

Large pharmaceutical companies with experience in making vaccines at scale, including Johnson & Johnson, AstraZeneca, and GlaxoSmithKline (GSK), formed alliances with biotechnology companies, governments, and universities to accelerate progress toward effective vaccines.

== Effectiveness ==
Death rates from COVID-19 for unvaccinated Americans substantially exceeded those who were vaccinated, with bivalent boosters further reducing the death rate.

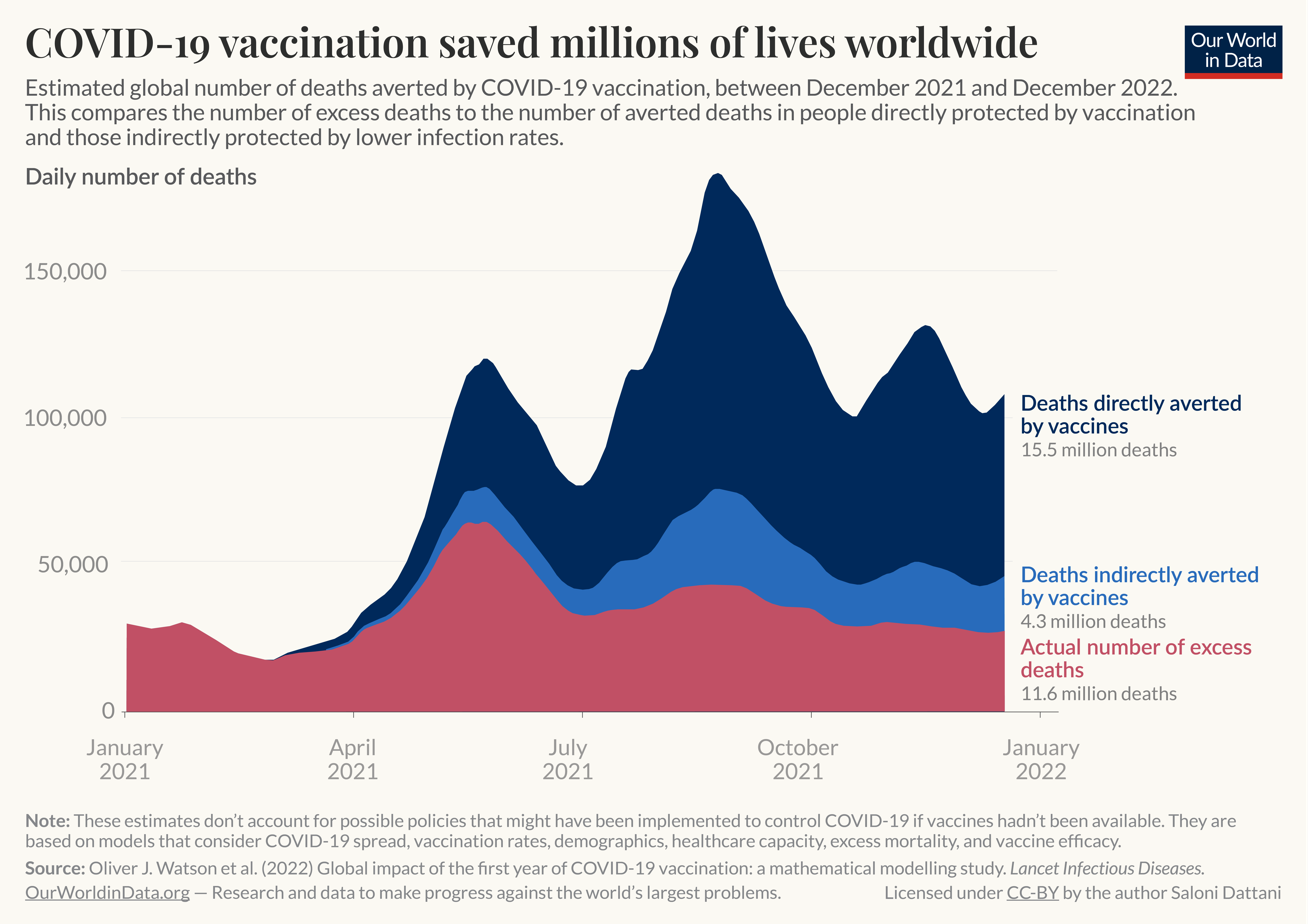
Researchers have estimated that COVID-19 vaccines saved around 20 million lives globally in the first year of vaccine availability.

Evidence from vaccine use during the pandemic shows vaccination can reduce infection and is most effective at preventing severe COVID-19 symptoms and death, but is less good at preventing mild COVID-19. Efficacy wanes over time but can be maintained with boosters. In 2021, the CDC reported that unvaccinated people were 10 times more likely to be hospitalized and 11 times more likely to die than fully vaccinated people.

The CDC reported that vaccine effectiveness fell from 91% against Alpha to 66% against Delta. One expert stated that "those who are infected following vaccination are still not getting sick and not dying like was happening before vaccination." By late August 2021, the Delta variant accounted for 99 percent of U.S. cases and was found to double the risk of severe illness and hospitalization for those not yet vaccinated.

On 10 December 2021, the UK Health Security Agency reported that early data indicated a 20- to 40-fold reduction in neutralizing activity for Omicron by sera from Pfizer 2-dose vaccinees relative to earlier strains. After a booster dose (usually with an mRNA vaccine), vaccine effectiveness against symptomatic disease was at 70%–75%, and the effectiveness against severe disease was expected to be higher.

A meta-analysis looking into COVID-19 vaccine differences in immunosuppressed individuals found that people with a weakened immune system are less able to produce neutralizing antibodies. For example, organ transplant recipients need three vaccines to achieve seroconversion. A study on the serologic response to mRNA vaccines among patients with lymphoma, leukemia, and myeloma found that one-quarter of patients did not produce measurable antibodies, varying by cancer type.

In February 2023, a systematic review in The Lancet said that the protection afforded by infection was comparable to that from vaccination, albeit with an increased risk of severe illness and death from the disease of an initial infection.

A January 2024 study by the CDC found that staying up to date on the vaccines could reduce the risk of strokes, blood clots and heart attacks related to COVID-19 in people aged 65 years or older or with a condition that makes them more vulnerable to said conditions.

=== Against infection and transmission ===
Transmission is mostly due to mild infections. Vaccines show lower effectiveness against mild infections than severe infections, and the effectivenss decreases within six months of vaccination. Vaccine efficacy against infections was around 77% for pre-Omicron variants in the first months after vaccination, and 26% against Omicron variants. The efficacy against infections waned more rapidly than against severe illness. Boosters restored the protection against infections.

==== Duration of immunity ====
As of 2021, available evidence shows that fully vaccinated individuals and those previously infected with SARS-CoV-2 have a low risk of subsequent infection for at least six months. There is insufficient data to determine an antibody titer threshold that indicates when an individual is protected from infection. Multiple studies show that antibody titers are associated with protection at the population level, but individual protection titers remain unknown. For some populations, such as the elderly and the immunocompromised, protection levels may be reduced after both vaccination and infection. Available evidence indicates that the level of protection may not be the same for all variants of the virus.

As of December 2021, there are no FDA-authorized or approved tests that providers or the public can use to determine if a person is protected from infection reliably.

As of March 2022, elderly residents' protection against severe illness, hospitalization, and death in English care homes was high immediately after vaccination, but protection declined significantly in the months following vaccination. Protection among care home staff, who were younger, declined much more slowly. Regular boosters are recommended for older people, and boosters for care home residents every six months appear reasonable.

The US Centers for Disease Control and Prevention (CDC) recommends a fourth dose of the Pfizer mRNA vaccine as of March 2022 for "certain immunocompromised individuals and people over the age of 50".

=== Against severe illness and death ===
Overall, vaccines had a 87%–90% protection against severe outcomes, such as hospitalisation. Six months after vaccination, the protection was still 76%. Like with infections, the protection was stronger against pre-Omicron variants than Omicron. Protection against dying from COVID was similar: around 86%.

According to a June 2022 study, COVID‑19 vaccines prevented an additional 14.4 to 19.8 million deaths in 185 countries and territories from 8 December 2020 to 8 December 2021. A 2024 study estimated around 1.6 million lives saves in the wider European region. A study published in 2025 estimated that COVID-19 vaccinations globally averted approximately 2.5 million deaths between 2020 and 2024, with the majority of the benefit concentrated among older adults. These estimates were more conservative than those reported in previous studies, using different estimates of vaccine effectiveness and mortality rates.

=== Immune evasion by variants ===
In contrast to other investigated prior variants, the SARS-CoV-2 Omicron variant and its BA.4/5 subvariants have evaded immunity induced by vaccines, which may lead to breakthrough infections despite recent vaccination. Nevertheless, vaccines are thought to provide protection against severe illness, hospitalizations, and deaths due to Omicron.

==== Vaccine adjustments ====
In June 2022, Pfizer and Moderna developed bivalent vaccines to protect against the SARS-CoV-2 wild-type and the Omicron variant. The bivalent vaccines are well-tolerated and offer immunity to Omicron superior to previous mRNA vaccines. In September 2022, the United States Food and Drug Administration (FDA) authorized the bivalent vaccines.

In June 2023, the FDA advised manufacturers that the 2023–2024 formulation of the COVID‑19 vaccines for use in the US be updated to be a monovalent COVID‑19 vaccine using the XBB.1.5 lineage of the Omicron variant. In June 2024, the FDA advised manufacturers that the 2024–2025 formulation of the COVID‑19 vaccines for use in the US be updated to be a monovalent COVID‑19 vaccine using the JN.1 lineage.

In October 2024, the Committee for Medicinal Products for Human Use of the European Medicines Agency (EMA) gave a positive opinion to update the composition of Bimervax, a vaccine targeting the Omicron XBB.1.16 subvariant.

In May 2025, the World Health Organization (WHO) recommended that monovalent JN.1 or KP.2 vaccines remain appropriate vaccine antigens and that monovalent LP.8.1 is a suitable alternative vaccine antigen. The EMA recommends updating COVID-19 vaccines to target LP.8.1 for the 2025/2026 vaccination campaign.

In May 2026, the WHO advised vaccine manufacturers that monovalent LP.8.1 (Nextstrain: 25A; GenBank: PV074550.1; GISAID: EPI_ISL_19467828) is the recommended COVID-19 vaccine antigen. Other antigens (e.g. XFG, NB.1.8.1) or other approaches that demonstrate broad and robust neutralizing antibody responses or efficacy against currently circulating SARS-CoV-2 variants could also be used.

In May 2026, the US FDA advised manufacturers that the COVID-19 vaccines (2026-2027 Formula) for use in the United States beginning in fall 2026 should be a monovalent JN.1 lineage XFG variant vaccine.

In May 2026, the EMA suggested that targeting XFG would provide the best protection against COVID-19 caused by JN.1 omicron subvariants, and also against BA.3.2. Vaccines targeting the LP.8.1 strain could still be considered for vaccination campaigns in 2026.

=== Against long COVID ===
COVID-19 vaccination seems to reduce risk of long COVID. Three doses of a COVID-19 vaccine may reduce the risk by 70%, while two doses give 43% protection and one dose gives 19% protection. The evidence is based on observational studies, rather than on randomized clinical trials. The large randomized control trials on COVID-19 vaccines did not include long COVID as an outcome measure.

An analysis involving more than 20 million adults found that vaccinated people had a lower risk of long COVID compared with those who had not received a COVID‑19 vaccine; they were also protected against blood clots and heart failure after the COVID infection.

=== Mix and match ===
According to studies, the combination of two different COVID‑19 vaccines, also called heterologous vaccination, cross-vaccination, or the mix-and-match method, provides protection equivalent to that of mRNA vaccines, including protection against the Delta variant. Individuals who receive the combination of two different vaccines produce strong immune responses, with side effects no worse than those caused by standard regimens.

== Adverse effects ==
The risks of serious illness from COVID-19 are far higher than the risk posed by the vaccines. For most people, the side effects, also called adverse effects, from COVID‑19 vaccines are mild and can be managed at home. The adverse effects of the COVID‑19 vaccination are similar to those of other vaccines, and severe adverse effects are rare. Adverse effects from the vaccine are higher than placebo, but placebo arms of vaccine trials still reported adverse effects that can be attributed to the nocebo effect.

A February 2022 study, which examined a potential causal link between COVID-19 vaccines and excess deaths, found that out of more than 250 million Americans vaccinated, only 55 cases of death after COVID-19 vaccination were reported and in 17 of these, a causal relationship had been excluded. The Paul Ehrlich Institute has recorded 31 cerebral venous sinus thromboses (CVST) and nine deaths out of 2.7 million vaccinated in Germany with the AZD1222. The UK Medicines and Healthcare products Regulatory Agency (MHRA) recorded 73 deaths out of nearly 50 million doses of AstraZeneca given in UK.

All vaccines administered via intramuscular injection, including COVID‑19 vaccines, have side effects related to the mild trauma associated with the procedure and the introduction of a foreign substance into the body. These include soreness, redness, rash, and inflammation at the injection site. Other common side effects include fatigue, headache, myalgia (muscle pain), and arthralgia (joint pain), all of which generally resolve without medical treatment within a few days. These common side effects result from the body responding to the vaccine to build up protection from the virus.

Like any other vaccine, some people are allergic to one or more ingredients in COVID‑19 vaccines. Typical side effects are stronger and more common in younger people and in subsequent doses, and up to 20% of people report a disruptive level of side effects after the second dose of an mRNA vaccine. These side effects are less common or weaker in inactivated vaccines. COVID‑19 vaccination-related enlargement of lymph nodes happens in 11.6% of those who received one dose of the vaccine and in 16% of those who received two doses.

COVID‑19 vaccination is safe for breastfeeding people. Temporary changes to the menstrual cycle in young women have been reported. However, these changes are "small compared with natural variation and quickly reverse." In one study, women who received both doses of a two-dose vaccine during the same menstrual cycle (an atypical situation) may see their next period begin a couple of days late. They have about twice the usual risk of a clinically significant delay (about 10% of these women, compared to about 4% of unvaccinated women). Cycle lengths return to normal after two menstrual cycles post-vaccination. Women who received doses in separate cycles had approximately the same natural variation in cycle lengths as unvaccinated women. Other temporary menstrual effects have been reported, such as heavier than normal menstrual bleeding after vaccination.

=== Serious adverse events ===
Serious adverse events associated COVID‑19 vaccines are generally rare but of high interest to the public. The official databases of reported adverse events include:

- the World Health Organization's VigiBase;
- the United States Vaccine Adverse Events Reporting System (VAERS);
- the United Kingdom's Yellow Card Scheme;
- the European Medicines Agency's EudraVigilance system, which operates a regular transfer of data on suspected adverse drug reactions occurring in the EU to WHO's Uppsala Monitoring Centre.

Increased public awareness of these reporting systems and the extra reporting requirements under US FDA Emergency Use Authorization rules have increased reported adverse events. Serious side effects are an ongoing area of study, and resources have been allocated to try to better understand them. Research currently indicates that the rate and type of side effects are lower-risk than infection. For example, although vaccination may trigger some side effects, the effects experienced from an infection could be worse. Neurological side effects from getting COVID‑19 are hundreds of times more likely than from vaccination. Evidence suggests that vaccination confers no significantly increased risk of serious adverse effects, including various cardiovascular, metabolic, and endocrine events, based on a cohort study involving 1 million adults in Denmark who have received an mRNA COVID-19 booster shot targeting the Omicron JN.1 variant.

Documented rare serious effects include:

- anaphylaxis, a severe type of allergic reaction. Anaphylaxis affects one person per 250,000 to 400,000 doses administered. The rate is in line with the expected rate of anaphylaxis to non-COVID vaccines. According to a 2022 systematic review, the mortality rate of people with anaphylaxis following COVID‐19 vaccination was 0.5%. The review concluded the consensus of the studies was that "the risk of anaphylaxis is not significant when compared to the risks posed by COVID‐19 infection".
- blood clots (thrombosis). These vaccine-induced immune thrombocytopenia and thrombosis are associated with vaccines using an adenovirus system (Janssen and Oxford-AstraZeneca). These affect about one person per 100,000. There is a far higher risk of developing blood clots as a result of COVID-19 infection than from the vaccines.
- myocarditis and pericarditis, or inflammation of the heart. There is a rare risk of myocarditis (inflammation of the heart muscle) or pericarditis (inflammation of the membrane covering the heart) after the mRNA COVID‑19 vaccines (Moderna or Pfizer-BioNTech). The risk of myocarditis after COVID‑19 vaccination is estimated to be 0.3 to 5 cases per 100,000 persons, with the highest risk in young males. COVID‑19 vaccines may protect against myocarditis due to subsequent COVID‑19 infection. The risk of myocarditis and pericarditis is significantly higher (up to 11 times higher with respect to myocarditis) after COVID‑19 infection as compared to COVID‑19 vaccination, with the possible exception of men under 40 who may have a higher risk of myocarditis after the second Moderna mRNA vaccine (an additional 97 cases of myocarditis per 1 million persons vaccinated). The mortality rate from myocarditis post-vaccination is extremely low. According to a 2022 study, of patients diagnosed with myocarditis (in both vaccination and COVID-19 cohorts), 1.07% were hospitalized and 0.015% died. As of June 2025, the US FDA requires a prescription label warning regarding myocarditis and pericarditis.
- thrombotic thrombocytopenia and other autoimmune diseases, which have been reported as adverse events after the COVID‑19 vaccine.
- new onset tinnitus after the first dose of certain vaccines; however, there is a higher risk of the same symptom developing after influenza and pneumococcal vaccinations than after the COVID-19 vaccine.

== Distribution and access ==
=== Distribution ===
Note about the table in this section: number and percentage of people who have received at least one dose of a COVID‑19 vaccine (unless noted otherwise). May include vaccination of non-citizens, which can push totals beyond 100% of the local population. The table is updated daily by a bot. (Note: The table data is automatically updated daily by a bot; see Template:COVID-19 data for more information. Scroll down past the table to find the documentation and the main reference. See also: Category:Automatically updated COVID-19 pandemic table templates.)

Updated November 5, 2026. (Note: The table data is automatically updated by a bot; see Template:COVID-19 data for more information. See also: Category:Automatically updated COVID-19 pandemic table templates.)

COVID-19 vaccine distribution by country
	Location	Vaccinated (Note: Number of people who have received at least one dose of a COVID-19 vaccine (unless noted otherwise).)	Percent (Note: Percentage of population that has received at least one dose of a COVID-19 vaccine. May include vaccination of non-citizens, which can push totals beyond 100% of the local population.)
	World (Note: Countries which do not report data for a column are not included in that column's world total.) (Note: Vaccination note: Countries which do not report the number of people who have received at least one dose are not included in the world total.)	5,645,247,500	70.71%
(China)	China (Note: Does not include special administrative regions (Hong Kong and Macau) or Taiwan.)	1,318,026,800	92.48%
(India)	India	1,027,438,900	72.08%
(European Union)	European Union (Note: Data on member states of the European Union are individually listed, but are also summed here for convenience. They are not double-counted in world totals.)	338,481,060	75.43%
(United States)	United States (Note: Vaccination note: Includes Freely Associated States)	270,227,170	79.12%
(Indonesia)	Indonesia	204,419,400	73.31%
(Brazil)	Brazil	189,643,420	90.17%
(Pakistan)	Pakistan	165,567,890	67.94%
(Bangladesh)	Bangladesh	151,507,170	89.45%
(Japan)	Japan	104,740,060	83.79%
(Mexico)	Mexico	97,179,496	75.56%
(Nigeria)	Nigeria	93,829,430	42.05%
(Vietnam)	Vietnam	90,497,670	90.79%
(Russia)	Russia	89,081,600	61.19%
(Philippines)	Philippines	82,684,776	72.55%
(Iran)	Iran	65,199,830	72.83%
(Germany)	Germany	64,876,300	77.15%
(Turkey)	Turkey	57,941,052	66.55%
(Thailand)	Thailand	57,005,496	79.47%
(Egypt)	Egypt	56,907,320	50.53%
(France)	France	54,677,680	82.50%
(United Kingdom)	United Kingdom	53,806,964	78.92%
(Ethiopia)	Ethiopia	52,489,510	41.86%
(Italy)	Italy (Note: Vaccination note: Includes Vatican City)	50,936,720	85.44%
(South Korea)	South Korea	44,764,956	86.45%
(Colombia)	Colombia	43,012,176	83.13%
(Myanmar)	Myanmar	41,551,930	77.30%
(Argentina)	Argentina	41,529,056	91.46%
(Spain)	Spain	41,351,230	86.46%
(Canada)	Canada	34,742,936	89.49%
(Tanzania)	Tanzania	34,434,932	53.21%
(Peru)	Peru	30,563,708	91.30%
(Malaysia)	Malaysia	28,138,564	81.10%
(Nepal)	Nepal	27,883,196	93.83%
(Saudi Arabia)	Saudi Arabia	27,041,364	84.04%
(Morocco)	Morocco	25,020,168	67.03%
(South Africa)	South Africa	24,210,952	38.81%
(Poland)	Poland	22,984,544	59.88%
(Mozambique)	Mozambique	22,869,646	70.03%
(Australia)	Australia	22,231,734	84.85%
(Venezuela)	Venezuela	22,157,232	78.54%
(Uzbekistan)	Uzbekistan	22,094,470	63.24%
(Taiwan)	Taiwan	21,899,240	93.51%
(Uganda)	Uganda	20,033,188	42.34%
(Afghanistan)	Afghanistan	19,151,368	47.20%
(Chile)	Chile	18,088,516	92.51%
(Sri Lanka)	Sri Lanka	17,143,760	75.08%
(Democratic Republic of the Congo)	Democratic Republic of the Congo	17,045,720	16.65%
(Angola)	Angola	16,550,642	46.44%
(Ukraine)	Ukraine	16,267,198	39.63%
(Ecuador)	Ecuador	15,345,791	86.10%
(Cambodia)	Cambodia	15,316,670	89.04%
(Sudan)	Sudan	15,207,452	30.79%
(Kenya)	Kenya	14,494,372	26.72%
(Ghana)	Ghana	13,864,186	41.82%
(Ivory Coast)	Ivory Coast	13,568,372	44.64%
(Netherlands)	Netherlands	12,582,081	70.27%
(Zambia)	Zambia	11,711,565	58.11%
(Iraq)	Iraq	11,332,925	25.72%
(Rwanda)	Rwanda	10,884,714	79.74%
(Kazakhstan)	Kazakhstan	10,858,101	54.20%
(Cuba)	Cuba	10,805,570	97.70%
(United Arab Emirates)	United Arab Emirates	9,991,089	97.55%
(Portugal)	Portugal	9,821,414	94.28%
(Belgium)	Belgium	9,261,641	79.55%
(Somalia)	Somalia	8,972,167	50.40%
(Guatemala)	Guatemala	8,937,923	50.08%
(Tunisia)	Tunisia	8,896,848	73.41%
(Guinea)	Guinea	8,715,641	62.01%
(Greece)	Greece	7,938,031	76.24%
(Algeria)	Algeria	7,840,131	17.24%
(Sweden)	Sweden	7,775,726	74.14%
(Zimbabwe)	Zimbabwe	7,525,882	46.83%
(Dominican Republic)	Dominican Republic	7,367,193	65.60%
(Bolivia)	Bolivia	7,361,008	60.95%
(Israel)	Israel	7,055,466	77.51%
(Czech Republic)	Czech Republic	6,982,006	65.42%
(Hong Kong)	Hong Kong	6,920,057	92.69%
(Austria)	Austria	6,899,873	76.12%
(Honduras)	Honduras	6,596,213	63.04%
(Belarus)	Belarus	6,536,392	71.25%
(Hungary)	Hungary	6,420,354	66.30%
(Nicaragua)	Nicaragua	6,404,524	95.15%
(Niger)	Niger	6,248,483	24.69%
(Switzerland)	Switzerland	6,096,911	69.34%
(Burkina Faso)	Burkina Faso	6,089,089	27.05%
(Laos)	Laos	5,888,649	77.90%
(Sierra Leone)	Sierra Leone	5,676,123	68.58%
(Romania)	Romania	5,474,507	28.56%
(Malawi)	Malawi	5,433,538	26.42%
(Azerbaijan)	Azerbaijan	5,373,253	52.19%
(Tajikistan)	Tajikistan	5,328,277	52.33%
(Singapore)	Singapore	5,287,005	93.58%
(Chad)	Chad	5,147,667	27.89%
(Jordan)	Jordan	4,821,579	42.83%
(Denmark)	Denmark	4,746,522	80.41%
(El Salvador)	El Salvador	4,659,970	74.20%
(Costa Rica)	Costa Rica	4,650,636	91.52%
(Turkmenistan)	Turkmenistan	4,614,869	63.83%
(Finland)	Finland	4,524,288	81.24%
(Mali)	Mali	4,354,292	18.87%
(Norway)	Norway	4,346,995	79.66%
(South Sudan)	South Sudan	4,315,127	39.15%
(New Zealand)	New Zealand	4,302,330	83.84%
(Republic of Ireland)	Republic of Ireland	4,112,237	80.47%
(Paraguay)	Paraguay	3,995,915	59.11%
(Liberia)	Liberia	3,903,802	72.65%
(Cameroon)	Cameroon	3,753,733	13.58%
(Panama)	Panama	3,746,041	85.12%
(Benin)	Benin	3,697,190	26.87%
(Kuwait)	Kuwait	3,457,498	75.33%
(Serbia)	Serbia	3,354,075	49.39%
(Syria)	Syria	3,295,630	14.67%
(Oman)	Oman	3,279,632	69.33%
(Uruguay)	Uruguay	3,010,464	88.78%
(Qatar)	Qatar	2,852,178	98.61%
(Slovakia)	Slovakia	2,840,017	51.89%
(Lebanon)	Lebanon	2,740,227	47.70%
(Madagascar)	Madagascar	2,710,365	8.90%
(Senegal)	Senegal	2,684,696	15.21%
(Central African Republic)	Central African Republic	2,600,389	51.01%
(Croatia)	Croatia	2,323,025	59.46%
(Libya)	Libya	2,316,327	32.07%
(Mongolia)	Mongolia	2,284,018	67.45%
(Togo)	Togo	2,255,579	27.95%
(Bulgaria)	Bulgaria	2,155,863	31.58%
(Mauritania)	Mauritania	2,103,754	43.15%
(Palestine)	Palestine	2,012,767	37.94%
(Lithuania)	Lithuania	1,958,299	69.52%
(Botswana)	Botswana	1,951,054	79.96%
(Kyrgyzstan)	Kyrgyzstan	1,736,541	24.97%
(Georgia (country))	Georgia	1,654,504	43.60%
(Albania)	Albania	1,349,255	47.72%
(Latvia)	Latvia	1,346,184	71.57%
(Slovenia)	Slovenia	1,265,802	59.84%
(Bahrain)	Bahrain	1,241,174	80.94%
(Armenia)	Armenia	1,150,915	39.95%
(Mauritius)	Mauritius	1,123,773	88.06%
(Moldova)	Moldova	1,109,524	36.50%
(Yemen)	Yemen	1,050,202	2.75%
(Lesotho)	Lesotho	1,014,073	44.36%
(Bosnia and Herzegovina)	Bosnia and Herzegovina	943,394	29.44%
(Kosovo)	Kosovo	906,858	52.79%
(Timor-Leste)	Timor-Leste	886,838	64.77%
(Estonia)	Estonia	870,202	64.45%
(Jamaica)	Jamaica	859,773	30.28%
(North Macedonia)	North Macedonia	854,570	46.44%
(Trinidad and Tobago)	Trinidad and Tobago	754,399	50.43%
(Guinea-Bissau)	Guinea-Bissau	747,057	35.48%
(Fiji)	Fiji	712,025	77.44%
(Bhutan)	Bhutan	699,116	89.52%
(Republic of the Congo)	Republic of the Congo	695,760	11.53%
(Macau)	Macau	679,703	96.50%
(The Gambia)	Gambia	674,314	25.58%
(Cyprus)	Cyprus	671,193	71.37%
(Namibia)	Namibia	629,767	21.79%
(Eswatini)	Eswatini	526,050	43.16%
(Haiti)	Haiti	521,396	4.53%
(Guyana)	Guyana	497,550	60.56%
(Luxembourg)	Luxembourg	481,957	73.77%
(Malta)	Malta	478,953	90.68%
(Brunei)	Brunei	451,149	99.07%
(Comoros)	Comoros	438,825	52.60%
(Djibouti)	Djibouti	421,573	37.07%
(Maldives)	Maldives	399,308	76.19%
(Papua New Guinea)	Papua New Guinea	382,020	3.74%
(Cape Verde)	Cabo Verde	356,734	68.64%
(Solomon Islands)	Solomon Islands	343,821	44.02%
(Gabon)	Gabon	311,244	12.80%
(Iceland)	Iceland	309,770	81.44%
(Northern Cyprus)	Northern Cyprus	301,673	78.80%
(Montenegro)	Montenegro	292,783	47.63%
(Equatorial Guinea)	Equatorial Guinea	270,109	14.98%
(Suriname)	Suriname	267,820	42.98%
(Belize)	Belize	258,473	64.18%
(New Caledonia)	New Caledonia	192,375	67.00%
(Samoa)	Samoa	191,403	88.91%
(French Polynesia)	French Polynesia	190,908	68.09%
(Vanuatu)	Vanuatu	176,624	56.42%
(The Bahamas)	Bahamas	174,810	43.97%
(Barbados)	Barbados	163,853	58.04%
(São Tomé and Príncipe)	Sao Tome and Principe	140,256	61.97%
(Curaçao)	Curaçao	108,601	58.59%
(Kiribati)	Kiribati	100,900	77.33%
(Aruba)	Aruba	90,546	84.00%
(Seychelles)	Seychelles	88,520	70.52%
(Tonga)	Tonga	87,375	83.17%
(Jersey)	Jersey	84,365	81.52%
(Isle of Man)	Isle of Man	69,560	82.66%
(Antigua and Barbuda)	Antigua and Barbuda	64,290	69.24%
(Cayman Islands)	Cayman Islands	62,113	86.74%
(Saint Lucia)	Saint Lucia	60,140	33.64%
(Andorra)	Andorra	57,913	72.64%
(Guernsey)	Guernsey	54,223	85.06%
(Bermuda)	Bermuda	48,554	74.96%
(Grenada)	Grenada	44,241	37.84%
(Gibraltar)	Gibraltar	42,175	112.08%
(Faroe Islands)	Faroe Islands	41,715	77.19%
(Greenland)	Greenland	41,227	73.60%
(Saint Vincent and the Grenadines)	Saint Vincent and the Grenadines	37,532	36.77%
(Burundi)	Burundi	36,909	0.28%
(Saint Kitts and Nevis)	Saint Kitts and Nevis	33,794	72.31%
(Dominica)	Dominica	32,995	49.36%
(Turks and Caicos Islands)	Turks and Caicos Islands	32,815	71.54%
(Sint Maarten)	Sint Maarten	29,788	70.65%
(Monaco)	Monaco	28,875	74.13%
(Liechtenstein)	Liechtenstein	26,771	68.05%
(San Marino)	San Marino	26,357	77.26%
(British Virgin Islands)	British Virgin Islands	19,466	50.76%
(Caribbean Netherlands)	Caribbean Netherlands	19,109	66.69%
(Cook Islands)	Cook Islands	15,112	102.48%
(Nauru)	Nauru	13,106	110.86%
(Anguilla)	Anguilla	10,858	76.45%
(Tuvalu)	Tuvalu	9,763	97.51%
(Wallis and Futuna)	Wallis and Futuna	7,150	62.17%
(Saint Helena, Ascension and Tristan da Cunha)	Saint Helena, Ascension and Tristan da Cunha	4,361	81.23%
(Falkland Islands)	Falkland Islands	2,632	74.88%
(Tokelau)	Tokelau	2,203	95.29%
(Montserrat)	Montserrat	2,104	47.01%
(Niue)	Niue	1,638	88.83%
(Pitcairn Islands)	Pitcairn Islands	47	100.00%
(North Korea)	North Korea	0	0.00%

As of 12 August 2024, 13.53 billion COVID-19 vaccine doses have been administered worldwide, with 70.6 percent of the global population having received at least one dose. While 4.19 million vaccines were then being administered daily, only 22.3 percent of people in low-income countries had received at least a first vaccine by September 2022, according to official reports from national health agencies, which are collated by Our World in Data.

During a pandemic on the rapid timeline and scale of COVID-19 cases in 2020, international organizations like the World Health Organization (WHO) and Coalition for Epidemic Preparedness Innovations (CEPI), vaccine developers, governments, and industry evaluated the distribution of the eventual vaccine(s). Individual countries producing a vaccine may be persuaded to favor the highest bidder for manufacturing or provide first-class service to their own country. Experts emphasize that licensed vaccines should be available and affordable for people at the frontlines of healthcare and in most need.

In April 2020, it was reported that the UK agreed to work with 20 other countries and global organizations, including France, Germany, and Italy, to find a vaccine and share the results, and that UK citizens would not get preferential access to any new COVID‑19 vaccines developed by taxpayer-funded UK universities. Several companies planned to initially manufacture a vaccine at artificially low prices, then increase prices for profitability later if annual vaccinations are needed and as countries build stock for future needs.

The WHO had set out the target to vaccinate 40% of the population of all countries by the end of 2021 and 70% by mid-2022, but many countries missed the 40% target at the end of 2021.

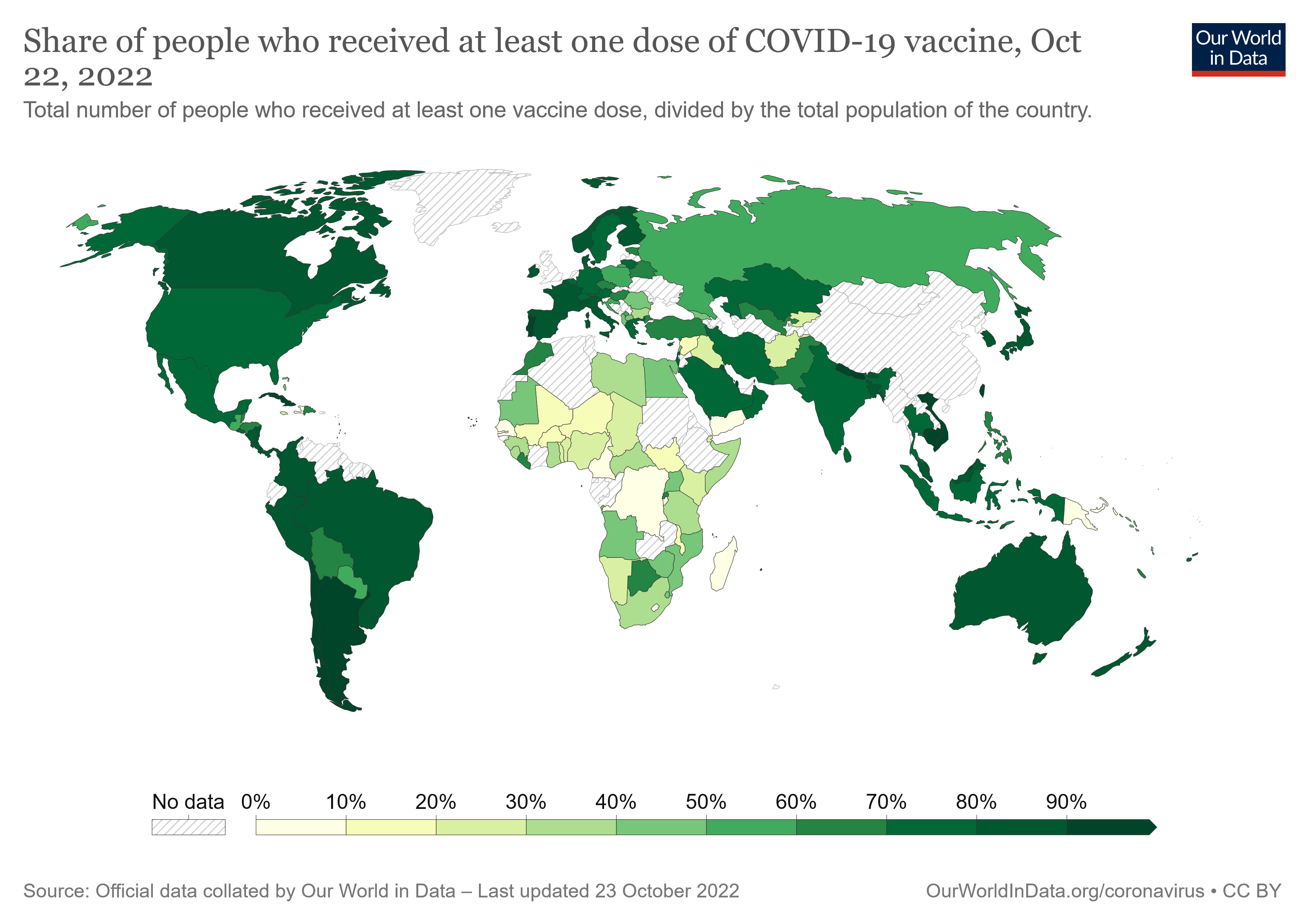
Share of people who have received at least one dose of a COVID-19 vaccine relative to a country's total population. The date is on the map. Commons source.

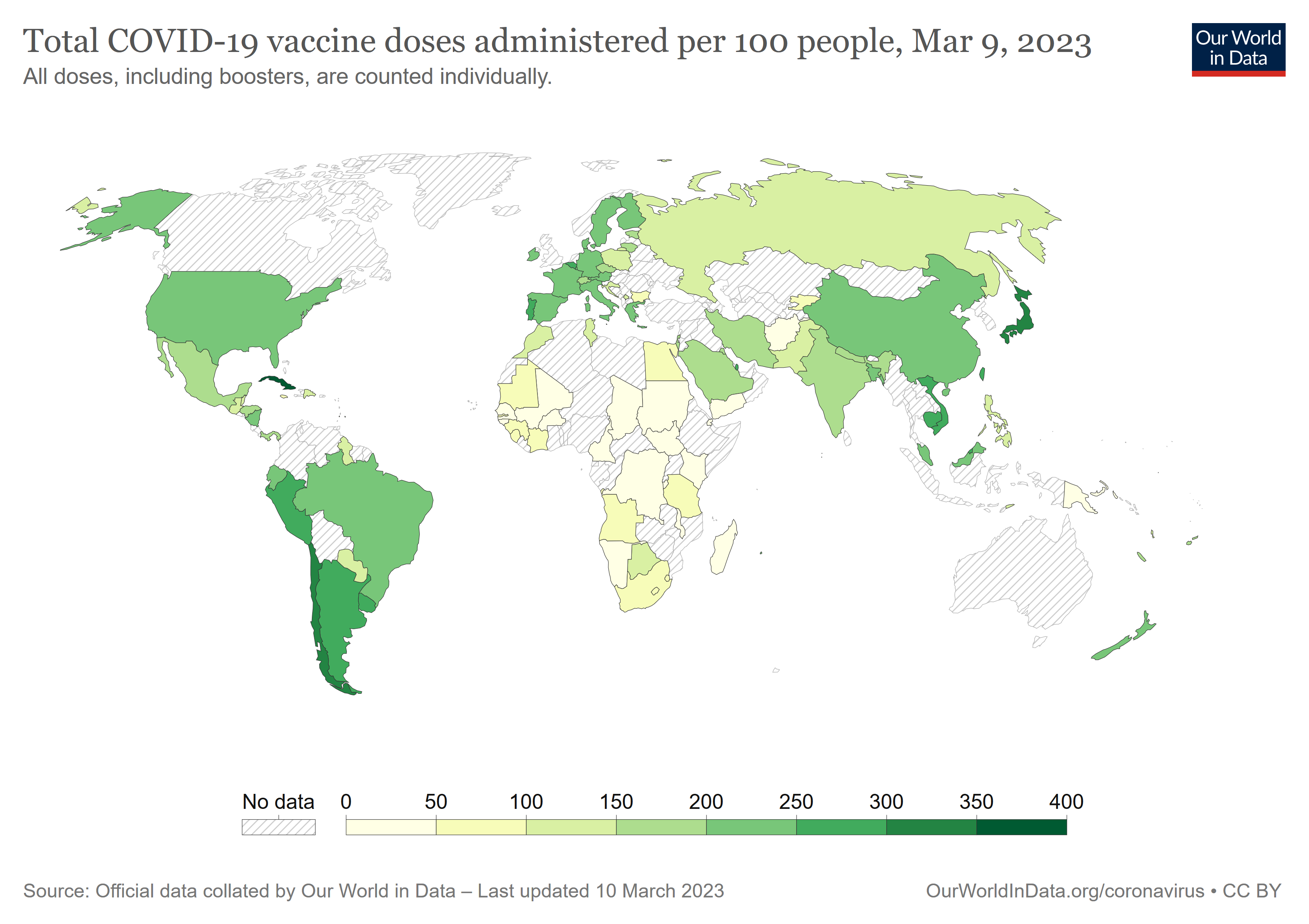
COVID-19 vaccine doses administered per 100 people by country. The date is on the map. Commons source.

=== Access during the pandemic ===
Countries have extremely unequal access to the COVID‑19 vaccine. Vaccine equity has not been achieved or even approximated. The inequity has harmed both countries with poor access and countries with good access.

Nations pledged to buy doses of the COVID‑19 vaccines before the doses were available. Though high-income nations represent only 14% of the global population, as of 15 November 2020, they had contracted to buy 51% of all pre-sold doses. Some high-income nations bought more doses than would be necessary to vaccinate their entire populations.

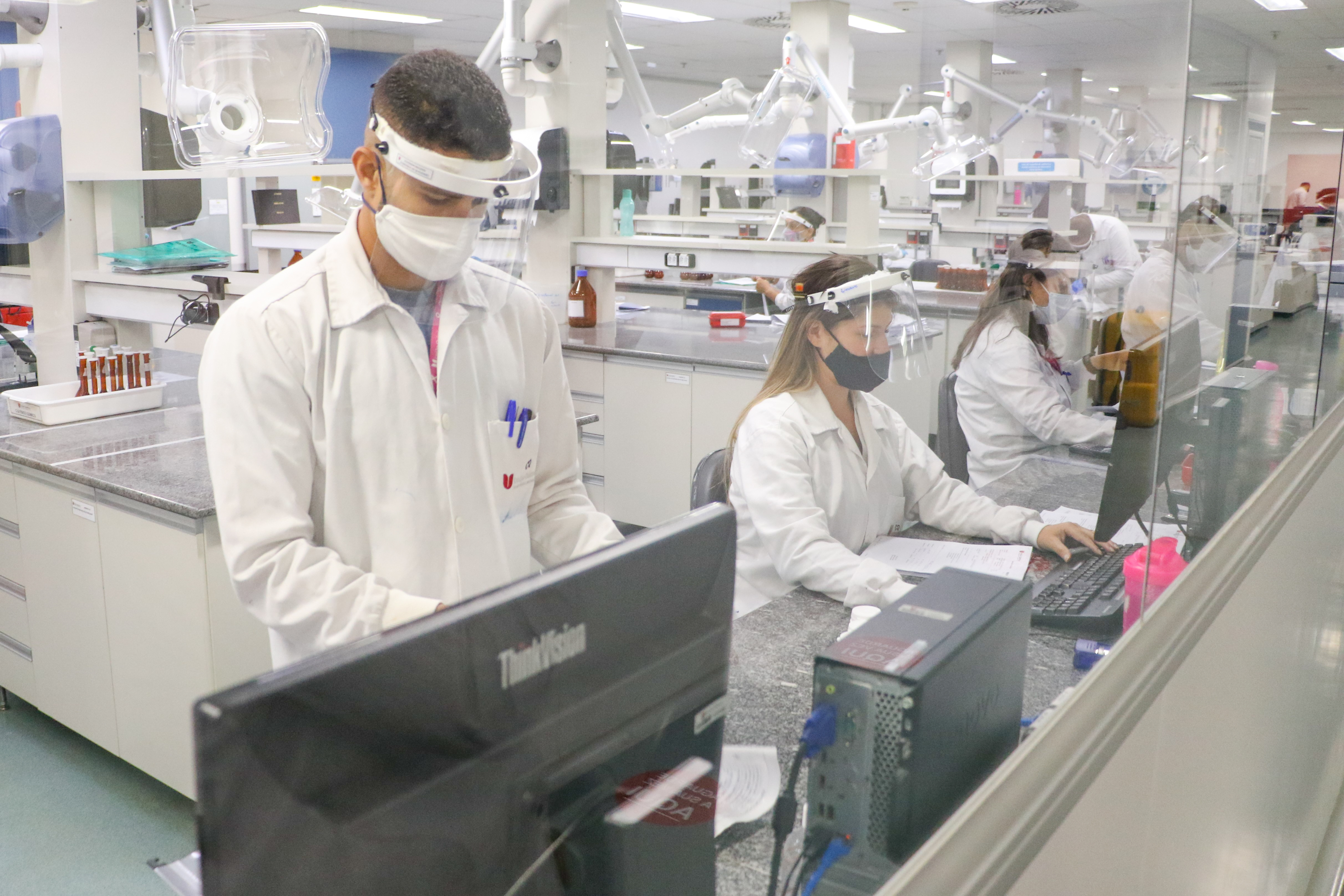
Production of the Sputnik V vaccine in Brazil, January 2021

In January 2021, WHO Director-General Tedros Adhanom Ghebreyesus warned of problems with equitable distribution: "More than 39 million doses of vaccine have now been administered in at least 49 higher-income countries. Just 25 doses have been given in one lowest-income country. Not 25 million; not 25 thousand; just 25."

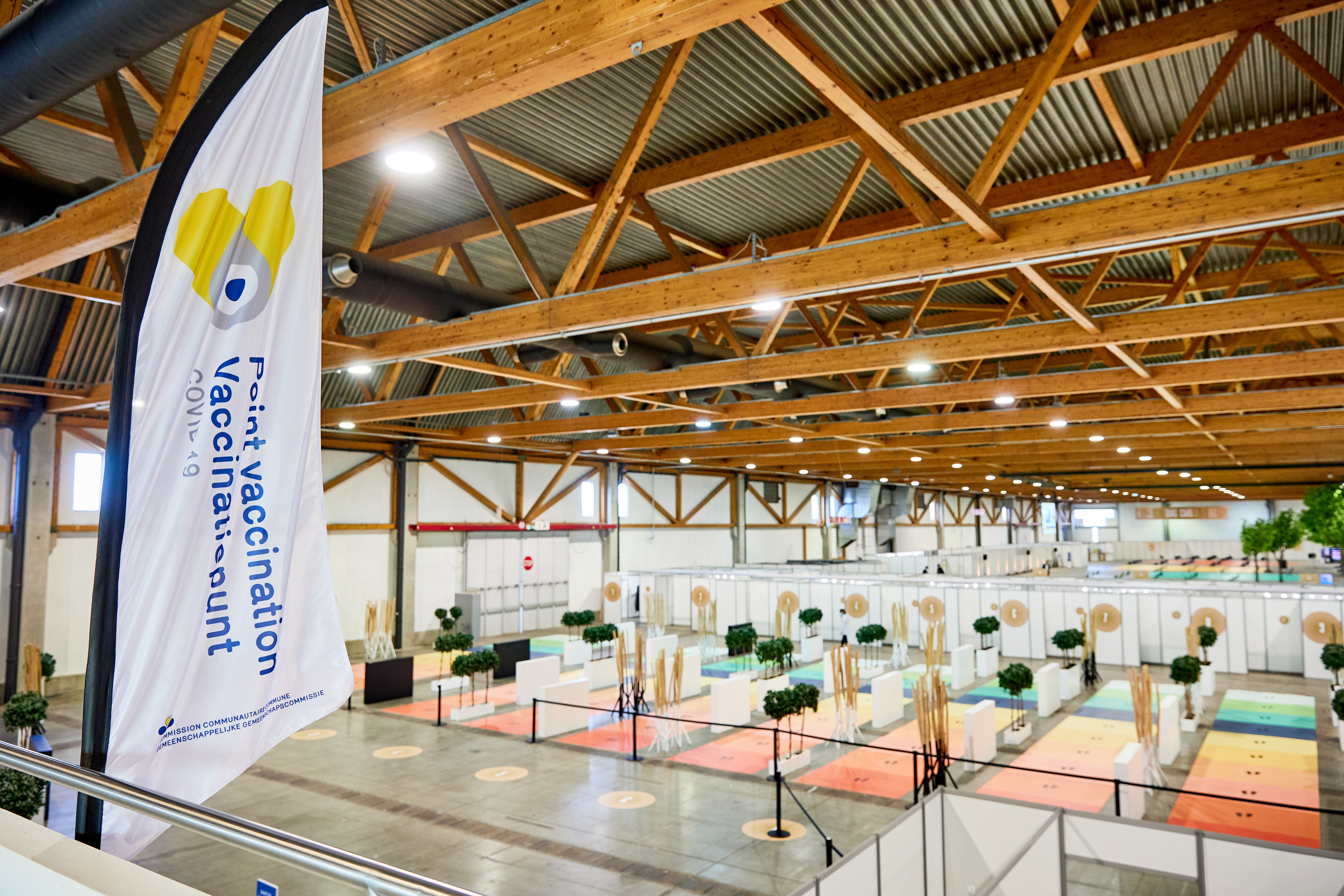
Inside of a vaccination center in Brussels, Belgium, February 2021

In March 2021, it was revealed that the US attempted to convince Brazil not to purchase the Sputnik V COVID‑19 vaccine, fearing "Russian influence" in Latin America. Some nations involved in long-standing territorial disputes have reportedly had their access to vaccines blocked by competing nations; Palestine has accused Israel of blocking vaccine delivery to Gaza, while Taiwan has suggested that China has hampered its efforts to procure vaccine doses.

A single dose of the COVID‑19 vaccines by AstraZeneca would cost 47 Egyptian pounds (EGP), and the authorities are selling them for between 100 and 200 EGP. A report by the Carnegie Endowment for International Peace cited the poverty rate in Egypt as around 29.7 percent, which constitutes approximately 30.5 million people, and claimed that about 15 million Egyptians would be unable to gain access to the luxury of vaccination. A human rights lawyer, Khaled Ali, launched a lawsuit against the government, forcing them to provide vaccinations free of charge to all members of the public.

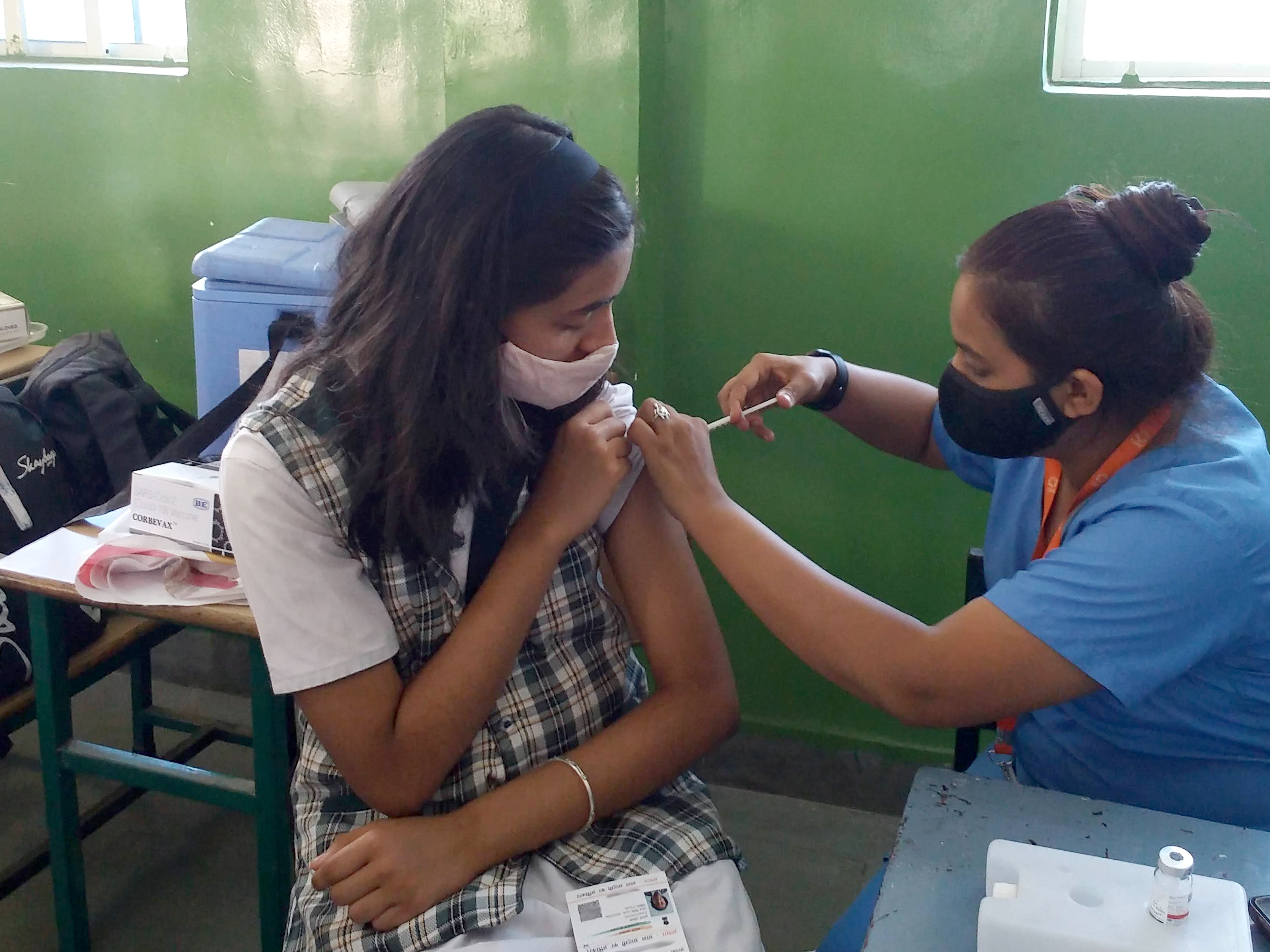
COVID‑19 vaccination for children aged 12–14 in Bhopal, India

According to immunologist Anthony Fauci, mutant strains of the virus and limited vaccine distribution pose continuing risks, and he said, "we have to get the entire world vaccinated, not just our own country." Edward Bergmark and Arick Wierson are calling for a global vaccination effort and wrote that the wealthier nations' "me-first" mentality could ultimately backfire because the spread of the virus in poorer countries would lead to more variants, against which the vaccines could be less effective.

In March 2021, the United States, Britain, European Union member states, and some other members of the World Trade Organization (WTO) blocked a push by more than eighty developing countries to waive COVID‑19 vaccine patent rights in an effort to boost production of vaccines for poor nations. On 5 May 2021, the US government under President Joe Biden announced that it supports waiving intellectual property protections for COVID‑19 vaccines. The Members of the European Parliament have backed a motion demanding the temporary lifting of intellectual property rights for COVID‑19 vaccines.

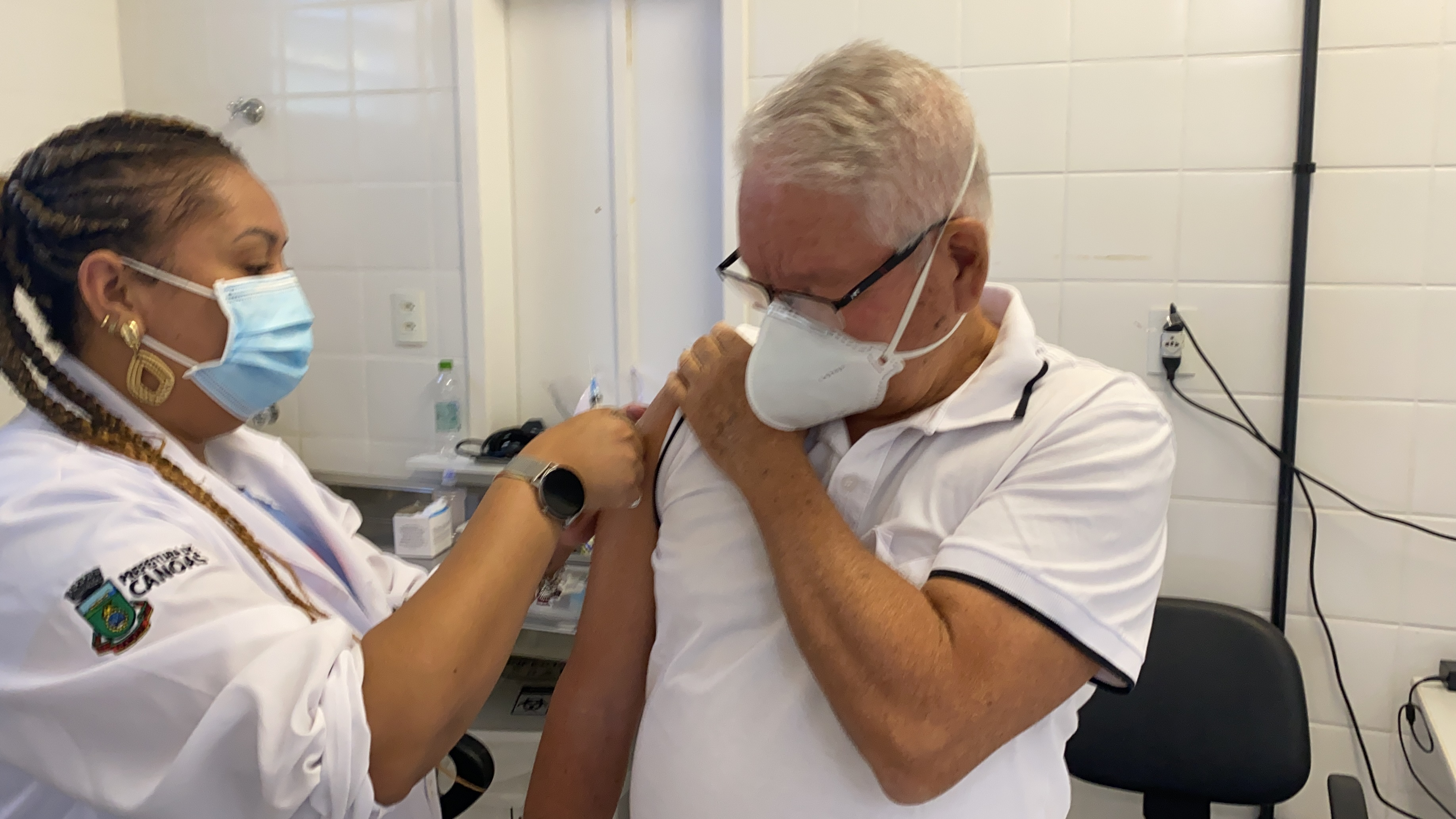
An elderly man receiving a second dose of the CoronaVac vaccine in Brazil in April 2021

In a meeting in April 2021, the World Health Organization's emergency committee addressed concerns of persistent inequity in global vaccine distribution. Although 9 percent of the world's population lives in the 29 poorest countries, these countries had received only 0.3% of all vaccines administered as of May 2021. In March 2021, Brazilian journalism agency Agência Pública reported that the country vaccinated about twice as many people who declare themselves white than black and noted that mortality from COVID‑19 is higher in the black population.

In May 2021, UNICEF made an urgent appeal to industrialized nations to pool their excess COVID‑19 vaccine capacity to make up for a 125-million-dose gap in the COVAX program. The program mostly relied on the Oxford–AstraZeneca COVID‑19 vaccine produced by the Serum Institute of India, which faced serious supply problems due to increased domestic vaccine needs in India from March to June 2021. Only a limited amount of vaccines can be distributed efficiently, and the shortfall of vaccines in South America and parts of Asia is due to a lack of expedient donations by richer nations. International aid organizations have pointed at Nepal, Sri Lanka, and the Maldives, as well as Argentina, Brazil, and some parts of the Caribbean, as problem areas where vaccines are in short supply. In mid-May 2021, UNICEF was also critical of the fact that most proposed donations of Moderna and Pfizer vaccines were not slated for delivery until the second half of 2021 or early in 2022.

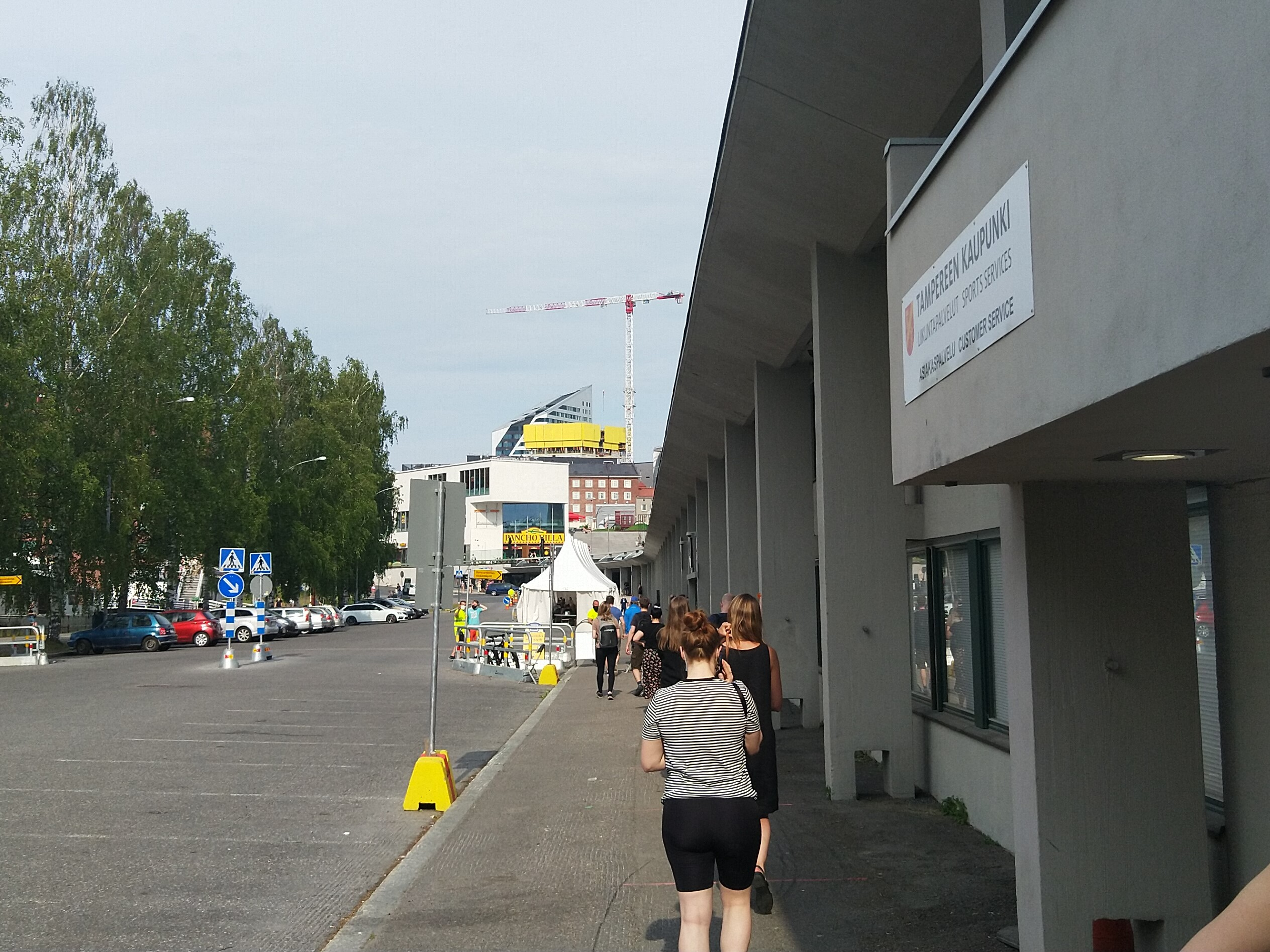
COVID‑19 mass vaccination queue in Finland, June 2021

In July 2021, the heads of the World Bank Group, the International Monetary Fund, the World Health Organization, and the World Trade Organization said in a joint statement: "As many countries are struggling with new variants and a third wave of COVID‑19 infections, accelerating access to vaccines becomes even more critical to ending the pandemic everywhere and achieving broad-based growth. We are deeply concerned about the limited vaccines, therapeutics, diagnostics, and support for deliveries available to developing countries." In July 2021, The BMJ reported that countries had thrown out over 250,000 vaccine doses as supply exceeded demand and strict laws prevented the sharing of vaccines. A survey by The New York Times found that over a million doses of vaccine had been thrown away in ten U.S. states because federal regulations prohibit recalling them, preventing their redistribution abroad. Furthermore, doses donated close to expiration often cannot be administered quickly enough by recipient countries and end up having to be discarded. To help overcome this problem, the Prime Minister of India, Narendra Modi, announced that they would make their digital vaccination management platform, CoWIN, open to the global community. He also announced that India would also release the source code for the contact tracing app Aarogya Setu for developers around the world. Around 142 countries, including Afghanistan, Bangladesh, Bhutan, the Maldives, Guyana, Antigua and Barbuda, St. Kitts and Nevis, and Zambia, expressed their interest in the application for COVID management.

Amnesty International and Oxfam International have criticized the support of vaccine monopolies by the governments of producing countries, noting that this is dramatically increasing the dose price by five times and often much more, creating an economic barrier to access for poor countries. Médecins Sans Frontières (Doctors without Borders) has also criticized vaccine monopolies and repeatedly called for their suspension, supporting the TRIPS waiver. The waiver was first proposed in October 2020 and has support from most countries, but was delayed by opposition from the EU (especially Germany; major EU countries such as France, Italy, and Spain support the exemption), the UK, Norway, and Switzerland, among others. MSF called for a Day of Action in September 2021 to put pressure on the WTO Minister's meeting in November, which was expected to discuss the TRIPS IP waiver.

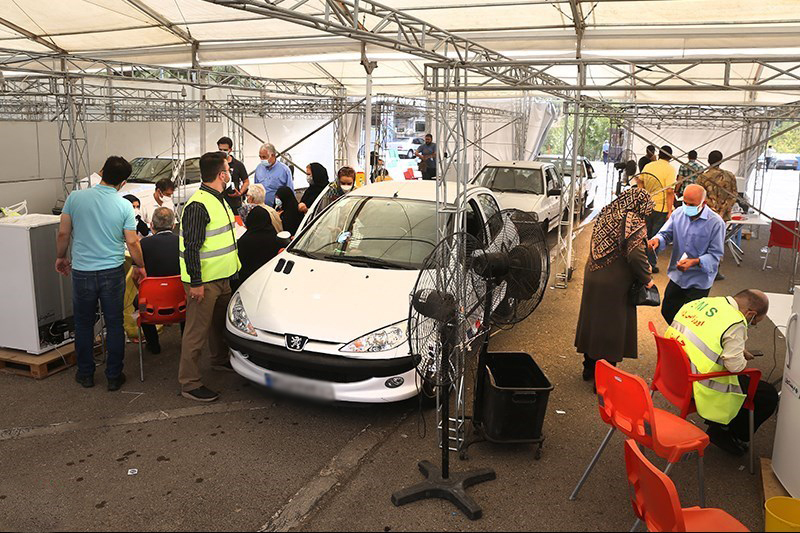
A drive-through COVID‑19 vaccination center in Iran, August 2021

In August 2021, to reduce unequal distribution between rich and poor countries, the WHO called for a moratorium on booster doses at least until the end of September. However, in August, the United States government announced plans to offer booster doses eight months after the initial course to the general population, starting with priority groups. Before the announcement, the WHO harshly criticized this type of decision, citing the lack of evidence for the need for boosters, except for patients with specific conditions. At this time, vaccine coverage of at least one dose was 58% in high-income countries and only 1.3% in low-income countries, and 1.14 million Americans had already received an unauthorized booster dose. US officials argued that waning efficacy against mild and moderate disease might indicate reduced protection against severe disease in the coming months. Israel, France, Germany, and the United Kingdom have also started planning boosters for specific groups. In September 2021, more than 140 former world leaders and Nobel laureates, including former President of France François Hollande, former Prime Minister of the United Kingdom Gordon Brown, former Prime Minister of New Zealand Helen Clark, and Professor Joseph Stiglitz, called on the candidates to be the next German chancellor to declare themselves in favor of waiving intellectual property rules for COVID‑19 vaccines and transferring vaccine technologies. In November 2021, nursing unions in 28 countries filed a formal appeal with the United Nations over the refusal of the UK, EU, Norway, Switzerland, and Singapore to temporarily waive patents for COVID‑19 vaccines.

During his first international trip, the President of Peru, Pedro Castillo, spoke at the seventy-sixth session of the United Nations General Assembly on 21 September 2021, proposing the creation of an international treaty signed by world leaders and pharmaceutical companies to guarantee universal vaccine access, arguing that "The battle against the pandemic has shown us the failure of the international community to cooperate under the principle of solidarity."

Optimizing the societal benefit of vaccination may benefit from a strategy that is tailored to the state of the pandemic, the demographics of a country, the age of the recipients, the availability of vaccines, and the individual risk for severe disease. In the UK, the interval between prime and booster doses was extended to vaccinate as many people as early as possible. Many countries are starting to give an additional booster shot to the immunosuppressed and the elderly, and research predicts an additional benefit of personalizing vaccine doses in the setting of limited vaccine availability when a wave of virus Variants of Concern hits a country.

Despite the extremely rapid development of effective mRNA and viral vector vaccines, vaccine equity has not been achieved. The World Health Organization called for 70 percent of the global population to be vaccinated by mid-2022, but as of March 2022, it was estimated that only one percent of the 10 billion doses given worldwide had been administered in low-income countries. An additional 6 billion vaccinations may be needed to fill vaccine access gaps, particularly in developing countries. Given the projected availability of newer vaccines, the development and use of whole inactivated virus (WIV) and protein-based vaccines are also recommended. Organizations such as the Developing Countries Vaccine Manufacturers Network could help to support the production of such vaccines in developing countries, with lower production costs and greater ease of deployment.

While vaccines substantially reduce the probability and severity of infection, it is still possible for fully vaccinated people to contract and spread COVID‑19. Public health agencies have recommended that vaccinated people continue using preventive measures (wear face masks, social distance, wash hands) to avoid infecting others, especially vulnerable people, particularly in areas with high community spread. Governments have indicated that such recommendations will be reduced as vaccination rates increase and community spread declines.

==== Economics ====
Moreover, an unequal distribution of vaccines will deepen inequality and exaggerate the gap between rich and poor and will reverse decades of hard-won progress on human development. — United Nations, COVID vaccines: Widening inequality and millions vulnerable

Vaccine inequity damages the global economy, disrupting the global supply chain. Most vaccines were reserved for wealthy countries; as of September 2021, some countries have more vaccines than are needed to fully vaccinate their populations. When people are under-vaccinated, needlessly die, experience disability, and live under lockdown restrictions, they cannot supply the same goods and services. This harms the economies of under-vaccinated and over-vaccinated countries alike. Since rich countries have larger economies, rich countries may lose more money to vaccine inequity than poor ones, though the poor ones will lose a higher percentage of GDP and experience longer-term effects. High-income countries would profit an estimated US$4.80 for every $1 spent on giving vaccines to lower-income countries.

The International Monetary Fund sees the vaccine divide between rich and poor nations as a serious obstacle to a global economic recovery. Vaccine inequity disproportionately affects refuge-providing states, as they tend to be poorer, and refugees and displaced people are economically more vulnerable even within those low-income states, so they have suffered more economically from vaccine inequity.

== Technology-assisted vaccine hunting ==
=== Background ===
During the initial phase of COVID-19 vaccine distribution in early 2021, demand for appointments in the United States significantly exceeded supply. Eligibility rules changed frequently, and vaccination providers—including pharmacies, hospitals, and state health departments—operated separate online scheduling systems. Appointment slots were often released unpredictably and filled within minutes.

In response, informal volunteer networks—commonly referred to as "vaccine hunters" or "vaccine angels"—emerged to help individuals locate available appointments. These groups coordinated through Facebook, Slack, Telegram, Discord, and Twitter, sharing scheduling strategies and real-time updates.

=== Regional automated tools ===
In several metropolitan areas, technologists developed automated programs to monitor vaccine scheduling systems.

In the San Francisco Bay Area, software engineer Mukesh Aggarwal created a program that reportedly scanned more than 100 vaccination provider websites and distributed alerts through a Telegram channel when appointments became available.

High school students in the Bay Area launched a Twitter bot known as @CovaxSF that scanned county and pharmacy websites and tweeted availability alerts.

Additional regional reporting described independently developed bots that monitored California's MyTurn platform and pharmacy portals, automatically posting updates when openings were detected.

Similar tools were reported in other states, including bots that tracked CVS, Walgreens, Rite Aid, and state health department portals and posted appointment alerts on Twitter.

=== Nationwide tracking projects ===
Beyond regional efforts, several nationwide tools and volunteer-run data projects emerged to aggregate appointment information.

Websites such as VaccinateCA compiled crowd-sourced reports of vaccine availability across California.

National media coverage also described developers who built multi-state tracking bots that scraped pharmacy APIs or scheduling endpoints and automatically posted updates to Twitter or Telegram channels.

Some programmers published open-source scripts that allowed others to monitor appointment endpoints directly, contributing to a broader ecosystem of decentralized vaccine tracking tools.

=== Public response and policy concerns ===
Media outlets characterized these automated systems as grassroots technological responses to fragmented vaccine distribution systems. However, coverage also noted concerns that automated monitoring tools could advantage individuals with technical knowledge, fast internet access, or the ability to respond immediately to alerts.

Some pharmacy chains and state systems reportedly implemented countermeasures to limit automated scraping, including rate limits and CAPTCHA systems.

As vaccine supply increased and eligibility expanded nationwide in mid-2021, the need for intensive appointment monitoring declined, and many volunteer-run bots and tracking systems were discontinued.

=== Liability ===
Several governments agreed to shield pharmaceutical companies like Pfizer and Moderna from negligence claims related to COVID‑19 vaccines (and treatments), as in previous pandemics, when governments also took on liability for such claims.

In the US, these liability shields took effect in February 2020, when the US Secretary of Health and Human Services, Alex Azar, published a notice of declaration under the Public Readiness and Emergency Preparedness Act (PREP Act) for medical countermeasures against COVID‑19, covering "any vaccine, used to treat, diagnose, cure, prevent, or mitigate COVID‑19, or the transmission of SARS-CoV-2 or a virus mutating therefrom". The declaration precludes "liability claims alleging negligence by a manufacturer in creating a vaccine, or negligence by a health care provider in prescribing the wrong dose, absent willful misconduct." In other words, absent "willful misconduct", these companies cannot be sued for money damages for any injuries that occur between 2020 and 2024 from the administration of vaccines and treatments related to COVID‑19. The declaration is effective in the United States through 1 October 2024.

In December 2020, the UK government granted Pfizer legal indemnity for its COVID‑19 vaccine.

In the European Union, the COVID‑19 vaccines were granted a conditional marketing authorization, which does not exempt manufacturers from civil and administrative liability claims. The EU conditional marketing authorizations were changed to standard authorizations in September 2022. While the purchasing contracts with vaccine manufacturers remain secret, they do not contain liability exemptions, even for side effects not known at the time of licensure.

The Bureau of Investigative Journalism, a nonprofit news organization, reported in an investigation that unnamed officials in some countries, such as Argentina and Brazil, said that Pfizer demanded guarantees against costs of legal cases due to adverse effects in the form of liability waivers and sovereign assets such as federal bank reserves, embassy buildings, or military bases, going beyond what was expected from other countries, such as the US. During the pandemic parliamentary inquiry in Brazil, Pfizer's representative said that its terms for Brazil are the same as for all other countries with which it has signed deals.

In December 2022, the governor of Florida, Ron DeSantis, said that he would petition the state supreme court to convene a grand jury to investigate possible violations in respect to COVID‑19 vaccines, and declared that his government would be able to get "the data whether they [the companies] want to give it or not".

In November 2023, the US state of Texas sued Pfizer under section 17.47 of the Texas Deceptive Trade Practices Act, alleging that the company misled the public about its COVID-19 vaccine by hiding risks while making false claims about its effectiveness. In June 2024, the US state of Kansas similarly sued Pfizer under the Kansas Consumer Protection Act, making similar allegations.

== Public acceptance and hesitancy ==
After the December 2020 introduction of COVID vaccines, a partisan gap in death rates developed, indicating the effects of vaccine skepticism. As of March 2024, more than 30 percent of Republicans had not received a Covid vaccine, compared with less than 10 percent of Democrats.

A variety of unfounded conspiracy theories and other misinformation about COVID-19 vaccines have spread based on misunderstood or misrepresented science, religion, and law. These have included exaggerated claims about side effects, misrepresentations about how the immune system works and when and how COVID-19 vaccines are made, a story about COVID-19 being spread by 5G, and other false or distorted information. This misinformation, some created by anti-vaccination activists, has proliferated and may have made many people averse to vaccination.

Vaccine hesitancy has led to governments and private organizations around the world introducing measures to incentivize or coerce vaccination, such as lotteries, mandates, and free entry to events, which has in turn led to further misinformation about the legality and effect of these measures themselves. Critics of vaccine mandates have argued that such requirements infringe on individual medical choice and personal autonomy.

In the US, some prominent biomedical scientists who publicly advocate vaccination have been attacked and threatened in emails and on social media by anti-vaccination activists.

From 2020 to 2021, the United States Department of Defense (DoD) conducted the #ChinaAngVirus disinformation campaign in the Philippines, later expanded to Central Asia and the Middle East, which sought to discredit China, in particular its Sinovac vaccine, disseminating hashtags of #ChinaIsTheVirus and posts claiming that the Sinovac vaccine contained gelatin from pork and therefore was haram or forbidden for purposes of Islamic law.

== See also ==
- COVID‑19 drug development
- COVID‑19 drug repurposing research
