= Manuel Joaquim Henriques de Paiva =

Portuguese-Brazilian chemist and physician (1752–1829)

Manuel Joaquim Henriques de Paiva CvC
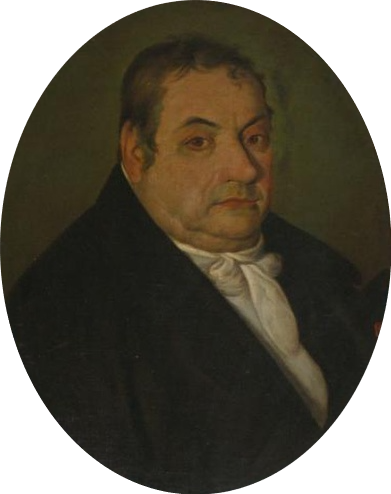
- Born: 23 December 1752; Castelo Branco, Portugal
- Died: 10 March 1829 (aged 76); Salvador, Bahia, Brazil
- Education: University of Coimbra
- Occupation: Physician
- Notable work: Preservativo das Bexigas (1801)

Manuel Joaquim Henriques de Paiva (Note: Also rendered as Manoel Joaquim Henriques de Paiva, as it was usually spelt before the spelling reforms of the 20th century.) (23 December 1752 – 10 March 1829) was a Portuguese Brazilian chemist and medical doctor, and an important science communicator. A prolific author, Henriques de Paiva published several dozens of scientific books, several of them translations or adaptations of works by international scientists such as Scopoli, Linnaeus, Brisson, or Fourcroy. He was responsible for the spread of Edward Jenner's work on heterologous vaccination throughout the Portuguese-speaking world, through his Preservativo das Bexigas ("Preservative Against the Pox", 1801), a book of popular science meant to raise public awareness to the benefits of vaccination against the deadly smallpox.

Henriques de Paiva was the youngest son of António Ribeiro de Paiva, a New Christian chemist, and was distantly related to António Nunes Ribeiro Sanches. During his youth, his family embarked to Colonial Brazil, where his father was the apothecary to the viceroy, the Marquis of Lavradio; it was here that he first trained as a chemist. After initially planning to study abroad, he enrolled at the University of Coimbra, showing great enthusiasm about the Pombaline reforms, and earned his degrees in Natural Philosophy in 1775 and in Medicine in 1781.

Henriques de Paiva held several important positions in the Portuguese sanitary administration (he was a physician of the Royal Household, a member of the Royal Board of the Protomedicate, a Professor at the University of Coimbra, a member of the Royal Academy of Sciences of Lisbon), and enjoyed some political protagonism. His links to the Freemasonry and to the French during the first invasion of Portugal in the Peninsular War would see him tried as a jacobin in 1809, banished to Brazil, and stripped of his offices and honours. He established himself in Salvador, Bahia; charges against him were dismissed in 1818, and his prerrogatives rehabilitated, which led to an appointment as a Professor at the Bahia Medical-Surgical School. Henriques de Paiva later intervened in support of the independence of Brazil.

== Distinctions ==
=== National orders ===
- Knight of the Order of Christ (forfeited in 1809; restored in 1818)
