= GamEvac-Combi =

Heterologous VSV- and Ad5-vectored Ebola vaccine

Vaccine description
- Target: Ebola
- Vaccine type: Heterologous

Legal status
- Legal status: Registered (Russia)

GamEvac-Combi (Russian: ГамЭвак-Комби) is a heterologous VSV- and Ad5-vectored Ebola vaccine. There is also a version called GamEvac which is a homologous Ad5-vectored vaccine. GamEvac-Combi was developed by Gamaleya Research Institute of Epidemiology and Microbiology. As of 2015 the vaccine has been licensed in Russia for emergency use, on the basis of Phase 1 and Phase 2 clinical trials.

== Description ==
The vaccine consists of live-attenuated recombinant vesicular stomatitis virus (VSV) and adenovirus serotype-5 (Ad5) expressing Ebola envelope glycoprotein. The vaccine is targeted against the Makona variant of Ebola that was circulating in West Africa during the 2013-2016 outbreak.

== History ==
GamEvac-Combi was licensed by the Ministry of Health of the Russian Federation for emergency use in the territory of the Russian Federation in December 2015. The emergency license was based on Phase I and II clinical data of safety and immunogenicity.

== See also ==
- Gam-COVID-Vac
