= VBI-2902 =

Vaccine candidate against COVID-19

Vaccine description
- Target: SARS-CoV-2
- Vaccine type: Virus-like particles

Clinical data
- Other names: VBI-2902a
- Routes of administration: Intramuscular

Identifiers
- CAS Number: 2695526-51-1

N VBI-2902 is a COVID-19 vaccine candidate developed by Variation Biotechnologies from the United States.

== History ==
In early 2020, in collaboration with NRC the VBI's vaccine—VBI-2900—was developed. According to the company, they have two vaccine candidates—"enveloped virus-like particle (eVLP)". VBI-2901 is a "trivalent pan-coronavirus vaccine expressing the SARS-CoV-2, SARS-CoV, and MERS-CoV spike proteins". VBI-2902 is a "monovalent COVID-19-specific vaccine expressing the SARS-CoV-2 spike protein". By March 9, the initial Phase 1/2 study of VBI-2902 was underway. VBI received CA$56 million from the federal government towards the COVID-19 vaccine development.
