= DelNS1-2019-nCoV-RBD-OPT =

Vaccine against COVID-19

Vaccine description
- Target: SARS-CoV-2
- Vaccine type: Viral vector

Clinical data
- Trade names: Pneucolin
- Other names: DelNS1-nCoV-RBD LAIV
- Routes of administration: Intranasal

Identifiers
- CAS Number: 2696350–29-3

DelNS1-2019-nCoV-RBD-OPT is a COVID-19 vaccine developed by Beijing Wantai Biological, Xiamen University and the University of Hong Kong. It is administered as a single dose intranasal spray.

On 14 December 2022, the vaccine was listed by the National Health Commission of China as a secondary booster dose option for people who have completed their third doses of inactivated COVID-19 vaccines for 6 months or longer.
