= Carnivac-Cov =

Inactivated COVID-19 vaccine for carnivores

Carnivac-Cov or Karnivak-Kov is the first veterinary vaccine against COVID-19. It is an inactivated vaccine for carnivores such as dogs, cats, foxes, arctic foxes and mink. It was developed by the Federal Service for Veterinary and Phytosanitary Supervision of Russia to help prevent mutations in animals that can occur in cross-species transmission, as is suspected to have occurred with the Cluster 5 variant in Denmark in November 2020.

The vaccine is given in 2 doses 21 days apart. In trials, the tested animals sustained an immune response for at least six months. The full course costs 500 ₽ (US$7).

Clinical trials on animals began in October 2020. The vaccine was registered in Russia on 31 March 2021, where production began on 30 April and administration began on 26 May.
