= Heterologous vaccine =

Vaccine using different types for priming and boosting

A homologous booster shot involves the administration of the same vaccine as previously administered, while a heterologous booster shot involves the administration of a different vaccine.

"Heterologous prime-boost immunization is administration of two different vectors or delivery systems expressing the same or overlapping antigenic inserts."

"An effective vaccine usually requires more than one time immunization in the form of prime-boost. Traditionally the same vaccines are given multiple times as homologous boosts. New findings suggested that prime-boost can be done with different types of vaccines containing the same antigens. In many cases such heterologous prime-boost can be more immunogenic than homologous prime-boost."
