= Vaccine equity =

Public health strategy

Vaccine equity is when every individual has a fair and just opportunity to be vaccinated, regardless of socioeconomic status, race, ethnicity, geographic location, or other determinants of health. Barriers to vaccine equity include decisions on which vaccines are developed, affordability of vaccination, production, allocation, logistics of deployment, and effective communications to impacted populations.

== Establishing and Defining Vaccine Equity ==
Vaccine equity means ensuring that everyone in the world has equal access to vaccines. The importance of vaccine equity has been emphasized by researchers and public health experts during the COVID-19 pandemic but is relevant to other illnesses and vaccines as well. Historically, world-wide immunization campaigns have led to the eradication of smallpox and significantly reduced polio, measles, tuberculosis, diphtheria, whooping cough, and tetanus.

Establishing global vaccine equity is imperative to mitigate the spread of global pandemics. There are multiple factors that contribute to the emergence and spread of pandemics, including the ability of people to travel long distances and therefore widely transmit viruses. A virus that remains in circulation in one location is likely to spread and recur in other areas. As a virus becomes more widespread and affects larger and more diverse populations, it is more likely it is to evolve to be increasingly transmissible, virulent, and vaccine resistant. Vaccine equity is essential to stop both the spread and the evolution of a disease. Ensuring that all populations receive access to vaccines is a pragmatic means towards achieving global public health. Failing to do so increases the likelihood of further occurrences of a disease.

Infectious diseases are disproportionately likely to affect those in low and middle-income neighborhoods and countries (LMICs), making vaccine equity an issue for local and national public health and for foreign policy. Ethically and morally, access for all to essential medicines such as vaccines is fundamentally related to the human right to health, which is well-founded in international law. Economically, vaccine inequity damages the global economy. Supply chains cross borders: areas with very high vaccination rates still depend on areas with lower vaccination rates for goods and services.

Achieving vaccine equity requires addressing inequalities and roadblocks in the production, trade, and health care delivery of vaccines. Challenges include scaling-up of technology transfer and production, costs of production, safety profiles of vaccines, and anti-vaccine disinformation and aggression.

Barriers to vaccine equity also involve consistent misinformation and lack of clear language within attempts to educate general populations on vaccine benefits and vaccines themselves, especially in rural areas and populations.

== Patterns of vaccine inequality ==
The wealthy generally have better access to vaccines than the poor, both between and within countries. Within countries, there may be lower rates of vaccination in racial and ethnic minority groups, in older adults, in families headed by vaccine skeptics, and among those living with disabilities or chronic conditions. The distribution and accessibility of vaccines show significant disparities between urban and rural areas especially in low- and middle-income countries. Some countries have programs to redress this inequality. Political, economic, social, and diplomatic factors can limit vaccine availability in some countries.

== Factors ==
Achieving control of a disease (such as COVID-19) requires more than just developing and licensing vaccines. It also involves producing them at scale, pricing them so they are globally affordable, allocating them where and when needed, and deploying them to local communities. An effective global approach to achieving vaccine equity must address challenges in the dimensions of vaccine production, allocation, affordability, and deployment.

Doctors Without Borders (MSF) lists five major obstacles to vaccine equity, taking into account that many of those to be vaccinated are children:

- Vaccine prices; new vaccines are on-patent and expensive (affordability)
- Getting vaccines to children; this is expensive and gets even more difficult in conflict zones and natural disasters (affordability, deployment)
- Five clinic visits in the first year of life is often too many; for people in remote areas with many children, it can be much more costly and difficult to get to a clinic. (deployment)
- Keeping vaccines cold; see cold chain. (deployment)
- Age-out; children who don't get vaccinated on-schedule often have to pay for their shots. Disruption from natural disasters or conflict can mean that entire generations go unprotected.(affordability, deployment)

Achieving vaccine equity depends on having a sufficient supply of affordable vaccines available for global use. Ideally, a vaccine that is suitable for global use will be based on established technology; will have multiple available suppliers of the materials and equipment needed for production; be appropriate to the regions where it is to be produced or deployed, in terms of scalability of production and storage conditions; and be supported by local infrastructure for its production, delivery and regulation.

=== Vaccine development ===
Developing a new drug and gaining regulatory approval is a long and expensive process that involves multiple stakeholders. The time required to develop a new drug can range from 10 to 15 years or longer. The average cost of developing at least one successful epidemic infectious disease vaccine from preclinical to the launch phase, taking into account the cost of failed attempts, has been estimated at from 18.1 million to 1 billion in USD.

Decisions about what drugs to develop often reflect the priorities of the companies and countries where drug development occurs. As of 2021, the United States had launched the highest number of new drugs and had the largest expenditure overall on pharmaceutical discovery, accounting for approximately 40% of the research done globally. The United States is also the country with the highest profits for pharmaceutical companies, and the highest drug costs for patients.

Emerging and reemerging viruses substantially affect people in low and middle income countries (LMICs), a pattern that may increase due to climate change. Pharmaceutical companies may have limited financial incentives to develop treatments for neglected tropical diseases in poor countries.

International organizations such as the World Health Organization, Unicef and the Developing Countries Vaccine Manufacturers Network support development of treatments for diseases such as West Nile virus, dengue fever; Chikungunya, Middle East respiratory syndrome (MERS), severe acute respiratory syndrome (SARS), Ebola, enterovirus D68 and Zika virus.

=== Vaccine affordability ===
A major factor in the economics of vaccines is intellectual property (IP) law. IP systems typically grant pharmaceutical companies temporary exclusive rights, which can allow for limited competition over a period of years. Economic models of monopoly pricing suggest that firms may adopt value-based pricing strategies, setting prices based on what the market will bear rather than on production costs. This can result in prices that are unaffordable to some populations compared to cost-plus pricing, which is based on production costs plus a markup.

Price discrimination refers to the practice of charging different prices to different consumers based on their willingness or ability to pay. In some cases, this can lead to higher prices overall compared to those in a fully-competitive market. Critics argue that such pricing strategies may limit access to vaccines in lower-income populations, although companies may state that differential pricing allows for broader distribution across markets.

Organizations such as Amnesty International, Oxfam International, and Médecins Sans Frontières (MSF; Doctors without Borders) have criticized government support of certain pharmaceutical monopolies, on the grounds that they can contribute to higher prices and reduced access to vaccines. During the COVID-19 pandemic, some countries and organizations called for COVID-related IP to be suspended, using the TRIPS Waiver. The waiver had support from many countries but was opposed by others, including members of the European Union (notably Germany), as well as the United Kingdom, Norway, and Switzerland, among others.

=== Vaccine production ===
Low and middle income countries tend to lack technological expertise and manufacturing capacity for the production of drugs and medical products. This leaves them dependent on diagnostics, treatments and vaccines from manufacturers in other countries and on availability in the global market. There are some exceptions such as China, Cuba, and India, which are actively producing pharmaceuticals to internationally accepted standards.

The COVID-19 pandemic has led to recommendations to diversify pharmaceutical production between countries and increase the productive ability of LMICs. These actions could allow an environment within those countries to better ensure that their own production needs are being met, which would then aid in achieving global vaccine equity. For example, the African Union Commission and Africa Centres for Disease Control and Prevention have called on countries and organizations to enable the production of at least 60% of the total vaccine doses required on the continent by 2040.

However, potential problems with the diversification of vaccine production can involve:

- Availability of capital, technology, and skills
- Adherence to quality standards
- Inconsistent or unsupportive national and international policy frameworks
- Size of markets, purchasing power, and variable demand for vaccines
- Lack of national or local infrastructure (e.g. reliable energy, electricity, transportation)

Even when organizations are willing to share their information, knowledge transfer can create serious delays for the production of vaccines. This may be particularly true in the case of novel technologies. LMICs may be better situated to produce vaccines that are based on more established technologies, if those are available.

=== Vaccine allocation ===
In the absence of well-organized systems to develop and distribute vaccines, vaccine companies and high income nations may monopolize available resources. Organizations such as GAVI, the Coalition for Epidemic Preparedness Innovations, and the World Health Organization have proposed multilateral initiatives such as Covax for the improvement of vaccine allocation. The intention with Covax was to collectively pool resources to ensure vaccine development and production. The resulting vaccine supplies could be fairly distributed to reach less wealthy countries and achieve vaccine equity. Foreign aid and resources from richer countries would cover the cost of distributing doses to lower-middle and low income countries.

As an allocation mechanism, Covax has succeeded in distributing COVID-19 vaccines, beginning with a shipment to Ghana on 24 February 2021. In the next year Covax delivered 1.2 billion vaccines to 144 countries. Covax was not able to acquire doses directly from manufacturers at the levels it had hoped. An estimated that 60% of the doses it distributed in 2021 (543 million out of 910 million) were donated doses from wealthy countries, beginning with the USA (41% of all donated doses).

Covax is an unprecedented initiative, but it has not met the goal of achieving vaccine equity. Higher income nations bypassed the proposed mechanism and negotiated directly with vaccine manufacturers, leaving Covax without the resources it needed to buy and distribute vaccines in a timely fashion. Smaller and poorer countries had to wait or negotiate for themselves, with varying success. Middle income countries with finances to cover the cost of vaccines still had considerable difficulty in obtaining them.

Ideally a global vaccine hub could have been developed by the international community before it was needed, rather than under the pressures of a pandemic. Improving it is important in preparation for future health crises. Analyses of Covax' institutional design and governance structures suggest that it lacked leverage to influence the behavior of donor states and pharmaceutical companies. It has been suggested that initiatives for vaccine allocation and vaccine equity could be improved by increasing the simplicity, transparency and accountability of their mechanisms. Others argue that such a body needs high-level leadership that is able to act at political and diplomatic levels to address issues of vaccine diplomacy as well as streamlining its mechanisms.

The allocation of vaccines and the issue of wastage are related. When high income countries buy more than they use, doses go to waste. If higher income countries donate near-expiration doses to lower income countries, those doses may expire before they can be effectively reallocated and used. This type of closed vial wastage could be reduced, through the improvement of supply chain management within countries, the internationally coordinated monitoring and tracking of vaccines, and well-organized systems for the timely donation and reallocation of surplus vaccines.

Open vial wastage, which occurs when only part of a vial of vaccine is used, could also be reduced. Strategies include making less doses available in a single vial, and organizing appointments to more effectively ensure that doses are used by overbooking (since some people will not appear) or not booking (so that only those who do appear receive doses).

=== Vaccine deployment ===
Barriers to vaccine deployment may be both logistical and psychological. In addition to supply and demand, barriers to immunization can include system barriers related to the organization of the health care system, health care provider barriers related to the availability and education of health care staff, and patient barriers related to a parent's or patient's fears or beliefs about immunization.

Cheap vaccines are often not administered due to insufficient infrastructure funding. Logistical difficulties are an obstacle to achieving global vaccine equity. For example, patients in hot climates, remote regions, and low-resource settings would need cheap, transportable, and easy-to-use vaccines. On the way to achieving vaccine equity, vaccine development programs would be required to prioritize logistical concerns, such as whether a vaccine can survive outside of a fridge or be administered in a single shot.

"It's important to figure out who are the most marginalized people living in your area. ... How can you make the vaccine easy for them to get? That is what vaccine equity looks like."

For the process of reaching marginalized communities by successfully deploying a vaccine to achieve vaccine equity, it is imperative to the process to take a "human-centered" public health approach. This approach is one that can address and respond to the concerns of local individuals and organizations, aiding in prevention of marginalization via vaccine equality. For example, vaccines could be made available by going to where people live, and partnering with houses of worship and other community centers, rather than relying on people to travel to hospitals or doctor's offices. In Laos, measures taken included repairing roads to remote areas, buying vans with modern refrigeration to transport vaccines, and visiting residences, temples, and schools to discuss the importance of vaccination.

As part of Laos' public health campaign, President Thongloun Sisoulith was publicly vaccinated, on television, to encourage others to follow his example. Working with leaders and trusted community members within communities who can present important information and publicly identify and counter misinformation can be very successful. This type of approach was used in India, which was certified as free of poliomyelitis in 2014. In that public health campaign, 98% of the "social mobilizers" involved were women, whose involvement was critical.

=== Vaccine messaging ===
Effective communication about public health risks consists of concise messaging focused on a few specific talking points which are supported by evidence. An initial message may focus on what is happening, what to do, and how to do it, followed up by more detailed information and guidance on where to find additional resources.

Part of effective communication is to avoid confusing or overwhelming people. Simple messages may be presented initially can be and then supplemented by more complex information as needed. Messages should be clear about the limits of what is known: explicitly identifying the boundaries of evolving knowledge rather than relying on speculation or providing inconsistent information.

Local officials and trusted community leaders often play a central role in effective vaccine communication, as they may better understand local concerns and contexts It is important to be aware of and address issues such as health disparities, abuse, neglect, and disinformation that may affect communities. Disinformation tends to thrive under conditions of confusion, distrust and disenfranchisement. Countering disinformation is not just a matter of presenting facts and figures. People need to feel heard and their concerns need to be considered.

Misinformation about vaccines has been identified as another barrier to vaccine uptake. Exposure to unverified or misleading claims has been associated with declines in vaccination intent and confidence. Such disinformation, whether disseminated by news outlets or posted on social media, may affect individuals' willingness to get vaccinated and can influence the effectiveness of vaccination programs.

Language barriers are also an important factor in vaccine equity and public health communication. In the United States, individuals who reported higher English proficiency were more likely to have received the HPV vaccine, which may reflect the interventions and awareness campaigns that have predominantly targeted English speaking populations. Communities where English is not the primary language showed lower HPV vaccination rates, highlighting the potential role of language barriers in vaccinations. These findings underscore the potential importance of providing health communication in different languages to support equitable access to HPV vaccinations.

== Geographical distributions ==
=== Migrant populations ===
Migrants and refugees in Europe and other regions face multiple difficulties in obtaining vaccinations and are often under-vaccinated compared with host populations. People arriving from Africa, Eastern Europe, the Eastern Mediterranean, and Asia are more likely to have incomplete or delayed vaccination. Recently arrived refugees, migrants, and asylum seekers are less likely to be fully vaccinated than longer-term residents from the same communities. Those with limited contact with healthcare services, no citizenship, or lower income are also more likely to be under-vaccinated.

Barriers to vaccination among migrants include language and literacy challenges, limited understanding of entitlements to vaccination, concerns about side effects, and gaps in health professionals' knowledge of relevant vaccination guidelines. Structural and legal factors—such as lack of documentation, fixed address, or healthcare registration—also restrict access. These barriers can be reduced through tailored communication, clear policies, community engagement, and vaccination offered in accessible local settings.

Evidence from systematic reviews indicates that these challenges are not limited to Europe. Across regions, ethnic minority and migrant populations have faced persistent structural, informational, and trust-related barriers to COVID-19 vaccine access, highlighting the importance of inclusive communication and equitable delivery systems.

== COVID-19 ==
Priorly developed work for other coronaviruses allowed the COVID-19 vaccination development team to have a head start, speeding up development and trials. Specifically, COVID-19 vaccination development began in January 2020. On May 15, 2020, Operation Warp Speed was announced as a partnership between the United States Department of Health and Human Services and the Department of Defense. $18 Billion was contracted out to eight different companies to develop COVID-19 vaccinations intended for the US population; major companies included were Moderna, Pfizer, and Johnson & Johnson. These three companies received the earliest emergency use approval from the FDA, therefore being the most common vaccinations in the United States.

Vaccine inequality has been a major concern in the COVID-19 pandemic, with most vaccines being reserved by wealthy countries, including vaccines manufactured in developing countries. Globally, the problem has been distribution; supply is adequate. Not all countries have the ability to produce the vaccine. In low-income countries, vaccination rates long remained almost zero. This has caused sickness and death.

Vaccine inequity during the COVID-19 pandemic showed the disparity between minority groups and countries. Based on income and rural or urban setting, vaccination rates were vastly disproportionate. As of 19 March 2022, 79% of people in high income countries had received one or more doses of a COVID-19 vaccine, compared with just 14% of people in low income countries. By April 25, 2022, 15.2% of people in low income countries had received at least one dose, while overall globally 65.1% of the global population had received at least one dose.

Throughout the data of COVID-19 vaccination records, rates have consistently been much lower for lower income groups than that of middle and higher income groups. COVID-19 vaccination rates are higher in urban settings, and lower in rural settings. In an underdeveloped country such as Nigeria, vaccination rates are under 11% nationally. Because of persistent vaccine inequity, many countries continue to not have access to free or affordable COVID-19 vaccinations.

Our World in Data provides up to date statistics of COVID-19 vaccine access between nations, socioeconomic groups, and more.

In September 2021, it was estimated that the world would have manufactured enough vaccines to vaccinate everyone on the planet by January 2022. Vaccine hoarding, booster shots, a lack of funding for vaccination infrastructure, and other forms of inequality mean that it is expected that many countries will still have inadequate vaccination.

On August 4, 2021, the United Nations called for a moratorium on booster doses in high-income countries, so that low-income countries can be vaccinated. The World Health Organization repeated these criticisms of booster shots on the 18th, saying "we're planning to hand out extra life-jackets to people who already have life-jackets while we're leaving other people to drown without a single life jacket". UNICEF supported a "Donate doses now" campaign.

== Eradication of disease through vaccination equity ==
Disease eradication results from a combination of measures that include achieving vaccine equity, ensuring that global populations have equal access to vaccines and preventive measures against disease. One example of this from recent human history is the eradication of smallpox disease on a global scale.

Smallpox is the only disease to be successfully eradicated worldwide and was previously one of the most detrimental and prolific diseases throughout the course of human history. For example, the World Health Organization recorded around 50 million cases in the year 1950, although this is estimated to be only one percent of all cases.

This was accomplished through many factors, including disease prevention programs and widespread vaccine administration. Under direction from the World Health Organization, countries implemented mass vaccination campaigns and achieved vaccination rates of at least 80%. These mass campaign strategies and programs, along with the development of the bifurcated needle, contributed to the elimination of smallpox as a global threat to human health.

== See also ==
- Economics of vaccines
- Vaccine resistance
- GAVI
- COVAX
- CEPI
- Developing Countries Vaccine Manufacturers Network
- Smallpox
