= Suresh Jadhav (biotechnology executive) =

Indian biotechnology executive (died 2021)

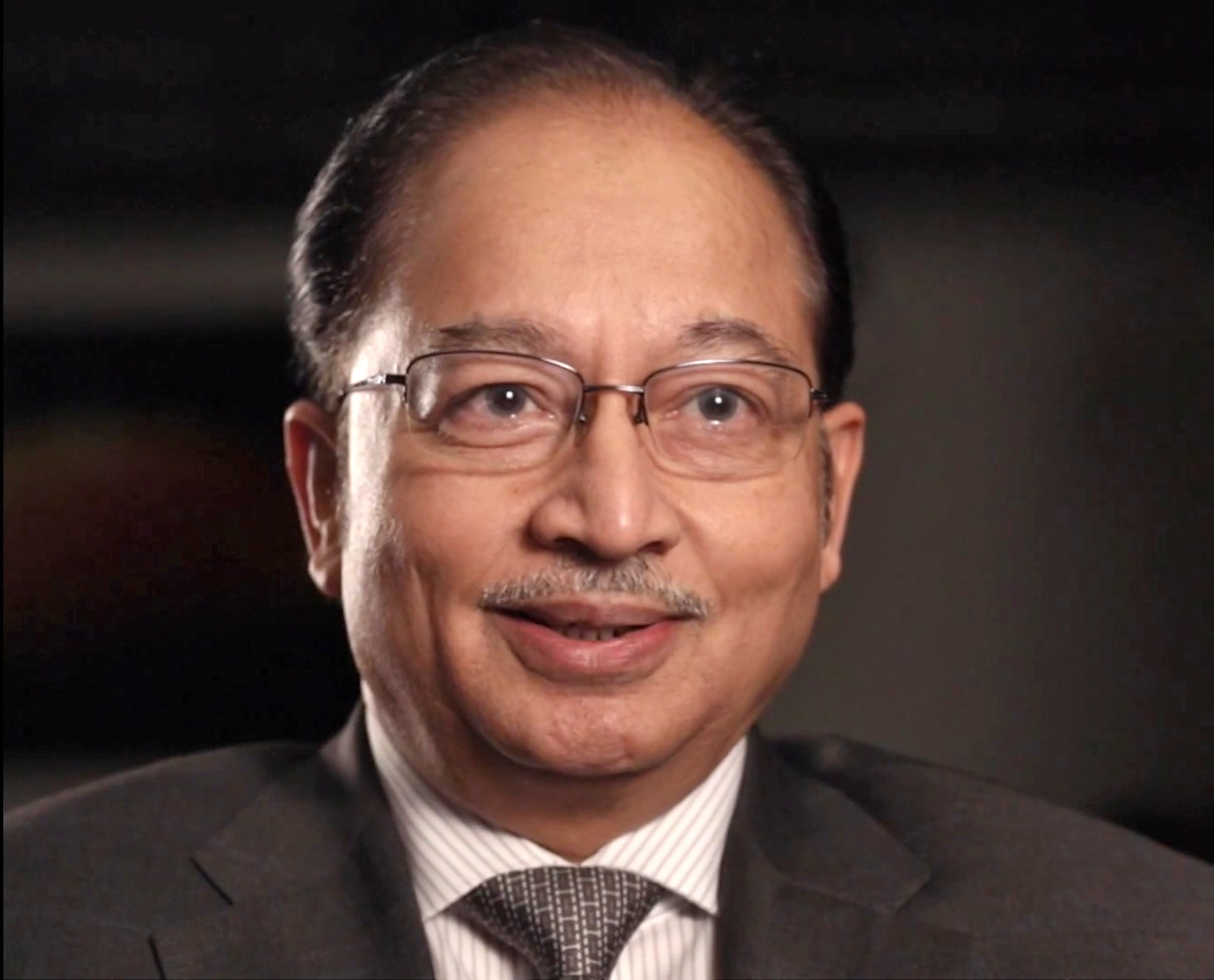
- Jadhav in a 2013 video for Doctors Without Borders
- Born: c. 1948–49; Vidarbha, Maharashtra, India
- Died: 7 December 2021); Pune, Maharashtra, India
- Occupation: Biotechnology executive

Suresh Jadhav (c. 1948–49 – 7 December 2021) was an Indian biotechnology executive and a key member of the Indian vaccine manufacturing industry. At the Serum Institute of India (SII) he led the development and introduction of the Meningococcal A conjugate vaccine to Sub-Saharan Africa and the production of the COVID-19 vaccine at SII, including the ones marketed as Covishield.

Jadhav was a member of the board of the GAVI vaccine alliance, and a member of the Indian government's expert committee on vaccines and other biologicals and a member of the Indian Pharmacopoeia Commission.

== Early life and education ==
Jadhav was born in a village in Vidarbha in the eastern part of the Indian state of Maharashtra. He completed his master's degree in pharmacy and later obtained a PhD from the Nagpur University.

== Career ==
He started his career in 1970 with a research fellowship at the Council of Scientific and Industrial Research (CSIR) before moving to the academia and teaching at the Department of Pharmaceutical Sciences, Nagpur, SNDT women's university, and the Haffkine Institute in Bombay.

Jadhav joined the Serum Institute of India (SII) in 1979, where he was responsible for manufacturing, laboratory and clinical practices, and quality control. He has been recognized as one of the contributors to SII being established as the world's largest vaccine manufacturer in the world. He became an executive director at the institute in 1992, and was responsible for manufacturing and quality control. He set up the institute's manufacturing facilities in Manjri near Pune. During his time at the SII, he led the development and introduction of the Meningococcal A conjugate vaccine to Sub-Saharan Africa. He also contributed to SII's acquisition of Bilthoven Biologicals in the Netherlands.

Jadhav's actions contributed to SII securing the World Health Organization accreditation for various vaccines enabling the company to export its vaccines to governments and health organizations across 140 countries. He was also a contributor to the Expanded Program on Immunization and had driven the partnership between the Bill and Melinda Gates Foundation and SII. Jadhav was also a member of the leadership team that worked on producing the COVID-19 vaccine at SII, including the ones marketed as Covishield.

Jadhav was also a member of various professional bodies and committees including the WHO committees relating to vaccine policy, reference standards, testing and validation studies. He was the president of the Developing Countries Vaccine Manufacturers Network, an alliance of vaccine manufacturers from developing countries, between 2004 and 2008. He was also a member of the board of GAVI vaccine alliance and was a member of its program and policy committee. He was also a member of the European Vaccine Institute and was a member of the Indian government's expert committee on vaccines and other biologicals and a member of the Indian Pharmacopoeia Commission. He was the co-chairman of the Confederation of Indian Industry's national committee on biotechnology for 2019–20.

== Personal life ==
Jadhav was married and had two children. He died from renal failure in Pune, on 7 December 2021.

== Selected works ==
- Jadhav, Suresh; Jarrett, Stephen; Hayman, Benoit; et al. (22 July 2020). "Emerging manufacturers engagements in the COVID −19 vaccine research, development and supply". Vaccine. 38 (34): 5418–5423. doi:10.1016/j.vaccine.2020.06.022. ISSN 0264-410X. PMC 7287474. PMID 32600908.
- Jadhav, Suresh; Gautam, Manish; Mishra, Sanjay; et al. (1 June 2013). "Determination of withaferin A and withanolide A in mice plasma using high-performance liquid chromatography-tandem mass spectrometry: Application to pharmacokinetics after oral administration of Withania somnifera aqueous extract". Journal of Pharmaceutical and Biomedical Analysis. 80: 203–212. doi:10.1016/j.jpba.2013.03.001. ISSN 0731-7085. PMID 23584079.
- Jadhav, Suresh; Kulkarni, Prasad S.; Kapre, Subhash V.; et al. (15 August 2007). "Mumps Outbreaks in Canada and the United States: Time for New Thinking on Mumps Vaccines". Clinical Infectious Diseases. 45 (4): 459–466. doi:10.1086/520028. ISSN 1058-4838. PMID 17638194. S2CID 7653831.
- Jadhav, Suresh; Saha, Santanu; Bani, Sarang; et al. (21 January 2009). "Immunomodulatory activity of Asparagus racemosus on systemic Th1/Th2 immunity: Implications for immunoadjuvant potential". Journal of Ethnopharmacology. 121 (2): 241–247. doi:10.1016/j.jep.2008.10.028. ISSN 0378-8741. PMID 19038322.
- Jadhav, Suresh; Yeolekar, Leena; Kulkarni, Prasad; et al. (1 July 2011). "A pandemic influenza vaccine in India: From strain to sale within 12 months". Vaccine. Transfer of Technology for Pandemic Influenza Vaccine Production in Developing Countries. 29: A16–A21. doi:10.1016/j.vaccine.2011.04.119. ISSN 0264-410X. PMID 21684421.
- Jadhav, Suresh; Leite, Luciana C. C.; Datla, Mahima; et al. (18 April 2013). "Developing Countries Vaccine Manufacturers Network: Doing good by making high-quality vaccines affordable for all". Vaccine. Decade of Vaccines. 31: B176–B183. doi:10.1016/j.vaccine.2012.11.060. ISSN 0264-410X. PMID 23598479.
- Jadhav, Suresh; Datla, Mahima; Kreeftenberg, Hans; Hendriks, Jan (20 March 2008). "The Developing Countries Vaccine Manufacturers' Network (DCVMN) is a critical constituency to ensure access to vaccines in developing countries". Vaccine. 26 (13): 1611–1615. doi:10.1016/j.vaccine.2008.01.034. ISSN 0264-410X. PMID 18294742.
