= Aurélia Nguyen =

Public health official

Aurélia Nguyen is a French-Vietnamese public health official, and the current Deputy Chief Executive Officer of CEPI (Coalition for Epidemic Preparedness Innovations). She previously was the managing director of the COVAX Facility at Gavi (formerly Global Alliance for Vaccines and Immunization.). In her role at COVAX, she works on providing COVID-19 vaccines to lower income countries, and tackling issues such as vaccine diplomacy, exports controls, limited supplies and cold-chain logistics.

== Education and career ==
Nguyen received an undergraduate degree in chemistry from Imperial College London, followed by a master's degree in health policy, planning and finance London School of Economics and from the London School of Hygiene and Tropical Medicine (LSHTM). She worked for the World Health Organization where she conducted research on medical policies. Between 1999 and 2010, she worked at GlaxoSmithKline and led the development of policies on access to medications and vaccines in the developing world.

She joined Gavi in 2011, where she worked find ways to support financially sustainable vaccine programs and markets, and notably worked on strategies to supply Ebola vaccines and HPV vaccines against cervical cancer to developing countries. In October 2020, she was appointed managing director of the Office of the COVAX Facility. In 2021, Nguyen was selected as a Bloomberg New Economy Catalyst. As part of the program, Aurelia attended the annual New Economy Forum held in Singapore, and the Bloomberg New Economy Catalyst Retreat that same year.
