= TRIPS Agreement waiver =

Waiver from certain provisions of the TRIPS Agreement for the Prevention, Containment and Treatment of COVID-19
- Presented: 2 October 2020
- Signatories: (South Africa) (India) Official co-sponsors (Kenya) (Eswatini) (15-16 October 2020) 64 countries by November 2021
- Purpose: WTO TRIPS waiver proposal

Full text
- Waiver from certain provisions of the TRIPS Agreement for the Prevention, Containment and Treatment of COVID-19 at Wikisource
- opponents

The TRIPS Agreement waiver (officially titled the Waiver from certain provisions of the TRIPS Agreement for the Prevention, Containment and Treatment of COVID-19) is a joint intervention communication by South Africa and India to the TRIPS council of the World Trade Organization (WTO) on 2 October 2020.

The two countries are suggesting a temporary patent waiver for COVID-19 drugs, COVID-19 vaccines and related equipment and technologies in four categories of intellectual property under the TRIPS agreement. The four categories, as enunciated in sections of the TRIPS agreement, cover– copyright, industrial designs, patents and protection of undisclosed information. The duration of the waiver is based on the time frame in which the world can develop an immunity against COVID-19.

Generally, wealthier countries oppose the waiver, while poorer countries support it. Reuters noted that the European Union, the United States and Switzerland, countries opposing the waiver, are home to large pharmaceutical companies and have excellent domestic vaccine availability. In May 2021, Reuters quoted an unnamed industry sources as saying that they were attempting to narrow the waiver, seeing little chance of blocking it.

A waiver would have to be agreed to by all 164 WTO member countries; any one dissenter could scupper the deal. The WTO has not managed to get agreement on any substansive new policy since it was founded in 1995. Proponents (including Oxfam) have accused opponents of stalling, and of filibustering by asking the same questions over and over.

== Support ==
On 15–16 October 2020, at the WTO TRIPS Council meeting Kenya and Eswatini became official co-sponsors while 100 countries welcomed or fully supported the proposal; a number of countries did not support the proposal, particularly members of the European Union and Switzerland. By 16 November 2021 the number of co-sponsors grew to 64. Precedents include an African Union communication to the World Health Organization, urging it to ensure universal access to vaccines, in June 2020. Challenges other than patents would still remain such as access to raw materials.

The European Union, the United States and Switzerland, among others, oppose the waiver. Reuters quoted an unnamed industry sources as saying that they were attempting to narrow the waiver, seeing little chance of blocking it.

Tedros Adhanom Ghebreyesus, Director-General of the World Health Organization (WHO), supported the waiver. A significant non-state opponent is Bill Gates, who is heavily involved in vaccine activism. His views on legal monopolies in medicine have been linked to his views on legal monopolies in software.

== Arguments ==
=== Potential increase in vaccine production ===
Proponents and opponents often agree that an increase in vaccine production would be good. They often agree that it would improve vaccine equity by vaccinating the world's poor years earlier, and thus reduce the risk of new variants (including vaccine-resistant variants) evolving. Proponents argue that the waiver would increase vaccine production, opponents argue that it would not.

Opponents argue that there is a shortage of manufacturing capacity, and waiving licensing cannot remedy it. They argue that developing countries cannot safely manufacture vaccines.

According to Médecins sans Frontières (MSF, also called Doctors without Borders), this is the case for making traditional live vaccines (vaccines that use modified live viruses, like the Oxford–AstraZeneca COVID-19 vaccine). Making live vaccines requires rare expertise and manufacturing facilities that take years to set up. By contrast, it is much easier to make a new type of vaccine, mRNA vaccines, such as the Moderna and Pfizer vaccines. In January 2021, some Moderna shots were being manufactured by a chemical company with no previous vaccine experience.

=== Trade secrets ===
Vaccine manufacturers have refused to share manufacturing information with Doctors without Borders and the WHO.

=== Market incentives ===
It has been argued that a waiver would make pharmaceutical companies less willing to respond to the next crisis; Pharmaceutical companies have argued that it "would undermine innovation". In rebuttal, it has been argued that vaccine development was publicly funded, and thus presented little or no risk to pharmaceutical companies, and that any portion of development costs not covered by public funds has been recouped many times over by profits. Public funding agreements did not include much transparency. Some estimates are that public funds are paying for the research, development, testing, regulatory approval, manufacturing, and advance purchase orders, so that the manufacturers are taking negligible risk, pointing to tenfold increases in stock prices. The companies also get to keep the IP for technological advances made with public funding, allowing them to make more profit in the future.

While "Big Pharma" and the state are frequently identified as key to creating the structures that motivate market incentives, philanthropies also play an important role. Indeed, different forms of interaction between firms, state agencies, and philanthropies work together to capture value from biomedical innovation. While some vaccine manufacturers claim they are selling vaccines at cost, and taking no profit, this is impossible to verify because they are not publishing the financial data.

An editorial in The Lancet called waivers "reasonable in a time of global catastrophe", arguing that the global economy would benefit from broader vaccination, because supply chains cross borders, and even areas with very high vaccination rates depend on areas with lower vaccination rates for goods and services. Tedros Adhanom Ghebreyesus also listed the pandemic's effects on child development and education, and argued that companies would still get royalties, likening the arrangements to those used in wartime.

=== Risk of new variants ===
Pharmaceutical companies argued that a waiver would "raise the risk of unsafe viruses", despite a lack of evidence.

Proponents argue that a waiver would allow vaccinating the world's poor years earlier, and thus reduce the risk of new variants (including vaccine-resistant variants) evolving. These include Tedros Adhanom Ghebreyesus, who argued that poor vaccine coverage meant that the virus had "more opportunities to mutate and potentially undermine the efficacy of vaccines everywhere", warning "We could end up back at square one".

The SARS-CoV-2 Omicron variant has been cited as an example of why the waiver is needed.

=== Existence of problem ===
A British World Trade Organization delegate called it "an extreme measure to address an unproven problem". Pharmaceutical companies have argued that the WTO's existing compulsory licensing rules were equivalent to the proposed waiver. Writing for the Cato Institute, James Bacchus agreed, and said that arguments that compulsory licensing (instead of a waiver) would slow production lacked experiential evidence; "There is no evidence of the need for such a waiver", and that there was no evidence that the WTO had not struck the correct balance between making lifesaving vaccines available sooner and preserving innovation-driving incentives. Pharmaceutical companies maintain IP "tickets", with multiple patents, copyrights, trade secrets, and undisclosed test datasets for each medicine they make. Each would need a compulsory license, and it is debated whether the WTO rules could force licensing of all of them. Compulsory licensing also has to be done on a country-by-country basis. Negotiating the bureaucracy has been called "nigh impossible" for the complex multi-country multi-component supply chains of some COVID-19 vaccine manufacture.

=== Nationalism ===
Countries have also argued that the waiver is bad because it would let their patents and copyrights be used by countries with whom they have poor relations.

== See also ==
- The Coalition for Epidemic Preparedness Innovations, founded before the pandemic to avoid such problems, failed to obtain IP rights in exchange for funding vaccine development.
