= Richard Hatchett =

American epidemiologist

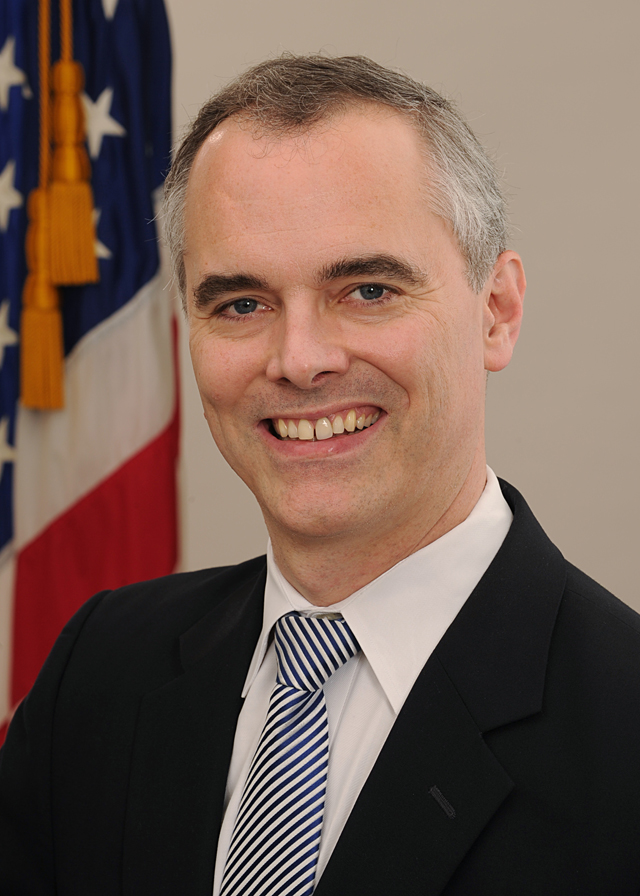
Dr Richard J. Hatchett (2011)

Richard Hatchett is an American oncologist and epidemiologist who has been chief executive officer of the Coalition for Epidemic Preparedness Innovations (CEPI) in Oslo and London since 2017. He was awarded the Secretary of Health and Human Services's Award for Distinguished Service.

== Early life and education ==
Hatchett grew up in Alabama. He graduated from Vanderbilt University and Vanderbilt University School of Medicine. He completed an internship and residency in Internal Medicine at New York Hospital – Cornell Medical Center, and a fellowship in Medical Oncology at the Duke University Hospital. He was also a research associate at the National Heart & Lung Institute at Imperial College London and spent three months in northeast Gabon investigating three closely related Ebola outbreaks.

== Career ==
=== Early career ===
In 2001, Hatchett worked as an attending in the urgent care center at Memorial Sloan Kettering Cancer Center in New York City and was planning to start an oncology fellowship in the summer of 2002. In the immediate aftermath of the September 11 attacks, he volunteered at the World Trade Center site. He subsequently moved to Washington, D.C. to help set up the new Medical Reserve Corps (MRC) in 2002.

=== Career in government ===
From 2005 until 2006, Hatchett was Director for Biodefense Policy on the United States Homeland Security Council and was a principal author of the National Strategy for Pandemic Influenza Implementation Plan. He was also on a pandemic planning team, under President George W. Bush. In this capacity, he devised the concept of social distancing as a non-pharmaceutical intervention intended to prevent the spread of a contagious disease.

From 2005 until 2011, Hatchett was associate director for Radiation Countermeasures Research and Emergency Preparedness at the National Institute of Allergy and Infectious Diseases (NIAID), under the leadership of Anthony Fauci. In 2007, he was the lead author of a study in Proceedings of the National Academy of Sciences of the United States of America comparing public-health responses to the Spanish flu in cities like St. Louis and Philadelphia. He also advised on the US government's handling of the 2009 swine flu pandemic.

In addition to his role at NIAID, Hatchett was Director for Medical Preparedness Policy on the Homeland Security Council under President Barack Obama from 2009 until 2011.

Hatchett was the Chief Medical Officer and deputy director of the United States Biomedical Advanced Research and Development Authority (BARDA) from 2011 to 2016 before becoming the organization's acting Director in 2016. At BARDA, he oversaw programs to develop medical countermeasures against chemical, biological, radiological and nuclear threats, pandemic influenza, and emerging infectious diseases and led or helped lead the development of vaccines, therapeutics and diagnostics for a number of emerging viruses, including the H3N2v and H7N9 influenza viruses, MERS, Ebola and Zika.

=== CEO of CEPI, 2017–present ===
In 2017, Hatchett was appointed as CEO of the Coalition for Epidemic Preparedness Innovations, succeeding interim CEO John-Arne Røttingen. In May 2020, amid the COVID-19 pandemic, he was appointed to the expert advisory group for the UK Government's Vaccine Task Force. When the UK held the rotating presidency of the Group of Seven (G7) in 2021, the government also appointed him as a member of the Pandemic Preparedness Partnership, chaired by Patrick Vallance.

Under Hatchett's leadership, CEPI funded early development of COVID-19 candidate vaccines. CEPI also teamed up with the African Union to fund African vaccine production. Together with Seth Berkley, he developed the concept for COVAX in early 2020. CEPI is organizing a 2022 Covid summit.

In March 2020, Hatchett warned about COVID-19. He does not think Intellectual property rights significantly contribute to vaccine shortages. He is concerned about supply chain problems, and export controls.
