= Seth Berkley =

American medical epidemiologist (born 1956)

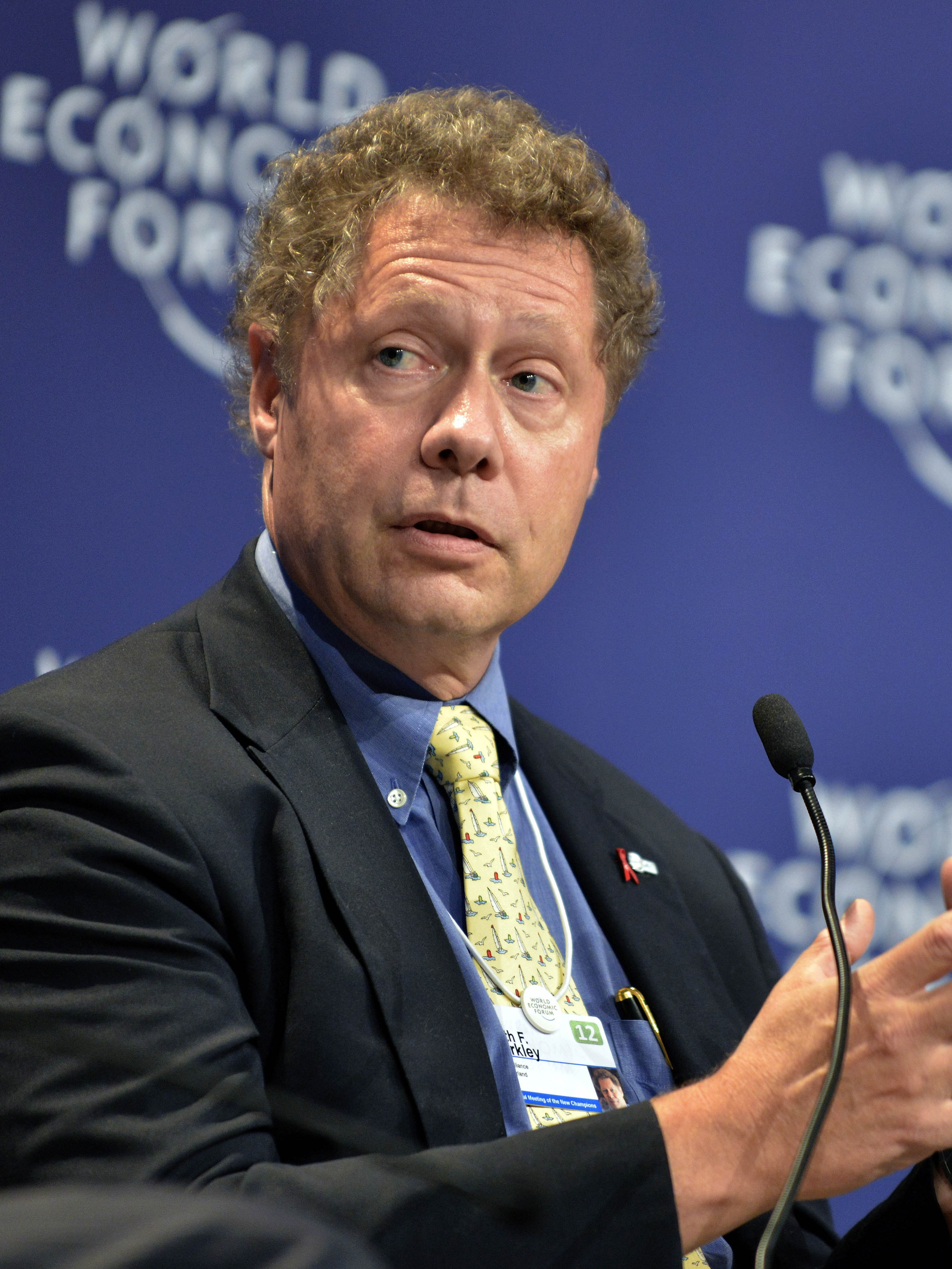
- Berkley at the World Economic Forum Annual Meeting of the New Champions in 2012
- Born: October 18, 1956 (age 70); New York City, U.S.
- Education: Brown University
- Occupation: epidemiologist
- Years active: 1986-present
- Known for: Founder and former president and CEO of the International AIDS Vaccine Initiative (1996-2011); former CEO of Gavi, the Vaccine Alliance (2011-2023)

Seth Franklin Berkley (born October 18, 1956) is an American medical epidemiologist and a global advocate of the power of vaccines. He is the founder and former president and CEO of the International AIDS Vaccine Initiative (IAVI) and former CEO of Gavi, the Vaccine Alliance. He is currently a senior advisor to the Pandemic Center at Brown University School of Public Health.

== Early life and education ==
Berkley was born in New York City.

In 1974, Berkley graduated from McBurney School, a private school in New York City. In 1978, he received a ScB from Brown University. In 1981, he received a M.D. from Brown University's Alpert Medical School. Berkley then trained in internal medicine at Harvard University.

== Career ==
From 1984 to 1986, Berkley worked as a medical epidemiologist for the Center for Infectious Diseases of the U.S. Centers for Disease Control and Prevention (CDC) in Atlanta, GA. While working for the CDC, Berkley was involved in, among other things, managing the national Toxic Shock Syndrome surveillance system. He also conducted an investigation of an outbreak of Brazilian Purpuric Fever, a disease that was killing children in Brazil, and helped to discover the etiologic agent. In 1986, on assignment from the CDC, Berkley served as an epidemiologist for the Massachusetts Department of Public Health, working on routine surveillance and outbreak investigations.

A year later, while working for the Carter Presidential Center in Atlanta, Berkley was assigned as an epidemiologist at the Ministry of Health in Uganda. In this role, he worked to establish and manage the Ugandan surveillance system for AIDS, validate the AIDS clinical case definition for Africa and assist with the conduct and analysis of the national HIV sero-survey. Berkley played a role in helping to develop Uganda's National AIDS Control programs, and served as an attending internal medicine physician at Mulago Hospital in Kampala.

Subsequently, Berkley worked for the Rockefeller Foundation, initially as program scientist and finally as associate director of the Health Sciences Division. During his eight years with the Rockefeller Foundation, Berkley managed programs in epidemiology, public health, medical and nursing education, vaccination, AIDS and sexually transmitted diseases and reproductive health in Africa, Asia, and Latin America. Some of his initiatives included developing a public health training program, Public Health School without Walls, which began in Zimbabwe, Ghana, Uganda, and then spread to Vietnam, as well as an international program to support non-governmental organizations working on AIDS, the International HIV/AIDS Alliance. He also represented the Rockefeller Foundation during meetings of the United Nations' Children's Vaccine Initiative, which was later replaced by Gavi, the Vaccine Alliance.

=== IAVI, 1996–2011 ===
In 1994, the Rockefeller Foundation, where Berkley was serving as associate director of health sciences, convened a series of international consensus meetings on the need for a new effort to address existing barriers to the development of an AIDS vaccine and jump-start AIDS vaccine research. These meetings, culminating in a conference in Bellagio, Italy, became the impetus for the establishment of IAVI in 1996 as an international NGO tasked with aggressively pursuing previously neglected approaches to AIDS vaccine development. Berkley was appointed interim president and later became CEO.

Under Berkley's leadership, the organization evolved into a worldwide public-private product development partnership with a staff of more than 200 employees that has worked with partners in 25 countries and, with partners, conducted 24 HIV vaccine trials.

=== Gavi, the Vaccine Alliance, 2011–2023 ===
Berkley joined Gavi, the Vaccine Alliance as its chief executive officer (CEO) in August 2011. Gavi is a public-private partnership whose mission is to save children's lives and protect people's health by increasing access to immunisation in developing countries.

Since its launch in 2000, Gavi has prevented more than fifteen million future deaths and helped protect 981 million children with new and underused vaccines. Gavi brings together developing country and donor governments, the World Health Organization, UNICEF, the World Bank, the vaccine industry in both industrialised and developing countries, research and technical agencies, civil society organizations, the Bill & Melinda Gates Foundation and other private philanthropists.

Berkley and Coalition for Epidemic Preparedness Innovations (CEPI) CEO Dr. Richard Hatchett were involved in founding COVAX, the global COVID-19 pandemic vaccine initiative, following a meeting at the World Economic Forum in Davos. COVAX is directed by Gavi, the Coalition for Epidemic Preparedness Innovations (CEPI), the World Health Organization (WHO) and UNICEF.

In June 2021, Gavi announced that Berkley would be stepping down from his role of CEO in early August 2023. During his tenure as CEO, Gavi added various new vaccines to its portfolio including HPV, polio, cholera and malaria. Berkley was replaced by David Marlow.

== Selected professional affiliations ==
Berkley has sat on a number of international steering committees and corporate and not-for-profit boards, including those of Gilead Sciences, the New York Academy of Sciences, the Acumen Fund, the Council of Foreign Relations, the Scientific Advisory Panel assisting the UNAIDS High Level Commission on HIV Prevention, Oxfam America, the Guttmacher Institute, VillageReach, VaxInnate, PowderJect, Napo pharmaceuticals and the US National Academy of Medicine.

- Fellow, American College of Physicians
- Fellow, Council on Foreign Relations
- Fellow, Infectious Diseases Society of America
- Fellow, Massachusetts Medical Society
- Founding Member, The Network of AIDS Researchers of Eastern and Southern Africa

== Academic appointments ==
- Adjunct Professor, Brown University School of Medicine
- Adjunct Professor, Columbia University Mailman School of Public Health
- Adjunct Professor, New York University School of Medicine

== Recognition ==
Berkley has appeared on the cover of Newsweek and recognized by Wired as among "The Wired 25"—a salute to dreamers, inventors, mavericks and leaders—as well as by Time magazine as one of the "100 Most Influential People in the World" in 2009. In 2010, Fortune magazine named Berkley as one of its "Global Forum Visionaries".

In addition, Berkley has received honorary degrees, including the following:

- 2013, Nelson Mandela Metropolitan University, honorary doctorate

== Selected works and publications ==
=== Books ===
- Jamison, Dean T.; Bobadilla, José-Luis; Hecht, Robert; Hill, Kenneth; Musgrove, Philip; Saxenian, Helen; Tan, Jee-Peng; Berkley, Seth (part time); Murray, Christopher J. L. (part time) (1993). World Development Report 1993: Investing in Health. New York: World Bank, Oxford University Press. doi:10.1596/0-1952-0890-0. ISBN 978-0-19-520890-0. OCLC 917239316.
- Armstrong, D; Cohen, J; Berkley, S; Carbon, CJ; Clumeck, N; Durack, DT; Finch, RG; Kiehn, TE; Louria, DB; McAdam, K; Norrby, SR; Opal, SM; Polsky, BW; Quie, PG; Ronald, AR; Solberg, CO; Verhoef, J, eds. (1999). Infectious Diseases. London: Mosby. ISBN 978-0-723-42328-7. OCLC 937187135.
- Cohen, J; Powderly, WG; Berkley, S; Calandra, T; Clumeck, N; Finch, RG; Hammer, SM; Holland, SM; Kiehn, TE; Maki, DG; McAdam, K; Norrby, SR; Opal, SM; Ronald, AR; Solberg, CO; Verhoef, J, eds. (2004). Infectious Diseases. Edinburgh: Mosby. ISBN 978-0-323-02607-9. OCLC 1136020957.

=== Articles ===
- Berkley SF, Hightower AH, Broome CV, Reingold AL. The relationship of tampon characteristics to menstrual toxic shock syndrome. JAMA 1987; 258:917-920.
- The Brazilian Purpuric Fever Study Group (report written by Fleming DW and Berkley SF). Brazilian Purpuric Fever: Epidemic purpura fulminans associated with antecedent purulent conjunctivitis. Lancet 1987; 8562:757-761.
- The Brazilian Purpuric Fever Study Group (report written by Berkley SF and Harrison L). Haemophilus aegyptius bacteremia in Brazilian Purpuric Fever. Lancet 1987;8562:761-763.
- Berkley SF, Widy-Wirski R, Okware SI, Downing R, Linnan MJ, White KE, Sempala S. Risk factors associated with HIV infection in Uganda. J Infec Dis 1989; 160:22-30.
- Berkley SF, Naamara W, Okware SI, Downing R, Konde-lule J, Wawer M, Musagaara M, Musgrave S. AIDS and HIV Infection in women in Uganda—are women more infected than males. AIDS 1990; 4:1237-1242.
- Heeler C, Berkley SF. Initial lessons from emerging public-private partnerships in drug and vaccine development. Bulletin of the World Health Organization 2001, 79:728-734.
- Klausner RD, Fauci AS, Corey L, Nabel GJ, Gayle H, Berkley S, et al. The Need for a Global HIV Vaccine Enterprise. Science, Jun 27 2003: 2036–2039.
- Berkley SF. Thorny issues in the ethics of AIDS vaccine trials. The Lancet, 2003; 362: 992.
- Berkley SF. Ending an Epidemic: The International AIDS Vaccine Initiative pioneers a public-private partnership. Innovations, 2006; 1:52-66.
- Berkley, Seth Franklin; Koff, Wayne Chester (July 2007). "Scientific and policy challenges to development of an AIDS vaccine". The Lancet. 370 (9581): 94–101. doi:10.1016/S0140-6736(07)61054-X. PMID 17617277. Wikidata ()
- Berkley, Seth; Fore, Henrietta (26 April 2019). "Health for all". Science. 364 (6438): 309. Bibcode:2019Sci...364..309B. doi:10.1126/SCIENCE.AAX7591. PMID 31023899. Wikidata ()
- Fore, Henrietta H; Ghebreyesus, Tedros Adhanom; Watkins, Kevin; Greenslade, Leith; Berkley, Seth; Bassat, Quique; Duneton, Philippe; Klugman, Keith; Golden, Alma (November 2020). "Leveraging the COVID-19 response to end preventable child deaths from pneumonia". The Lancet. 396 (10264): 1709–1711. doi:10.1016/S0140-6736(20)32348-5. PMC 7832073. PMID 33188731. Wikidata ()
- Berkley, Seth (2020). "Equitable access to COVID‑19 vaccines must remain a priority if we are to end this crisis: In my view". Development Co-operation Report 2020: Learning from Crises, Building Resilience. Paris: OECD Publishing. doi:10.1787/60779fc2-en. ISBN 9789264904910. S2CID 234440273.
- Berkley, Seth (6 February 2021). "Vaccines for all". New Scientist. 249 (3320): 21. doi:10.1016/S0262-4079(21)00193-7. S2CID 234005122.
- Koff, Wayne C.; Berkley, Seth F. (19 February 2021). "A universal coronavirus vaccine". Science. 371 (6531): 759. Bibcode:2021Sci...371..759K. doi:10.1126/science.abh0447. PMID 33602830.
- Excler, Jean-Louis; Saville, Melanie; Berkley, Seth; Kim, Jerome H. (April 2021). "Vaccine development for emerging infectious diseases". Nature Medicine. 27 (4): 591–600. doi:10.1038/S41591-021-01301-0. PMID 33846611.

== See also ==
- GAVI Alliance
- International AIDS Vaccine Initiative
- HIV vaccine
