= International AIDS Vaccine Initiative =

Global organization developing vaccines

- Formation: 1996; 30 years ago
- Founder: Seth Berkley
- Headquarters: New York, NY
- Website: https://www.iavi.org

IAVI (acronym derived from International AIDS Vaccine Initiative) is a global not-for-profit, public-private partnership originally founded to accelerate the development of vaccines to prevent HIV infection and AIDS; their mission has expanded to include vaccines and antibodies for tuberculosis, and emerging infectious diseases.

IAVI researches and develops vaccine candidates, conducts policy analyses, serves as an advocate for the HIV prevention field and engages communities in the trial process and AIDS vaccine education. The organization takes a comprehensive approach to HIV and AIDS that supports existing HIV prevention and treatment programs while emphasizing the need for new AIDS prevention tools. It also works to ensure that future vaccines will be accessible to all who need them.

== History ==
In 1994, the Rockefeller Foundation convened an international meeting of AIDS researchers, vaccinologists, public health officials, and representatives from philanthropic organizations in Bellagio, Italy, to evaluate the challenges facing HIV/AIDS vaccine development and identify ways to jump-start research.

The International AIDS Vaccine Initiative was founded in 1996 by epidemiologist Seth Berkeley with the mission of accelerating the development and global distribution of preventative AIDS vaccines.

In February 2023, Muhammad Ali Pate was appointed chairman of the Vaccine Alliance (Gavi), which works to provide vaccines in low-income countries.

== Activities ==
IAVI's scientific team, drawn largely from private industry, researches and develops AIDS vaccine candidates and engages in clinical trials and research through partnerships with more than 100 academic, biotechnology, pharmaceutical and governmental institutions.

In September 2009, a global group of researchers led by IAVI published a study in the journal Science identifying PG9 and PG16, two highly powerful broadly neutralizing antibodies against a wide variety of HIV variants. The site on the virus to which PG9 and PG16 attach revealed a vulnerability on HIV. PG9 and PG16 were the first new broadly neutralizing antibodies against HIV discovered in more than a decade and are the result of a global effort launched in 2006.

== Partnerships ==
To address major obstacles in AIDS vaccine development, IAVI partners with HIV researchers from around the world. Its Neutralizing Antibody Center is a network dedicated to discovering and understanding broadly neutralizing antibodies against HIV and using that knowledge in the design of vaccines.

IAVI is a founding member of the Global HIV Vaccine Enterprise, an alliance of independent organizations working towards an AIDS vaccine. It also partners with civil society organizations and other entities to advocate jointly for the development of AIDS vaccines, and is a member of the Global Health Technologies Coalition, an alliance of more than 30 non-profit groups that aims to increase awareness of the urgent need for technologies that save lives in developing countries.

== Donors ==
IAVI's work is funded by donors including: the Bill & Melinda Gates Foundation, the Coalition for Epidemic Preparedness Innovations, the Ministry of Foreign Affairs of Denmark, Irish Aid, the Ministry of Finance of Japan in partnership with The World Bank, the Ministry of Foreign Affairs of the Netherlands, the United Kingdom Department for International Development, and the United States Agency for International Development (USAID).

== See also ==
- Seth Berkley
- Clinical trial
- Advance market commitments
