= Economics of vaccines =

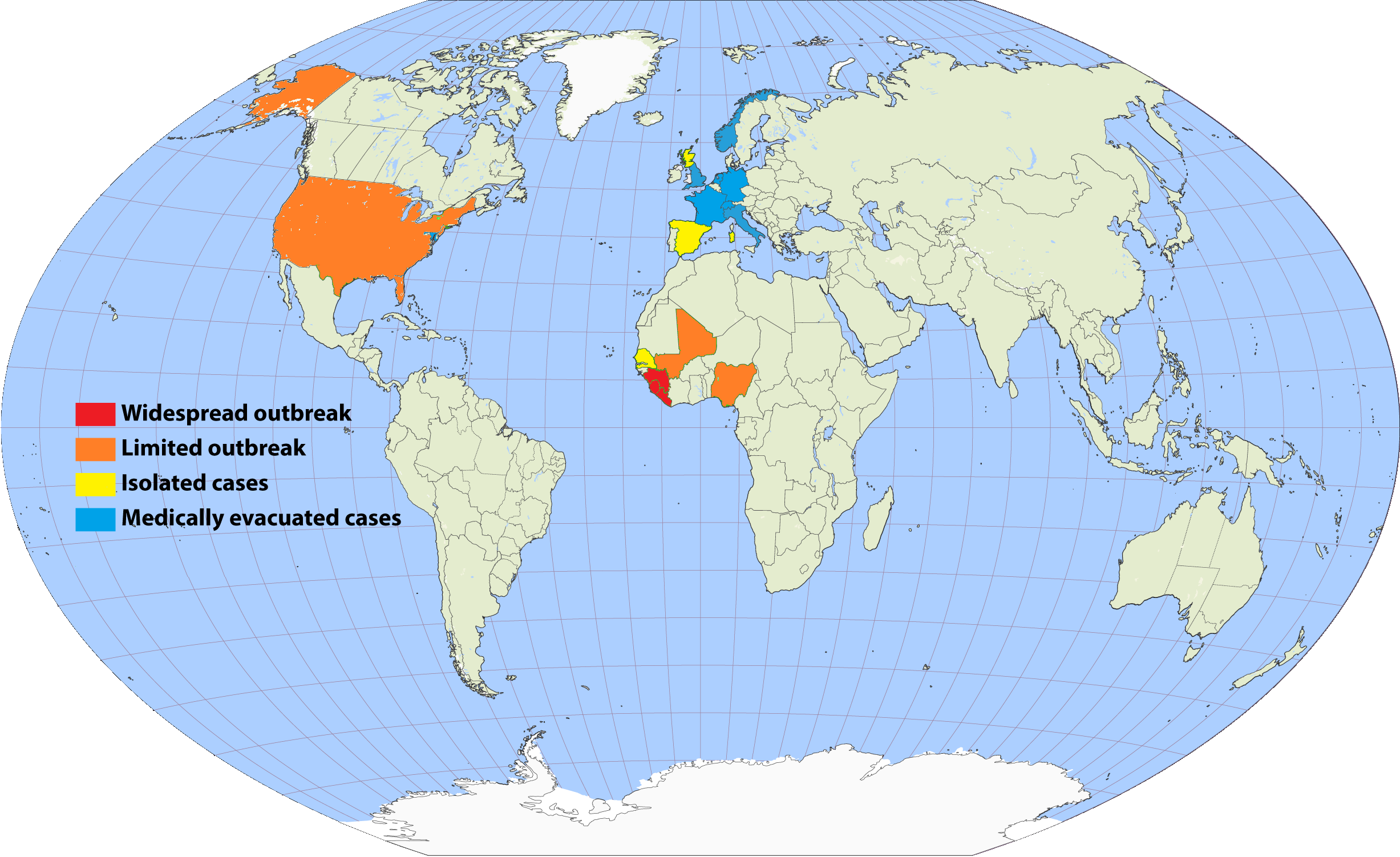
The struggle to get access to vaccine in the 2013-2016 Ebola epidemic was primarily socio-economic, not technical

Vaccine development and production is economically complex and prone to market failure. Development is unprofitable in rich and poor countries, and is done with public funding. Production is concentrated in the hands of a small number of powerful companies which acquire key legal monopolies and make very large profits.

Many of the diseases most demanding a vaccine, including HIV, malaria and tuberculosis, exist principally in poor countries. In the United States, financial returns are usually minimal and the financial and other risks are great. Most vaccine development to date has therefore relied on "push" funding by government, universities and non-profit organizations. In almost all cases, pharmaceuticals including vaccines are developed with public funding, but profits and control of price and availability are legally accorded to private companies. Proposed solutions include requiring results from publicly funded research to be public-domain. Past efforts along these lines have failed by regulatory capture.

In contrast to research and development, the vaccine production market, even for out-of-patent vaccines, is highly concentrated. 80% of global production is in the hand of five large companies, which hold key patents. This reduces competition and allows high, uncompetitive prices, often more than 100 times the cost of production.

Many vaccines have been highly cost-effective and beneficial for public health. Vaccine effort that is beneficial to society is vastly in excess of that which is beneficial to vaccine producers. The number of vaccines actually administered has risen dramatically in recent decades.

== Market concentration ==
While vaccine research and development is done by many small companies, large-scale vaccine manufacturing is done by an oligopoly of big manufacturers. A March 2020 New York Times article described the political effects of this market structure: "government and international health organizations know that any vaccine developed in a lab will ultimately be manufactured by large pharmaceutical firms. At this critical juncture with coronavirus, no health expert would publicly criticize drug companies, but privately they complain that pharma is a major speed bump in developing lifesaving vaccines."

Concentration and monopolization of the manufacture of specific drugs has also led to supply shortages, and significant healthcare costs for employing people to track down hard-to-get drugs.

This oligopoly power allows vaccine manufacturers to engage in price discrimination, and vaccine prices are often two orders of magnitude (~100x) higher than the manufacturer's stated manufacturing costs, as of 2015. Sales agreements often require that the buyer keeps the price secret and agrees to other non-competitive restrictions; the exact nature and extent of this problem is hard to characterize, due to agreements being secret. Price secrecy also disadvantages vaccine purchasers in price negotiations. It also makes market analysis difficult and hinders efforts to improve affordability.

The first decade of the 2000s saw a large number of mergers and acquisitions, and as of 2010, 80% of the global vaccine market was in the hands of five multinationals: GlaxoSmithKline, Sanofi Pasteur, Pfizer, Merck, and Novartis. Of these, Novartis does not focus on vaccine development. Patents on key manufacturing processes help maintain this oligopoly.

=== National vaccine-manufacturing facilities ===
Some countries have set up local manufacturing facilities, especially during the COVID-19 pandemic. Sometimes the government simply gives a private company money to set up a privately owned vaccination facility locally; sometimes the facility is partly controlled or owned by the government. Facilities that produce less than 100 million doses per year face diseconomies of scale, increasing the costs of vaccines. Sequential stages in the production of a vaccine dose may also be done in different facilities and shipped across borders.

In 2017, the UK had draft plans to build a national facility, later called the UK Vaccine Manufacturing Innovation Centre (VMIC). Plans came to involve industry partners including Merck and Johnson and Johnson. The facility was delayed by negotiations between industry funders and, which did not end until the country was well into the pandemic. It was originally slated to cost the government £66m. The facility was expanded and built in a rush during the pandemic, and eventually cost the government £200 million; by December of 2021, the government was trying to sell off its share (it was still trying ot sell it nearly a year later). The decision was widely criticized. It was suggested that the government not sell, or at least retain the ability to commandeer production.

Ghana built a US$122 million vaccine manufacturing facility using funding from the International Finance Corporation of the World Bank Group, working with a consortium of three Ghanaian pharmaceutical companies. It was planned to start shipping vaccines in 2024.

Italy planned a public-private vaccine production facility. Canada built a publicly owned production facility, which at 24 million doses per year is not expected to be cost-competitive with larger commercial facilities.

== Epidemic response ==
In the past, the market power of pharmaceutical companies has delayed responses to epidemics. Manufacturers have successfully negotiated favourable terms, including market guarantees and indemnification, from governments, as a condition of manufacturing vaccines. This has delayed responses to some epidemics by months, and prevented responses to other pandemics entirely. Some intellectual property issues also hinder vaccine development for epidemic preparedness, as in the case of rVSV-ZEBOV.

== Market incentives ==
There is also no business incentive for pharmaceutical companies to test vaccines that are only of use to poor people. Vaccines developed for rich countries may also have short expiry dates, and requirements that they be refrigerated until they are injected and given in multiple shots, all of which may be very difficult in remote areas. In some cases, it has simply never been tested whether the vaccine will still be effective if the requirements are not followed (say, if it retains potency for several days unrefrigerated).

In almost all cases, pharmaceuticals including vaccines are developed with public funding, but profits and control of price and availability are legally accorded to private companies. The profits of large pharmaceutical companies are mostly used on dividends and share buybacks, which inflate executive pay, and on lobbying and advertising. Innovation is generally bought along with the small companies that developed it, rather than produced in-house; low percentage R&D spending is sometimes touted as an attraction to investors. The financialization focus of the pharmaceutical industry, especially in the US, has been cited as an obstacle to innovation.

There have been ethical issues raised with accepting donations of generally unaffordable vaccines.

== Demand ==
While the vaccine market makes up only 2-3% of the pharmaceutical market worldwide, it is growing at 10-15% per year, much faster than other pharmaceuticals (as of 2010). Vaccine demand is increasing with new target population in emerging markets (partly due to international vaccine funders; in 2012, UNICEF bought half of the world's vaccine doses). Vaccines are becoming the financial driver of the pharmaceutical industry, and new business models may be emerging. Vaccines are newly being marketed like pharmaceuticals.

Vaccines offer new opportunities for funding from public-private partnerships (such as CEPI and GAVI), governments, and philanthropic donors and foundations (such as GAVI and CEPI's donors). Pharmaceutical companies have representation on the boards of public-private global health funding bodies including GAVI and CEPI. Private donors often find it easier to exert influence through public-private partnerships like GAVI than through the traditional public sector and multilateral government institutions like the WHO; PPPs also appeal to public donors. Philanthropic funding means that vaccines are now rolled out to large developing markets less than 10 or 20 years after they are developed, during the patent validity term of the patent owner. Newer vaccines are much more expensive than older ones. Lower-income countries are increasingly a profitable vaccine market.

== Public domain ==
Baker (2016) observed that the vast majority of the cost of most diagnostic, preventive and treatment procedures are patent royalties: The unit costs are almost universally a tiny fraction of the price to the consumer. Moreover, in the US "the government spends more than $30 billion a year on biomedical research through the National Institutes of Health". And researchers (individuals and organizations) routinely obtain patents on products whose development was paid for by taxpayers, per the Bayh–Dole Act of 1980. Baker claims that the US population would have better health care at lower cost if the results of that research were all placed in the public domain.

Moreover, the cost of those diagnostic, preventive and treatment procedures would be lower the world over if the results of publicly funded research were in the public domain. This would likely lead to better control of infectious diseases worldwide. That, in turn, would likely reduced the disease load in the US.
