= Developing Countries Vaccine Manufacturers Network =

Public health association

DCVMN International (Developing Countries Vaccine Manufacturers Network)
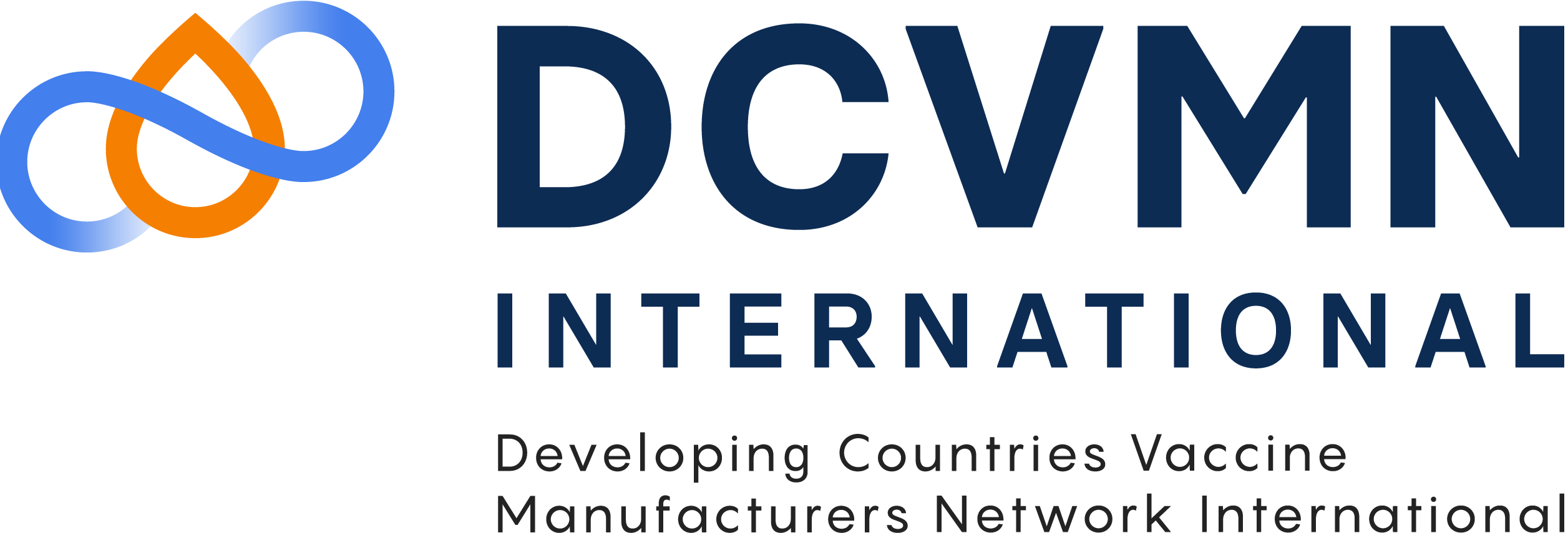
- Formation: 2000; 25 years ago
- Legal status: Non-profit organization
- Purpose: Vaccine equity
- Headquarters: Nyon, Switzerland
- CEO: Rajinder Suri
- Website: https://dcvmn.org/

The Developing Countries Vaccine Manufacturers Network (DCVMN International) is a voluntary non-partisan public health alliance of health organizations and vaccine manufacturers. DCVMN aims to protect people globally against known and emerging infectious diseases through the provision of a consistent supply of high quality vaccines at affordable prices for developing countries, to achieve vaccine equity. DCVMN includes many It was established in 2000/2001, and is headquartered in Switzerland.

As of 2025, DCVMN International comprises over 48 public and private manufacturers across 17 countries and territories in Africa, Asia, Europe, the Middle East, and Latin America. During the COVID-19 pandemic, DCVMN members supplied more than 60% of the global vaccine supply of COVID-19 vacccines, with 8 different vaccine technology platforms used to develop these vaccines between all of the 20 members that are engaging in the COVID-19 vaccine effort. DCVMN members reported that they had the capability to supply over 400 distinct vaccine products to 170 countries, more than 100 of these vaccines have WHO Prequalification, totalling more than 6 billion vaccine doses annually.

Members are developing and producing novel vaccines for illnesses including neglected tropical diseases: rotavirus, Japanese encephalitis, pertussis, haemophilus influenzae, hepatitis B, hepatitis E, meningitis A, cholera, poliovirus, human papillomavirus infection, dengue fever, Chikungunya virus and COVID-19.

The DCVMN is active in identifying obstacles in the processes of vaccine registration and use. It works to increase coordination of requirements and procedures to improve the prequalification, procurement and supply of vaccines. This can involve governments in different countries, the World Health Organization (WHO), and United Nations agencies such as UNICEF.

The network has received funding from the Bill & Melinda Gates Foundation.

DCVMN International is registered as a legal entity under Swiss jurisdiction, operating under Articles 60 and beyond of the Swiss Civil Code. While the DCVMN headquarters are anchored in Switzerland, the CEO's office is based in India.
