= GAVI =

Global health organization

Gavi (Global Alliance for Vaccines and Immunization)
- 2014 logo, evoking UN logos
- Founded: 2000; 26 years ago
- Type: Public–private partnership
- Legal status: Active
- Location: Geneva, Switzerland
- CEO: Sania Nishtar
- Key people: Sania Nishtar, Seth Berkley, Dagfinn Høybråten, José Manuel Barroso, Anuradha Gupta
- Website: www.gavi.org

GAVI, officially Gavi, the Vaccine Alliance (previously the GAVI Alliance, and before that the Global Alliance for Vaccines and Immunization) is a public–private global health partnership with the goal of increasing access to immunization in poor countries. It is the largest organisation distributing donations of money towards vaccines; from 1990 to 2016, more than a third of donor money for immunisation was channelled through Gavi.

Gavi supports the immunization of almost half the world's children. Gavi has helped immunize over 760 million children, preventing over 13 million deaths worldwide, helping increase diphtheria vaccine coverage in supported countries from 59% in 2000 to 81% in 2019, contributing to reducing child mortality by half. It also seeks to improve the economics of vaccines, negotiating bulk prices, supporting price discrimination, and reducing the commercial risks that manufacturers face when selling vaccines to the poor and developing vaccines. It also provides funding to strengthen health systems and train health workers across the developing world, though the effectiveness of its health-system-strengthening programs is disputed.

Along with Global Health Initiatives (GHIs) in general, Gavi was described as innovative, effective, and less bureaucratic than multilateral government institutions like the WHO. Gavi programmes may produce quantified results within an election cycle, which is appealing to parties locked in an election cycle. One author described Gavi's approach to public health as business-oriented and technology-focused, using market-oriented measures, and seeking quantifiable results. Gavi follows a model termed the "Gates approach" or US-type approach. It contrasts with the approach typified by the Alma Ata Declaration, which focuses on the effects of political, social, and cultural systems on health.

Gavi facilitates vaccinations in developing countries by working with donor governments, the World Health Organization, UNICEF, the World Bank, the vaccine industry in both industrialised and developing countries, research and technical agencies, civil society, the Bill & Melinda Gates Foundation and other private philanthropists. Gavi has observer status at the World Health Assembly. Gavi has been criticized for giving private donors more unilateral power to decide on global health goals, prioritizing new, expensive vaccines while putting less money and effort into expanding coverage of old, cheap ones, harming local healthcare systems, spending too much on subsidies to large, profitable pharmaceutical companies without reducing the prices of some vaccines, and its conflicts of interest in having vaccine manufacturers on its governance board. Gavi has taken steps to address some of these concerns.

== Funding ==
Gavi runs in five-year funding cycles which enables it to negotiate long-term deals with vaccine manufacturers. Industrialised countries are Gavi's principal donors, providing approximately three-quarters of the total funding. All donor governments are represented on the Gavi Board through a constituency system (i.e. one donor country will represent several donors in their constituency).

In the period of 2016–2020, Gavi received US$9.3 billion, with over half of the total funding provided by the three largest donors: the UK, the Bill & Melinda Gates Foundation (BMGF), and the USA (see table).

Following the Global Vaccine Summit in June 2020 hosted in the UK, US$8.8 billion was raised for the funding cycle 2021 to 2025; exceeding the target of US$7.4 billion. This included US$2 billion from the UK, US$1.6 billion from the Gates Foundation and US$1 billion from Norway.

For the 2026-2030 funding cycle, the UK announced it was committing to donate £1.25 billion (roughly US$1.7 billion), The Gates Foundation announced a US$1.6 billion contribution, and the US announced it was donating US$0. As a result, Gavi announced it would fall almost US$3 billion short of its budget aim of US$11.9 billion with a total budget of US$9 billion.

Five year contribution to Gavi (2016–2020) US$ million
Donor	Proceeds
United Kingdom	2,080
Bill & Melinda Gates Foundation	1,552
United States of America	1,380
Norway	830
Germany	773
France	549
Canada	410
Italy	401
Netherlands	301
Australia	263
Sweden	205
Japan	195
European Commission	183
Switzerland	36
Spain	33
Reed Hastings and Patty Quillin	30
Russia	28
Kingdom of Saudi Arabia	23
South Korea	22
Anonymous Swiss Foundation	22
"la Caixa" Foundation	17
Ireland	17
Denmark	15
Lions Club International	15
Kuwait	11
Qatar	10
Shell International	10
TikTok	10
Brazil	10
Comic Relief	8
India	7
Audacious Alliance	6
Red Nose Day Fund	6
Unilever	6
China	5
Mohamed bin Zayed Al Nahyan	5
New Zealand	5
Luxembourg	5
LDS Charities	4
Finland	3
Alwaleed Philanthropies	3
Rockefeller Foundation	3
South Africa	3
Girl Effect	2
Oman	2
IFPW	2
China Merchants Charitable Foundation	2
Reckitt Benckiser Group	1
Monaco	1
ELMA Vaccines and Immunization Foundation	1
Iceland	1
Al Ansari Exchange	1
UPS	1
Colombia	1
Other donors	3
Deferrals	−714
Total	8,804

== History and programs ==
GAVI was created in 2000 as a successor to the Children's Vaccine Initiative, which was launched in 1990. In August 2014, Gavi changed its name from "GAVI Alliance" and rebranded itself with a new logo deliberately reminiscent of UN organization logos, but using green as a mark of difference.

As mentioned above, Gavi plans its operations in terms of five-year stretegies to make it easier to negotiate longer-term deals. Gavi 6.0 (2026–2030) was approved by the Gavi board in June 2024. One of the goals is to build country-led, sustainable vaccination programs.

=== Vaccine development and advance market commitments ===
Advance Market Commitments (AMCs) aim to overcome market failure by making an advance pledge that if a vaccine for a certain condition is developed, meeting certain specifications, donors will buy a certain number of doses. Gavi seeks to design its AMCs in a way that encourages a competitive market.

Gavi has been particularly successful at promoting the uptake of newer vaccines.

=== Vaccination programs ===
Human Papillomavirus vaccine
Polio vaccine
Japanese Encephalitis vaccine
Meningococcal vaccine (Meningitis A vaccine)
Measles and rubella vaccine
Pneumococcal vaccine
Typhoid vaccine
Cholera vaccine
Rotavirus vaccine
Yellow fever vaccine
Pentavalent vaccine (Diphtheria, tetanus, pertussis, haemophilus influenza vaccine (Type B), Hepatitis B)
Ebola vaccine

Vaccines in programs supported by GAVI

Gavi's main objective is vaccination programs. Gavi has been the main funder of vaccination in low and middle income countries.

In 2012, the first Médecins Sans Frontières (MSF) "The right shot" report criticized Gavi for focusing on funding expensive new vaccines and neglecting to give children low-cost older ones. "Twenty percent of the world's children aren't even getting the basic vaccines", MSF's vaccine policy adviser said. MSF criticized the Global Vaccine Action Plan (GVAP), a WHO global collaboration of which Gavi is listed as a leader, as flawed for failing to help those 20%, which is some 19 million infants.

==== Pneumococcal vaccine ====
In 2010, as part of a 10-year pneumococcal vaccine Advance Market Commitment, the companies GlaxoSmithKline (GSK) and Pfizer were both allocated $225 million in AMC subsidies to provide 30 million doses annually at a maximum tail price of $3.50 per dose ($10.50 per child for three doses).

In 2011, Médecins Sans Frontières (MSF) recommended that Gavi change the ways in which it procures vaccines. MSF argued that the Advance Market Commitment had transferred more money to GSK and Pfizer than the Gavi grants had transferred to low-cost suppliers for technology transfer and product development. MSF said that large pharmaceutical multinationals had been found to put very high markups on prices, and internationally certified vaccine could be made for about 40% less cost by smaller companies in India and China, despite patent-related obstacles.

In January 2015, MSF also called upon GSK and Pfizer to cut the price of the pneumococcal vaccine to US$5 per child in developing countries, a price they estimated as competitive. They said that, as Pfizer had made $16 billion in revenue on pneumococcal vaccine in the last four years, a larger price cut would be affordable. In early 2016, they ran the "A fair shot" campaign to pressure GSK and Pfizer to drop prices. Pfizer said that they were already selling the vaccine at "far below" cost, while GSK said that the price enabled them to "just about" cover their costs, and "To discount it further would threaten our ability to supply it to these countries in the long-term".

Bill Gates said that criticizing pharmaceutical company pricing deterred them from investing in medicines for the developing world, and said that instead, pharmaceutical companies should be praised for price discrimination which reduces the price in poor countries. He also advocated improving low-temperature supply chains (a.k.a. cold chains) in developing countries.

In August 2019, MSF asked Gavi to stop giving Advance Market Commitment subsidies to GSK and Pfizer, whom they called a duopoly, and instead buy vaccine from a new third manufacturer, the Serum Institute of India, which offered the vaccine at 2/3 of the price then offered by the two. As the pneumococcal vaccine made up 40% of Gavi's vaccine purchasing costs, a 33% price drop would save Gavi billions (13% of its total vaccine purchasing costs). Pneumonia kills more than a quarter of children dying before the age of five, almost a million children each year. MSF said that GSK and Pfizer's pricing was exploitative and had left millions of children who could have been protected vulnerable. Gavi responded that low prices required large, stable, high-volume deals, and "careful consideration and the support of key constituencies". In June 2020, under Gavi's Advance Market Commitment, UNICEF and the Serum Institute of India entered an agreement which reduced the price of pneumococcal conjugate vaccines to $2 per dose.

=== Health systems strengthening debate ===
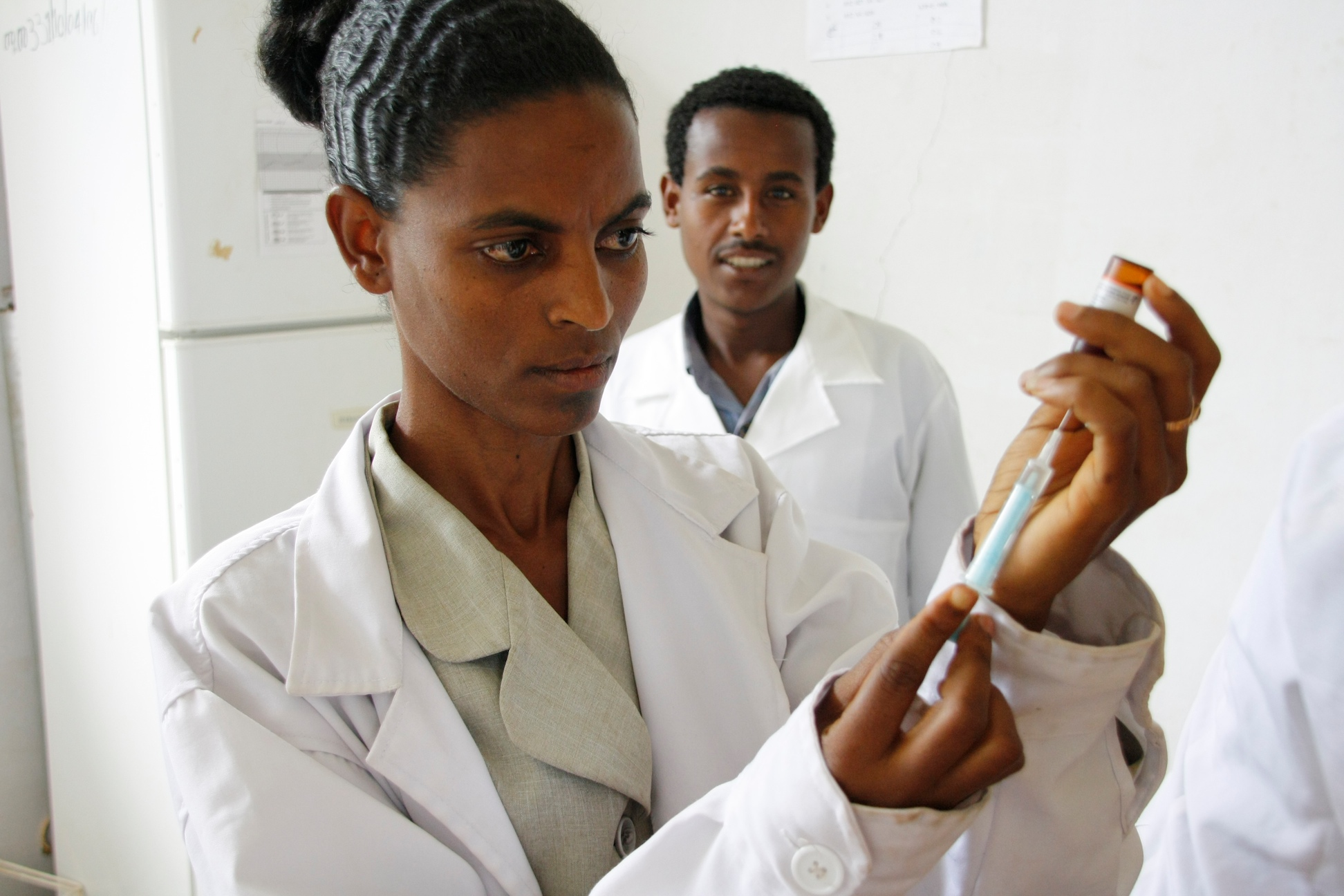
Preparing a measles vaccine supplied by Gavi at Mecha health centre, in northern Ethiopia

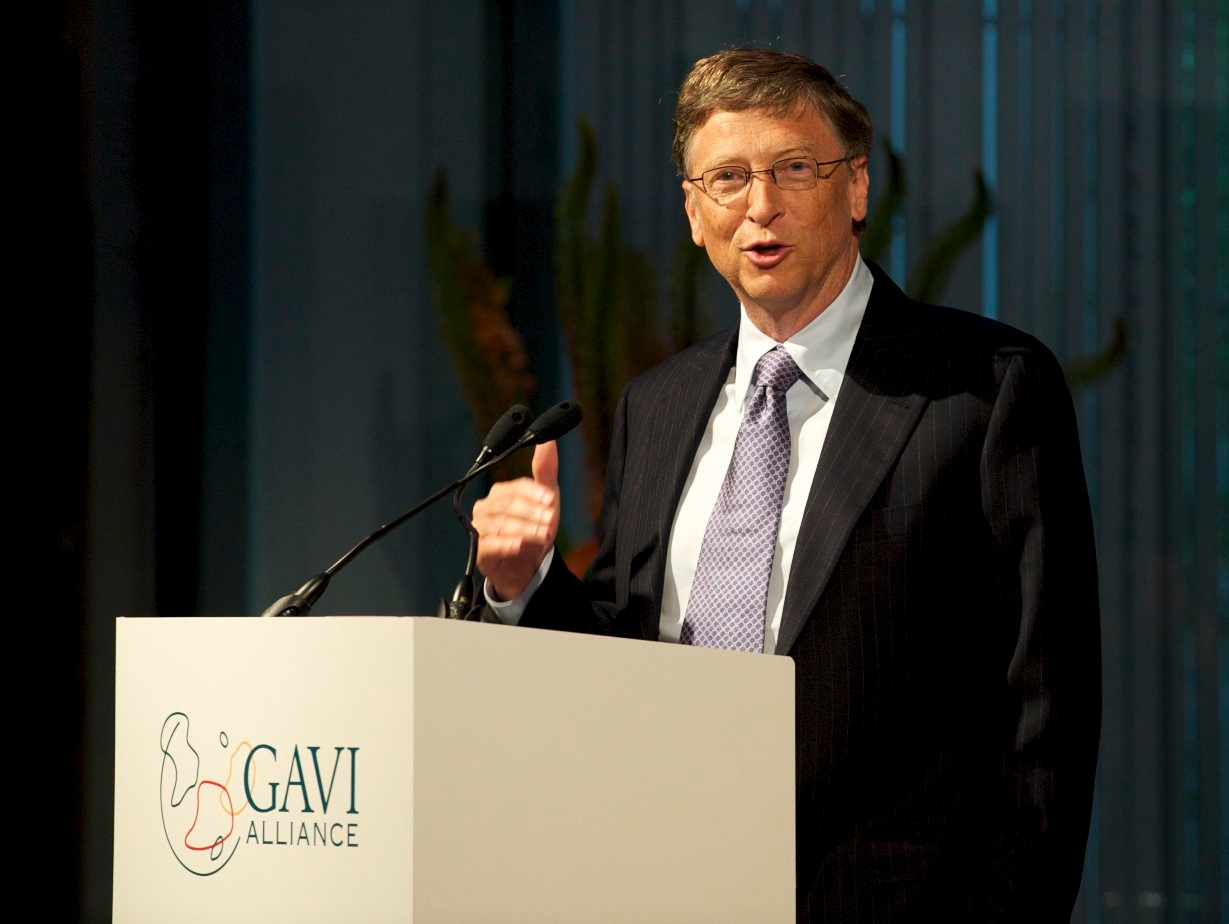
Bill Gates, speaking at the UK-hosted Gavi pledging event in June 2011

In the 20-naughts, Gavi had intense internal debate about its role in vaccinations and in health systems strengthening (HSS). This was part of a broader discussion in healthcare about "vertical" approaches (often targeting specific diseases or behaviours) and "horizontal" ones, targeting broad programs such as primary care. At Gavi, some argued that vaccination could not be effectively carried out and sustained without strengthening healthcare, citing experiences in Gavi's vaccination programmes, where availability of staff, training, transport, and funds had hindered vaccination and reporting of vaccination coverage and stocks. There were also worries that Gavi was undermining and paralyzing health care systems. Others argued that HSS was a distraction from Gavi's single-minded focus on vaccines, and HSS was a nebulous concept that could not be defined and quantified.

Major donors Norway and Britain supported HSS; USAID and the Bill & Melinda Gates Foundation (and Bill Gates personally) opposed it. The majority of vaccine experts tended to favour technological rather than HSS-based approaches. Pharmaceutical industry representatives were supportive of HSS, possibly because they saw it as key to sustainable markets for their products. In 2005, a narrow vote brought Gavi to endorse an HSS goal. Up to a quarter of Gavi's funding was dedicated to "strengthening the capacity of integrated health systems to deliver immunisation", in practice it has been around 10%. After 2010, this funding went through a joint-venture Health Systems Funding Platform. Gavi's funding for this platform was conditional on the platform meeting vaccine coverage goals.

As of the mid-2010s, few in Gavi were working on HSS, most of the former pro-HSS people had left, and some at Gavi dismissed HSS as PR to gain support from pro-HSS donors and counter criticisms that Gavi was harming healthcare systems. Such criticisms were generally not a topic that Gavi engaged with internally; the lack of internal engagement with the issue has been criticized. The disagreements were fairly intense; when Bill Gates came to visit Gavi headquarters, employees would hide the HSS-related posters so that he would not be reminded of this aspect of Gavi's work. Julian Lob-Levitt, who was Gavi's CEO between 2004 and 2010, was rumoured to have left over conflicts around his support for health system strengthening. Seth Berkley has been the CEO of Gavi since 2011, as of 2020.

It has been argued that Gavi's HSS spending in the early 2010s went to selective, disease-specific interventions repackaged as HSS. Gavi's HSS support at this time tended to focus on immunisation strengthening support, especially the building of cold chains. Gavi measured HSS using vaccination coverage as the sole indicator. It set the reporting indicators which were required of recipients of its funding; countries were not allowed to use similar indicators they already collected; this has been criticized for conferring a heavy accounting burden and diverting attention from indigenous goals. National government representatives did sit on the board, but had little influence; one European representative described the environment in the mid-2010s as "highly intimidating".

A 2016 funding-allocation analysis of a sample of Gavi grants found that just over half the money went to purchasing drugs, equipment, supplies, and facilities (and 3% on bonuses and incentive pay (Note: Of 22% on Human resources development/Performance management (fig2), 15.8% was spent on bonuses)). These are short-term funding activities which the WHO does not consider HSS. The proportions were higher in less-developed healthcare systems. There was no spending on operational research, improving use of existing resources, or developing national drug and vaccine policies. In some grants, HSS funds were mostly spent on day-to-day operational costs, with no exit plan for the funding. Gavi subsequently (before 2018) shifted HSS aid to focus more on sustainability and the principles of the Paris Declaration for Aid Effectiveness.

=== Market shaping ===
In 2011 Gavi added "shape the market for vaccines and other immunisation supplies" to its strategic goals.

==== Pentavalent vaccine ====
Gavi spent 15 years (2005–2020) with a program for shaping the pentavalent vaccine market to be more stable and competitive. The vaccine price fell with increased competition, and price discrimination declined. Whether Gavi met quantitative goals will be assessed in 2020.

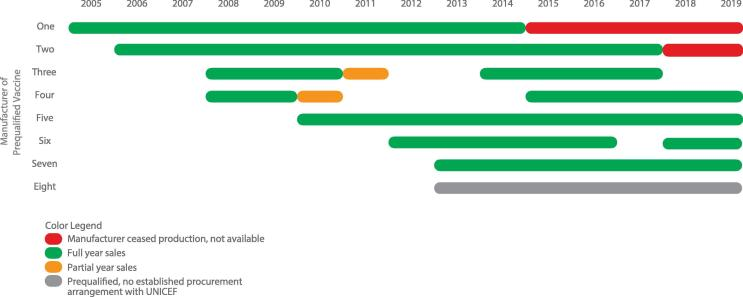
The number of manufacturers making certified pentavalent vaccine increased, making the market more competitive. Graph by Gavi; manufacturers are not named.

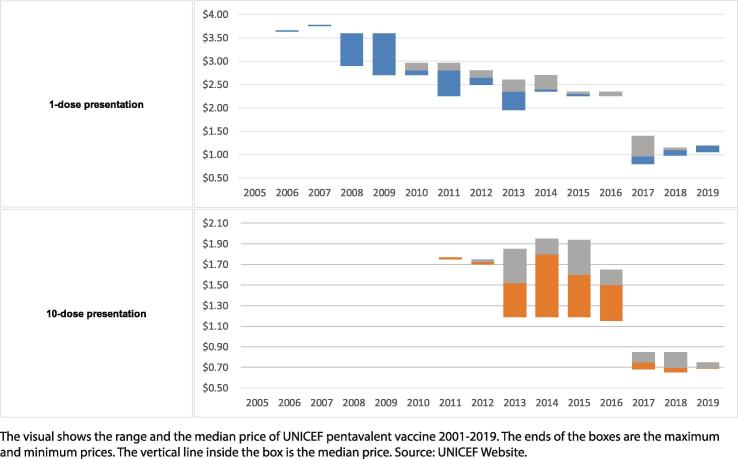
All pentavalent vaccine prices fell and price discrimination almost vanished. Graph by Gavi; non-UNICEF prices not shown

=== COVID-19 pandemic ===
In April 2020, Gavi's CEO Seth Berkley commented that the COVID-19 pandemic needed a global response whereby the best global facilities for separate parts of the processes should then be integrated into a global process. He said he hoped that the G20 countries should work together with a budget of tens of billions of dollars, and that individual countries should be prepared for finished vaccines to be allocated according to greatest need.

In September 2020, Gavi was announced as one of the organisations leading the COVAX vaccine allocation plan, created to ensure that any new COVID-19 vaccine would be shared equally between the world's richest and poorest countries.

The following month, Gavi announced the approval of up to $150 million to help 92 low- and middle-income countries prepare for the delivery of future COVID-19 vaccines, including technical assistance and cold chain equipment.

In January 2021, Seth Berkley announced that Gavi hoped to deliver 145 to 150 million doses of COVID-19 vaccines in the first quarter of 2021 and 500 million doses in the second quarter, and then 1.5 billion in the second half of the year.

In January 2022, The Washington Post reported that following 309 million coronavirus vaccine doses being delivered in December 2021, COVAX had delivered over 1 billion for the pandemic.

== Related organizations ==
=== Vaccine Impact Modelling Consortium ===
The Vaccine Impact Modelling Consortium (VMIC) consists of mathematical models of diseases to analyze the impact of Gavi's vaccines, mainly in terms of deaths averted and disability-adjusted life year loss prevented, and to help Gavi come up with ways to maximize the impact for a given amount of resources. It consists of several different groups of modellers working independently. In 2026, the VMIC published an analysis on the impact Gavi's vaccination programmes against 14 vaccine-preventable diseases across 117 low- and middle-income families. In terms of lives saved per 1000 vaccinations, HPV (11.24), measles (6.09), HepB (5.00), and malaria (2.78) were found to be the most imapctful. In terms of DALY-loss prevented per 1000 vaccinations, HPV (523.04), measles (411.01), malaria (203.04), and Hib (150.37) were the most impactful. This analysis describes the effect of increasing vaccination on top of an existing level of coverage and disease burden, so vaccinating against a disease that has already achieved herd immunity can appear less impactful.

== Awards ==
Gavi was awarded the 2019 Lasker-Bloomberg Public Service Award for "providing sustained access to childhood vaccines around the globe, thus saving millions of lives, and for highlighting the power of immunization to prevent disease".

Gavi was nominated for the 2021 Nobel Peace Prize by Norwegian MP Carl-Erik Grimstad.

Gavi was awarded the Sunhak Peace Prize in 2022 for promoting vaccine equity at the forefront of COVID-19 by leading COVAX, and for improving global health by increasing access to vaccines for children in vulnerable countries.

== See also ==
- CEPI
- Economics of vaccines
- Vaccine resistance
- Vaccine equity
