= Un mute =

"Un_mute"
- Limited edition cover

Single by Maaya Sakamoto

from the album Kioku no Toshokan
- Language: Japanese
- A-side: "Mada Tōku ni Iru" (double A-side)
- B-side: "Konna Hi ga Kuru Nante"
- Released: January 25, 2023
- Genre: J-pop; Anime song
- Length: 4:57
- Label: FlyingDog
- Composer: Sira
- Lyricist: Yuho Iwasato
- Producer: Maaya Sakamoto

Maaya Sakamoto singles chronology
| "Sumire" / "Kotoba ni Dekinai" (2022) | "Mada Tōku ni Iru" / "Un_mute" (2023) | "Dakishimete" (2024) |

Music video
- "Un_mute" on YouTube

"Un_mute" (stylized in lowercase) is a song by Japanese singer-songwriter and voice actress Maaya Sakamoto. Written by Yuho Iwasato and composed by Sira, the song served as the ending theme for the television anime series Revenger, and was released as a double A-side single along with "Mada Tōku ni Iru" on January 25, 2023, by FlyingDog.

== Background and release ==
Following the birth of her first child in April 2022, Sakamoto experienced a significant shift in her priorities and perspective. She commented that motherhood reoriented her life, placing family above her career, which had been her primary focus for decades since starting work as a student. She noted that this transition felt natural, as her extensive work experience prior to motherhood alleviated any pressure to rush back to performing. Sakamoto began working on what would be her following double A-side single just before going on maternity leave, and due to time constraints, she decided to reach out to long-time collaborator Yuho Iwasato and entrust her with writing the lyrics for one of the tracks. Sakamoto had been commissioned to come up with the ending theme song for the anime Revengers, and keeping in mind that it had to reflect the anime, Sakamoto gave Iwasato the keyword "forgiveness" and the imagery of “something frozen in time beginning to move again” as a starting point, allowing her creative freedom. For creating the music, Sakamoto reached out to Sira, whom she previously worked on her 2019 song "Hidden Notes". Sakamoto commented that she noted Iwasato's "love for the song" upon receiving Sira's composition, which contributed to a strong synergy in its creation.

Inspired by the song's title, Sakamoto named her comeback concerts Maaya Sakamoto Live 2022 "un_mute", which were held on November 26 and 27, 2022. The concert’s title was inspired by the song, as Sakamoto found the concept of “unmuting” fitting for her comeback, though she initially hadn’t planned to use it as the concert title.

The song was released as a double A-side single along with "Mada Tōku ni Iru" (the ending theme for the anime series The Fire Hunter) on January 25, 2023. The single was released in two formats: a standard edition and a limited first press edition, the latter including a bonus CD featuring 11 live tracks from the concert Maaya Sakamoto Live 2022 "Un_Mute".

== Composition and themes ==
"Un_mute" is a ballad characterized by a simple yet solemn sound, primarily featuring piano, strings, and percussion. Sakamoto described it as a grand yet quiet and emotional track, contrasting with the dynamic intensity of "Mada Tōku ni Iru." Sakamoto explained the song's meaning as: "It portrays time that was frozen starting to move again, where that frozen time represents things like personal regrets or the inability to recover from shocking events. It is about the feeling of being stuck while the world moves on, and the theme was to create music that could melt the ice in such a person’s heart, even just a little."

== Track listing ==
Mada Tōku ni Iru/Un_mute - CD single
| No. | Title | Lyrics | Music | Arrangement | Length |
|---|---|---|---|---|---|
| 1. | "Mada Tōku ni Iru" (まだ遠くにいる) | Maaya Sakamoto | Umuya Aneta; Sayuri Horishita | Aneta | 5:14 |
| 2. | "Un_mute" | Yuho Iwasato | Sira | Shin Kono | 4:57 |
| 3. | "Konna Hi ga Kuru Nante" (こんな日が来るなんて) | Sakamoto | Sakamoto | Katsutoshi Kitagawa; Acane_Madder | 4:28 |
| 4. | "Mada Tōku ni Iru" (Instrumental) | | | | 5:14 |
| 5. | "Un_mute" (Instrumental) | | | | 4:55 |
| 6. | "Konna Hi ga Kuru Nante" (Instrumental) | | | | 4:23 |
| Total length: | | | | | 29:11 |

== Personnel ==
Credits adapted from the liner notes of the "Mada Tōku ni Iru/Un_mute" CD single.

- Maaya Sakamoto – vocals, backing vocals, production
- Yuho Iwasato – songwriting
- Sira – songwriting, backing vocals
- Shin Kono – arrangements, acoustic piano, programming
- Hideaki Sakai – percussion
- Mio Strings – strings
- Hiromitsu Takasu – recording & mixing
- Hiroshi Kawasaki – mastering
- Masao Fukuda – A&R direction
- Shirō Sasaki – executive production
