= Mada Tōku ni Iru =

- Standard edition cover

Single by Maaya Sakamoto

from the album Kioku no Toshokan
- Language: Japanese
- A-side: "Un_mute" (double A-side)
- B-side: "Konna Hi ga Kuru Nante"
- Released: January 25, 2023
- Genre: J-pop; Anime song
- Length: 5:14
- Label: FlyingDog
- Composers: Umuya Aneta; Sayuri Horishita
- Lyricist: Maaya Sakamoto
- Producer: Maaya Sakamoto

Maaya Sakamoto singles chronology
"Sumire" / "Kotoba ni Dekinai" (2022)	"Mada Tōku ni Iru" / "Un_mute" (2023)	"Dakishimete" (2024)

Music video
- "Mada Tōku ni Iru" on YouTube

"Mada Tōku ni Iru" (まだ遠くにいる; lit. 'Still Far Away') is a song by Japanese singer-songwriter and voice actress Maaya Sakamoto. Co-written by Sakamoto with Umuya Aneta and Sayuri Horishita, the song served as the ending theme for the Wowow original anime series The Fire Hunter, and was released as a double A-side single along with "Un_mute" on January 25, 2023, by FlyingDog.

== Background and release ==
"Mada Tōku ni Iru" was written specifically for The Fire Hunter. Sakamoto, who also voices the character Akira in the series, wrote the lyrics for the song, while the music was composed by Umuya Aneta and Sayuri Horishita. Sakamoto began working on the song shortly after her twenty-first anniversary concert, over a year before its release. Since she began working on the wont, Sakamoto had the idea of a track "with an interesting structure," where the beginning and end would be completely different. With this in mind, she and her production team asked several composers to submit songs, and ultimately the track submitted Aneta felt the most fitting, as Sakamoto felt it perfectly matched the image she had for it. Sakamoto wrote the lyrics upon reading the novel The Fire Hunter, which she found captivating despite initially approaching it for work. As time passed, however, the lyrics took on new meaning for Sakamoto as global events, including wars and her own experience of becoming a mother, shifted her perspective.

The details of the song being part of The Fire Hunter were announced in November 2022. Sakamoto then commented: "I was deeply moved by the earnest lives of children born into a difficult era, and I wanted to create a powerful song that matches their life energy. The world has changed significantly since I wrote these lyrics last summer, and the unwanted future that felt "still far away" now seems to be right in front of us. Even so, I sang with the hope of never giving up, just like the characters in this story. I hope this song reaches many people." The series began airing on January 14, 2023.

The song was released as a double A-side single along with "Un_mute" (the ending theme for the television anime series Revenger) on January 25, 2023. The single was released in two formats: a standard edition and a limited first press edition, the latter including a bonus CD featuring 11 live tracks from Sakamoto's solo concert Maaya Sakamoto Live 2022 "Un_mute", held on November 26 and 27, 2022. A short version of the music video for "Mada Tōku ni Iru" was made available on YouTube prior to the single's release.

== Composition and themes ==
"Mada Tōku ni Iru" is characterized by its dynamic and complex composition, beginning with a quiet, introspective tone and building into a dramatic, expansive climax with layered choruses and intricate string arrangements. During production, Sakamoto explained that she envisioned a song that was unpredictable and grandiose to reflect the world of The Fire Hunter. The track features a live rhythm section and strings that create a sense of organic movement, which Sakamoto described as having a human warmth that distinguishes it from programmed music. She noted the performance's unique "sway," as if the musicians were pushing forward beyond the click track, adding to the song's emotional depth and evoking vivid imagery, like scenes passing by in a film.

The song's lyrics, penned by Sakamoto, draw heavily from the themes of The Fire Hunter novel. The story's depiction of a future where humanity cannot use fire prompted reflections on the dangers of misused tools and the burdens placed on younger generations due to past mistakes. The song's central theme revolves around resilience, capturing the idea that people must live determinedly in the era they are born into, carrying a metaphorical light forward despite adversity. The chorus blends positivity and resignation; Sakamoto commented that she initially hesitated to include the phrase "kirakira hikatteru" (shining brightly) due to the song's dark tone, but chose it to convey the immense energy of life as a form of "salvation," emphasizing that life itself radiates light even in dire circumstances.

The song title was chosen for its literary ambiguity, evoking a sense of anticipation and uncertainty about something yet to happen. Sakamoto commented: "I wanted a literary title, like something you would see on a novel, that doesn't say too much and leaves room for interpretation. [The song] starts with the phrase "waking to the sound of rain," singing about a dawn that is still far off, but whether that dawn is good or bad is unclear. It is both anxiety and anticipation—nothing has happened yet, but something is about to. That is the feeling behind the title."

== Critical reception ==
In a review for Rock'On Japan, music writer Hiroko Goto described "Mada Tōku ni Ari" as a "dramatic, piano- and string-driven" song in which Sakamoto's "powerful vocals" shone, and praised the double A-side single as a whole for its multifaceted nature, describing both "Mada Tōku ni Iru" and "Un_mute" as "breathtaking, with [Sakamoto's] resolute voice cutting through fantastical, weighty soundscapes tailored to each anime's world."

== Commercial performance ==
"Mada Tōku ni Iru" (Note: As the double A-side single "Mada Tōku ni Iru/Un_mute.") debuted at number 11 on the Oricon Weekly Singles Chart, selling 5,285 copies on its first week. The single charted for six weeks, with reported sales totaling 6,361 copies.

== Track listing ==
Mada Tōku ni Iru/Un_mute - CD single
No.	Title	Lyrics	Music	Arrangement	Length
1.	"Mada Tōku ni Iru" (まだ遠くにいる)	Maaya Sakamoto	Umuya Aneta; Sayuri Horishita	Aneta	5:14
2.	"Un_mute"	Yuho Iwasato	Sira	Shin Kono	4:57
3.	"Konna Hi ga Kuru Nante" (こんな日が来るなんて)	Sakamoto	Sakamoto	Katsutoshi Kitagawa; Acane_Madder	4:28
4.	"Mada Tōku ni Iru" (Instrumental)				5:14
5.	"Un_mute" (Instrumental)				4:55
6.	"Konna Hi ga Kuru Nante" (Instrumental)				4:23
Total length:					29:11

== Personnel ==
Credits adapted from the liner notes of the "Mada Tōku ni Iru/Un_mute" CD single.

- Maaya Sakamoto – songwriting, vocals, backing vocals, production
- Umuya Aneta – songwriting, arrangements, programming
- Sayuri Horishita – songwriting
- Yasuo Sano – drums
- Hitoshi Watanabe – bass
- Susumu Nishimura – guitar
- Kousuke Munemoto – acoustic piano
- Matarou Misawa – percussion
- Koichiro Muroya Strings – strings
- Hiromitsu Takasu – recording & mixing
- Hiroshi Kawasaki – mastering
- Masao Fukuda – A&R direction
- Shirō Sasaki – executive production

== Charts ==
Chart performance for "Mada Tōku ni Iru"
Chart (2023)	Peak position
Japan Singles (Oricon)	11
Japan Top Singles Sales (Billboard Japan)	9
