= Dakishimete (Maaya Sakamoto song) =

- Limited edition cover

Single by Maaya Sakamoto
- Language: Japanese
- B-side: "Once Upon a Time"
- Released: January 15, 2024
- Studio: Victor Studio; MIT Studio
- Genre: J-pop; anime song
- Length: 4:49
- Label: FlyingDog
- Songwriter: Senri Oe
- Producer: Maaya Sakamoto

Maaya Sakamoto singles chronology
"Mada Tōku ni Iru" / "Un_mute" (2023)	"Dakishimete" (2024)	"Nina" (2024)

Music video
- "Dakishimete" on YouTube

"Dakishimete" (抱きしめて; lit. 'Embrace') is a song by Japanese voice actress and singer Maaya Sakamoto. Written by musician Senri Oe, this song marks the first collaboration between these two artists. The song served as the ending theme for the second season of the Wowow original anime series The Fire Hunter. It was released as a digital single on January 15, 2024, and on physical formats on April 3, 2024, by FlyingDog.

== Background and release ==
"Dakishimete" was written as the ending theme for the second season of The Fire Hunter, a fantasy anime adapted from Rieko Hinata's novel, set in a post-apocalyptic world where humanity has lost the ability to use fire. The song was conceived at the request of the series' director, who envisioned an ending theme that felt "comforting," "gentle," and "endearing," contrasting with the more intense tone of the story and the first season's ending theme, "Mada Tōku ni Iru." Sakamoto initially found this concept surprising, as she was aware of the show's serious atmosphere as one of its voice actors, but interpreted the request as a call for a classic pop ballad that could transcend generations and offer a sense of warmth and security amid the narrative's escalating tension. The idea to approach Senri Oe, a pop singer known for numerous hits in Japan during 1980s, and currently active as a jazz pianist in New York City, originated during discussions among the production staff for the second season of The Fire Hunter, as they sought a composer who could realize the director's vision for the ending theme. The more they considered Oe's style, the more they felt he was ideally suited for the project. Although Oe resides overseas, the team decided to reach out to him, uncertain whether he would accept. To her delight, Oe agreed to participate, and the two artists met remotely to discuss the song's concept and lyrical direction.

Sakamoto initially intended to write the lyrics for "Dakishimete" herself, as she had done for "Mada Tōku ni Iru." Having read the entire novel that inspired the series, she had a clear understanding of its themes and a strong vision for the lyrics she wanted to express. However, she was simultaneously involved in the production of her album Kioku no Toshokan, which left her with limited time. Recognizing her constraints, Sakamoto decided to entrust both the lyrics and music to Oe. Oe described his creative approach as aiming for a "warm, resilient song that hints at a hopeful tomorrow" following the main story's tension. Drawing from Sakamoto's suggestion for a gentle ending, he wrote "Dakishimete" to evoke "a childlike belief in the unseen" and the fleeting sense of wonder adults sometimes recall. He likened the song's structure to a haiku—concise yet emotionally complete. The final arrangement, developed with arranger Shin Kono, centered on piano and soft acoustic instruments such as oboe, flute, clarinet, and cello to preserve the warmth of Oe's original piano-and-vocal demo without leaning on a grand string sound. The song was created remotely, with Sakamoto recording it in Tokyo, while Oe was in New York.

"Dakishimete" was first announced as the second ending theme for The Fire Hunter in December 2023, and was released as a digital single on January 15, 2024, to coincide with the anime's second season premiere.

The physical single was released on April 3, 2024, in two formats: a regular CD edition and a limited edition including a Blu-ray disc with live performances from the concert from Sakamoto's tour for promoting her album Kioku no Toshokan held on January 2, 2024, at the rescheduled Tokyo show. The physical single also included the song "Once Upon a Time," which was co-written by Sakamoto and Sira, a singer-songwriter who previously collaborated with her single "Un_mute." A live recording of "Dakishimete" from the Kioku no Toshokan tour was also included on the single.

== Composition and themes ==
"Dakishimete" is a ballad, described by Sakamoto as a "a very gentle track", in stark contrast to "Mada Tōku ni Iru." While "Mada Tōku ni Iru" was envisioned as "powerful track" designed to inspire the anime's characters during the first season of The Fire Hunter, the idea of "Dakishimete" was born from a scene where the young characters of the story finally find a safe place to sleep or eat, reflecting the enduring will to live. According to Sakamoto, its lyrics and melody aim to convey warmth, resilience, and the quiet strength found in moments of rest and safety, and Sakamoto viewed it as a "sanctuary-like" space within the story, offering emotional refuge after the series' intense and often grim developments. Oe, in turn, described the song as a "warm, resilient" piece that hints at a hopeful tomorrow and evokes a "childlike belief in the unseen." Together, they aimed to create a song that feels like a gentle embrace—one that simultaneously offers and seeks comfort. Sakamoto further connected the song's themes to real-world issues, expressing her desire to comfort children living in fear amidst conflict, emphasizing the importance of holding onto hope. She related the song's warmth to the desire for safety and comfort in uncertain times, a sentiment she said resonated more deeply since becoming a parent.

== Music video ==
The short version of the music video for "Dakishimete" was published on YouTube on February 3, 2024. Directed by Yasuyuki Yamaguchi, who also worked on Sakamoto's previous music video "Nai Mono Nedari", the video combines live performance footage of the song with scenes depicting the morning light of Tokyo and the daily lives of its residents.

== Commercial performance ==
"Dakishimete" debuted at number 12 on the Oricon Weekly Singles Chart, selling 4,184 copies on its first week. The single charted for four weeks, with reported sales totaling 4,794 copies.

== Track listing ==
Dakishimete – digital single
No.	Title	Writer(s)	Arrangement	Length
1.	"Dakishimete" (抱きしめて)	Senri Oe	Shin Kono	4:49
Total length:				4:49

Dakishimete – CD single
No.	Title	Lyrics	Music	Arrangement	Length
1.	"Dakishimete"	Senri Oe	Oe	Shin Kono	4:49
2.	"Once Upon a Time"	Maaya Sakamoto	Sira	Ryuji Yamamoto	4:47
3.	"Dakishimete" (live 2024 ver.)			Kento Ohgiya	5:07
4.	"Dakishimete" (Instrumental)				4:09
5.	"Once Upon a Time" (Instrumental)				4:40
Total length:					24:11

== Personnel ==
Credits adapted from the liner notes of the "Dakishimete" CD single.

- Maaya Sakamoto – vocals, backing vocals, production
- Senri Oe – songwriting
- Shin Kono – arrangements, acoustic piano, programming
- Yasuo Sano – drums
- Hitoshi Watanabe – bass
- Hideto Goto – acoustic guitar
- Misaki Hatori – flute
- Ami Kaneko – oboe
- Hidehito Naka – clarinet
- Ayano Kasahara – cello
- Hiromitsu Takasu – recording & mixing engineering
- Hiroshi Kawasaki – mastering
- Masao Fukuda – A&R direction
- Kazuharu Masuda – A&R direction
- Shirō Sasaki – executive production

== Charts ==
=== Weekly charts ===
Weekly chart performance for "Dakishimete"
Chart (2024)	Peak position
Japan (Oricon)	12
Japan Anime Singles (Oricon)	4
Japan Top Singles Sales (Billboard Japan)	14
Japan Download Songs (Billboard Japan)	53

=== Monthly charts ===
Monthly chart performance for "Dakishimete"
Chart (2024)	Position
Japan (Oricon)	47
