= Kioku no Toshokan =

Studio album by Maaya Sakamoto
- Released: May 31, 2023
- Genre: J-pop; Alternative pop; Anime song
- Length: 54:52
- Label: FlyingDog
- Producer: Maaya Sakamoto

Maaya Sakamoto chronology
Duets (2021)	Kioku no Toshokan (2023)	M30: Your Best (2025)

Singles from Kioku no Toshokan
- 1. "Sumire" / "Kotoba ni Dekinai" Released: May 25, 2022; 2. "Mada Tōku ni Iru" / "Un_mute" Released: January 25, 2023

Kioku no Toshokan (記憶の図書館; lit. 'Library of Memories') is the eleventh studio album of Japanese voice actress and singer Maaya Sakamoto, released on March 17, 2021, by FlyingDog.

== Background and release ==
Similar to her previous studio album, Kyō Dake no Ongaku, Kioku no Toshokan revolves around a conceptual theme, this time centered on a fictional "library of memories," a repository that manages the memories of people worldwide. The narrative, envisioned by Sakamoto, follows a young boy tasked with collecting "discarded memories." with the music of the album representing the emotions and stories spilling out when memory boxes are opened. Sakamoto drew inspiration for Kioku no Toshokan from her personal experiences as a parent, after giving birth to her first daughter in 2022. She reflected on the paradox of forgetting early childhood yet recognizing its profound impact on personality, leading to musings about the persistence of forgotten memories as part of one’s identity. This introspection led to the development of a concept story centered around a "library of memories," where a boy collects discarded memories and, on a whim, returns a memory box to its owner. Sakamoto shared this narrative with the album’s contributing songwriters to guide the creative process.

The album includes eight newly recorded songs written specifically for the concept, alongside four tie-in singles from various anime series. Sakamoto and her director curated the lineup of album collaborators for the album by discussing artists they admired and recent musical interests, aiming to blend familiar collaborators with new voices from younger generations. Sakamoto sought to balance her own songwriting with contributions from others, intentionally reducing her lyrical input to incorporate fresh perspectives. The album’s creation was also shaped by Sakamoto’s desire to avoid repeating past successes, pushing for new musical challenges to maintain creative growth. The involvement of Chilldspot was suggested by Sakamoto's director as a band they've been into at that time, while she suggested involving the band Cero. Initially unaware of which Cero member wrote their songs, Sakamoto revisited band member Yu Arauchi’s solo album Śisei (2021) and felt that its style perfectly suited the "library of memories" narrative. Upon asking for their involvement and receiving the demo, Sakamoto was immediately captivated, noting its resonance with the boy in her story, and proposed to the director that this become leading track of the record.

Younger talents brought by Sakamoto to work on the word include Anna Takeuchi. Sakamoto met Takeuchi through Kohei Dojima during the recording of her album Duets, after she found out she was the voice behind the demo that Dojima sent to her. Shohei Koga of the band Yourness, whom she previously worked with for her 2020 single "Yakudō", was also asked to participate. She proposed their collaboration with long-time collaborator lyricist Yuho Iwasato, intrigued by the potential of the pairing of a veteran with a young band. Upon receiving the demo, Sakamoto found it challenging, humorously questioning, "Who’s supposed to sing this?" due to its modern structure, packed lyrics, non-repeating melodies, and rising key changes. Despite the generational gap between Iwasato and Yourness, both parties were thrilled with the collaboration, and Sakamoto appreciated the unique result of this cross-generational pairing.

Tricot participated in the track "Ichido Kiri de Ii," which Sakamoto described as a unique and standout addition due to its distinct post-rock sound. The collaboration stemmed from her director’s long-standing desire to work with them, a band Sakamoto was already a fan of, though she initially wondered how her vocals would fit into their signature style, which thrives on the interplay of their four members, Ikkyu Nakashima’s lyrics, and her distinctive voice, but found the collaboration thrilling and successful. She was impressed by their creative energy during recording, noting the track’s complex odd time signatures. The lyrics came quickly, flowing naturally with tricot’s organic rhythm, aligning with the album’s theme of bold, new collaborations. The track "Anything You Wanna Be," composed for the album by Hiyune of Chilldspot, was praised by Sakamoto for its mature, minimalist style, which she loved instantly. Amazed by the young band’s sophistication, she saw her younger self in Kon’s defiant lyrics about seeking identity, finding them endearing. The collaboration felt fresh and connected despite the age gap.

As for musicians who had previously worked with Sakamoto, she asked them to try something completely different for Kioku no Toshokan. With Katsuyoshi Kitagawa of Round Table, she exchanged multiple demos to finally settle on a version that felt right, as she explicitly wanted a deliberate departure from the upbeat, bright, and energetic live anthems. As to Kohei Dojima, with whom she requested an acoustic style for a fresh take. Dojima’s swift delivery and unique lyric placement, distinct from her own, impressed her, embodying the joy of others’ contributions and aligning with the album’s theme of new creative voices. For "Kagami no Naka de," Sakamoto paired Shintaro Sakamoto and Keiichi Tomita, and described the resulting product as a track with "gentle, floating, and bright" melody, but with "introspective, slightly eerie" lyrics, also praising Shintaro Sakamoto's skills as a lyricist, commenting they were no match to hers.

The album also includes previously released songs "Sumire," "Kotoba ni Dekinai," "Mada Tōku ni Iru," and "Un_mute." Sakamoto commented that she faced challenges in packaging the record as a cohesive concept album due to the density of these pre-released tracks and initial uncertainties about their thematic fit. Unlike her past albums, which featured entirely new material, this album's mix of old and new songs raised concerns about potential contradictions. However, Sakamoto found an organic connection through the theme of "reviving memory fragments from various people." She emphasized the personal significance of "Sumire," noting it was a must-include track planned as the album's closer from the outset, expressing confidence that it would ultimately tie the album's diverse elements together.

The album was released in two formats: a standard edition and a limited edition. The limited first edition includes a Blu-ray Disc featuring music videos for three tracks: "Sumire," "Mada Tōku ni Iru," and "Un_Mute." These music videos were made available commercially for the first time with this release.

== Composition and themes ==
The album explores themes of personal reflection, identity, and the tension between individuality and societal conformity. Tracks like "Nai Mono Nedari" delve into yearning for what’s missing, while "discord" expresses feelings of alienation in a seemingly perfect world, reflecting Sakamoto’s own frustrations with forced conformity in daily life. Other songs, such as "Kagami no Naka de," evoke a surreal blend of reality and fantasy, capturing moments of self-estrangement.

== Commercial performance ==
Kioku no Toshokan debuted at number 7 on the Oricon Weekly Albums chart, selling 7,625 copies on its first week.

== Track listing ==
No.	Title	Lyrics	Music	Arrangement	Length
1.	"Nai Mono Nedari" (ないものねだり, lit. 'Asking for the Impossible')	Maaya Sakamoto	Yu Arauchi	Arauchi	4:05
2.	"Discord"	Sakamoto	Anna Takeuchi	Daisuke Kawaguchi	4:02
3.	"Time Traveller" (タイムトラベラー)	Sakamoto	Katsutoshi Kitagawa	Kitagawa	5:30
4.	"Un_mute"	Yuho Iwasato	Sira	Shin Kono	4:56
5.	"Taion" (体温, lit. 'Body Temperature')	Iwasato	Shohei Koga	Koga; Kono	4:18
6.	"Ichido Kiri de Ii" (一度きりでいい, lit. 'Just Once is Fine')	Sakamoto	Tricot	Tricot	4:13
7.	"Mada Tōku ni Iru" (まだ遠くにいる, lit. 'Still Far Away')	Sakamoto	Umuya Aneta; Sayuri Horishita	Aneta	5:13
8.	"Kotoba ni Dekinai" (言葉にできない, lit. 'Can't Put it Into Words')	Sakamoto	Sakamoto	H-Wonder	4:55
9.	"Anything You Wanna Be"	Sakamoto	Hiyune	Kohei Dojima	5:08
10.	"Kūchū Teien" (空中庭園, lit. 'Aerial Garden')	Dojima	Dojima	Dojima	4:22
11.	"Kagami no Naka de" (鏡の中で, lit. 'Inside the Mirror')	Shintaro Sakamoto	Keiichi Tomita	Tomita	4:16
12.	"Sumire" (菫, lit. 'Violet')	Sakamoto	Shigeru Kishida	Kishida; Kento Ohgiya	3:55
Total length:					54:52

== Charts ==
Chart performance for Kioku no Toshokan
Chart (2023)	Peak position
Japan (Oricon)	7
Japan Hot Albums (Billboard Japan)	7
