= Dokuhaku =

- FGO edition cover

Single by Maaya Sakamoto
- Language: Japanese
- A-side: "Yakudō" (double A-side)
- Released: December 9, 2020
- Studio: Victor Studio
- Genre: J-pop; Anime song
- Length: 4:42
- Label: FlyingDog
- Composer: Takahito Uchisawa (Androp)
- Lyricist: Maaya Sakamoto
- Producer: Maaya Sakamoto

Maaya Sakamoto singles chronology
"Clover" (2020)	"Dokuhaku" / "Yakudō" (2020)	"Sumire" / "Kotoba ni Dekinai" (2022)

Music video
- "Dokuhaku" on YouTube

"Dokuhaku" (独白; lit. 'Monologue') is a song by Japanese singer-songwriter and voice actress Maaya Sakamoto. Co-written by Sakamoto and Takahito Uchisawa of Androp, the song served as the theme song for the first part of the animated film Fate/Grand Order: Divine Realm of the Round Table Camelot, and was released as a double A-side single along with "Yakudō" on September 25, 2020, by FlyingDog.

== Background and release ==
Since 2015, Sakamoto has been deeply involved with Fate/Grand Order, contributing theme songs that have become integral to its world, including "Shikisai" (2015), "Gyakkō" (2018). In March 2020, during a special program aired on Abema TV about the movie Fate/Grand Order The Movie: Divine Realm of the Round Table Camelot, it was announced that Sakamoto would contribute with the theme song for the movie. While also voicing Leonardo da Vinci in the film, she was confirmed to perform the theme song for the first part, while Mamoru Miyano was announced as the performer for the theme song of the second part, Paladin; Agateram, with lyrics for both songs written by Sakamoto. She then expressed her desire to create a song that allows audiences to "immerse themselves deeply in the afterglow while watching the end credits." In August 2020, the third promotional video for the film was released during the special broadcast Fate/Grand Order Chaldea Broadcasting Station 5th Anniversary SP: Under the Same Sky. The trailer featured the first public unveiling of the song.

In September 2020, it was announced that "Dokuhaku" would be released as part of the double A-side single "Dokuhaku-Yakudou," alongside the track "Yakudō", which served as the theme song for the latter half of the second part of the smartphone game Fate/Grand Order. The single was stylized as "Dokuhaku ⇔ Yakudō", with the "⇔" officially represented as a double-headed arrow, symbolizing the complementary relationship between the two tracks. The single was released on December 9, 2020, in three formats: the FGO edition (limited and standard) featuring artwork illustrated by Takashi Takeuchi, and the Maaya edition featuring Sakamoto on the cover. The FGO edition includes an acoustic arrangement of the song "Gyakkō" as the b-side, while the Maaya edition includes the song "Itsuka Tabi ni Deru Hi", which was written and composed by Sakamoto. Additionally, the FGO limited edition includes a Blu-ray featuring the complete recording of the streaming live event Maaya Sakamoto × Fate/Grand Order 5th Anniversary Special Live, held in August 2020. The live performance included "Dokuhaku" alongside other tracks such as "Shikisai," "Gyakkō," and "Yakudō."

== Composition and themes ==
"Dokuhaku" was written by Maaya Sakamoto, with music composed and arranged by Takahito Uchisawa, marking their second collaboration since the 2014 single "Replica." The strings arrangement was handled by Uchisawa and Toru Ishitsuka. "Dokuhaku" was crafted to align with the narrative of part one of the Fate/Grand Order The Movie: Divine Realm of the Round Table Camelot, which concludes its first part on a harsh, unresolved note. Sakamoto noted the challenge of writing a song for a story that pauses mid-narrative, aiming to evoke a sense of unease and anticipation for the second part. Following discussions with the director, Kei Suezawa, and Kinoko Nasu, it was decided early on to write the song's lyrics from Bedivere's perspective. Regarding this, Sakamoto commented: "Since the film is split into two parts, I prioritized making the song closely align with the final scene of the first part. The first part concludes with Bedivere's monologue, and I wanted to capture the audience's feelings of, "Why does it end here?"... as well as Bedivere's complex emotions of sorrow and determination." The director, Kei Suezawa, requested a song that would start quietly, transitioning into a provocative tone in the latter half to build excitement for the continuation. Sakamoto described the song as a mission to meet these complex demands, resulting in a track that blends classical and rock elements, creating a chaotic, large-scale sound. She proposed incorporating a grand string arrangement and a medieval atmosphere to reflect the film's setting, which Uchisawa executed distinctively, diverging from his usual style with Androp.

Sakamoto described the "FGO-ness" of her songs as a blend of complex, high-energy soundscapes with strings and electronic elements, coupled with a narrative tone that balances despair and perseverance, culminating in a positive, forward-driving energy. However, for "Dokuhaku", Sakamoto took a novel approach, intentionally avoiding her typical tendency to include redemptive or forward-looking themes. She embraced raw emotional outpouring, titling the song "Dokuhaku" (Monologue) to reflect an inner turmoil, focusing on despair and impulsiveness without resolution, deferring hope to the second part's theme song by Mamoru Miyano.

== Track listing ==
All lyrics are written by Maaya Sakamoto.

Dokuhaku/Yakudō – CD single (FGO edition)
No.	Title	Music	Arrangement	Length
1.	"Dokuhaku" (独白)	Takahito Uchisawa (Androp)	Uchisawa	4:49
2.	"Yakudō" (躍動)	Shohei Koga (Yourness)	Yourness	4:10
3.	"Gyakkō" (逆光) (unplugged session)	Ichiyo Izawa	Kento Ohgiya	5:43
4.	"Dokuhaku" (Instrumental)			4:42
5.	"Yakudō" (Instrumental)			4:07
Total length:				23:24

== Personnel ==
Credits adapted from the liner notes of the "Dokuhaku/Yakudō" CD single.

- Maaya Sakamoto – songwriting, vocals, backing vocals, production
- Takahito Uchisawa – songwriting, arrangements, strings arrangements
- Toru Ishitsuka – strings arrangements
- Chihiro Kamijo – drums
- Ichiro Yoshida – bass
- Takayuki Sasaki – guitar
- Jun Murayama – piano
- Koichiro Muroya Strings – strings
- Hiromitsu Takasu – recording & mixing
- Hiroshi Kawasaki – mastering
- Masao Fukuda – A&R direction
- Shirō Sasaki – executive production

== Charts ==
=== Weekly charts ===
Weekly chart performance for "Dokuhaku/Yakudō"
Chart (2020)	Peak position
Japan (Oricon)	6
Japan Anime Singles (Oricon)	2
Japan Top Singles Sales (Billboard Japan)	6

Weekly chart performance for "Dokuhaku"
Chart (2020)	Peak position
Japan Digital Singles (Oricon)	16
Japan Hot 100 (Billboard Japan)	31
Japan Hot Animation (Billboard Japan)	5
Japan Download Songs (Billboard Japan)	13

=== Monthly charts ===
Monthly chart performance for "Dokuhaku/Yakudō"
Chart (2020)	Position
Japan Singles (Oricon)	20
Japan Anime Singles (Oricon)	5
