= Sumire (song) =

- Standard edition cover

Single by Maaya Sakamoto

from the album Kioku no Toshokan
- Language: Japanese
- A-side: "Kotoba ni Dekinai" (double A-side)
- B-side: "Senri no Michi" (studio live)
- Released: May 25, 2022
- Studio: Victor Studio
- Genre: J-pop; anime song
- Length: 3:57
- Label: FlyingDog
- Composer: Shigeru Kishida (Quruli)
- Lyricist: Maaya Sakamoto
- Producer: Maaya Sakamoto

Maaya Sakamoto singles chronology
"Dokuhaku" / "Yakudō" (2020)	"Sumire" / "Kotoba ni Dekinai" (2022)	"Mada Tōku ni Iru" / "Un_mute" (2023)

Music video
- "Sumire" on YouTube

"Sumire" (菫; lit. 'Violet') is a song by Japanese singer-songwriter and voice actress Maaya Sakamoto. Co-written by Sakamoto and Shigeru Kishida of the band Quruli, the song served as the opening theme for the television anime series Deaimon, and was released as a double A-side single along with "Kotoba ni Dekinai" on May 25, 2022, by FlyingDog.

== Background and release ==
“Sumire” marks the first collaboration between Sakamoto and Shigeru Kishida of Quruli. Sakamoto, a long-time fan of Quruli, reached out to Kishida to compose the song after learning that the anime Deaimon was set in Kyoto, Kishida's hometown, and that the original author, Rin Asano, was also a Quruli fan. Sakamoto described the collaboration as serendipitous, given that both she and Quruli began their music careers around the same time in 1996, and she had long hoped to work with them.

Sakamoto provided Kishida with minimal direction, requesting a ballad in the vein of some of Quruli's past works, while also incorporating requests from the anime's production team. Kishida, who expressed a desire to write more songs for others, found the process freeing compared to writing for Quruli, where he typically writes for his own voice. Due to the constraints of the COVID-19 pandemic, the two were unable to meet in person during the production process. Kishida crafted a melody suited to Sakamoto’s voice, which he noted the key was slightly higher than his usual compositions. The song's arrangement, handled by Kishida and Kento Ohgiya, features warm live instruments with intricate guitar and synth elements, described by Kishida as a “fluffy futon with a spring inside” due to its subtle syncopation and harmonic details. The recording process was split between Tokyo and Kyoto.

The song was released as a double A-side single along with "Kotoba ni Dekinai" (the ending theme for the third season of Ascendance of a Bookworm), in two formats: a limited first edition (CD + Blu-ray) and a regular edition (CD only). The limited edition includes a bonus Blu-ray featuring footage from the final day of Sakamoto's IDS! presents Acoustic Live & Talk 2020 performance at Zepp Tokyo. To celebrate the single's release, a three-day theatrical screening, Maaya Sakamoto Acoustic Live & Talk 2020 (5.1ch Surround Edition), was held in six Japanese cities: Sapporo, Sendai, Tokyo, Nagoya, Osaka, and Fukuoka. The screening featured a specially edited version of the 2020 performance with 5.1ch surround sound, and attendees received an original message card from Sakamoto. The b-side to the single is a studio live version of "Senri no Michi", created to celebrate the thousandth episode of Sakamoto's radio program Vitamin M.

== Composition and themes ==
"Sumire" is a ballad, a departure from the often flashy requirements of anime opening themes, crafted to suit the human drama of Deaimon, which focuses on themes of passing down traditions and forming connections beyond blood ties. The lyrics for "Sumire" were written with a haiku-like approach, stripping down words to evoke imagery and scenery without being overly explicit. Sakamoto aimed for a timeless quality, blending the anime’s narrative with her own emotions, capturing both a youthful, adventurous perspective and a reflective, adult viewpoint. Kishida praised the lyrics for reflecting Sakamoto’s 25-year artistic intuition, aligning with the strength of Deaimon’s protagonist, Nagomu.

== Critical reception ==
In a review for Rockin'On Japan, music writer Sayako Oki praised "Sumire" for reflecting Sakamoto’s artistic stance, commenting "Sakamoto’s voice exudes elegant refinement while evoking a rustic closeness, like friends standing shoulder to shoulder." She highlighted how Sakamoto's lyrics resonated with the song’s gentle opening with piano and band sounds, to its dramatic midsection with strings and synths, noting that the track’s meticulous details and expansive melody result in a compelling and elegant pop song.

== Track listing ==
All lyrics are written by Maaya Sakamoto.

Sumire/Kotoba ni Dekinai - CD single
No.	Title	Music	Arrangement	Length
1.	"Sumire" (菫)	Shigeru Kishida	Kishida; Kento Ohgiya	3:57
2.	"Kotoba ni Dekinai" (言葉にできない)	Maaya Sakamoto	H-Wonder	4:56
3.	"Senri no Michi" (千里の道) (studio live)	Sakamoto	Kento Ohgiya	3:26
4.	"Sumire" (Instrumental)			3:57
5.	"Kotoba ni Dekinai" (Instrumental)			4:53
Total length:				21:09

== Personnel ==
Credits adapted from the liner notes of the "Sumire/Kotoba ni Dekinai" CD single.

- Maaya Sakamoto – songwriting, vocals, backing vocals, production
- Shigeru Kishida – songwriting, electric guitar, programming, arrangements
- Kento Ohgiya – acoustic piano, organ, arrangements
- Nobuo Eguchi – drums
- Manabu Chigasaki – bass
- Kazuma Sotozono – acoustic guitar
- Koichiro Muroya Strings – strings
- Hiromitsu Takasu – recording & mixing
- Hiroshi Kawasaki – mastering
- Masao Fukuda – A&R direction
- Shirō Sasaki – executive production

== Charts ==
=== Weekly charts ===
Weekly chart performance for "Sumire"
Chart (2022)	Peak position
Japan Singles (Oricon) (Note: As the double A-side single "Sumire/Kotoba ni Dekinai.")	12
Japan Digital Singles (Oricon)	25
Japan Top Singles Sales (Billboard Japan)	13
Japan Hot Animation (Billboard Japan)	14
Japan Download Songs (Billboard Japan)	24

=== Monthly charts ===
Monthly chart performance for "Sumire"
Chart (2022)	Position
Japan (Oricon)	35
