= Dakishimete =

Dakishimete may refer to:

- "Dakishimete!", a 1995 song by Arisa Mizuki
- "Dakishimete", a 2010 song by Ryuichi Kawamura
- "Dakishimete" (Maaya Sakamoto song), a 2024 song by Maaya Sakamoto
- "Dakishimete", a 2024 song by Kaf and Sōshi Sakiyama
