= Kotoba ni Dekinai =

- Limited edition cover

Single by Maaya Sakamoto

from the album Kioku no Toshokan
- Language: Japanese
- A-side: "Sumire" (double A-side)
- B-side: "Senri no Michi" (studio live)
- Released: May 25, 2022
- Genre: J-pop; Anime song
- Length: 3:57
- Label: FlyingDog
- Songwriter: Maaya Sakamoto
- Producer: Maaya Sakamoto

Maaya Sakamoto singles chronology
"Dokuhaku" / "Yakudō" (2020)	"Kotoba ni Dekinai" / "Sumire" (2022)	"Mada Tōku ni Iru" / "Un_mute" (2023)

Music video
- "Kotoba ni Dekinai" on YouTube

"Kotoba ni Dekinai" (言葉にできない; lit. 'Can't Put it Into Words') is a song by Japanese singer-songwriter and voice actress Maaya Sakamoto. Written, composed, and produced by Sakamoto herself, the song served as the ending theme for the third season of the television anime series Ascendance of a Bookworm, and was released as a double A-side single along with "Sumire" on May 25, 2022, by FlyingDog.

== Background and release ==
"Kotoba ni Dekinai" was written specifically for the third season of Ascendance of a Bookworm, an adaptation of the light novel series by Miya Kazuki. Sakamoto drew inspiration from a key moment in the story where "a young girl leaves her hometown and steps into new independence." Since Ascendance of a Bookworm is a fantasy anime, rather than evoking everyday Japanese life, Sakamoto aimed to capture the scenery of some far-off country and, in this same line, she wanted to drift away from electronic pop elements, and instead aimed for a sound centered around analog instruments to immerse listeners in the anime's otherworldly atmosphere. Sakamoto reached out to long-time collaborator Hiroki Wada (H-Wonder) to handle the arrangement of the song, marking this as the first he time he would arrange one of Sakamoto's own compositions. He contributed with the acoustic texture and the strings with a fiddle-like quality, giving the track a Celtic music vibe. Regarding Wada's involvement, Sakamoto commented: "It was the first time for me to have one of my songs arranged by Wada, and it felt very special. Back when I debuted, we met as fellow singers, so it's amazing to think that the day would come when that person would arrange my music."

The song was released as a double A-side single along with "Sumire", in two formats: a limited first edition (CD + Blu-ray) and a regular edition (CD only). The limited edition includes a bonus Blu-ray featuring footage from the final day of Sakamoto's IDS! presents Acoustic Live & Talk 2020 performance at Zepp Tokyo. To celebrate the single's release, a three-day theatrical screening, Maaya Sakamoto Acoustic Live & Talk 2020 (5.1ch Surround Edition), was held in six Japanese cities: Sapporo, Sendai, Tokyo, Nagoya, Osaka, and Fukuoka. The screening featured a specially edited version of the 2020 performance with 5.1ch surround sound, and attendees received an original message card from Sakamoto. The b-side to the single is a studio live version of "Senri no Michi", created to celebrate the thousandth episode of Sakamoto's radio program Vitamin M.

== Composition and themes ==
Musically, "Kotoba ni Dekinai" blends gentle acoustic guitar with fiddle-like strings and subtle choral harmonies, creating a warm, introspective tone. Sakamoto noted the Celtic-inspired strings in H-Wonder arrangement as a recurring motif in her discography, reflecting her affinity for ethereal, folk-tinged sounds. Lyrically, the song captures the ambiguity of farewells and personal growth. Key phrases like "Watashi dakedo, watashi dakara" ("I'm me, but because I'm me") encapsulate a message of tentative resolve: acknowledging one's imperfections while embracing the necessity of moving forward. Explaining this, Sakamoto commented: "It's not about having confidence, but about believing there must be something you're meant to do – even if you don't know what it is yet – and taking that first step forward." Sakamoto further explained that the lyrics evoke the reluctance to verbalize deep emotions—such as gratitude or goodbye—to loved ones, opting instead for silent action, adding: "It is as if there is a more fitting word you want to say, but you cannot find it, so in the end you say nothing. I tried to express that feeling in the lyrics." This ties directly to the anime's themes of familial bonds and reluctant departures, mirroring real-life transitions like high school graduations.

== Music video ==
A short version of the music video for "Kotoba ni Dekinai" premiered on YouTube on April 20, 2022. Directed with input from the Ascendance of a Bookworm anime production team, it incorporates key scenes from Ascendance of a Bookworm season three, focusing on the series' protagonist Myne's moment of setting out on her journey.

== Critical reception ==
In a review for Rockin'On Japan, music writer Sayako Oki praised the single for reflecting Sakamoto's artistic stance, commenting "Sakamoto's voice exudes elegant refinement while evoking a rustic closeness, like friends standing shoulder to shoulder." She highlighted "Kotoba ni Dekinai" for its delicate portrayal of leaving family, describing it as imbued with a warmth that "gently melts away anxiety and fear."

== Track listing ==
All lyrics are written by Maaya Sakamoto.

Sumire/Kotoba ni Dekinai – CD single
No.	Title	Music	Arrangement	Length
1.	"Sumire" (菫)	Shigeru Kishida	Kishida; Kento Ohgiya	3:57
2.	"Kotoba ni Dekinai" (言葉にできない)	Maaya Sakamoto	H-Wonder	4:56
3.	"Senri no Michi" (千里の道) (studio live)	Sakamoto	Kento Ohgiya	3:26
4.	"Sumire" (Instrumental)			3:57
5.	"Kotoba ni Dekinai" (Instrumental)			4:53
Total length:				21:09

== Personnel ==
Credits adapted from the liner notes of the "Sumire/Kotoba ni Dekinai" CD single.

- Maaya Sakamoto – songwriting, vocals, backing vocals, production
- H-Wonder – programming, arrangements
- Hitoshi Watanabe – bass, mandolin, bouzouki
- Hitoshi Konno Strings – strings
- Hiromitsu Takasu – recording & mixing
- Hiroshi Kawasaki – mastering
- Masao Fukuda – A&R direction
- Shirō Sasaki – executive production
