= Yakudō =

- Digital single cover

Single by Maaya Sakamoto
- Language: Japanese
- A-side: "Dokuhaku" (double A-side)
- B-side: "Itsuka Tabi ni Deru Hi"
- Released: August 11, 2020
- Studio: Victor Studio
- Genre: J-pop; pop rock; anime song
- Length: 4:42
- Label: FlyingDog
- Composer: Shohei Koga (Yourness)
- Lyricist: Maaya Sakamoto
- Producer: Maaya Sakamoto

Maaya Sakamoto singles chronology
"Clover" (2020)	"Yakudō" / "Dokuhaku" (2020)	"Sumire" / "Kotoba ni Dekinai" (2022)

"Yakudō" (躍動, Yakudō; lit. 'Vitality') is a song by Japanese singer-songwriter and voice actress Maaya Sakamoto, co-written by Sakamoto and Shohei Koga of Yourness. It was first released as a digital single on August 11, 2020, and subsequently as a double A-side single along with "Dokuhaku" on September 25, 2020, by FlyingDog.

== Background and release ==
Since 2015, Sakamoto has been deeply involved with Fate/Grand Order (FGO), contributing theme songs that have become integral to its world, including "Shikisai" (2015), "Gyakkō" (2018). In 2020, coinciding with Sakamoto's 25th anniversary in the music industry, she continued her deep involvement with the Fate/Grand Order franchise.

In May of that year, during a special live broadcast of Fate/Grand Order on YouTube, it was announced that Sakamoto would perform the theme song "Yakudō" for the second part of the Fate/Grand Order game, following "Gyakkō". On July 30, 2020, coinciding with the fifth anniversary of the Android release of the game, "Yakudō" was unveiled as a surprise within the game, being showcased in a roughly one-and-a-half-minute opening movie for the second part of FGO's storyline. On August 11, 2020, the song was released digitally on streaming platforms.

In September 2020, it was announced that "Yakudō" would be released as part of a double A-side single alongside the track "Dokuhaku," which served as the theme song for the first part of the Fate/Grand Order film Divine Realm of the Round Table: Camelot. The singles were stylized as "Dokuhaku ⇔ Yakudō" and "Yakudō ⇔ Dokuhaku", with the "⇔" officially represented as a double-headed arrow, symbolizing the complementary relationship between the two tracks. The single was released on December 9, 2020, in three formats: the FGO edition (limited and standard) featuring artwork illustrated by Takashi Takeuchi, and the Maaya edition featuring Sakamoto on the cover. The FGO edition includes an acoustic arrangement of the song "Gyakkō" as the b-side, while the Maaya edition includes the song "Itsuka Tabi ni Deru Hi", which was written and composed by Sakamoto. Additionally, the FGO limited edition includes a Blu-ray featuring the complete recording of the streaming live event Maaya Sakamoto × Fate/Grand Order 5th Anniversary Special Live, held in August 2020. The live performance included "Yakudō" alongside other tracks such as "Shikisai," "Gyakkō," and "Dokuhaku."

The collaboration with Yourness, a young Fukuoka-based rock band, was initiated through a director's recommendation to Sakamoto, who was seeking a fresh sound for FGO. Impressed by their storytelling approach, which included spoken elements, animated visuals, and a literary yet powerful rock style, Sakamoto felt a strong connection to their intellectual and multifaceted worldview. Despite no prior contact, Yourness enthusiastically accepted the opportunity to work on the project. This marked their first time composing for another artist. Yourness provided several demos, and Sakamoto selected the track that best matched FGO's worldview. She encouraged Yourness to enjoy the process and avoid overthinking, given their initial nervousness. She also requested a song with brightness and an open feel, rather than aggressive or overly serious intensity. The result was a track with an unconventional structure, featuring a new melody in the second verse and a conversational, almost spoken melody that Sakamoto found enjoyable to sing. The recording process was marked by the band's enthusiasm, with Koga's animated retries during guitar solos noted as endearing by Sakamoto, contrasting her usual sessions with seasoned studio musicians.

== Composition and themes ==
"Yakudō" is a pop rock song with an unconventional structure, featuring irregular time signatures and a conversational melody. Sakamoto described the song's structure as a "gradual climb" to a "breathtaking view," with irregular melodies that evoke a sense of dynamism and youthful vigor. Sakamoto crafted lyrics to suit both her voice and the potential for Yourness's vocalist, Yuji Kurokawa, to perform it, inspired by his unique and captivating vocal style. Drawing from Yourness's often feminine lyrical perspective, she wrote gender-neutral lyrics to ensure versatility, expressing a desire for Yourness to eventually create a self-cover version. The title "Yakudō," continues the tradition of two-kanji titles for Sakamoto's songs associated with the Fate/Grand Order games (following "Shikisai," "Gyakkō," and "Kūhaku"), and according to Sakamoto, with it she wanted to evoke a sense of vibration and life, contrasting the more static or phenomenal imagery of prior titles. As for the lyrics, Sakamoto was briefed on future plot developments with the game's creator, Kinoko Nasu, including the conclusion of the game's second part. This allowed her to craft lyrics that align closely with the story's themes.

== Track listing ==
All lyrics are written by Maaya Sakamoto.

Yakudō - digital single
No.	Title	Music	Arrangement	Length
1.	"Yakudō" (躍動, lit. 'Vitality')	Shohei Koga (Yourness)	Yourness	4:09
Total length:				4:09

Yakudō/Dokuhaku - CD single (Maaya edition)
No.	Title	Music	Arrangement	Length
1.	"Yakudō" (躍動)	Shohei Koga (Yourness)	Yourness	4:09
2.	"Dokuhaku" (独白, lit. 'Monologue')	Takahito Uchisawa (Androp)	Uchisawa	4:43
3.	"Itsuka Tabi ni Deru Hi" (いつか旅に出る日, lit. 'The Day I Set Out on a Journey')	Maaya Sakamoto	Shin Kono	5:04
4.	"Yakudō" (Instrumental)			4:09
5.	"Dokuhaku" (Instrumental)			4:40
Total length:				22:45

== Personnel ==
Credits adapted from the liner notes of the "Yakudō/Dokuhaku" CD single.

- Maaya Sakamoto – songwriting, vocals, production
- Shohei Koga – songwriting, guitar, programming
- Shin Kono – strings arrangements
- Yudai Tanaka – bass
- Takahiro Ono – drums
- Mio Strings – strings
- Hiromitsu Takasu – recording & mixing
- Hiroshi Kawasaki – mastering
- Masao Fukuda – A&R direction
- Shirō Sasaki – executive production

== Charts ==
=== Weekly charts ===
Weekly chart performance for "Yakudō"
Chart (2022)	Peak position
Japan (Oricon) (Note: As the double A-side single "Dokuhaku/Yakudō.")	6
Japan Anime Singles (Oricon)	2
Japan Hot 100 (Billboard Japan)	17

=== Monthly charts ===
Monthly chart performance for "Yakudō"
Chart (2022)	Position
Japan Singles (Oricon)	20
Japan Anime Singles (Oricon)	5

== Certifications ==
Certifications for "Yakudō"
Region	Certification	Certified units/sales
Japan (RIAJ) Digital	Gold	100,000^{*}
^{*} Sales figures based on certification alone.
