= The Fire Hunter =

Japanese novel series

- First novel volume cover

火狩りの王 (Hikari no Ō)
- Genre: Fantasy
- Novel series
- Written by: Rieko Hinata
- Illustrated by: Akihiro Yamada
- Published by: Holp Shuppan
- Original run: December 20, 2018 – September 3, 2020
- Volumes: 4
- Anime television series
- Directed by: Junji Nishimura
- Written by: Mamoru Oshii
- Music by: Kenji Kawai
- Studio: Signal.MD
- Licensed by: Crunchyroll
- Original network: Wowow
- Original run: January 14, 2023 – March 17, 2024
- Episodes: 20

The Fire Hunter (火狩りの王, Hikari no Ō; "The Firecatcher Lord") is a Japanese fantasy novel series written by Rieko Hinata and illustrated by Akihiro Yamada. Holp Shuppan have published four volumes between December 2018 and September 2020. An anime television series adaptation by Signal.MD aired from January to March 2023. A second season aired from January to March 2024.

== Plot ==
In the distant future, a calamity has changed human physiology so that humans will instantly combust when in the presence of fire. As a result, human civilization collapsed until they discover an alternative fuel source derived from the blood of demonic Fire Fiends. As a result, the elite Fire Hunters are formed, whose sole purpose is to hunt down Fire Fiends and harvest their blood, fueling a new industrial revolution.

Touko, a young girl who lives in a remote village, wanders into the forest and stumbles into a battle between a Fire Hunter and a Fire Fiend. The Fire Hunter is mortally wounded saving Touko, with his last words telling her the name of his dog, Kanata. Due to being responsible for the Fire Hunter's death, Touko is tasked by her village to take Kanata and the slain Fire Hunter's belongings to the Capital and return them to his family. Feeling responsible as well, Touko embarks on the long and dangerous journey to the Capital to fulfill her duty.

== Characters ==
Touko (灯子)
Voiced by: Misaki Kuno
Koushi (煌四)
Voiced by: Shōya Ishige
Akira (明楽)
Voiced by: Maaya Sakamoto
Kira (綺羅)
Voiced by: Saori Hayami
Roroku (炉六)
Voiced by: Yoshimasa Hosoya
Hinako (緋名子)
Voiced by: Megumi Yamaguchi
Kun (クン)
Voiced by: Sachi Kokuryu
Shōzō (照三)
Voiced by: Chiaki Kobayashi
Kaho (火穂)
Voiced by: Makoto Koichi
Yuoshichi (油百七)
Voiced by: Kenta Miyake
Hibana (火華)
Voiced by: Kaori Nazuka
Takimi (焚三)
Voiced by: Mamoru Miyano
Haijū (灰十)
Voiced by: Shin-ichiro Miki
Benio (紅緒)
Voiced by: Yuko Hara
Hotaru (ほたる)
Voiced by: Yume Miyamoto
Sakuroku (炸六)
Voiced by: Shun'ichi Maki
Enzen (炎千)
Voiced by: Yōji Ueda
Hitō (火十)
Voiced by: Ryūnosuke Watanuki
Hibari (ひばり)
Voiced by: Akira Ishida
Yanagi (ヤナギ)
Voiced by: Sayaka Ohara
Kiri (キリ)
Voiced by: Yū Shimamura
Narrator (ナレーション, Narēshon)
Voiced by: Yoshiko Sakakibara
Yururuho (揺るる火) / Sennen Suisei (千年彗星)
Voiced by: Manaka Iwami
Ruri Matsuri (瑠璃茉莉, Matsuri Ruri)
Voiced by: M.A.O

== Media ==
=== Novel ===
No.	Release date	ISBN
1	December 20, 2018	978-4-59-310022-4
2	May 20, 2019	978-4-59-310073-6
3	November 12, 2019	978-4-59-310074-3
4	September 3, 2020	978-4-59-310206-8

=== Anime ===
An anime television series adaptation produced by Signal.MD was announced on November 5, 2020. The anime is directed by Junji Nishimura, with Mamoru Oshii supervising and writing the scripts, Takuya Saito designing the characters, and Kenji Kawai composing the music. It aired from January 14 to March 18, 2023, on WOWOW. The opening theme song is "Usotsuki" (嘘つき, "Liar"), performed by Leo Ieiri, and the ending theme song is "Mada Tōku ni Iru" (まだ遠くにいる, "Still Far Away"), performed by Maaya Sakamoto. Crunchyroll streamed the series.

After the tenth and final episode of the first season, a second season was announced, which aired from January 14 to March 17, 2024. The opening theme song is "Hikarakka" (飛花落花(ひからっか); "Scattered Flowers, Falling Flowers"), performed by Cocco, and the ending theme song is "Dakishimete" (抱きしめて; "Embrace"), again performed by Maaya Sakamoto.

==== Episodes ====
===== Season 1 (2023) =====
No. overall	No. in season	Title (Note: All English titles are taken from Crunchyroll.)	Directed by (Note: Information is taken from the ending credits of each episode.)	Written by	Storyboarded by	Original release date
1	1	"Departure"; Transliteration: "Tabidachi" (Japanese: 旅立ち)	Unknown	Unknown	TBA	January 14, 2023
In the future, an unspecified calamity has changed human physiology so that humans instantly combust when in the presence of natural fire. This has forced humanity to adapt by harvesting the blood of Fire Fiends to use as an alternate fuel source called bottled lightning. Collecting this blood is the responsibility of the elite Fire Hunters. One day, a young girl named Touko wanders into the forest and is attacked by a Fire Fiend. A Fire Hunter named Haijuu intervenes and is mortally wounded saving her. The Fire Hunter entrusts his dog, Kanata, to Touko before dying. Touko's guardians then instruct her that it is her responsibility to return Kanata and the Fire Hunter's belongings to his family, meaning she has to travel to the capital. Touko hitches a ride with a traveling collection truck and begins her journey to the Capital. Meanwhile, at the Capital, a young man named Koushi mourns the death of his mother when he receives a mysterious letter from the wealthy Okibi family.
2	2	"The Three Brides"; Transliteration: "San-nin no Hanayome" (Japanese: 三人の花嫁)	Unknown	Unknown	TBA	January 21, 2023
While riding the collection truck, Touko meets three other passengers: Hotaru, Benio, and Kaho who are traveling to other villages to be brides. They explain that they have effectively been banished from their respective villages in an attempt to get rid of perceived curses. Touko also learns that there is another Fire Hunter in the second collection truck. Meanwhile, in the Capital, Koushi travels to the Okibi estate and meets Youschichi Okibi, a wealthy factory owner and an old friend of Koushi's father Haijuu. With Koushi's mother dead and Haijuu having left the Capital on Fire Hunter business, Yuoshichi offers to house Koushi and his ill sister at his estate. In return, Koushi needs to research a way to enhance bottled lightning to harness the power of the extremely volatile skyfire, since Yuoshichi foresees the collapse of the current government and a powerful energy source will be needed to survive the resulting chaos. At the collection truck, the caravan makes a brief stop to refuel and allow the Fire Hunter to hunt. Kaho attempts to escape the truck and Touko tries to stop her, only for Kaho to be captured by a Fire Fiend. The Fire Hunter and Kanata intervene, killing the Fire Fiend and saving both girls. However, the chief of the truck warns Touko that she violated rules by exiting the truck without permission, so she will be forced off at the next village.
3	3	"Fractions of the World"; Transliteration: "Sekai no Kakera" (Japanese: 世界のかけら)	Unknown	Unknown	TBA	January 28, 2023
While settling into the Okibi household, Koushi meets Youschichi's daughter Kira and wife Hibana. Meawnhile, Kouchi's sister Hinako is put under the care of the family doctor, Takimi. Youschichi then shows Koushi his secret workshop, and explains that he believes the nation will collapse since a rebel group called the Spiders plan attack the Capital. He also expresses his mistrust of the Divine Clans that rule them, as he suspects they were responsible for a deadly fire in the Capital in order to cull the population. Meanwhile, on the collection truck, Benio is able to convince one of the crew, Shouzou, to talk the captain into letting Touko stay on the truck. Hotaru is let off the truck at the next village the caravan continues on its way. The caravan then makes another stop for fuel, but is then attacked by a massive dragon-like creature.
4	4	"Flickering Flame"; Transliteration: "Yururu Hi" (Japanese: 揺るる火)	Unknown	Unknown	TBA	February 4, 2023
The dragon attacks the train, forcing Touko, Kanata, Kaho, and Shouzou to flee into the forest while Benio and the rest of the caravan are killed in the attack. They manage to find refuge with the Tree People, who explain the dragon is actually the guardian deity of Kaho's Crystal Village, which has been driven mad due to interference from the Spiders. The Tree People promise to escort the group to the nearest village. In the Capital, Koushi continues his skyfire experiments and heads to the Central Archive to learn more. He learns of the history of the Fire Hunters, and how only their sickles are able slay fire fiends and fallbeasts. He also learns that humanity once launched a satellite into space called the "Flickering Flame", and it is prophesized that the person who can recover the Flickering Flame will be declared the Lord of Fire Hunters. Unable to learn anything more, Koushi decides to attend the Boat Festival with Kira and Hinako.
5	5	"The Spider Child"; Transliteration: "Kumo no Ko" (Japanese: 蜘蛛の子)	Unknown	Unknown	TBA	February 11, 2023
Touko's group manages to reach the next village but they are ambushed by Spiders. The Spiders are chased off thanks to the intervention of a Fire Hunter named Akira and her hound Temari. Akira agrees to escort the trio to a Fire Hunter camp at the coast, where they can take a boat to the Capital. On the way there, they find a Spider child named Kun wandering the forest and capture him. At the Capital, Koushi has a nightmare of witnessing Hinako being killed by the volatile skyfire. He attends a dinner party hosted by the Okibis, where he meets a Fire Hunter named Roroku and his hound Mizore who specialize in hunting fallbeasts. Koushi tells Roroku that he wants to learn more about fallbeasts and skyfire, and Roroku offers to bring Koushi along on one of his hunts. At the coast, Touko's group are shocked to discover all of the Fire Hunters at the camp were killed by fire. Kun reveals that the Spiders let themselves be bitten by bugs whose venom protects them from fire, allowing them to weaponize it. Fiends then attack the group and Shouzou is badly injured while Touko is forced to use Haijuu's sickle to protect Kaho from a Fiend. The group manages to sail to sea, and Kun admits that he was abandoned by the Spiders since the bug venom didn't work on him. As the group sails for the Capital, they are followed by a massive whale.
6	6	"The Capital"; Transliteration: "Shuto" (Japanese: 首都)	Unknown	Unknown	TBA	February 18, 2023
Touko and her companions see the whale, which Akira explains is the tombwhale, a god of the sea that collects the memories of the dead. Touko pleads with the tombwhale not to take Shouzou, and it apparently listens to her and swims away. At the Capital, Koushi meets Roroku in the forest to accompany him on his hunt. Roroku warns Koushi that the Okibis are not to be trusted, and Koushi finds out that Roroku is able to use skyfire to blind fiends. During the hunt, the come across another group of Fire Hunters who are interrogating a captured Spider. The Spider manages to break free of his bonds and attacks Roroku, forcing him to kill the Spider right in front of a shocked Koushi. Meanwhile, Touko and her group finally reach the capital, where they stay with Shouzou's family as he recovers. The next day, Touko heads out with Kanata to pick up medicine. On the way back, Kanata instead heads for Haijuu's old home, which is now abandoned. When a policeman confronts Touko, she and Kanata flee and end up encountering Kira.
7	7	"Chance Encounter"; Transliteration: "Kaikō" (Japanese: 邂逅)	Unknown	Unknown	TBA	February 25, 2023
Kira helps Touko calm down and Kanata guides her back home. Kira then tells Koushi about Touko and Kanata, which piques his curiosity. Koushi then makes a deal with Youschichi to allow him and Roroku to plant bottled lightning around the Capital in preparation for the Spider invasion. Meanwhile, Akira goes out hunting to buy more medicine for Shouzou, while Kaho decides to marry Shouzou so she can take care of them. Touko decides to try and return Kanata to his home again, while Kun sets an insect familiar and goes into a trance. Touko and Kanata return to Haijuu's home, where they encounter Koushi who helps them evade a spy familiar sent by the Divine Clans. Touko tells Koushi about how Haijuu died saving her and returns his belongings, which gives Koushi much needed closure about his father's fate. Touko then sees a Tree Person pass by and she remembers that Tree People live in the Forbidden District, and decides to get medicine from them for Shouzou. Koushi offers to be her guide in return for her telling him how the Spiders can use fire. However, they are secretly followed by the spy familiar.
8	8	"Garden of the Gods"; Transliteration: "Kami no Niwa" (Japanese: 神々の庭)	Unknown	Unknown	TBA	March 4, 2023
Touko and Koushi head to the Forbidden District, where one of the Tree People leads them to their secret home underneath the Capital. While the Tree People that live in the Capital do not have medicine, they do reveal that the Tree People were artificially created by the Divine Clans to assist the villages out in the wilds. They also reveal to Koushi that fire fiends were also a creation of the Divine Clans, and that humanity's aversion of fire was caused by biological weapons developed by ancient humans. As Touko and Koushi leave, they are attacked by familiars. Akira arrives to protect them, and the familiars are eventually called off by a member of the Divine Clans. Touko formally returns Kanata to Koushi, but he allows her to keep Haijuu's sickle. Touko and Koushi return home where Shouzou finally regains consciousness. Meanwhile, the Tree People muse how the Divine Clans fear the return of the Flickering Flame and the appearance of the Lord of the Fire Hunters, and welcome the Flickering Flame in the hopes that it will destroy both humanity and the Divine Clans.
9	9	"The Lightning Cannon"; Transliteration: "Raigekihō" (Japanese: 雷撃砲)	Unknown	Unknown	TBA	March 11, 2023
Koushi attends a meeting between Youschichi, Akira, and Roroku, where Akira warns them that the Spiders are attacking collection trucks and have found a way to safely wield fire. Youschichi agrees to send out more collection trucks to help the villages, since the Divine Clans appear to be doing nothing about it. Koushi returns to his room and is confronted by the Divine Clan member in charge of the spies, Hibari of the Wind Clan. Hibari confirms that the Spiders will arrive at the Capital in nine days, and mentions that he has taken an interest in Koushi and Touko before leaving. The next day, Koushi and Youschichi then test Koushi's newest invention, the Lightning Cannon, which can fire devastating Skyfire shells at long distances, which Youschichi plans to use against both the Divine Clans and Spiders to get rid of them at the same time. Koushi later meets Akira and Roroku again and learns that they are close friends. He then realizes that it was Akira's brother who brought the book containing many of the world's secrets to the Central Archive. That night, Akira tells Touko that she knows the Divine Clans killed her brother because he knew about the Flickering Flame. Despite that, she intends to make an appeal to the Divine Clans to take action. Touko insists on coming with Akira, and suggests that she become the Lord of Fire Hunters.
10	10	"Malformed Children"; Transliteration: "Igyō no Kora" (Japanese: 異形の子ら)	Unknown	Unknown	TBA	March 18, 2023
Hinako is suddenly struck down by a fever, but Kanata suddenly acts aggressive towards the doctor, forcing Koushi to move Hinako to a separate room for treatment. However, Kira realizes the doctor, her family, and the house staff are keeping details of Hinako's condition secret and confronts. Hibana drugs Kira, but is suddenly attacked by Hinako, who has gained inhuman speed and strength. Hinako nearly strangles Hibana to death before fleeing the mansion, with Kanata giving chase. Meanwhile, Touko and Akira make their way to the Divine Palace when they are intercepted by Hibari. He shows them a meeting between the Divine Clans, revealing that the Lady Goddess, Lady Tayurahime, is growing weaker trying to maintain the protective wards around the Capital and the villages, and they intend to replace her with the Flickering Flame, which is why they want to prevent the rise of the Lord of Fire Hunters. Akira and Touko both insist on finding the Flickering Flame themselves, causing Hibana to attack them. Kun intervenes with his insect familiars. Enraged at their defiance, Hibana blows everybody into the river. Touko and Temari are saved by Hinako, who thanks them for taking care of Kanata before leaving to rescue Akira and Kun. Koushi is warned by Roroku that Fiends have suddenly begun appearing in the Capital itself. One of the Fiends attacks Touko, which seems to awaken hidden combat instincts within her and she kills the Fiend with Haijuu's scythe.

===== Season 2 (2024) =====
No. overall	No. in season	Title	Directed by	Written by	Storyboarded by	Original release date
11	1	"Lunar Sickles"; Transliteration: "Tsuki no Kama" (Japanese: 月の鎌)	Unknown	Unknown	TBA	January 14, 2024
Akira arrives with Kun and finds Touko with the slain Fire Fiend. At that moment, an alert goes out that an army of fiends have penetrated the Capital's defensive wards, and the Fire Hunters mobilize en masse to repel them. Touko kills many of the fiends but falls unconscious from exhaustion. Akira retreats with Touko and Kun and meets up with Koushi. Meanwhile, Touko makes contact with a woman in her dreams who she believes is the Flickering Flame. Seeing Hinako's superhuman abilities, Koushi concludes that her body was secretly modified by the gods. Akira arranges for Touko to be evacuated back to the Capital while she makes her way to the divine palace to become the Lord of Fire Hunters. Koushi heads over to take command of the second lightning cannon, leaving Kanata to protect Kun. Upon arrive at the second lightning cannon, Koushi encounters Hibari, who reveals that the Spiders have already infiltrated to the Capital thanks to a series of secret tunnels built by humans specifically to aid their invasion.
12	2	"Roaring Thunder"; Transliteration: "Kaminari Todoroki" (Japanese: 雷轟)	Unknown	Unknown	TBA	January 21, 2024
Hibari takes his leave, warning Koushi not to attempt to take the Flickering Flame. With the crew having fled, Koushi enlists Kun's aid to fire the lightning cannon. The two lightning cannons rain shells down on the Spiders, inflicting heavy losses on them. A Spider then tries to attack Koushi and Kun, but is mortally wounded by Roroku. Kun recognizes the Spider as On, one of his tribe members. On reveals that the Spiders were once part of the Fire Clan and had mastery of fire before being cast out of the Divine Clans. As revenge, the Spiders are attacking the Capital to return fire to humanity. Meanwhile, Touko encounters some of Okibi's servants who take her back to Okibi's estate. On the way, Touko learns how much of the Capital's population actually supports the Spiders due to the poor working conditions in the factories they are forced to endure. Upon seeing Touko, Kira decides to go find Koushi. However, she is instead captured by the Divine Clans, who intend to use her as a temporary vessel for the Flickering Flame.
13	3	"The Great Tree"; Transliteration: "Kyoboku" (Japanese: 巨木)	Unknown	Unknown	TBA	January 28, 2024
Kanata leaves to go protect Touko, and Koushi and Kun attempt to follow him. Meanwhile, the Flickering Flame instructs Hibari to keep watch over Touko. Touko returns to the factory district under guidance from the Flickering Flame and is reunited with Kanata, but discovers that the crew of the first lightning cannon has been slain by fiends. The treefolk then emerge from underground, revealing that the forbidden quarter has been collapsed by the Divine Clans in an effort to fight the Spiders' fires. Ruri-Matsuri of the Wood Clan then arrives to fight fires set by the Spiders' human collaborators under the belief the Spiders will grant them bodies immune to fire after death. She also complains about how Hibari is doing nothing to fight the Spiders and didn't warn the Divine Clans about the invasion. Koushi and Kun move through the underground tunnels to find Touko, but are blocked by one of Okibi's maids who warns them not to proceed any farther or they will burn. She also reveals that she is no longer human, which shocks Koushi.
14	4	"Banked Fire"; Transliteration: "Uma Hi" (Japanese: 埋火)	Unknown	Unknown	TBA	February 4, 2024
Koushi suddenly finds himself in a meeting between the Flickering Flame, Hibari, and Takimi. Takimi admits that he and the Water Clan have secretly been experimenting on humans and evolve them to the point where they no longer need fire to survive, with Hinako being their most successful test subject. Hibari warns Koushi about the Earth Clan intending to use Kira as a vessel for the Flickering Flame. Koushi then regains consciousness and comes across of the corpses of the Spiders killed by the lightning cannons. He and Kun are reunited with Touko and Kanata and they come across Okibi, who is using a new weapon to hunt down and kill gods in revenge for the Great Fire. He instructs the group to use a nearby escape tunnel, where they find Temari but Akira is missing. They continue heading through the tunnels until Touko is contacted by the Flickering Flame, who explains that she was originally an observation satellite that was supposed to coordinate search and rescue operations, but the only means for her to contact the ground were lost over time. Forced to constantly watch humans suffering, the Flickering Flame attempted to leave Earth, but was forced to return because she couldn't overwrite her own directives. The group is suddenly attacked by aquatic monsters, but are saved by Hibari, who directs them to the palace and advises them to help the Flickering Flame come to a final decision.
15	5	"Sea of Trees"; Transliteration: "Jukai" (Japanese: 樹海)	Unknown	Unknown	TBA	February 11, 2024
The group continues moving through the tunnels until they are reunited with Akira and Roroku, who explain they have only made it as far as the palace gates. The group then finds themselves lost in a forest due to interference from the gods. After sleeping in for the night, the group decides to split up. Akira, Touko, and Kun head deeper into the forest to find the bugs that can grant immunity to fire, in hopes of being able to spread the discover to other humans. Koushi and Roroku each take a copy of Akira's letter to the Flickering Flame and head back to the Capital. Roroku instructs Koushi to find Hinako while he goes to the palace to rescue Kira. While searching for Hinako, Koushi comes across his teacher Mr. Hitoo. Feeling guilty over his role in killing so many Spiders, Koushi tells Hitoo everything about the lightning cannon. Hitoo reassures Koushi that he is still a good person despite what he has done. They then notice that the first lightning cannon has dead horses strung all over it, so that their blood can repel the gods.
16	6	"The Divine Palace"; Transliteration: "Jingū" (Japanese: 神宮)	Unknown	Unknown	TBA	February 18, 2024
Koushi reunites with Hinako and finds a dying Kiri, and decides to help her reunite with Kunugi, the last remaining Tree Person. Meanwhile, Touko, Akira, and Kun make their way back to the palace, though they have to neutralize a Spider sympathizer who tries to kill them with a suicide bomb. Upon returning to the factory district, they are attacked by Mrs. Okibi, who has also turned inhuman due to Takimi's experiments. She attacks Akira, forcing Kun to have his venomous bugs bite her and forcing her to retreat. They then encounter Kaho, who warns them that support for the Spiders is growing among the populace now that they have lost their faith in the Divine Clans. She pleads for Akira to become the Lord of the Fire Hunters to give humans hope again. Koushi's group catches up to Kunugi at the gates to the palace, where they meet Ruri-Matsuri, who reveals the Wood Clan plans to bury the Flickering Flame to end its potential threat once and for all. Hinako's body then begins breaking down when Takimi's drugs wear off. Angered at the death of the rest of the Tree People, Kunugi uses his own body to create a bridge to the palace, allowing Koushi and Hinako to cross. However, they are met by Takimi, who asks Koushi to let him take Hinako so he can complete his experiments.
17	7	"The Empty Girl"; Transliteration: "Kokū no Musume" (Japanese: 虚空の娘)	Unknown	Unknown	TBA	February 25, 2024
Takimi attempts to forcibly inject both Koushi and Hinako with his experimental drug, but they are saved by Mizore's intervention. Hibari and Kira, having been turned into a vessel for the Flickereing Flame, then arrive. Meanwhile, Touko, Akira, and Kun come across Kunugi's body and begin scaling it to reach the palace. At the palace, The Flickering Flame tells Hibari that she does not wish to become a puppet for the Divine Clans, and asks that Hibari ensure Koushi and Hinako can escape back to the city. Hinako then goes berserk and attacks Hibari, badly wounding him while Roroku arrives and kills Takimi. With Akira nowhere in sight, Roroku prepares to present his petition to Tayurahime, but he is stopped by a member of the Earth Clan. Okibi then emerges from the palace, having captured Tayurahime, and murders her while his servant sacrifices himself to kill the Earth Clan member. Obsessed with making sure the Divine Clans will never be able to rule again, Okibi approaches the Flickering Flame with the intent to kill her.
18	8	"Heavenly Beast"; Transliteration: "Ten no Kemono" (Japanese: 天の獣)	Unknown	Unknown	TBA	March 3, 2024
Okibi prepares to kill Kira to destroy the Flickering Flame, but is suddenly attacked by Hibana, causing the both of them to fall to their deaths. Koushi then goes to help Roroku, but he has been mortally wounded and dies. Meanwhile, Touko, Akira, and Kun continue to scale Kunugi's body and they come across Kun's father, who tells him to stay with the humans and pleads with Akira to reclaim fire for humanity before succumbing to his wounds. Touko is then contacted by the Flickering Flame again, who tells her that her control of Kira's body is not perfect and Kira's will still exists inside her. As Touko regains consciousness, everybody can see the Millenial Comet getting larger in the sky, meaning that it is falling towards Earth. A fallbeast then attacks the palace, and Touko and Kanata prepare to fight it.
19	9	"Lady Goddess"; Transliteration: "Hime-kami" (Japanese: 姫神)	Unknown	Unknown	TBA	March 10, 2024
Temari and Mizore join Touko and Kanata, and together manage to defeat the fallbeast, though at the cost of Mizore's life. Hibari then tells them that Tayurahime has invited them to meet her, with the one Okibi killed being a body double. The ground then collapses, and Touko is approached by Hibari, who reveals that Tayurahime has chosen Touko and wants to meet her personally. Touko then wakes up with the rest of the group in an abandoned laboratory, having been rescued by Ruri-Matsuri. Upon exploring the lab, the group discovers that the Divine Clans genetically engineered the fiends, and reproduce by genetically engineering human infants. Akira then heads off to confront Tayurahime with Touko, Koushi, and Kanata going after her while Kiri stays behind with Kun and Hinako. As they approach the real palace, Koushi comes to the realization that Ruri-Matsuri showed the lab as a test to see what they would do with the information they learned. In addition, he deduces that the true purpose of fire hunting and the factories the Divine Clans built in the capital are to produce purified Fiendfire, which is used to extend Tayurahime's lifespan. Meanwhile, Akira reaches Tayurahime's shrine first and confronts Hibari.
20	10	"Lamplight"; Transliteration: "Tomoshibi" (Japanese: 灯し火)	Unknown	Unknown	TBA	March 17, 2024
Touko, Koushi, and Kanata catch up with Akira and confront Hibari, who stands down with both Tayurahime and the Flickering Flame who themselves. The Flickering Flame leaves Kira's body and reveals that both she and Tayurahime no longer wish to rule over humanity or serve the Divine Clans' bidding. Seeing that Touko resembles all of the people that she wanted to save, the Flickering Flame honors Akira's petition and allows herself to be hunted by Touko. Touko reluctantly kills the Flickering Flame while Tayurahime perishes at the same time, becoming the Lord of the Fire Hunters and the new leader of the Divine Clans and humanity. Afterwards, Touko sets up new reforms, which includes sending Fire Hunters to all of the outlying villages to train new Fire Hunters who will be permanently stationed in each village. Meanwhile, scientific research will be carried out on the Spiders' bugs in an effort to cure humanity of their aversion to fire. Touko then decides to return to her home village while Akira rules in her stead at the Capital. Koushi, Kira, and Hinako stay behind at the capital to wait for Touko's return. Touko returns to her village and is welcomed by her family and friends.
