= Chilldspot =

Japanese band

- Origin: Tokyo, Japan
- Genres: J-pop; Pop rock
- Years active: 2019–present
- Labels: Rainbow Entertainment; Pony Canyon
- Members: Hiyune; Ryozan; Kozaki
- Past members: Justin
- Website: fan.pia.jp/chilldspot/

Chilldspot (Japanese: チルズポット, Hepburn: Chiruzupotto; stylized in lower case) is a Japanese band formed in December 2019 in Tokyo. Their music is characterized by its refusal to be confined to a single genre, drawing from the members' diverse musical influences, which range from vocaloid, Western music, classical music, to Japanese rock, hip-hop, jazz, and funk.

== Biography ==
Chilldspot was formed in late 2019 around vocalist Hiyune, who initially aspired to pursue a solo career with a backing band. However, feeling limited by her own songwriting and lack of technical skills in guitar and music production, she decided to form a band with friends from her high school music club. Kozaki, Hiyune's childhood friend, joined after years of playing cover songs in their high school music club and wanting to explore original compositions. Justin, a fellow member of the same high school music club, was invited to join during his second year of high school. Initially hesitant due to commitments to another band, he later accepted Hiyune's persistent invitation. Ryōzan, from a different high school, met the group through a joint live event organized by multiple school music clubs, where he and Justin had previously performed together as club leaders. Hiyune, impressed by Ryōzan's guitar skills, invited him to join after consulting Justin, completing the lineup. Their name derives from a combination of the English words "chill", "child", "spot", and "pot", reflecting their ethos of creating adaptable, youthful music that connects with diverse audiences. The band's early days were marked by a close, friend-like dynamic, with Hiyune noting that the fun of making music with friends surpassed her initial solo ambitions.

In November 2020, while still in high school, Chilldspot released their debut extended play entitled The Youth Night. Tracks like "Yoru no Tanken" and "Neon o Keshite" gained traction on music streaming charts, which eventually led to the band being featured on Spotify's "Radar: Early Noise 2021" and YouTube Music's "Foundry" programs in 2021, spotlighting them as rising artists. On September 15, 2021, Chilldspot released their debut full-length album, Ingredients, which reflected their genre-diverse sound, blending Japanese rock, hip-hop, jazz, funk, and more, with songs exploring their teenage experiences.

In 2022, the band released two additional extended plays, Around Dusk and Titles, and from September to October, they embarked on their first nationwide tour, Childspot One Man Tour "Road Movie,", performing across six cities and culminating in a sold-out show at Zepp DiverCity in Tokyo. On December 16, 2022, they released the digital single "Get High," written as the theme song for the Japanese film Koi no Ibara directed by Hideo Jojo. This became the first time the band was commissioned to write a perform a theme song for a feature film.

In 2023, they released their second studio album, entitled Portrait, which showcased a broader sound with influences like grunge and guitar rock.

In November 2024, the band signed with Chinese label Modern Sky, expanding their activities in Asia, particularly in China, Taiwan, and South Korea. This international focus, initially unplanned, grew through frequent live performances abroad.

In July 2025, drummer Justin left the band, leaving Hiyune, Ryozan, and Kozaki to continue as a three-piece. On September 24, 2025, the band released their third album, entitled Handmade, which featured all members contributing to songwriting, composition, and arrangement, reflecting their evolving creative process, and has distinctive indie pop and alternative elements, moving away from the R&B-heavy sound of their early work.

== Band members ==
- Hiyune (比喩根; born 2002) – vocals, guitar
  Hiyune is the primary songwriter, crafting both melodies and lyrics, which the band then arranges collaboratively. Her influences include idol acts like AKB48, vocaloid, and Western black music.
- Ryozan (玲山, Ryōzan; born 2002) – guitar
  Rooted in Japanese rock bands like Bump of Chicken and Radwimps, his influences also include jazz.
- Kozaki (小﨑; born 2002) – bass
  Hiyune's childhood friend, whose calm and optimistic personality balances the band's dynamic. His influences include Japanese rock, vocaloid, EDM, and funk.

Former members

- Justin (ジャスティン; born 2002) – drums
  His influences included hip-hop and R&B. Left the band in July 2025.

== Discography ==
=== Studio albums ===
Title	Details
Ingredients	Released: September 15, 2021; Label: Rainbow Entertainment; Formats: CD, digital download
Portrait	Released: May 3, 2023; Label: Pony Canyon; Formats: CD, CD+Blu-ray, digital download
Handmade	Released: September 24, 2025; Label: Pony Canyon; Formats: CD+Blu-ray, digital download
