= Senri Oe =

Japanese musician

- 大江千里
- Born: 6 September 1960 (age 65); Fujiidera, Osaka, Japan
- Education: Kwansei Gakuin University The New School of Jazz
- Occupations: Jazz pianist, singer-songwriter, composer, lyricist (Japanese), writer (Japanese)
- Years active: 1983–present
- Musical career
- Genres: Jazz; City pop; rock; world music
- Instruments: Piano, keyboard
- Labels: Sony Masterworks; Sony music direct; PND Records
- Website: www.peaceneverdie.com

Senri Oe (大江 千里, Ōe Senri; born 6 September 1960) is a Japanese jazz pianist, composer, producer, actor, singer, and songwriter. He is best known for his pop-music career in 1980s and '90's-era Japanese city pop music'. Among his releases (totaling 45 singles and 18 original albums), from the 1980s to the 1990s, are eight albums which received Japan's Gold Disc Award (Japan's equivalent to a Grammy for Best Album). He was also awarded the Gold Disc Award for Best Male Pop Artist in 1989.

Senri Oe's pop music garnered mass popularity in Japan following his first single "Wallabee Shoes" in 1983. He has held concerts in Japan's largest stadiums, including Nippon Budokan, Yokohama Arena, Yokohama Stadium, Chiba Marine Stadium, Seibu Dome, NHK Hall, and Osaka Castle Hall.

He has also written and produced music for many artists, including Seiko Matsuda, Misato Watanabe, Hiromi Go, Hikaru Genji and Sayuri Ishikawa also composing music for the soundtrack of the film Doraemon: Nobita's Great Adventure in the South Seas, as well as "Believe" which was featured in Sanrio Puroland.

== Early life ==
Senri Oe was born on September 6, 1960, in Fujiidera city Osaka, Japan. Oe began playing piano at the age of three, and was trained by his junior high school teacher Yumi Nara, who would go on to become an acclaimed opera singer. After each of the lessons, Nara would encourage Oe to improvise, and eventually Oe began to compose.

Upon being introduced to music by The Carpenters, Captain & Tenille and Gilbert O'Sullivan, Oe decided to become a singer-songwriter. Soon after, Oe's music repertoire expanded to include jazz musicians such as Chris Conor, Bill Evans, Thelonious Monk, Antonio Carlos Jobim, Winton Kelly, Miles Davis and Charlie Parker.

In 1975, Oe participated in the final Yamaha Popular Song Contest POPCON (akin to American Idol). Later in 1980, Oe entered Kwansei Gakuin University and majored in economics while simultaneously beginning to pursue a professional music career. He formed his first band during his time at university, was scouted by Sony Music and signed to Epic Sony Japan in 1981.

== Music career ==
=== 1983–1984: Early pop career and debut album ===
On February 27, 1983, Oe performed on STV Radio's Sunday Jumbo Special in Sapporo, Hokkaido, granting him his initial exposure as a professional musician. Within this segment, Oe began a ten-minute performance in which he improvised a song on live radio.

Oe soon released his first single "Wallabee Shoes (ワラビーぬぎすてて)," followed by his debut album, WAKUWAKU. Quickly garnering popularity, "Wallabee Shoes" charted at No. 10 in Sapporo radio. Oe appeared on All Night Fuji (Akin to Saturday Night Live in Japan) on Channel 8 alongside Epic Sony label-mates Wham from Britain.

=== 1985–2007: Greater pop music career success ===
After graduating from Kwansei Gakuin University, Oe rose to fame in November 1984 with the success of his sixth single, "10 People, 10 Colors (十人十色)." His third album, Miseinen (未成年) Juvenile charted at No. 5 on Oricon (Japanese equivalent to the Billboard weekly chart).

With his now growing popularity across Japan, Oe began a tour, performing in Japan's largest venues and stadiums, including Nippon Budokan (with seating capacity of 14,471, akin to Madison Square Garden) to promote his fifth album, AVEC Tour Final, in 1987.

His seventh album 1234 was awarded Album of the Year in the third Gold Disc Awards (Japan's equivalent of the Grammy Awards) in the Pop Male Solo Artist Category.

Continuing to tour large venues throughout Japan, Oe released the greatest hits album, Sloppy Joe, on March 25, 1989, which charted at No. 2 on the Oricon (Japan's equivalent of Billboard weekly chart).

Meanwhile, Oe appeared as an actor on television for the first time, in the dramatic show entitled Kimi Ga Uso Wo Tuita. His ninth album, APOLLO, was the first of his albums to be recorded in New York City. The album was released to critical acclaim, charting at No.1 in the Oricon weekly chart on September, 21st 1990. Following APOLLO's success, Oe again toured in stadiums (Yokohama Stadium, Seibu Dome, Chiba Marine Stadium, Yokohama Arena, Osaka Castle Hall).

Oe's single "Never See You Again (格好悪いふられ方) Kakko Warui Furare Kata" was released in September 1990 and is his highest-charting single to date, charting at No.2 in the Oricon weekly chart.

While continuing to record and perform, in 2000 Oe established his own record label, Station Kids Records, as an imprint of Sony Music Entertainment Japan.

Oe also began to branch out to musical composition beyond pop music. Among these projects, he scored the soundtrack for the film Noto No Hanayome, Sanrio Puroland Park's Musical titled Believe, music for the performances of illusionist Princess Tenko Play, for Destiny. Also, notably, Oe scored music for the Japanese animated film Doraemon: Nobita's Great Adventure in the South Seas, as well as "Kono Hoshino Dokokade" by Yasuda Sisters.

=== 2008–2012: Career shift to jazz ===
On December 22, 2007, Oe announced that he would study jazz music in The New School for Jazz and moved to Manhattan on January 10, 2008, with his then puppy, a dachshund named Peace. Oe had been studying jazz music theory since the age of fifteen, at school, but due to his pop singer-songwriter career unexpectedly taking off, he had chosen to pause his jazz aspirations and to pursue them later in life.

=== 2012–present: Beginning of jazz pianist career ===
After graduating from The New School for Jazz, Oe launched his jazz record label in 2012. It was called "Peace Never Die" Records, abbreviated to PND Records. His dog, Peace, also appeared in PND's logo. Peace has received a certificate which allows her to officially qualify as an emotional support dog for Oe.

Oe's jazz debut album was Boys Mature Slow. Following conversations with former Tokyo Jazz Festival producer, Atsuko Yashima, Oe concluded that his second album's style could expand to include for a jazz 'big band' ensemble. He then composed eleven pieces for his next album, Spooky Hotel, which was released in 2013.Following Spooky Hotel, Oe's big band performed in the Tokyo Jazz Festival at Tokyo Forum A Hall. Oe's working towards composing for a drum-less trio was entitled Collective Scribble; Oe remarked that, saxophone and piano combined with upright bass, "like a drawing scribble."

At the same time, Oe was creating his fourth jazz vocal album, Answer July, with Sheila Jordan, Jon Hendricks, Theo Bleckmann and Lauren Kinhan. Answer July was a Grammy-nominated consideration album in the Best Jazz Album in 2017.

In addition, Oe challenged himself to adopt the concept of combining pop with jazz in his fifth studio jazz album Boys & Girls, released in 2018. For Boys & Girls, Oe selected some of his most popular pop songs to reinterpret into jazz compositions (which Oe calls, "Senri Jazz"). Boys & Girls charted at No. 1 in Japan Billboard's "Jazz and Classical Music Chart". Following the release, Oe toured to promote the new album in Amsterdam, Mexico City, and throughout the United States.

Recently, Oe released his sixth studio jazz album Hmmm in 2019. Both the recordings and performances have featured bandmates Ari Hoenig (drums) and Matt Clohesy (upright bass).

== Discography ==
=== Singles ===
==== Pop ====
- Wallabee Shoes ワラビーぬぎすてて (1983)
- Girl Friend (1983)
- Futatsu no Shukudai (1983)
- Boys & Girls (1984)
- Romance (1984)
- 10 People, 10 Colors 十人十色 (1984)
- Real (1985)
- Friend (1985)
- Cosmopolitan (1986)
- Kimi to Ikitai (1986)
- Bedtime Stories, Man on the Earth (1986)
- YOU (1987)
- Power (1987)
- Glory Days (1988)
- Korekara (1988)
- Onegai Tengoku (1989)
- Radio ga yonderu (1989)
- We are Traveling Band (1989)
- Tawawa no Kajitsu (1999)
- dear (1990)
- APOLLO (1990)
- Aitai (1990)
- Never See You Again 格好悪いふられかた (1991)
- HONEST (1992)
- Arigato (1992)
- Gunbai wa Docchi ni Agaru (1991)
- Yuki no Wakare (1993)
- Kimi wo motome tsuzukeru kagiri (1991)
- Natsu no kesshin (1994)
- Shiroi Yuki Maiorita (1994)
- Nando mo sakenda (1995)
- Sayonara mo iezuni (1996)
- Hyperactive Dinosaur (1997)
- Two of us (1998)
- New Public! / Akiuta (1998)
- Yakyu no Natsu (1999)
- Billboard (2000)
- Kiseki (2001)
- This Christmas (2001)
- Oyasumi (2002)
- Let it be, SWEET (2002)
- Equal (2002)
- Seijyaku no basho (2007)

=== Original albums (studio recorded) ===
==== Pop era ====
- WAKU WAKU (1983)
- Pleasure (1984)
- Miseinen (1985)
- Chibusa (1985)
- AVEC (1986)
- OLYMPIC (1987)
- 1234 (1988)
- Redmonky Yellowfish (1989)
- Apollo (1990)
- HOMME (1991)
- Rokko Oroshifuita (1992)
- Giant Steps (1994)
- SENRI HAPPY (1996)
- ROOM (1998)
- Solitude (2000)
- First Class (2001)
- Untitled Love Songs (2002)
- Ghostwriter (2005)

==== Jazz era ====
- Boys Mature Slow (2012)
- Spooky Hotel (2013)
- Collective Scribble (2015)
- Answer July (2016)
- Boys & Girls (2018)
- Hmmm (2019)
- Letter to N.Y. (2021)

=== Best albums ===
- Sloppy Joe (1989)
- Sloppy Joe II (1994)
- WINTER JOE (1998)
- 2000 JOE (1999)
- THE LEGEND (2003)
- Sloppy Joe III (2006)
- Golden Best Senri Oe (2011)
- Sloppy Joe I & II (2013)

=== Self-covered album ===
- Home at last ~ Senri Sings Senri ~

=== Live album ===
- Live "Ghost Note" at Motion Blue YOKOHAMA (2006)

=== Instrumental albums ===
- 12 kagetsu (2003)
- ghost note (2005)

=== Others ===
1. Untokodokkoisho (2007)

2. Duo (2010)

=== CD-Box ===
- Senri Premium ~MY GLORY DAYS 1983 - 1988 (2008)

=== Soundtracks ===
- Doraemon: Nobita's Great Adventure in the South Sea (1998)
- Doraemon: Nobita's Drift in the Universe (1999)
- Two Tables (2002)
- Noto no Hanayome (2008)

== Videography ==
=== Music videos ===
- CONCISE LOVE (1984)
- Naturally (1985)
- CROQUIS (1987)
- TOLEDO"Sol y Sombra" (1988)
- OLYMPIC TORCH PART TWO "SENRI" SIDE (1988)
- OLYMPIC TORCH PART TWO "EMOTIONAL" SIDE (1988)
- 1234 SPECIAL (1989)
- redmonkey yellowfish TOUR 1989~1990 (1990)
- Tawawa no Kajitsu (1990)
- Senri Moods (1991)
- More APOLLO (1991)
- HOMME Marathon (1992)
- Chic (1992)
- Chic again (1993)
- Mickey watches me (1995)
- NEW YORK HARAJYUKU LONDON (1996)
- YAPPRI NORYO The Best of NORYO SENRI HEAVEN TAMAGOTCHI SIDE 1989~1993 (1997)
- SODESHO NORYO The Best of NORYO SENRI HEAVEN KANJYUKU SIDE 1994~1996) (1997)
- FLOWER (1998)
- Double Twisted (1999)
- Single Twisted (1999)
- HAUNTED CHRISTMAS~PAGODAPIA 1999~ (2000)
- SENRI Tour 2000 "Solitude" at SHIBUKU (2000)
- PAGODAPIA 2000 OLD FASHIONED CHRISTMAS (2001)
- senri oe tour 2001 first class (2001)
- PAGODAPIA 2002 FANTASTIC CHRISTMAS ~Train a Go! Go!~ (2002)
- Thank you, The Globe Tokyo! (2002)
- SENRI CLIPS (2003)
- SENRI CLIPS II (2005)
- Marugoto Senri Night! Kubota kun to Oe kun (2005)
- Senri Oe Xmas Concert 2005 PAGODAPIA ~A MAN AND HIS MUSIC~ (2006)
- Senri Oe Concert Tour 2006 Sloppy Joe III and more...@ Zepp Tokyo (2006)
- Oe Senri NORYO Senri Heaven 2006@ Hibiyanoon (2006)
- Senri Oe Xmas Concert 2006 PAGODAPIA "Aloha! Christmas!" (2007)
- Senri VISUAL Premium My GLORY DAYS 1983~1988 (2009)
- SENRI OE on Epic-TV eZ (2010)
- SENRI OE FANTASTIC MEMORIAL on PATI PATI & BEE (2010)
- Senri VISUAL Premium My GLORY DAYS 1989~1999 (2012)
- SENRI VIDEO CLIPS (2014)
