= Revenger (TV series) =

Japanese anime television series

- Key visual of Revenger featuring the main cast
- Genre: Action, period drama
- Created by: Nitroplus; Shochiku
- Anime television series
- Directed by: Masaya Fujimori
- Written by: Gen Urobuchi; Renji Ōki
- Music by: Jun Futamata
- Studio: Ajiado
- Licensed by: Crunchyroll
- Original network: Tokyo MX, Kansai TV, BS NTV, AT-X
- Original run: January 5, 2023 – March 23, 2023
- Episodes: 12
- Manga
- Written by: Ryūsei Yamada
- Published by: Square Enix
- Imprint: G Fantasy Comics
- Magazine: Monthly GFantasy
- Original run: January 18, 2023 – April 18, 2024
- Volumes: 2
- icon

Revenger (stylized in all caps) is an original Japanese anime television series animated by Ajiado and produced by Nitroplus and Shochiku. Set in Japan, the series follows a samurai named Raizo Kurima who crosses paths with hitmen known as Revengers after being betrayed by his superiors. It aired from January to March 2023.

== Premise ==
Raizo Kurima is a hitman working for the organization Revengers, which takes revenge on behalf of those who have no power. The group works at the "Ribenjiya" store that acts as a general store on the outside, while hiding the Revengers organization beneath the surface. Kurima's coworkers include a physician with destructive impulses, a beautiful and androgynous young man who is both cruel and innocent, a gambler who loves money and alcohol, and an intelligent lacquer craftsman. The five men start to build a strange friendship through working together.

== Characters ==
Raizo Kurima (繰馬 雷蔵, Kurima Raizō)
Voiced by: Jun Kasama (Japanese); Aaron Campbell (English)
The main protagonist, a master swordsman whose loyalty to his clan was used to manipulate him into murdering his own fiancée's father. He soon kills the man who arranged the plot, and with nowhere to go after his fiancée kills herself in despair, joins the Revengers who helped him.
Yuen Usui (碓水 幽烟, Usui Yūen)
Voiced by: Yūichirō Umehara (Japanese); Christopher Wehkamp (English)
A soft-spoken handyman whose day job is as a maki-e lacquerware artist. However, he secretly runs the Revengers, a gairaigo corruption of the word "revenge", to help settle the blood debts of those who normally cannot afford to hire a hitman. His preferred method of killing is slapping a sheet of gold lacquer over the target's face until they suffocate. Yuen has a large tattoo of the Virgin Mary covering his back, signifying his faith and his work for an underground Christian group.
Teppa Murakami (叢上 徹破, Murakami Teppa)
Voiced by: Shunsuke Takeuchi (Japanese); Gabe Kunda (English)
A former pirate and current doctor who treats patients from all walks of life, regardless of their ability to pay. He creates and maintains a secret stash of weapons for Revengers, and his massive frame allows him to use heavier weaponry than most people cannot use.
Nio (鳰)
Voiced by: Hisako Kanemoto (Japanese); Hayden Daviau (English)
A small, androgynous boy whose angelic face hides a cruel and calculating mind. His favorite method of assassination involves using kite strings covered in tiny glass shards.
Soji (惣二, Sōji)
Voiced by: Shouta Hayama (Japanese); Nazeeh Tarsha (English)
A self-indulgent gambler who prizes money, alcohol, and women above all else. However, he is surprisingly compassionate when dealing with people he likes. His favorite weapon is a deck of hanafuda cards with thin iron pieces embedded in them, which he throws at enemies' vital points.
Gerald Kanō (ジェラルド 嘉納, Jerarudo Kanō)
Voiced by: Akio Otsuka (Japanese); Kent Williams (English)
An underground Christian priest who preaches out of a half-destroyed chapel in Nagasaki, he gives spiritual guidance and funding to the members of the Revengers.
Jinkurō Isarizawa (漁澤 陣九郎, Isarizawa Jinkurō)
Voiced by: Takehito Koyasu (Japanese); Eric Vale (English)
A government official from the Nagasaki Magistrate's office who takes credit for cracking down on the opium trade within the region, and is known for cavorting with many prostitutes around town. He is quietly manipulating the Revengers for his own ends.
Saimon Shishido (宍戸 斎門, Shishido Saimon)
Voiced by: Nobuhiko Okamoto (Japanese); Stephen Fu (English)
Leader of the Nagasaki Trade Union who seems connected to the local opium trade.
Liu Wen-Lin (劉文霖)
Voiced by: Daisuke Hirakawa (Japanese); Kaiji Tang (English)
Chinatown gang leader attempting to root out the source of the opium in Nagasaki before it spreads into his country. An extremely skilled martial artist who can even take on Kurima bare-handed.
Sada the Pilgrim (遍路の貞, Henro no Sada)
Voiced by: Junichi Suwabe (Japanese); Austin Tindle (English)
A wandering priest who secretly runs a rival group of the Revengers and has fewer qualms about accepting jobs. His group includes Ippachi the Hawkeye, Yotaro the Shuriken and Sute the Tonfa.

== Media ==
=== Anime ===
The anime is directed by Masaya Fujimori and written by Gen Urobuchi of Nitroplus and Renji Ōki, with Jun Futamata composing the music. Jirō Suzuki and Yuushi provided the original character designs, and Yuji Hosogoe is adapting the designs for animation while also serving as chief animation director along with Yuki Nishioka and Emiko Endo. It aired from January 5 to March 23, 2023, on Tokyo MX and other channels. Crunchyroll streamed the series. However, the English dub of episode 3 was delayed due to inclement weather delays in the Dallas area where the series is dubbed.

According to Fujimori, the series is meant to show both Western and Eastern culture, while the style is meant to give the idea of "cool". Urobuchi wrote it with the hope it will properly appeal the audience based on the several concepts he came across. Since getting involved in the project, Urobuchi believed something really good came out. He expressed his interest in the characters' inner thoughts as well as the traditional animation used to properly portrays the clothing like kimono. While silent about it, Urobuchi claims Revenger will use tricky plottwists and also rely on clever strategies. With that in mind, the title of the work also does not contain any hidden meanings. Urobuchi believes Revenger will make an impact, on those who are waiting for a "truly interesting" work.

Based on Urobuchi's comments, Fujimori finds the script is very rich and intriguing so Fujimori finds working on the storyboards to be unbelievably fun. Speaking from Fujimori's own experience with media from his early days, he is trying to recreate the experience of watching period dramas and criminal dramas that aired during the Showa era and update the experience for the present time. Because of looser regulations, New Cinema and macaroni western programs that aired on television back then were full of surprises, and audiences did not know what would happen next. Revenger is well-supported by animation, finishing, background art, and photography. Doing a period drama is very difficult, so he had to bow his head at the work done. The cool and restrained sound production makes the film more mature.

The opening theme song is "Downtimer" (ダウンタイマー, Dauntaimā) by RetBear (unknown Vo: O2), while the ending theme song is "Un_mute" by Maaya Sakamoto. RetBear said that "Downtimer" emphasizes the determination of moving forward despite not being able to properly see the future which fits with the series' ideals of revenge. Sakamoto gives her own perspectives. Sakamoto asked Yūho Iwasato, the lyricist she respects the most, to write the lyrics with the image of wanting to create a song that would envelop and purify the hearts of the characters. Sakamoto was happy that animators created an ending sequence that is calm and gentle to match the song.

==== Episodes ====
No.	Title	Directed by	Written by	Storyboarded by	Original release date
1	"Once Upon a Time in Nagasaki"	Shinpei Matsuo	Gen Urobuchi, Renji Ōki	Masaya Fujimori	January 5, 2023
At night, samurai Raizo Kurima murders Genshin Hirata in cold blood. Before dying, Hirata bites onto a koban, which is then retrieved by an unknown person. The next day, Kurima is briefly approached by Yuen Usui, who runs an odd job service. As a retainer to the daimyo of the Satsuma Clan, Kurima was ordered by his master Jōnoshin Matsumine to kill Hirata for being an opium dealer, but Hirata was also the father of Kurima's fiancée Yui. When Kurima is ambushed by Matsumine's men, Kurima avoids death by jumping off a cliff into the river below, where he is saved by Nio. Waking up in Usui's general merchant store, Kurima is shamefully informed that Matsumine is the true opium dealer while Hirata planned to expose Matsumine. Unveiling Hirata's koban with bite marks, Usui reveals that Hirata hired Usui to avenge his death. Kurima assists Usui and his employees Teppa Murakami, Nio and Soji with infiltrating Tsurumaru Castle. After Usui, Teppa, Nio and Soji use unique attacks to kill Matsumine's men, Kurima finally kills Matsumine in the woods. Rushing to see Yui at her home, Kurima sadly learns that Yui committed suicide after Hirata's funeral.
2	"Gold Opens Any Door"	Masaya Fujimori	Gen Urobuchi, Renji Ōki	Masaya Fujimori	January 12, 2023
As Kurima mourns the death of Yui, Usui reports the success of the mission to his handler Gerald Kanō of the Chapel in Nagasaki. Usui then suggests to Nio and Soji that Kurima should be an official member of the Revengers. Meanwhile, Teppa treats a terminally ill woman named Mana, who then hires the Revengers to kill her husband Inohachi and his boss Tenmokuya for selling her into prostitution. At night, Usui asks Kurima to join the Revengers, an organization which unjustifiably fulfills vendettas for people who are powerless to do so. After visiting a red-light district where Mana's death is being mourned, Kurima eventually decides to join in the mission to kill Inohachi and Tenmokuya. Having received word that Inohachi is being targeted, Tenmokuya has Inohachi's bodyguard Umajiri escort Inohachi from the brothel and leave the city by boat. However, Teppa uses a massive compound bow to kill Umajiri, while Kurima proceeds to slay Inohachi himself. In the brothel, Nio distracts Tenmokuya long enough for Usui to assassinate Tenmokuya. With the mission complete, Teppa leaves flowers at Mana's grave and offers a prayer to her.
3	"Fortune is Fickle and Blind"	Akira Katō	Gen Urobuchi, Renji Ōki	Masaya Fujimori	January 19, 2023
While touring around Nagasaki, both Kurima and Nio eventually witness the corrupt magistrate Shūsui Sakata frame the innocent shopkeeper Kao-ya for smuggling and dealing opium. Teppa arranges for Kurima to be roommates with an annoyed Soji at an inn. Usui then meets with the local government official Jinkurō Isarizawa, though Usui feigns ignorance when Isarizawa wonders where Kurima was last seen after murdering Hirata. Isarizawa then informs Usui that Kao-ya has hired the Revengers to eliminate Sakata and his policemen. Teppa and Nio soon discover from visiting Kao-ya's sickly wife that Sakata has been framing people in order to cover up his own acts of smuggling and dealing opium. Kurima and Soji both volunteer to take on the assignment, wagering full ownership of their room for whoever kills the most of five targets. Assaulting Sakata's residence, both Kurima and Soji manage to swiftly kill two policemen each. Kurima distracts Sakata long enough for Soji to assassinate Sakata. After Kurima saves Soji from another policeman hidden in the closet, their bet ends in a draw as they return home with a newfound mutual respect. Meanwhile, Teppa warns Usui that trouble will be stirred if Kurima continues being involved with the Revengers.
4	"Ask, and You Shall Receive"	Mitsuyo Yokono	Gen Urobuchi, Renji Ōki	Yūta Murano	January 26, 2023
Soji believes that Kurima should get a job, but things do not go well when Kurima tries to be Teppa's assistant at his clinic for the day. Much to Nio's amusement, Soji is disappointed that Kurima has no useful skills other than his swordsmanship. Paying a visit to the Chapel, Usui is informed by Kanō that Sakata's opium suppler Azumi-ya as well as Azumi-ya's mistress must be killed to fulfill revenge from the previous mission. Since the Revengers know where Azumi-ya's mistress lives, Soji appoints Kurima to be on the lookout for Azumi-ya by filling in for an art book store owner on vacation. Kurima passes the time by painting, revealing himself to be an extremely skilled artist. Later that night, Kurima spots Azumi-ya visiting his mistress. After Nio flies a kite as a distraction, Teppa shoots Azumi-ya with his compound bow from a distance, while Usui suffocates Azumi-ya's mistress by placing a sheet of gold lacquer on her face. The next day, the art book store owner returns and generously pays Kurima for a job well done. Impressed by Kurima's realistic painting of a cat, the art book store owner offers to show it to a publisher.
5	"Love Never Dies"	Shinpei Matsuo	Renji Ōki, Gen Urobuchi	Shinpei Matsuo	February 2, 2023
Dōan, the owner of a traveling circus called the Dōan Company, arrives in Nagasaki and promises to display various freak shows to the public. Kurima and Soji are soon alerted by Hana, their landlord's daughter, that her friends Weasel and Badger have gone missing. The next day, Usui is approached by Dōan with the intention of buying back Nio, but Usui flatly refuses the offer and declares that Nio is a human and not a demon. Nio participates in a kite fighting competition, but loses upon seeing Dōan nearby. As Kurima and Soji discover than many mountain children have mysteriously vanished, Usui suspects that the Dōan Company has kidnapped Weasel and Badger since Nio was a former member of the Dōan Company. Meanwhile, Nio secretly visits Weasel and Badger imprisoned in cages, convince them to hire the Revengers. While Kurima, Soji and Teppa each eliminate the Fire-Breathing Daruma, the Uncanny Knife-Thrower and the Mighty Man of Stone, Usui discreetly helps the Terrifying Snake-Woman unlock the cages and free the mountain children. Nio seduces Dōan long enough to personally slay him. The following day, Teppa is reminded by Usui that Nio deserves to live as a human being.
6	"Adversary Advent"	Toshiyuki Sone	Renji Ōki, Gen Urobuchi	Yūta Murano	February 9, 2023
The art book store owner informs Kurima that the publisher has commissioned an illustration for a hanging scroll. Kurima and Soji later fight off Han-Cho Kumo and Dice-Slinger Yasu, two thugs who were paid to capture Kurima. Meanwhile, Isarizawa warns Usui that a Chinatown gang is currently searching for Kurima. In order to atone for his sins involving the deaths of Hirata and Yui, Kurima decides to confront the Chinatown gang alone. However, Usui, Teppa, Nio and Soji must keep an eye on Kurima, knowing that his possible death would expose their scandal. Kurima ends up getting captured on a boat and being interrogated by the Chinatown gang leader Liu Wen-Lin, who leaves on short notice. Usui, Teppa, Nio and Soji raid the boat, defeating all the Chinatown gang members and rescuing Kurima from being tortured. Meanwhile, Liu meets with Saimon Shishido, the leader of the Nagasaki Trade Union, who reveals to Liu that the boat was raided by the Revengers. Kurima tells Usui, Teppa, Nio and Soji that the Chinatown gang is searching for a obscene amount of opium in Nagasaki that Matsumine stashed away before his death.
7	"Rosy Pitfall"	Akira Katō	Renji Ōki	Masaya Fujimori	February 16, 2023
Along with his fellow monks, a young monk named Seiku visits a convent called the Hoenji Temple, which is fronted as a ring for male prostitutes. Seiku befriends a male prostitute named Ichinojo, promising to help him escape. However, the mother superior keeps the male prostitutes under control with opium, injecting Ichinojo with a large dose after he resists smoking it through a pipe. Disillusioned upon seeing Ichinojo addicted to opium, Seiku forces Ichinojo to bite a koban, which will hire the Revengers. At the Hoenji Temple, Nio and Usui eliminate the nuns, while Teppa encourages Kurima to pursue the mother superior. As Kurima runs into Liu and picks a fight, Soji suddenly kills the mother superior with iron-embedded hanafuda. Liu withdraws when he is outnumbered by Kurima, Soji and Teppa. The next day, Seiku looks after the male prostitutes, including Ichinojo. Meanwhile, the Nagasaki Magistrate orders Isarizawa to investigate the Revengers after Shishido presents Sakata's bloodied sock as evidence that Sakata was murdered by the Revengers. Isarizawa privately threatens Shishido not to escalate the opium trade, while Shishido muses that he would bite onto a koban just to spite Isarizawa.
8	"Two of a Trade Never Agree"	Michita Shiraishi	Renji Ōki, Gen Urobuchi	Dashiyo Hatsumi	February 23, 2023
After Kurima finishes a painting of Yui using the pseudonym "Taishin", Usui takes Kurima to a small cottage that will be used as a studio. Despite Usui suggesting for Kurima to bury his past and create a new life, Kurima still wants to gain closure by finding Matsumine's hidden opium. Upon visiting a pub, Kurima eventually storms out after meeting a traveling priest named Sada the Pilgrim, who explains his unsettling philosophy of money influencing life and death. Meanwhile, Kanō instructs Usui to kill Liu before Matsumine's hidden opium is found, though the koban offered is shown to be burnt instead of bitten. Since Usui has grown suspicious of the Chapel, he agrees with Soji's plan of Nio finding someone to bite onto the burnt koban. Elsewhere, Shishido hires Sada, who secretly runs his own group of Revengers, to carry out his grudges. Usui's Revengers infiltrate Liu's manor at night, but Nio ends up getting caught by Liu. Kurima confronts Liu concerning Matsumine's hidden opium. Usui, Teppa and Soji intercept a letter indicating that Liu is an emissary for Lin Zexu, commissioner of the Qing Empire. Liu is suddenly sniped by Ippachi the Hawkeye, a member of Sada's Revengers.
9	"Mutual Understanding"	Mitsuyo Yokono	Renji Ōki	Shinpei Matsuo	March 2, 2023
Soji scares off Yotaro the Shuriken, while Kurima carries Liu to safety. After treating Liu at the clinic, Teppa tells Nio and Soji that the English started selling India-produced opium to the Qing Empire exploitatively in exchange for tea, silk and porcelain. Usui gives Liu some spiked tea in order to force him to rest and recuperate. Soji questions Nio about the validity of their mission by helping Liu instead of killing him. Usui and Teppa conclude that the Chapel is in cahoots with the opium trade. Meanwhile, Shishido hires Sada, Yotaro and Ippachi to finish off the Chinatown gang. After Liu convinces Kurima to take him to Chinatown despite his injured state, Kurima ends up fending off Sute the Tonfa in an alleyway. Recalling when his late sister Xue Mei was killed by opium, Liu is encouraged by Kurima to bite onto a koban before dying. Sada takes on another job from Shishido, who framed Usui's Revengers for the massacre of the Chinatown gang and convinced the Chapel Nun to disavow Usui's Revengers from the Chapel. Shishido then brings Sada into his storehouse, where Shishido reveals that he intends to make Nagasaki as a hub for the opium trade.
10	"Nowhere to Run"	Hidekazu Oka	Renji Ōki	Dashiyo Hatsumi	March 9, 2023
While playing darts, Isarizawa informs Usui that Shishido has framed Usui's Revengers for the massacre of the Chinatown gang. Kurima and Soji are forced into hiding after Ippachi snipes a decoy that Soji planted in the room at the inn. Usui declines Shishido's request in front of three merchants to use his skills as a maki-e lacquerware artist to decorate an unfinished teacup. Shishido notices that the painting of Yui on a hanging scroll expresses grief from the artist Taishin. Usui pays a visit to the Chapel, where Kanō denies being in league with Shishido. Moreover, Kanō believes that Nagasaki is predestined to fall under the influence of opium. Usui leaves after revealing Liu's bitten koban, intending to complete the mission. Later on, Kurima plans to disembowel himself after fulfilling Liu's vendetta, but Usui encourages Kurima to continue painting and broaden his horizons instead. In the gambling den, Soji plays a game of chō-han hosted by the Chapel Nun in casual attire. The Chapel Nun subtly rigs the game in Soji's favor before following him outside towards a shrine wearing a kitsune mask. She hints that it was a payoff for him to find out why Usui is harboring Kurima.
11	"The Die is Cast"	Toshiyuki Sone	Renji Ōki	Masaya Fujimori	March 16, 2023
The Chapel Nun learns that Kanō still believes Usui's Revengers are still useful despite their quirks. Kanō plans on destabilizing Japan in order to establish a Christian state headquartered in Kyushu. Soji later hears the truth as to why Usui inducted Kurima as a member of Usui's Revengers. In the past, Usui was originally hired by Hirata to kill Matsumine, though Usui later had to deliver a hairpin to Yui after Hirata was killed by Kurima. Yui then hired Usui to fulfill her vendetta against Kurima before she committed suicide. However, Usui was unable to fulfill this vendetta after realizing that Kurima was being manipulated. In the present, Soji has a change of heart when Kurima saves him from getting sniped by Ippachi in the streets. Teppa and Nio manage to trace the boxes of opium near an English lighthouse located on a coastal island, but they are detected by Yotaro in the process. At night, Usui's Revengers prepare to assault the lighthouse and face off against Sada's Revengers.
12	"The Sun Always Rises"	Shinpei Matsuo	Renji Ōki	Masaya Fujimori	March 23, 2023
Kurima, Teppa and Soji assault the lighthouse, while Usui and Nio raid Shishido's manor. Soji and Teppa each eventually kill Yotaro and Ippachi, while Usui and Nio eliminate Shishido's subordinates before seeking out to kill Shishido. Kurima fights for his life and finally kills Sada at a cave, where the storehouse containing the boxes of opium is located. After the cave is detonated and the storehouse is destroyed, Usui reports to Kanō that Liu's vendetta has been fulfilled, though Kanō cautions that this newfound peace is only temporary. The Chapel Nun discreetly joins Isarizawa's retinue of prostitutes. Usui, Teppa and Soji toss Yui's bitten koban into the river. Kurima retires to his cottage during the winter, but he is still burdened by his guilt over Yui's death. After traveling back to a bridge where he first met Usui, Kurima is fatally stabbed by Sute, revealed to still be alive. Kurima quietly accepts his death and passes away peacefully, though Usui finds Kurima soon after.

==== Home media ====
Volume	Episodes	Release date	Ref.
1	1–4	26 April 2023	
2	5–8	7 June 2023	
3	9–12	5 July 2023	

=== Manga ===
A manga adaptation by Ryūsei Yamada was serialized in Square Enix's Monthly GFantasy magazine from January 18, 2023, to April 18, 2024. The manga's chapters were collected into two tankōbon volumes released from July 27, 2023, to June 27, 2024.

No.	Release date	ISBN
1	July 27, 2023	978-4-75-758702-1
2	June 27, 2024	978-4-75-759275-9

== Reception ==
Anime Feminist and Anime News Network reviewed the series' premiere with both noting it uses several tropes which Gen Urobuchi is known for. While the setting was found interesting for mixing Oriental and Occidental content in a historical Japan, the lack of female characters was criticized especially due to the suicide of Kurima's fiancée at the end of first episode. Nevertheless, the character designs and animation were praised, fitting especially for the action scene.
