= Yourness =

Japanese pop rock band

- Origin: Fukuoka, Japan
- Genres: Alternative rock; Pop rock
- Years active: 2014–present
- Labels: Hip Land Music
- Members: Yuji Kurokawa; Shohei Koga; Yudai Tanaka; Takahiro Ono
- Website: yourness.jp

Yourness (ユアネス, Yuanesu) is a Japanese four-piece rock band formed in Fukuoka, Japan. The band consists of Yuji Kurokawa (vocals and guitar), Shohei Koga (guitar), Yudai Tanaka (bass), and Takahiro Ono (drums).

== Biography ==
The band’s early days involved Shohei Koga and Yudai Tanaka connecting in high school through a mutual acquaintance on the social media platform Gree, leading to their first studio session and the formation of a cover band. They later enrolled at Fukuoka School of Music & Dance (FSM), where they met Yuji Kurokawa, who was studying in the PA course rather than singing. Koga discovered Kurokawa’s singing talent through school connections and a video of him performing at a high school cultural festival, covering songs by One Ok Rock. Despite Kurokawa’s initial lack of serious musical ambition, the other members’ drive to make a living through music inspired him to commit fully to the band. In 2017, after their original drummer left for Tokyo, Yourness invited Takahiro Ono, a standout drummer from their FSM cohort, to join officially. Ono’s bold personality and skill, demonstrated during a memorable self-introduction at school where he declared his intent to make a living through music, made him a natural fit. This lineup change marked a turning point, accelerating the band’s growth. The band’s name, a portmanteau, was created by combining letters from each member’s name in a group chat, resulting in a unique term that sounds like a real word but exclusively refers to the band when searched online. Initially, the band lacked a clear concept, forming casually to perform live, but their shared ambition to pursue music professionally solidified their direction.

In March 2018, they released their first nationally distributed mini-album, Ctrl+Z, which marked their entry into the broader Japanese music scene. Approximately one month after Ctrl+Z, the band relocated to Tokyo, seeking a better environment for music creation. The move allowed them to focus more on music, free from the demands of part-time jobs that had dominated their time in Fukuoka, while living close to each other in Tokyo helped them adjust to the city and enhance their creative process. The release of Ctrl+Z was followed by a successful tour with sold-out shows and appearances at major summer festivals, which boosted their popularity.

In late 2018, Yourness released their first EP, Shift, which they described as forming a conceptual whole with Ctrl+Z. The EP was crafted to explore a broader sonic palette while reaffirming their identity as a guitar rock band. The title Shift references the computer command, complementing Ctrl+Z (undo), symbolizing a process of revisiting and moving forward from the past.

In 2019, Yourness focused on building their foundation through extensive live performances, including touring with the band Mol-74, and performing with Kami wa Saikoro o Furanai in their hometown of Fukuoka. On November 20, 2019, they released their second EP, entitled ES.

In 2020, Yourness achieved significant milestones, including providing the opening theme "Kago no Naka ni Tori" (The Bird in the Cage) for the anime series Sing "Yesterday" for Me, which became a long-hit on streaming platforms and garnered international attention, with fans from various countries covering it on YouTube despite the language barrier. They also composed, arranged, and performed the instruments on the track "Yakudō" for Maaya Sakamoto, which was used as second theme song for second phase of smartphone game Fate/Grand Order. This marked their first songwriting for another artist, with Sakamoto’s lyrics and direction providing a new perspective on production, influencing Koga’s approach to band work. In November of that year, Yourness released their third EP, Be All Lie, which featured five songs, including the title track with a fully animated music video directed by Koga.

On December 1, 2021, Yourness released their debut full-length album, 6 Case, via Hip Land Music. As their sixth disc overall, the title derives from the initial letters of their previous works, serving as a conceptual summary of their career to date.

In 2023, Maaya Sakamoto invited them to collaborate with her again on her album Kioku no Toshokan, where Koga composed and arranged the song "Taion," while the band handled its instrumentation.

== Band members ==
- Yuji Kurokawa (黒川 侑司, Kurokawa Yūji) – vocals, guitars
- Shohei Koga (古閑 翔平, Koga Shōhei) – guitars, programming
  Also active as Souzoucity under the pseudonym Sho Kamimura (神村 翔, Kamimura Shō).
- Yudai Tanaka (田中 雄大, Tanaka Yūdai) – bass
- Takahiro Ono (小野 貴寛, Ono Takahiro) – drums

== Discography ==
=== Studio albums ===
Title	Details
6 Case	Released: December 1, 2021; Label: Hip Land Music; Formats: CD, digital download

=== Extended plays ===
Title	Details
Ctrl＋Z	Released: March 21, 2018; Label: Hip Land Music; Formats: CD, digital download
Shift	Released: November 21, 2018; Label: Hip Land Music; Formats: CD, digital download
ES	Released: November 20, 2019; Label: Hip Land Music; Formats: CD, digital download
Be All Lie	Released: November 18, 2020; Label: Hip Land Music; Formats: CD, digital download
VII	Released: February 7, 2024; Label: Hip Land Music; Formats: CD, digital download

=== Singles ===
Year	Title	Peak chart positions	Album
Year	Title	JPN	Album
2020	"Kago no Naka ni Tori" (籠の中に鳥, lit. 'The Bird in the Cage')	—	6 Case
2021	"Alles Liebe"	—	6 Case
2021	"Amulet" (アミュレット)	—	6 Case
2021	"49/51" (feat. Nemoi)	—	6 Case
2022	"Arienai yo" (ありえないよ。)	—	'Non-album single'
2022	"Blur"	—	'Non-album single'
2023	"Tsutaetakatta Koto" (伝えたかったこと, lit. 'What I Wanted You to Know')	—	'Non-album single'
2024	"ECG" (feat. Rino)	—	IV
2025	"Tenkyū" (天泣, lit. 'Heaven's Tears')	—	'Non-album single'
2025	"Gen" (眩, lit. 'Dazzling')	—	'Non-album single'
"—" denotes a recording that did not chart or was not released in that territory.
