= Sayuri Horishita =

Japanese singer-songwriter (born 1980)

- Born: January 11, 1980 (age 46); Soma, Fukushima Prefecture, Japan
- Occupation: singer

Sayuri Horishita (堀下さゆり, Horishita Sayuri) is a singer born on January 11, 1980, in Soma, Fukushima Prefecture, Japan. The music video for her song "Kaze no Tōri Michi" aired on the NHK program Minna no Uta and was animated by Tomomi Mochizuki, Katsuya Kondō, and Naoya Tanaka, all three of whom have worked on Studio Ghibli films.

== Discography ==
Listed in reverse chronological order, with newest at the top.

- Lily Pop Life: Complete Songs (リリーポップライフ~complete songs~), July 12, 2006, independent label
- Kaze no Tōri Michi (カゼノトオリミチ), February 16, 2005, BabeStar/Victor
- Ajisai Hatake (あじさい畑), June 4, 2004, independent label
- Private: The Piano Album (プライベート~The Piano Album~), March 15, 2004, independent label
- A Lily Life (リリーライフ), August 5, 2002, independent label
