= Shirō Sasaki =

Japanese music producer

Shirō Sasaki (佐々木 史朗, Sasaki Shirō; born December 30, 1958) (Note: Not to be confused with the film producer of the same name, Shirō Sasaki (佐々木 史朗), born 1939) is a Japanese anime producer and music producer. Formerly an employee of Victor Entertainment, he founded and has been the representative director of its sublabel, Flying Dog, since its inception in 2007. In his time working as a music producer and project developer he's helped launch the careers of musicians Yoko Kanno, Yuki Kajiura, May'n and singer and voice actress Maaya Sakamoto.

== Staff in ==
- Noir (2001)
