= Nina (Maaya Sakamoto song) =

- Standard edition cover

Single by Maaya Sakamoto
- Language: Japanese
- B-side: "Sekai no Himitsu"
- Released: October 10, 2024
- Genre: J-pop; anime song
- Length: 4:33
- Label: FlyingDog
- Composer: Yūsuke Shirato
- Lyricist: Maaya Sakamoto
- Producer: Maaya Sakamoto

Maaya Sakamoto singles chronology
"Dakishimete" (2024)	"Nina" (2024)	"Drops" (2025)

Music video
- "Nina" on YouTube

"Nina" (stylized in lowercase) is a song by Japanese singer and voice actress Maaya Sakamoto. Co-written by Sakamoto and Yūsuke Shirato, the song served as the opening theme for the television anime series Nina the Starry Bride. It was released as a digital single on October 10, 2024, and on physical formats on November 6 of the same year, by FlyingDog.

== Background and release ==
"Nina" was specifically written for Nina the Starry Bride, a fantasy anime centered on an orphan named Nina who assumes the identity of a deceased princess. Production began approximately a year prior to its release, when Sakamoto was commissioned to provide the theme song for the series. Reading the Nina manga and hearing the director’s request for a "bright and energetic" song, Sakamoto began envisioning a song reminiscent of her 2009 single "Magic Number." The song also marks the first collaboration between Sakamoto and Yūsuke Shirato, known for works like "Sekai ni wa Ai Shika Nai" by Keyakizaka46 (now Sakurazaka46) and The Idolmaster series. Sakamoto described their collaboration as surprisingly seamless, relaxed and familiar creative process, despite it being their first time working together.

Sakamoto explained her decision for naming the song after the anime protagonist by stating: "I felt that it was very important for her to be called by her true name, so in keeping with that sentiment, I titled the theme song 'Nina' as well." She declared this decision felt like a fresh, almost retro nod to classic anime songs, a move she had not previously made in her tie-in works.

The song was first announced in July 2024, along with details of the anime.

The physical single of "Nina" was released on November 6, 2025, on two formats: regular and limited edition, the latter including a Blu-ray with live footage of three songs from Sakamoto’s performance at the Kyoto Music Expo 2023 in Umenomichi Park, including a notable collaboration with Shigeru Kishida of Quruli on the song "Sumire". The single includes the b-side "Sekai no Himitsu," which features lyrics by Yumi Uchimura of the rock band La La Larks, and was composed and arranged by Swedish producer Rasmus Faber, reuniting with Sakamoto for the first time since their collaboration on "Waiting for the Rain" nine years prior.

== Composition and themes ==
"Nina" was created to capture the essence of the anime’s protagonist, who is depicted as a character determined to shape her own future despite being swayed by fate. Sakamoto described the song as one that inspires listeners to "hold their head high and move forward," aiming to evoke a sense of empowerment and resilience. Sakamoto explained that crafting such a straightforwardly positive song required balancing the expectations with her perspective as a 44-year-old artist, avoiding a forced tone. She commented: "Expressing such straightforward brightness and positivity through lyrics and sound is something that comes from the anime itself. I’ve always sensed that longtime fans expect this kind of song from me [...] but that kind of vibrancy does not come easily from my everyday life." Thus, Sakamoto aimed for a gentler approach in "Nina," shifting from the traditional approach to uplifting songs with themes such as “push harder!” or “you can do more!”, to more gentler messages like “this moment is not everything, and mistakes are not the end,” reflecting a mature evolution in her approach to this type of song.

== Music video ==
The music video, directed by Yasuyuki Yamaguchi, was published on YouTube on October 10, 2025. The music video’s concept centers on a car and motorcycle chase exploring Sakamoto’s identity, featuring intense car battle scenes with a stylish and tense atmosphere.

== Commercial performance ==
"Nina" debuted at number 11 on the Oricon Weekly Singles Chart, selling 3,743 copies on its first week. The single charted for three weeks, with reported sales totaling 4,604 copies.

== Track listing ==
All lyrics are written by Maaya Sakamoto.

Nina - digital single
No.	Title	Lyrics	Music & Arrangement	Length
1.	"Nina"	Maaya Sakamoto	Yūsuke Shirato	4:49
Total length:				4:49

Nina - CD single
No.	Title	Lyrics	Music & Arrangement	Length
1.	"Nina"	Sakamoto	Yusuke Shirato	4:49
2.	"Sekai no Himitsu" (世界のひみつ)	Yumi Uchimura	Rasmus Faber	4:27
3.	"Nina" (TV size)			1:31
4.	"Nina" (Instrumental)			4:33
5.	"Sekai no Himitsu" (Instrumental)			4:25
Total length:				19:29

== Charts ==
=== Weekly charts ===
Weekly chart performance for "Nina"
Chart (2024)	Peak position
Japan (Oricon)	11
Japan Anime Singles (Oricon)	1
Japan Top Singles Sales (Billboard Japan)	11

=== Monthly charts ===
Monthly chart performance for "Nina"
Chart (2024)	Position
Japan (Oricon)	37
Japan Anime Singles (Oricon)	10

== Personnel ==
Credits adapted from the liner notes of the CD single.

- Maaya Sakamoto – songwriting, vocals, backing vocals, production
- Yusuke Shirato – songwriting, arrangements, programming
- Junya Yamamoto – drums
- Hirō Yamaguchi – bass
- Sho Horisaki – guitar
- Kento Ohgiya – piano, organ
- Koichiro Muroya Strings – strings
