= Duets (Maaya Sakamoto album) =

Compilation album by Maaya Sakamoto
- Released: March 17, 2021
- Genre: J-pop; Anime song
- Label: FlyingDog
- Producer: Maaya Sakamoto

Maaya Sakamoto chronology
Single Collection+ Achikochi (2020)	Duets (2021)	Kioku no Toshokan (2023)

Duets is a concept album by Japanese voice actress and singer Maaya Sakamoto, released on March 17, 2021, by FlyingDog. The album is Sakamoto's fourth concept album and second 25th anniversary album, and consists entirely of duet songs, featuring collaborations with seven different artists.

== Background and release ==
The concept for Duets originated from a suggestion by Shiro Sasaki, the president of FlyingDog, Sakamoto's record label. During a casual conversation at Sasaki's 60th birthday celebration, he expressed regret over not having pursued a duet album for Sakamoto earlier in her career. Sasaki, who served as Sakamoto's director during her debut twenty five years prior, planted the idea that sparked the project. Initially, Sakamoto dismissed the suggestion lightly, but the concept lingered, prompting her to consider potential duet partners and the possibilities of duet songs. The creative process began with the question, "Who to sing with?,” and the result was a lineup of seven individuals deeply connected to Sakamoto’s life and career, from artists who’ve supported her musical journey to actors she’s shared the stage with and singers she’s long admired. She commented: "[Sasaki] was my director 25 years ago when I debuted, and I’d never heard this idea back then, so I initially brushed it off [...] But the thought stuck with me. I started wondering who I’d enjoy singing with and what kind of duet songs are out there. Gradually, I realized it could be something really interesting, so about two years ago, we decided to make it happen as part of my 25th anniversary celebration."

The creative process began with the question, "Who to sing with?,” and the result was a lineup of seven individuals deeply connected to Sakamoto’s life and career, from artists who’ve supported her musical journey to actors she’s shared the stage with and singers she’s long admired. The recording process was influenced by the COVID-19 pandemic, which limited in-person interactions and inspired themes of connection and shared experiences. The album emphasizes the collaborative nature of duets, allowing Sakamoto to explore new creative dimensions through vocal harmonies and shared storytelling. She described the process as akin to writing a play, with each song creating a narrative driven by the interplay of two voices. Each track of the album highlights the unique interactions between Sakamoto and her duet partners. The album blends various genres, including pop, Motown-inspired sounds, electro, rock, and classical influences, reflecting the distinct styles of the contributing artists.

== Composition and themes ==
"When I was still in high school, [Wada] was so kind to me—a true gentleman singer. Later, after parting ways with Yoko Kanno’s productions, he composed and arranged my first single, “Loop.” He’s been there at key moments over these 25 years, watching me grow [...] He’s fully dedicated to his work as H-Wonder, composing and arranging, and hasn’t sung as Hiroshi Wada in about 22 years. So when I asked him to sing again, he was quite surprised and didn’t take it seriously at first [...] I genuinely loved his albums as a teenager —I listened to the CDs he gave me until they were practically worn out— so I purely wanted to sing with him if he’d perform again. For him, it was like getting a random offer to sing after all these years, but he responded to my enthusiasm. He said, “If I’m going to do this, I need at least a year to prepare properly.”

– Sakamoto on Hiroki Wada and his involvement in Duets, Music Voice

The first artist Sakamoto approached to do a duet with was Hiroki Wada, whom she has a connection with since the time of her debut in 1996, when they both performed the theme songs for the anime The Vision of Escaflowne. (Note: Maaya Sakamoto performed “Yakusoku wa Iranai”, the opening time for The Vision of Escaflowne, while Wada contributed the ending theme for the series, “Mystic Eyes”.) Despite having a prolific career creating music for other artists as H-Wonder, Wada had not sung publicly in 22 years, and was persuaded by Sakamoto's earnest request. This led to they co-writing the song "Duet!," which became the leading track and the thematic heart of the album, and whose lyrics delve into the essence of singing together and the unique discoveries it brings. Sakamoto connected this song to her debut, making their collaboration a nostalgic reunion after twenty five years.

“Anata Janakereba,” performed with Kohei Dojima, is a Motown-inspired pop song. Sakamoto requested to Dojima a mature love song with a lived-in perspective, avoiding overly sentimental tones. Dojima crafted a narrative with two distinct characters, culminating in a lyrical twist on the phrase “If It’s Not You.” The song’s vibrant brass and pop sensibility were shaped through close collaboration, building on their connection from the 2014 Yano Music Festival. “Hitokuchi Ikaga?” with Asako Toki, featuring Toki’s lyrics and Tendre’s electro composition, portrays a conversational scene of two women sharing drinks. Developed through an online meeting due to pandemic restrictions, the song’s nostalgic tone reflects the longing for ordinary social moments, with its conversational structure sparked by Toki’s suggestion of the title phrase. “Demo,” with Masakazu Hara of The Band Apart, blends Hara’s mixture-style music and Yuho Iwasato’s lyrics, exploring the contrast between youthful ideals of changing the world and the realities of adulthood. Sakamoto, drawn to Hara’s distinctive live backing vocals, convinced him to sing despite his initial nonchalance. The reflective tone resonated with her own maturity after 25 years, with production emphasizing Hara’s unique sound.

“Sync,” a fast-paced rock tune with Tomomi Uchimura of La La Larks, features lyrics co-written by both artists and music by Ryo Eguchi. Created via Line exchanges while Sakamoto was performing in a musical, the song is an anthem for resilience, inspired by the shared solitude of performing. Uchimura’s quick demo recordings helped shape its bold, uplifting tone, reflecting their close friendship and mutual experiences. “Hoshi to Hoshi no Aida,” with Yoshio Inoue, was written and composed by Sakamoto with arrangements by Ryuji Yamamoto, balancing classical and pop elements. Drawing from their long collaboration in musicals like Daddy Long Legs, Sakamoto crafted a personal song about connecting across distances, avoiding overly dramatic tones. The challenging composition process, her first for a duet, highlighted Inoue’s down-to-earth charm. Finally, “Hitotsu Yane no Shita,” with Kyoko Koizumi, features Sakamoto’s lyrics, Shōko Suzuki’s music, and Yamamoto’s arrangements, with Suzuki adding backing vocals. Inspired by their shared experiences of pet loss, the song explores the profound bond between a person and their pet. Sakamoto, a longtime fan of Koizumi’s essays, approached her nervously but was met with enthusiasm, resulting in an emotional recording where Koizumi’s warm, expressive vocals brought the pet’s perspective to life.

== Chart performance ==
Single Collection+ Achikochi debuted at number 14 on the Oricon Weekly Albums chart, selling 6,844 copies on its first week.

== Track listing ==
Duets track listing
No.	Title	Lyrics	Music	Arrangement	Length
1.	"Duet!" (with Hiroki Wada)	Maaya Sakamoto	H-Wonder	H-Wonder	3:57
2.	"Anata Janakereba" (あなたじゃなければ; If It's Not You) (with Kohei Dojima)	Kohei Dojima	Dojima	Dojima; Sugarbeans	4:02
3.	"Hitokuchi Ikaga?" (ひとくちいかが?; Do You Want a Bite?) (with Asako Toki)	Asako Toki	Tendre	Tendre	5:18
4.	"Demo" (でも; But) (with Masakazu Hara of The Band Apart)	Yuho Iwasato	Masakazu Hara	Hara	4:00
5.	"Sync" (with Yumi Uchimura of La La Larks)	Uchimura; Sakamoto	Ryo Eguchi	Eguchi	4:40
6.	"Hoshi to Hoshi no Aida" (星と星のあいだ; Between the Stars) (with Tomio Inoue)	Sakamoto	Sakamoto	Ryūji Yamamoto	4:33
7.	"Hitotsu Yane no Shita" (ひとつ屋根の下; Beneath One Roof) (with Kyoko Koizumi)	Sakamoto	Shōko Suzuki	Yamamoto	4:56
Total length:					53:11
