= Be a Flower =

2023 single by Ryokuoushoku Shakai

- Standard edition cover

Single by Ryokuoushoku Shakai

from the album Channel U
- Language: Japanese
- B-side: "Dream, Devil & Fantasy"
- Released: December 6, 2023
- Studio: Sony Music (Tokyo, Japan)
- Genre: rock
- Length: 3:20
- Label: Epic Japan
- Composer: Shingo Anami
- Lyricist: Haruko Nagaya

Ryokuoushoku Shakai singles chronology
"Summer Time Cinderella" (2023)	"Be a Flower" (2023)	"Party!!" (2024)

Alternative cover
- Limited edition cover, featuring Jinshi and Maomao

Music video
- "Be a Flower" on YouTube

"Be a Flower" (Note: Stylized as Be a flower and sometimes written as "花になって - Be a flower". Originally titled in Japanese as "花になって".) (Japanese: 花になって, Hepburn: Hana ni Natte) is a song by Japanese pop rock band Ryokuoushoku Shakai. It was released on December 6, 2023, by Epic Records Japan, as the theme song for the Nippon TV anime The Apothecary Diaries. Commercially, it peaked at number 8 on the Oricon Singles Chart and the Billboard Japan Hot 100.

== Release ==
On October 1, 2023, it was announced that Ryokuoushoku Shakai would be releasing "Be a Flower" as the theme song for the Nippon TV anime series The Apothecary Diaries, set to start broadcasting on October 22. They then announced that it would be released as a single on December 6, with advance distribution starting on October 29. The first press limited edition includes a Blu-ray with footage from their Pink Blue album tour 2023 as well as a photobook with images from the tour, and the limited edition includes a Blu-ray with the non-credit opening video of The Apothecary Diaries as well as a digipak with original illustrations from the anime. The music video was released on November 15.

The B-side "Dream, Devil & Fantasy" was released to commemorate the 30th anniversary of ZIP-FM, and was aired there from October 31 to December 5.

== Recording and production ==
"Be a Flower" was composed by Shingo Anami, who first created the last piano phrase on the guitar and then wrote the melody. The clap at the beginning of the song was inspired by the manga of The Apothecary Diaries, which had a "continental Asia feeling". Production of the song began in early 2023, with recording in January when the band's album Pink Blue was being produced. Anami and Keita Kawaguchi co-arranged the song. Originally, Anami made a "thick rock sound", but Kawaguchi added traditional Chinese sounds like the erhu and gong. The team for the anime suggested self-love as a theme for the lyrics, and Nagaya wrote the lyrics with this theme by connecting it to Maomao, the protagonist of The Apothecary Diaries, whom she described as the opposite of a typical protagonist.

"Dream, Devil & Fantasy" evolved from a melody that Peppe and Shingo Anami had created in 2021 and was inspired by musical songs. Before writing the lyrics, Issei Kobayashi wrote a short story about "a young man who forgot his dreams", and the lyrics were adapted from the short story. Initially, the song ended with Nagaya singing, but the arranger Lastorder extended it to 30 seconds, and the song ended with piano.

== Track listing ==
Be a Flower standard edition
No.	Title	Lyrics	Music	Arrangement	Length
1.	"Be a Flower" (花になって, Hana ni Natte)	Haruko Nagaya	Shingo Anami	Keita Kawaguchi; Anami	3:20
2.	"Dream, Devil & Fantasy" (夢と悪魔とファンタジー, Yume to Akuma to Fantaji)	Issei Kobayashi	Peppe; Anami	Lastorder; Anami	4:30
3.	"Be a Flower" (花になって, Hana ni Natte (instrumental)		Anami	Kawaguchi; Anami	3:20
4.	"Dream, Devil & Fantasy" (夢と悪魔とファンタジー, Yume to Akuma to Fantaji (instrumental)		Peppe; Anami	Lastorder; Anami	4:28
Total length:					15:38

Be a Flower limited edition – disc 2 (Blu-ray)
No.	Title	Length
1.	"TV anime The Apothecary Diaries non-credit opening movie"	1:31
Total length:		17:06

Be a Flower first press limited edition – disc 2 (Blu-ray) (Note: First press limited edition cover is the same as the standard edition cover, but with a new page for background, replacing old writing paper)
No.	Title	Length
1.	"Behind the Scenes from Pink Blue tour 2023"	39:55
Total length:		55:29

== Personnel ==
=== Be a Flower ===
Ryokuoushoku Shakai

- Haruko Nagaya – lyrics, lead vocals, guitar
- Issei Kobayashi – chorus, guitar
- Peppe – chorus, keyboard
- Shingo Anami – music, chorus, bass, arrangement, programming

Supporting

- Keita Kawaguchi – arrangement, programming
- Hiroshi Kido – drums

=== Dream, Devil & Fantasy ===
Ryokuoushoku Shakai

- Haruko Nagaya – lead vocals, guitar
- Issei Kobayashi – lyrics, chorus, guitar
- Peppe – music, chorus, keyboard
- Shingo Anami – music, chorus, bass, arrangement

Supporting

- Lastorder – arrangement, programming
- Osamu Hidai – drums

=== Production ===
- Nobuyuki Murakami – recording engineer, mixing engineer
- Mitsuyasu Abe – mastering engineer

=== Studios ===
- All songs recorded / mixed / mastered at Sony Music Studios (Tokyo, Japan)

== Accolades ==
Awards and nominations for "Be a Flower"
Ceremony	Year	Award	Result	Ref.
Reiwa Anisong Awards	2023	Artist Song Award	Nominated	

== Charts ==
=== Weekly charts ===
Weekly chart performance for "Be a Flower"
Chart (2023–2024)	Peak position
Global Excl. US (Billboard)	170
Japan (Japan Hot 100)	8
Japan Hot Animation (Billboard Japan)	4
Japan (Oricon)	8
Japan Combined Singles (Oricon)	5
Japan Anime Singles (Oricon)	3

=== Year-end charts ===
2023 year-end chart performance for "Be a Flower"
Chart (2023)	Position
Japan Download Songs (Billboard Japan)	61

2024 year-end chart performance for "Be a Flower"
Chart (2024)	Position
Japan (Japan Hot 100)	17
Japan Hot Animation (Billboard Japan)	8

== Certifications ==
Certifications for "Be a Flower"
Region	Certification	Certified units/sales
Japan (RIAJ) Digital	Gold	100,000^{*}
Streaming
Japan (RIAJ)	2× Platinum	200,000,000^{†}
^{*} Sales figures based on certification alone.^{†} Streaming-only figures based on certification alone.
