= Tokei (song) =

Single by Maaya Sakamoto
- Language: Japanese
- Released: December 28, 2025
- Genre: J-pop; anime song
- Length: 5:32
- Label: FlyingDog
- Songwriter: Maaya Sakamoto
- Producer: Maaya Sakamoto

Maaya Sakamoto singles chronology
"Drops" (2025)	"Tokei" (2025)

Music video
- "Tokei (Short Version)" on YouTube "Tokei" on YouTube

"Tokei" (時計; lit. 'Clock') is a song by Japanese singer and voice actress Maaya Sakamoto. Written by Sakamoto herself, the song served as the theme song for the final chapter of the smartphone role-playing game Fate/Grand Order, and was released as a digital single on December 28, 2025.

== Background and release ==
Since releasing "Shikisai" in 2015, Sakamoto was involved with the Fate/Grand Order franchise for over a decade, both as a singer and as a cast member. "Clock" became her sixth and last music contribution to the series, following "Dokuhaku" released in 2020. The request for this new track came from Kinoko Nasu at the end of 2022. Production began after discussions in spring 2023. Sakamoto expressed a strong desire to personally handle the lyrics and composition for the song, marking the culmination of her work on the series' final chapter.

The song was first announced via Sakamoto's official X account on December 27, while the song became available on streaming services the following day.

== Composition and themes ==
"Tokei" was described as an "emotional track" depicting "hope for the future". When first approached by Kinoko Nasu, Sakamoto initially envisioned a dark ballad to be the ending theme for the Fate/Grand Order game; however, Nasu requested "an up-tempo song starting in darkness and ending with a sense of hope". Struggling with this direction, the track's composition took about one and a half years before its completion. The arrangement was handled by Ryo Eguchi, member of La La Larks who previously composed and arranged "Shikisai" and arranged "Gyakkō".

== Music videos ==
The animated music video for "Tokei" was published on YouTube on December 29, 2025. A live-action music video featuring Sakamoto was published on YouTube on March 31, 2026.

== Charts ==
Chart performance for "Tokei"
Chart (2026)	Peak position
Japan Hot 100 (Billboard Japan)	95
Japan Download Songs (Billboard Japan)	5
Japan Digital Singles (Oricon)	4
