= 65th Japan Record Awards =

2023 Japanese music award show

- Date: 30 December 2023
- Location: New National Theatre Tokyo
- Hosted by: Ana Haruna Kawaguchi; Shinichiro Azumi

Television/radio coverage
- Network: TBS

The Japan Record Awards (第65回日本レコード大賞, Dai Rokugo Yon-kai Nihon Rekōdo Taishō) was held on December 30th, 2023.

Nominations and awards were announced on November 21st, 2023.

== Presenters ==
- Ana Haruna Kawaguchi
- Shinichiro Azumi (TBS announcer)

== Winners ==
=== Grand Prix ===
- Mrs. GREEN APPLE – "Que Sera Sera"
  - Artist: Mrs. GREEN APPLE
  - Lyrics: Motoki Ohmori
  - Music: Motoki Ohmori
  - Arranger: Ryo Hanai & Motoki Ohmori

=== Excellent Works Award ===
- Atarashii Gakko! – "Otona Blue"
- Mrs. GREEN APPLE – "Que Sera Sera"
- Ryokuoushoku Shakai – "Summer Time Cinderella"
- Junretsu – "Datte Meguri Aetanda"
- NewJeans – "Ditto"
- JO1 – "Trigger"
- imase – "Night Dancer"
- Ichikawa Yukino – "Hanawazurai"
- Ado – "Show"
- BE:FIRST – "Mainstream"

=== Best New Artist Award ===
- FRUITS ZIPPER

=== New Artist Awards ===
- Tetsuji Kimura
- FRUITS ZIPPER
- Boku ga Mitakatta Aozora
- Lil League from Exile Tribe

=== Best Vocal Performance ===
- JUJU

=== Special Award ===
- ano
- Jujutsu Kaisen
- NewJeans

=== Japan Composer's Association Award ===
- Yuto Tatsumi

=== Special Achievement Awards ===
- Shizuka Ijūin (lyricist)
- Hiroshi Inuzuka (guitarist, bassist)
- Junko Ohashi (singer)
- KAN (singer, songwriter)
- Ryotaro Konishi (producer)
- Ryuichi Sakamoto (composer)
- Atsuji Sakurai (singer)
- Yukihiro Takahashi (drummer)
- Jiro Takemura (arranger)
- Shinji Tanimura (singer, songwriter)
- Toyama Ichi (singer)
- Tokuko Miura (lyricist)
- Monta Yoshinori (singer, lyricist)

=== Special International Music Award ===
- ENHYPEN
- YOASOBI
