= Sing Along =

Sing Along may refer to:

- A sing-along (community or group singing)

== Music ==
- Singalong (album), 2020 album by Ryokuoushoku Shakai
- "Sing-A-Long" (Shanks & Bigfoot song)
- "Sing Along" (Rodney Atkins song)
- "Sing Along" (Per Gessle song)
- "Sing Along", a song by Jimmy Dean, theme song to the music television show Sing Along with Mitch
- "Sing-A-Long", a song by alternative rock band A from their 1997 debut album How Ace Are Buildings
- Wee Sing Sing-Alongs, a 1990 album of the Wee Sing series

== Film ==
- Sing Along with Me, a 1952 British musical film
- Disney Sing-Along Songs, a series of videos, laserdiscs and DVDs featuring music from various Disney films and TV shows to sing along to
- Sing Along, a 1987 Sesame Street home video
