= Drops (song) =

- Standard edition cover

Single by Maaya Sakamoto
- Language: Japanese
- B-side: "Twilight"
- Released: April 2, 2025
- Genre: J-pop; anime song
- Length: 5:02
- Label: FlyingDog
- Composer: Naoto Kiyota
- Lyricist: Yuho Iwasato
- Producer: Maaya Sakamoto

Maaya Sakamoto singles chronology
"Nina" (2024)	"Drops" (2025)	"Tokei" (2025)

Music video
- "Drops" on YouTube

"Drops" is a song by Japanese singer and voice actress Maaya Sakamoto. Co-written by Yuho Iwasato and Naoto Kiyota, the song served as the opening theme for the television anime series Once Upon a Witch's Death, which began airing on April 1, 2025. The song was released as a digital single on April 2, 2025, and on physical formats on May 21 of the same year, by FlyingDog.

== Background and release ==
"Drops" was specifically written for Once Upon a Witch's Death, a fantasy anime centered on Meg, a 17-year-old apprentice witch, who is cursed by her mentor with a prophecy that she has only one year left to live, and to break the curse she has to bring happiness to those around her, collecting "joyful tears" of one thousand people within a year. Sakamoto commented that when she first found out about the story premise during the first production meeting, keywords like "remaining lifespan" and "tears" initially suggested her a melancholic tone for the theme song, the director surprised her by saying, "For the opening theme, please make it as lively and energetic as possible," aligned with the protagonist's personality. She added: "As I learned more about the story, I realized it was not about consuming tears or life as simple sentimentality —it is a work that turns your gaze toward life precisely because death exists. From there, I wanted to make a song that gives listeners a surge of energy when they hear it."

The song's music was composed by Naoto Kiyota, marking his first collaboration with Sakamoto. Sakamoto selected the demo submitted by Kiyota among several demos by several composers, as she felt it matched best the production team's idea for the theme song. She further revealed that she did not actually met Kiyota in person during recording, becoming the first time she had released a song without ever meeting the composer. As for the lyrics, Sakamoto approached long-time collaborator Yuho Iwasato, whom she most recently had worked with on "Un_mute" and "Taion." Sakamoto revealed that she provided her with the song and the anime script, giving her creative freedom to come up with the lyrics. The arrangement was handled by Shin Kono, a longtime arranger for Sakamoto’s music. Kono refined Kiyota's demo while preserving elements like the intro guitar riff.

The song was first announced in February 2025, along with details of the anime. A portion of the song was also revealed in the anime's first main promotional video. The full track was digitally released on April 2, 2025, with its music video premiering on the same day.

The physical single was released on May 21, 2025. The CD includes a B-side track titled "Twilight", with lyrics co-written by Sakamoto and Iwasato, which their first co-writing effort in 28 years since "Feel Myself included on Sakamoto's first album, Grapefruit. The track, composed and arranged by Tomoya Kawasaki, is an electro-style song described as exploring new stylistic territory for Sakamoto.

== Composition and themes ==
"Nina" was created to capture the essence of the anime’s protagonist. The song's lyrics emphasize a celebration of life over the mere motif of tears, and convey a sense of permission to cry or fall apart while pushing listeners forward, evoking the "joyful tears" central to the anime's plot.

== Music video ==
The music video for Drops, directed by Yasuyuki Yamaguchi, premiered via YouTube on April 2, 2025. It focuses on the theme of "drops," using motifs of tears, water, and droplets to express various emotions such as sadness, joy, and regret through rhythmic visuals and art direction. A key scene features Sakamoto performing in a space filled with balloon installations evoking raindrops, alongside six percussionists.

== Commercial performance ==
"Drops" debuted at number 7 on the Oricon Weekly Singles Chart, selling 5,830 copies on its first week. The single charted for three weeks, with reported sales totaling 6,307 copies.

== Track listing ==
Drops - digital single
No.	Title	Lyrics	Music	Music & Arrangement	Length
1.	"Drops"	Yuho Iwasato	Naoto Kiyota	Shin Kono	5:02
Total length:					5:02

Drops - CD single
No.	Title	Lyrics	Music	Music & Arrangement	Length
1.	"Drops"	Yuho Iwasato	Naoto Kiyota	Shin Kono	5:02
2.	"Twilight"	Maaya Sakamoto; Iwasato	Tomoya Kawasaki	Kawasaki	4:26
3.	"Drops" (TV size)				1:34
4.	"Drops" (Instrumental)				5:02
5.	"Twilight" (Instrumental)				4:24
Total length:					20:28

== Personnel ==
Credits adapted from the liner notes of the CD single.

- Maaya Sakamoto – vocals, backing vocals, production
- Yuho Iwasato – songwriting
- Naoto Kiyota – songwriting

== Charts ==
=== Weekly charts ===
Weekly chart performance for "Drops"
Chart (2025)	Peak position
Japan (Oricon)	7
Japan Anime Singles (Oricon)	2
Japan Top Singles Sales (Billboard Japan)	10
Japan Download Songs (Billboard Japan)	93

=== Monthly charts ===
Monthly chart performance for "Drops"
Chart (2025)	Position
Japan (Oricon)	27
Japan Anime Singles (Oricon)	8
