= Ryokuoushoku Shakai =

Japanese pop rock band

Ryokuoushoku Shakai 緑黄色社会
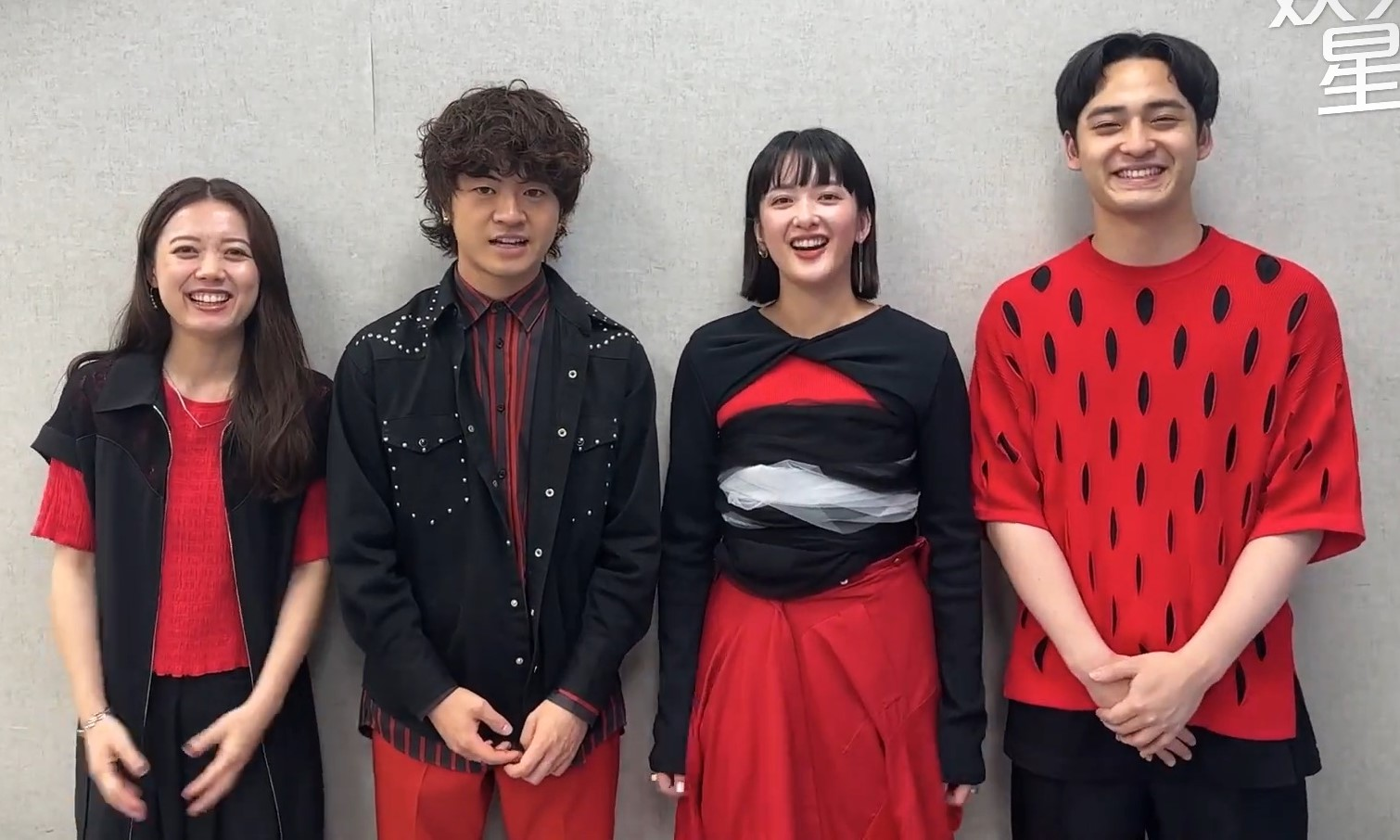
- Ryokuoushoku Shakai on SET News in 2023; From left to right: Peppe, Shingo Anami, Haruko Nagaya, and Issei Kobayashi

Background information
- Also known as: Ryokushaka (リョクシャカ)
- Origin: Aichi Prefecture
- Genres: Pop rock; J-pop
- Years active: 2012–present
- Labels: Tower Records; Epic Records Japan
- Members: Haruko Nagaya; Issei Kobayashi; Peppe; Shingo Anami
- Past members: Natsumi Amano; Yasuchika Sugie
- Website: ryokushaka.com

Ryokuoushoku Shakai (Japanese: 緑黄色社会, Hepburn: Ryokuōshoku Shakai; lit. 'green-yellow society'), abbreviated as Ryokushaka (リョクシャカ), is a Japanese pop rock band formed in 2012 in Aichi Prefecture. The band consists of vocalist and guitarist Haruko Nagaya, guitarist Issei Kobayashi, keyboardist Peppe, and bassist Shingo Anami. Originally a five-member group, drummer Yasuchika Sugie left in December 2015.

== Career ==
=== 2011–2015: Formation ===
In 2011, the band was formed from their high school's light music club. Before entering the school, Haruko Nagaya and Issei Kobayashi had connected on social media, discussing joining the club. Both wanted to be the lead vocalist, but ultimately Nagaya was given the position. Peppe, the keyboardist, joined the band after Nagaya invited her to the high school entrance ceremony. Natsumi Amano, the bassist for the club, left after a month, so Kobayashi invited his childhood friend Shingo Anami, who decided to join after hearing Nagaya sing. They held their first live performance on July 4, 2012, which became the band's founding anniversary. The band's name was derived from the members mishearing "green-yellow vegetables" (緑黄色野菜, ryokuoushoku yasai) as "green-yellow society" (緑黄色社会, ryokuoushoku shakai) after a member pointed out the vegetable juice Nagaya was drinking. In 2013, they participated in the music festival Senkou Riot, placing as runner-up in the grand prix. On December 10, 2015, drummer Yasuchika Sugie left the band.

=== 2017–present: Major label debut ===
On January 11, 2017, their first extended play (EP) Nice To Meet You?? was released nationwide by Tower Records. Nagaya and Peppe modeled for Tower Records' apparel brand, Wearthemusic. Ryokuoushoku Shakai held their one-man live in Nagoya on April 7.

On March 14, 2018, the band released their eponymous first studio album. The song "Little Singer", based on En Okita's novel Kimi ni Todoke, Hajime no Uta (きみに届け、始まりの歌 (lit. 'Sending to You, Song of Beginning')), was completed in June and released on August 4. On August 5, Ryokuoushoku Shakai appeared at the Rock in Japan Festival. The band made their major label debut under Epic Records Japan on November 7 with their EP Afureta Mizu no Yukue.

The band released their EP Shiawase on May 29, 2019. Ryokuoushoku Shakai's official fan club "Milestone" opened on November 5.

On April 22, 2020, the band's first studio album Singalong was released digitally; the physical release was scheduled to be on the same day, but due to the declaration of a state of emergency during the COVID-19 pandemic, it was postponed until September 30. One of the songs on the album, "Mela!", became the band's first song to exceed 300 million streaming views, and was certified double platinum by the Recording Industry Association of Japan. On July 24, they streamed a live concert titled "Singalong Tour 2020: Natsu wo Ikiru", where they performed their new song "Natsu wo Ikiru" for the first time.

From May 23, 2021, the band embarked on their first hall tour, Ryokushaka Keikaku 2021. Their single "Litmus" was released on August 25, and its music video won the Best Rock Video at the 2021 MTV Video Music Awards Japan.

Their third studio album, Actor, was released on January 26, 2022, accompanied by the Actor Tour 2022, which commenced on March 20 with 20 performances at 19 venues throughout Japan. On July 4, marking the tenth anniversary of the group's formation, the single "Breath" was released. The band held their inaugural solo concerts on September 16 and 17 at the Nippon Budokan, with a total attendance of 16,000 people over the two days. On December 31, they performed "Mela!" at the 73rd NHK Kōhaku Uta Gassen, marking their debut appearance on the year-end show.

On January 4, 2023, the band released their first video work titled "Ryokuoushoku Shakai x Nippon Budokan 20122022," featuring a recording of their performance at the venue on September 17. It secured the top position on both Oricon's weekly Music Blu-ray chart and Music DVD/Blu-ray chart. Their fourth studio album, "Pink Blue," was released on May 17, accompanied by the Pink Blue Tour 2023, which commenced on May 20. The tour concluded on July 16, with a total attendance of 42,000 people. On July 22, the band performed overseas for the first time at the 2023 Super Slippa 12 music festival held at the Taipei Nangang Exhibition Center. "Summer Time Cinderella" was released digitally on August 7 and physically on September 6. At the 65th Japan Record Awards, it was nominated for the Grand Prix, ultimately winning the Excellent Work Award. The band kicked off their first arena tour, Ryokushaka Keikaku 2023–2024, on December 15 with a performance at Yokohama Arena.

== Members ==
=== Current members ===
- Haruko Nagaya (長屋 晴子, Nagaya Haruko) – leading vocals, guitar (2011–present)
- Issei Kobayashi (小林 壱誓, Kobayashi Issei) – guitar, backing vocals (2011–present)
- Peppe (ペッぺ) – keyboard, backing vocals (2011–present)
- Shingo Anami (穴見 真吾, Anami Shingo) – bass, backing vocals (2011–present)

=== Former members ===
- Natsumi Amano (天野 夏実, Amano Natsumi) – bass (2011)
- Yasuchika Sugie (杉江 泰周, Sugie Yasuchika) – drums (2011–2015)

== Discography ==
=== Studio albums ===
List of studio albums, including key details, chart rankings, and sales figures:
Title	Details	Peak positions		Sales
Title	Details	JPN	JPN Hot	Sales
Ryokuoushoku Shakai	Released: March 14, 2018; Label: Tower Records; Formats: CD, DL, streaming; Track listing: 1. "Re"; 2. "Hajimari no Uta" (始まりの歌); 3. "Otona Gokko" (大人ごっこ); 4. "Kira Kira" (キラキラ); 5. "Alice"; 6. "Kimi ga Nozomu Sekai" (君が望む世界); 7. "Koitte" (恋って); 8. "Regret"; 9. "Mayonaka Drive" (真夜中ドライブ); 10. "Matane" (またね)	16	20	JPN: 4,264
Singalong	Released: April 22, 2020 (Note: Singalong was scheduled to release both digitally and physically on April 22, 2020, but due to the declaration of a state of emergency because of the COVID-19 pandemic, the physical release was postponed until September 30.); Label: Epic Records Japan; Formats: CD, CD+BD, DL, streaming	7	8	JPN: 11,178
Actor	Released: January 26, 2022; Label: Epic Records Japan; Formats: CD, CD+BD, DL, streaming; Track listing: 1. "Actor"; 2. "Character" (キャラクター); 3. "Merry-go-round"; 4. "Korekara no Koto, Sorekara no Koto" (これからのこと、それからのこと); 5. "Anshin Shitene" (安心してね); 6. "Litmus"; 7. "Zutto Zutto Zutto" (ずっとずっとずっと); 8. "Yureru" (揺れる); 9. "Tatoe Tatoe" (たとえたとえ); 10. "A la Mode ni Waltz" (アラモードにワルツ); 11. "Kesshou" (結証); 12. "S.T.U.D"; 13. "Landscape"; 14. "Screen to Yokogao" (スクリーンと横顔)	4	4	JPN: 15,363
Pink Blue	Released: May 17, 2023; Label: Epic Records Japan; Formats: CD, CD+BD, DL, streaming; Track listing: 1. "Pink Blue" (ピンクブルー); 2. "Starry Drama"; 3. "Jibun Seifuku" (ジブンセイフク); 4. "Aun" (あうん); 5. "Michi wo Yuke" (ミチヲユケ); 6. "Usotsuki" (うそつき); 7. "Hi wa Mata Noboru Kara" (陽はまた昇るから); 8. "Shiketteiru" (湿気っている); 9. "Don!!"; 10. "White Rabbit"; 11. "Samonakuba Dare ga Yaru" (さもなくば誰がやる); 12. "Slow dance"	8	7	JPN: 10,797
Channel U	Released: February 19, 2025; Label: Epic Records Japan; Formats: CD, CD+BD, DL, streaming; Track listing: 1. "Player 1"; 2. "Hazukashiika Seishunwa" (恥ずかしいか青春は); 3. "Nice Idea!" (ナイスアイディア!); 4. "Monkey Dance"; 5. "Intersection" (∩); 6. "Magic Hour" (マジックアワー); 7. "Bokurawa Ikimonodakara" (僕らはいきものだから); 8. "Channel Me"; 9. "Bakano Hitotsuoboe" (馬鹿の一つ覚え); 10. "Each Ring"; 11. "Summer Time Cinderella" (サマータイムシンデレラ); 12. "Ienai" (言えない); 13. "Coffee & Marshmallow" (コーヒーとましゅまろ); 14. "U"; 15. "Party!!"; 16. "Be a flower" (花になって); 17. "Looking for the Northern Lights" (オーロラを探しに)	7	19	JPN: 15,909
Atamago	Released: September 9, 2026; Label: Epic Records Japan; Formats: CD, CD+BD, CD+DVD, DL, streaming; Track listing: 1. "Someone's Country" (誰かの国); 2. "Taboo"; 3. "My Answer"; 4. "Illusion"; 5. "Utamago" (うたまご); 6. "Shirushi" (章); 7. "Wakarinikui" (分かりにくい); 8. "Algorithm" (アルゴリズム); 9. "Resisdance" (レジスダンス); 10. "Riding the Wind" (風に乗る); 11. "Tsuzuku" (つづく); 12. "Hare Bare" (晴々)	10	14	

=== Extended plays ===
List of extended plays, including key details, chart rankings, and sales figures:
Title	Details	Peak positions		Sales
Title	Details	JPN	JPN Hot	Sales
Nice To Meet You??	Released: January 11, 2017; Label: Tower Records; Format: CD, DL, streaming; Track listing: 1. "Matane" (またね); 2. "Outsider" (アウトサイダー); 3. "Regret"; 4. "Bitter"; 5. "Oka to Chiisana Paradigm" (丘と小さなパラダイム)	—	—	
Adore	Released: August 2, 2017; Label: Tower Records; Format: CD, DL, streaming; Track listing: 1. "Hajimari no Uta" (始まりの歌); 2. "Want"; 3. "Kira Kira" (キラキラ); 4. "Koitte" (恋って); 5. "Sorenari no Seikatsu" (それなりの生活)	37	—	
Afureta Mizu no Yukue	Released: November 7, 2018; Label: Epic Records Japan; Format: CD, DL, streaming; Track listing: 1. "Ano Koro Mita Hikari" (あのころ見た光); 2. "Shisen" (視線); 3. "Never Come Back"; 4. "Saboten" (サボテン); 5. "Bitter"; 6. "Little Singer" (リトルシンガー)	17	22	JPN: 3,998
Shiawase	Released: May 29, 2019; Label: Epic Records Japan; Format: CD, CD+BD, DL, streaming; Track listing: 1. "Shiawase" (幸せ); 2. "Gyakuten" (逆転); 3. "Hitorigoto" (ひとりごと); 4. "Nichiyoubi" (にちようび)	13	20	JPN: 3,207

=== Singles ===
List of singles, featuring selected chart positions, release years, certifications, and corresponding album titles:
Title	Year	Peaks		Certifications	Album
Title	Year	JPN	JPN Hot	Certifications	Album
"Little Singer" (リトルシンガー)	2018	—	—		Afureta Mizu no Yukue
"Omoibito" (想い人)	2019	—	—		Singalong
"Sabotage"	2019	32	63		Singalong
"Shout Baby"	2020	21	58	RIAJ: Platinum (st.)	Singalong
"Natsu wo Ikiru" (夏を生きる)	2020	—	— (Note: "Natsu wo Ikiru" did not enter the Billboard Japan Hot 100, but peaked at 70 on the Download Songs.)		Singalong
"Kesshou" (結証)	2021	15	— (Note: "Kesshou" did not enter the Billboard Japan Hot 100, but peaked at 78 on the Download songs.)		Actor
"Tatoe Tatoe" (たとえたとえ)	2021	— (Note: "Tatoe Tatoe" did not enter the Oricon Singles Chart, but peaked at number 28 on the Digital Singles Chart.)	78		Actor
"Zutto Zutto Zutto" (ずっとずっとずっと)	2021	— (Note: "Zutto Zutto Zutto" did not enter the Oricon Singles Chart, but peaked at number 24 on the Digital Singles Chart.)	96		Actor
"Are You Ready" (アーユーレディー)	2021	—	— (Note: "Are You Ready" did not enter the Billboard Japan Hot 100, but peaked at number 94 on the Download Songs.)		Non-album single
"Litmus"	2021	16	44		Actor
"Hi wa Mata Noboru Kara" (陽はまた昇るから)	2022	15	30		Pink Blue
"Breath" (ブレス)	2022	— (Note: "Breath" did not enter the Oricon Singles Chart, but peaked at number 17 on the Digital Singles Chart.)	— (Note: "Breath" did not enter the Billboard Japan Hot 100, but peaked at number 22 on the Download Songs.)		Non-album single
"Michi wo Yuke" (ミチヲユケ)	2022	18	32		Pink Blue
"White Rabbit"	2023	— (Note: "White Rabbit" did not enter the Oricon Singles Chart, but peaked at number 15 on the Digital Singles Chart.)	— (Note: "White Rabbit" did not enter the Billboard Japan Hot 100, but peaked at 18 on the Download Songs.)		Pink Blue
"Summer Time Cinderella" (サマータイムシンデレラ)	2023	17	11	RIAJ: Platinum (st.)	Channel U
"Be a Flower" (花になって)	2023	8	8	RIAJ: Gold (dig.); 2× Platinum (st.)	Channel U
"Party!!"	2024	15	55		Channel U
"Nice Idea!" (ナイスアイディア!)	2024	— (Note: "Nice Idea!" did not enter the Oricon Singles Chart, but peaked at number 10 on the Digital Singles Chart.)	81		Channel U
"Yasai Ondo" (夜祭音頭)	2024	— (Note: "Yasai Ondo (Night Festival Dance Song)" did not enter the Oricon Singles Chart, but peaked at number 28 on the Digital Singles Chart.)	— (Note: "Yasai Ondo (Night Festival Dance Song)" did not enter the Billboard Japan Hot 100, but peaked at number 29 on the Download Songs.)		Non-album single
"Hazukashiika Seishun wa" (恥ずかしいか青春は)	2024	— (Note: "Hazukashiika Seishunwa" did not enter the Oricon Singles Chart, but peaked at number 15 on the Digital Singles Chart.)	— (Note: "Hazukashiika Seishunwa" did not enter the Billboard Japan Hot 100, but peaked at number 15 on the Download Songs.)	RIAJ: Gold (st.)	Channel U
"Ienai" (言えない)	2024	— (Note: "Ienai" did not enter the Oricon Singles Chart, but peaked at number 9 on the Digital Singles Chart.)	— (Note: "Ienai" did not enter the Billboard Japan Hot 100, but peaked at number 9 on the Download Songs.)		Channel U
"Bokura wa Ikimonodakara" (僕らはいきものだから)	2024	— (Note: "Bokurawa Ikimonodakara" did not enter the Oricon Singles Chart, but peaked at number 30 on the Digital Singles Chart.)	— (Note: "Bokurawa Ikimonodakara" did not enter the Billboard Japan Hot 100, but peaked at number 35 on the Download Songs.)		Channel U
"Baka no Hitotsu Oboe" (馬鹿の一つ覚え)	2024	— (Note: "Bakano Hitotsuoboe" did not enter the Oricon Singles Chart, but peaked at number 14 on the Digital Singles Chart.)	— (Note: "Bakano Hitotsuoboe" did not enter the Billboard Japan Hot 100, but peaked at number 13 on the Download Songs.)		Channel U
"Illusion"	2025	— (Note: "Illusion" did not enter the Oricon Singles Chart, but peaked at number 12 on the Digital Singles Chart.)	68		Atamago
"Tsuzuku" (つづく)	2025	— (Note: "Tsuzuku" did not enter the Oricon Singles Chart, but peaked at number 17 on the Digital Singles Chart.)	— (Note: "Tsuzuku" did not enter the Billboard Japan Hot 100, but peaked at number 15 on the Download Songs.)		Atamago
"My Answer"	2025	14	— (Note: "My Answer" did not enter the Billboard Japan Hot 100, but peaked at 15 on the Download songs.)		Atamago
"Riding the Wind" (風に乗る)	2026	24	89		Atamago
"Shirushi" (章)	2026	— (Note: "Shirushi" did not enter the Oricon Singles Chart, but peaked at number six on the Digital Singles Chart.)	— (Note: "Shirushi" did not enter the Billboard Japan Hot 100, but peaked at six on the Download Songs.)		Atamago
"Hare Bare" (晴々)	2026	— (Note: "Hare Bare" did not enter the Oricon Singles Chart, but peaked at number ten on the Digital Singles Chart.)	60		Atamago

=== Other charted songs ===
List of other charted songs, featuring selected chart positions, release years, certifications, and corresponding album titles:
Title	Year	Peaks		Certifications	Album
Title	Year	JPN Comb.	JPN Hot	Certifications	Album
"Mela!"	2020	31	37	RIAJ: Platinum (dig.); 3× Platinum (st.)	Singalong
"Korekara no Koto, Sorekara no Koto" (これからのこと、それからのこと)	2021	—	— (Note: "Korekara no Koto, Sorekara no Koto" did not enter the Billboard Japan Hot 100, but peaked at number 97 on the Download Songs.)		Actor
"Landscape"	2022	— (Note: "Landscape" did not enter the Oricon Combined Singles Chart, but peaked at number 26 on the Digital Singles Chart.)	58		Actor
"Character" (キャラクター)	2022	— (Note: "Character" did not enter the Oricon Combined Singles Chart, but peaked at number 7 on the Digital Singles Chart.)	27	RIAJ: Platinum (st.)	Actor
"Don!!"	2022	— (Note: "Don!!" did not enter the Oricon Combined Singles Chart, but peaked at number 39 on the Digital Singles Chart.)	— (Note: "Don!!" did not enter the Billboard Japan Hot 100, but peaked at number 40 on the Download Songs.)		Pink Blue
"Usotsuki" (うそつき)	2023	— (Note: "Usotsuki" did not enter the Oricon Combined Singles Chart, but peaked at number 38 on the Digital Singles Chart.)	— (Note: "Usotsuki" did not enter the Billboard Japan Hot 100, but peaked at number 41 on the Download Songs.)		Pink Blue
"Magic Hour" (マジックアワー)	2023	— (Note: "Magic Hour" did not enter the Oricon Combined Singles Chart, but peaked at number 10 on the Digital Singles Chart.)	80		Channel U
"Yume to Akuma to Fantasy" (夢と悪魔とファンタジー)	2023	—	— (Note: "Yume to Akuma to Fantasy" did not enter the Billboard Japan Hot 100, but peaked at number 57 on the Download Songs.)		B-side on "Be a Flower"
"Tap Tap Dance"	2024	— (Note: "Tap Tap Dance" did not enter the Oricon Combined Singles Chart, but peaked at number 42 on the Digital Singles Chart.)	— (Note: "Tap Tap Dance" did not enter the Billboard Japan Hot 100, but peaked at number 44 on the Download Songs.)		B-side on "Party!!"
"Player 1"	2025	— (Note: "Player 1" did not enter the Oricon Combined Singles Chart, but peaked at number 21 on the Digital Singles Chart.)	85		Channel U

== Awards and nominations ==
Year	Ceremony	Award	Nominated work	Result	References
2021	MTV Video Music Awards Japan	Best Rock Video	Litmus	Won	
2023	65th Japan Record Awards	Excellent Work Award	Summer Time Cinderella	Won	
