= Singalong (album) =

2020 studio album by Ryokuoushoku Shakai

Studio album by Ryokuoushoku Shakai
- Released: April 22, 2020
- Genre: J-pop; rock; electro; ambient
- Length: 53:55
- Language: Japanese
- Label: Epic Records Japan

Ryokuoushoku Shakai chronology
Shiawase (2019)	Singalong (2020)	Actor (2022)

Singles from Singalong
- 1. "Omoibito" Released: August 30, 2019; 2. "Sabotage" Released: November 6, 2019; 3. "Shout Baby" Released: February 19, 2020; 4. "Natsu wo Ikiru" Released: July 31, 2020

Singalong is the second studio album by Japanese pop rock band Ryokuoushoku Shakai. Released digitally on April 22, 2020, and physically on September 30, it was the band's first studio album since their major label debut.

== Background and release ==
On March 7, 2020, the band announced that their first studio album since their major label debut would be released on April 22. Originally, there was no concept or vision, and after including previous singles, songs were selected while looking at the balance. After looking at the track listing, they decided that "the songs are the core" and named the album Singalong.

On April 13, 2020, advance distribution of "Mela!" started, and it was used in a commercial starring Tina Tamashiro. They also announced that the physical release of the album would be postponed due to the declaration of a state of emergency on April 7 with the COVID-19 pandemic. The album was digitally released as scheduled in April. It was later announced in July during their live stream concert that the physical release would be on September 30.

On July 24, a live stream concert Singalong Tour 2020: Natsu wo Ikiru was held, where they performed their single "Natsu wo Ikiru".

== Music and lyrics ==
The album has J-pop, rock, electro, and ambient music.

"Singalong" serves as the overture to the album. After recording for the album was completed, thinking of the title of the album, it was created at the end because the band "wanted something like an overture". The four members discussed the direction of the song and Kobayashi created an image and they began expanding the song, but the song ended up different from the original image. From there, the chords were created with Peppe on the keyboard, Kobayashi on the acoustic guitar, and Anami on the electric guitar. Anami also said that he "layered around six vocals that sounded like Freddie imitations" which ultimately were not chosen.

"Sabotage" was titled after Nagaya saw Dempagumi.inc's cover of Beastie Boys' "Sabotage", learned that the word was the origin of "to slack off" (サボる, saboru), and thought that it matched the main character Yaeko of You and I on the G string, where the song was used as the theme song. The title has the meaning of "destroying yourself who is lost" and "destroying yourself who has nothing". The theme of the song is self, and Nagaya, the composer, wanted to depict "what to do from emptiness". The demo for the song was created from February to March 2019 while recording the band's EP Shiawase. The initial arrangement featured more guitar, and around eight introduction patterns were created; later, strings were included, and the melody of the chorus was added to the introduction.

"Mela!", the album's title track, was originally thought of by Peppe. Although she thought of the phrase, she was unable to expand the image of the song, so she had a jam session with Anami and they completed the melody. The melody Peppe initially created as the A-melody was used in the chorus. After Nagaya listened to the song, she and Kobayashi wrote the lyrics together based on his plot. The analog synthesizer Prophet-6 is used, and "Mela!" is also the band's first song to include a brass arrangement.

The lyrics of "Omoibito" were written by Nagaya and the music was composed by Kobayashi. It served as the theme song for the film Hatsukoi Loss Time (2019). The song is about the "feelings of compassion for people". Nagaya intentionally used her modal voice instead of falsetto for the high-pitched parts to "better express the strength and feelings [she] put in the song". "Inori" is an electro-style song written and composed by Kobayashi. The lyrics were inspired by his thoughts and admonishments toward himself for his inability to do anything regarding an incident in his private life. The song was arranged by Tomi Yo, and electro elements and strings were added to a demo produced by Kobayashi. "Shout Baby" was used as the ending theme for the fourth season of My Hero Academia. "Scarlet" was initially written while creating a theme song for the drama You and Me on the G String, and the lyrics were rewritten by Anami. He stated that he expanded on fragments of the original lyrics. The Rhodes piano is used in the song, and Nagaya said that she likes "the feel of Rhodes' glissando in this fast-tempo song". "Ippo" is a middle ballad written and composed by Nagaya. The arrangement was initially "more heartrending and gentle" but was changed with the help of Tomi Yo because it did not match the lyrics. "Ai no Katachi" includes the sound of entering a coffee booth with the staff, an inflated balloon bursting, and the chatter recorded in the booth. "Shiawase" was initially released as the title track of the band's extended play of the same name and is their first ballad. "Brand New World" imagines "performing at a place like an outdoor festival". "Ano Koro Mita Hikari" was first included in the band's extended play Afureta Mizu no Yukue as its lead track, and was composed by Peppe two years before its release. "Fuyu no Asa" was composed by Nagaya when she was in college and reflects how part of her was unhappy about receiving compliments from her friends about her music career because from her point of view, everyone was amazing too. The concept for "Natsu wo Ikiru" had existed since the summer of 2019, but was completed in 2020 during the COVID-19 pandemic. The song has the theme of baseball with the idea that "summer is baseball".

== Reception ==
In a review for Skream!, Saori Yoshiba wrote that the album is "overflowing with love for music", and that the combination of Haruko Nagaya's emotional vocals and the energy of the rest of the members "make them shine to the fullest". Atsutake Kaneko, writing for Mikiki, said that the album focuses on Nagaya's "free-spirited" singing and "raised the level of perfection in J-pop".

== Track listing ==
CD
No.	Title	Lyrics	Music	Arrangement	Length
1.	"Singalong"	Ryokuoushoku Shakai	Ryokuoushoku Shakai	Ryokuoushoku Shakai; LASTorder	1:20
2.	"Sabotage"	Haruko Nagaya	Nagaya	Naoki Itai; Ryokuoushoku Shakai	3:58
3.	"Mela!"	Nagaya; Issei Kobayashi	Peppe; Shingo Anami	Hiroaki Yokoyama; Ryokuoushoku Shakai	4:02
4.	"Omoibito" (想い人)	Nagaya	Kobayashi	Itai; Ryokuoushoku Shakai	4:32
5.	"Inori"	Kobayashi	Kobayashi	Tomi Yo; Ryokuoushoku Shakai	4:12
6.	"Shout Baby"	Nagaya	Nagaya	Itai; Ryokuoushoku Shakai	4:23
7.	"Scarlet" (スカーレット)	Anami	Anami	Keita Kawaguchi; Ryokuoushoku Shakai	3:34
8.	"Ippo" (一歩)	Nagaya	Nagaya	Tomi Yo	4:29
9.	"Ai no Katachi" (愛のかたち)	Nagaya	Nagaya	Ryokuoushoku Shakai; LASTorder	4:29
10.	"Shiawase" (幸せ)	Nagaya	Nagaya	Soundbreakers; Ryokuoushoku Shakai	5:10
11.	"Brand New World"	Kobayashi	Kobayashi	Soundbreakers; Ryokuoushoku Shakai	3:46
12.	"Ano Koro Mita Hikari" (あのころ見た光)	Kobayashi; Nagaya	Peppe	Itai; Ryokuoushoku Shakai	4:00
13.	"Fuyu no Asa" (冬の朝)	Nagaya	Nagaya	Soundbreakers; Ryokuoushoku Shakai	5:05
Total length:					53:55

CD (Natsu wo Ikiru version)
No.	Title	Lyrics	Music	Arrangement	Length
1.	"Natsu wo Ikiru" (夏を生きる)	Haruko Nagaya	Nagaya	Naoki Itai; Ryokuoushoku Shakai	4:26
2.	"Mela!" (Natsu wo Ikkita Remix)	Nagaya; Issei Kobayashi	Peppe; Shingo Anami	LASTorder (Remixer)	4:40
3.	"Sabotage" (from Singalong Tour 2020: Natsu wo Ikiru 2020.7.24)	Nagaya	Nagaya		4:06
4.	"Shout Baby" (from Singalong Tour 2020: Natsu wo Ikiru 2020.7.24)	Nagaya	Nagaya		4:54
5.	"802 Bintang Garden 'Social Experiment of Ryokuoushoku Shakai'"				42:58
6.	"Natsu ni Bateru" (夏にバテる; Secret Track)	Kobayashi	Kobayashi		7:22
Total length:					68:26

== Personnel ==
Adapted from the booklets in Singalong

- Haruko Nagaya – lead vocals, guitar
- Issei Kobayashi – guitar, backing vocals
- Peppe – keyboard, backing vocals, tambourine
- Shingo Anami – bass, backing vocals

=== CD ===
==== Production ====
- LASTorder – programming (tracks 1, 9)
- Shingo Anami – programming (tracks 1, 9)
- Naoki Itai – programming (tracks 2, 4, 6, 12)
- Nao Nishimura – additional arrangement (track 2, 6, 12)
- Hiroaki Yokoyama – programming (track 3)
- Tomi Yo – programming (tracks 5, 8)
- Issei Kobayashi – programming (track 5)
- Keita Kawaguchi – programming (track 7)
- Soundbreakers – programming (track 10–11, 13)

==== Instruments ====
- Haruko Nagaya – backing vocals (track 3), tambourine (track 3), clap (track 3), balloon popping (track 9)
- Issei Kobayashi – tambourine (track 3), claps (track 3), environmental sound recording (track 9)
- Peppe – tambourine (track 3), claps (track 3)
- Shingo Anami – tambourine (track 3), claps (track 3), environmental sound recording (track 9), balloon popping (track 9)
- Osamu Hidai – drums (tracks 2, 4, 6–7, 10, 13)
- Yasuko Murata – strings (tracks 2, 10, 13)
- Mizuki Mori – drums (track 3), backing vocals (track 3), tambourine (track 3), claps (track 3)
- Junki Yomoto – trumpet (track 3)
- Miho Terachi – alto saxophone (track 3)
- Toshihiro Kawashima – trombone (track 3)
- Machi Okabe – strings (track 4)
- Utena Yoshida – strings (track 5)
- Hiroshi Kido – drums (track 11–12)

=== Natsu wo Ikiru version ===
==== Production ====
- Naoki Itai – programming (track 1)
- LASTorder – remixing (track 2), programming (track2), background music and jingle additional arrangement (track 3)

==== Instruments ====
- Mizuki Mori – drums (track 1)
- Kei Setsune – violin (track 1)
- Junko Uchida – narration (track 3)

== Charts ==
=== Weekly charts ===
Weekly chart performance for Singalong
Chart (2020)	Peak position
Japanese Albums (Oricon)	7
Japanese Combined Albums (Oricon)	7
Japanese Hot Albums (Billboard Japan)	8

=== Year-end charts ===
Year-end chart performance for Singalong
Chart (2020)	Position
Japan Hot Albums (Billboard Japan)	99
