= 2021 MTV Video Music Awards Japan =

Annual Japanese music awards ceremony

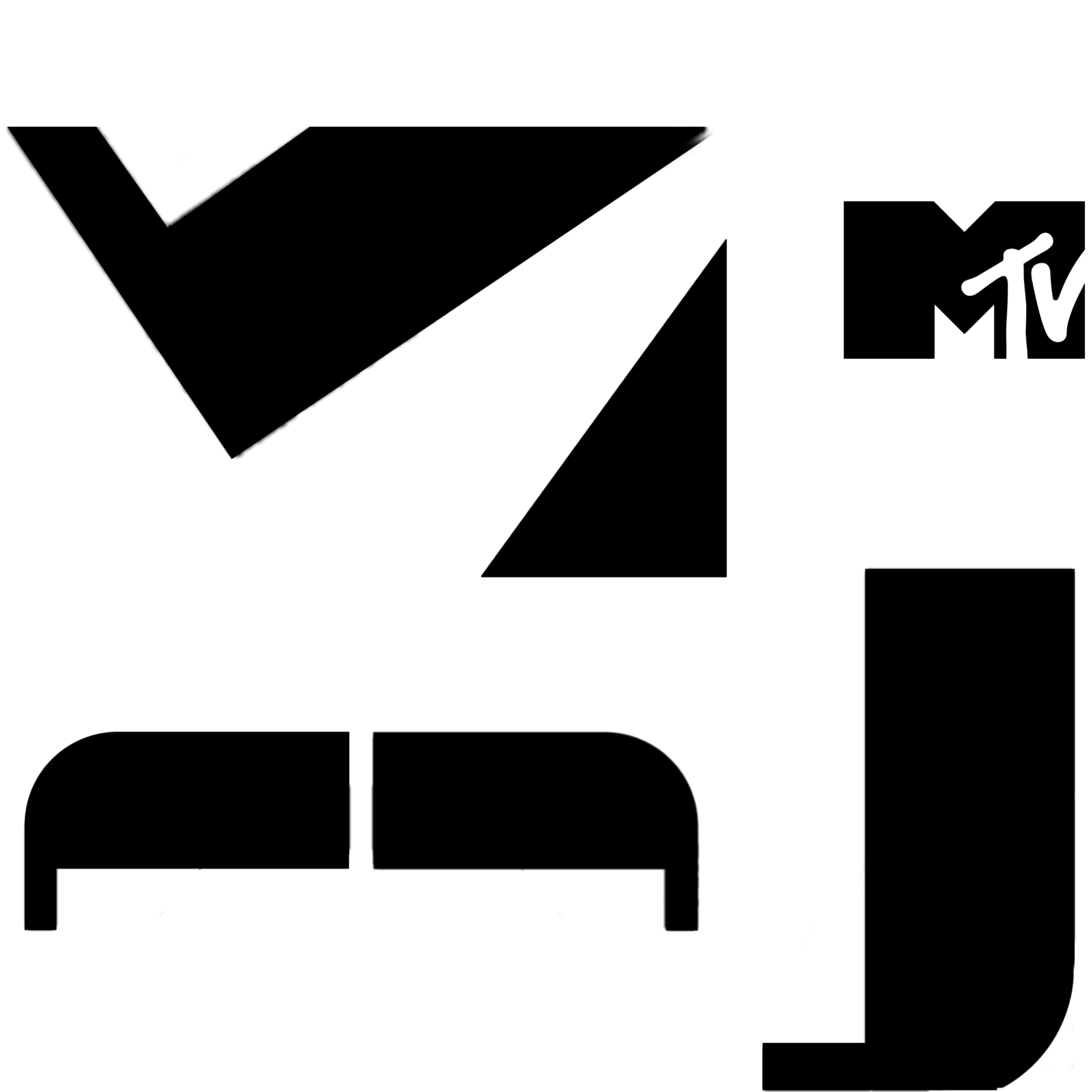
- Date: December 18, 2021
- Hosted by: Akari Kitō and Ken Ayugai

Television/radio coverage
- Network: MTV Japan

The 2021 MTV Video Music Awards Japan were held on December 18, 2021.

== Main awards ==
=== Best video of the year ===
Official Hige Dandism - "Cry Baby"

=== Best solo artist video ===
Japan

Gen Hoshino - "Fushigi"

International

Billie Eilish - "Happier Than Ever"

=== Best group video ===
Japan

Official Hige Dandism - "Cry Baby"

International

BTS - "Butter"

=== Best new artist video ===
Japan

Sakurazaka46 - "Nagaredama"

International

Olivia Rodrigo - "Drivers License"

=== Best collaboration video ===
Japan

Millennium Parade - "U"

International

Coldplay, BTS - "My Universe"

=== Best rock video ===
Ryokuoushoku Shakai - "Litmus"

=== Best alternative video ===
Zutomayo - "Kuraku Kuroku"

=== Best pop video ===
Milet - "Ordinary Days"

=== Best hip hop video ===
Sky-Hi - "To The First"

=== Best Latin video ===
The Rampage - Heatwave

=== Best dance video ===
JO1 - "Real"

=== Best art direction video ===
Hinatazaka46 - "Tteka"

=== Best visual effects ===
Vaundy - "Shiwaawase"

=== Best shooting ===
Aina the End - "Kinmokusei"

=== Best choreography ===
Daichi Miura - "Backwards"

== Special awards ==
=== Best artist ===
Yoasobi

=== Best song ===
Yuuri – "Dry Flower"

=== Best album ===
Official Hige Dandism - Editorial

=== MTV Pop The World award ===
Nogizaka46

=== Best buzz award ===
NiziU

=== Rising Star award ===
Be First

=== MTV breakthrough Song ===
Ado – "Usseewa"
