= Mela! =

2020 song by Ryokuoushoku Shakai

Promotional single by Ryokuoushoku Shakai

from the album Singalong
- Language: Japanese
- Released: April 13, 2020
- Genre: Dance-rock; pop-soul
- Length: 4:02
- Label: Epic Records Japan
- Composers: Peppe; Shingo Anami
- Lyricists: Haruko Nagaya; Issei Kobayashi

Music video
- "Mela!" on YouTube

"Mela!" is a song by Japanese pop rock band Ryokuoushoku Shakai. It was released as a promotional single on April 13, 2020, by Epic Records Japan, ahead of the band's studio album Singalong. Commercially, the song peaked at number 31 on the Oricon Combined Singles Chart and number 37 on the Billboard Japan Hot 100. It was certified Platinum for digital sales and Double Platinum for streams by the RIAJ in January 2023. Ryokuoushoku Shakai made their debut at the year-end Kōhaku Uta Gassen with "Mela!" on the 2022 edition of the television special.

== Background and release ==
Ryokuoushoku Shakai's keyboardist Peppe originally thought of the phrase "mela", but she was unable to expand the image of the song, so she had a jam session with bassist Shingo Anami and they completed the melody. The melody Peppe initially created as the A-melody was used in the chorus. After Nagaya listened to the song, she and Kobayashi wrote the lyrics together based on the plot he wrote, finishing the song. The analog synthesizer Prophet-6 is used, and "Mela!" is also the band's first song to include a brass arrangement.

"Mela!" was released on April 13, 2020, ahead of Singalong. It was then used in a commercial for Dariya's "Palty Coloring Milk" starring Tina Tamashiro. The song was also used in the Nippon TV show Sukkiri for "Hitotsu ni Narou! Dance One Project".

In 2022, the band made their debut performance in the year-end special 73rd NHK Kōhaku Uta Gassen, performing "Mela!" third as part of the red team.

== Music videos ==
The music video for "Mela!" was released on the band's YouTube channel on April 13, 2020. It features a wolf, considered a villain, who changes its destiny. Eight creators participated in the animation of the music video: Sutore, Okawari, Wataboku, Otomoai, Tatsuhiro Ariyoshi, Sayuri, Jose Shimazaki, and Pantovisco. A second music video, combining footage of the members performing at home and making-of footage from the recording process, was released on April 29, 2020.

== Charts ==
=== Weekly charts ===
Weekly chart performance for "Mela!"
Chart (2020–2022)	Peak position
Japan (Japan Hot 100)	37
Japan Combined Singles (Oricon)	31

=== Year-end charts ===
Year-end chart performance for "Mela!"
Chart (2020)	Position
Japan Download Songs (Billboard Japan)	97
Chart (2021)	Position
Japan (Japan Hot 100)	57
Chart (2022)	Position
Japan (Japan Hot 100)	43
Chart (2023)	Position
Japan (Japan Hot 100)	58

== Certifications ==
Certifications for "Mela!"
Region	Certification	Certified units/sales
Japan (RIAJ) Digital	Platinum	250,000^{*}
Streaming
Japan (RIAJ)	3× Platinum	300,000,000^{†}
^{*} Sales figures based on certification alone.^{†} Streaming-only figures based on certification alone.
