= Summer Time Cinderella =

2023 single by Ryokuoushoku Shakai

Single by Ryokuoushoku Shakai

from the album Channel U
- Language: Japanese
- B-side: "Magic Hour"
- Released: August 7, 2023
- Length: 3:48
- Label: Epic Japan
- Composer: Shingo Anami
- Lyricists: Haruko Nagaya; Issei Kobayashi

Ryokuoushoku Shakai singles chronology
"White Rabbit" (2023)	"Summer Time Cinderella" (2023)	"Be a Flower" (2023)

Music video
- "Summer Time Cinderella" on YouTube

"Summer Time Cinderella" (サマータイムシンデレラ, Samā Taimu Shinderera) is a song by Japanese pop rock band Ryokuoushoku Shakai. It was released on August 7, 2023, under Epic Records Japan, as the theme song for the Fuji TV television drama Cinderella of Midsummer.

== Background and release ==
The production of "Summer Time Cinderella" began with the composition. After receiving the offer for the theme song of Cinderella of Midsummer, all of the members wrote several songs, with some members visiting Enoshima, where the drama is set. Ultimately Shingo Anami's song was selected, with Issei Kobayashi later adding lyrics. Once they met with the drama's producer, Haruko Nagaya contributed to the lyrics while they were being revised. The lyrics of "Summer Time Cinderella" were written based on the script of the drama, and rewritten to remove specific elements of Cinderella so it could be used in various scenes. The arrangement, originally by Anami, was also changed with the help of LASTorder after the drama team pointed out that the song sounded old fashioned.

On July 7, 2023, it was announced that "Summer Time Cinderella" would be the theme song for the Fuji TV television drama Cinderella of Midsummer, set to begin broadcasting three days later. The band repeatedly discussed with the drama team and created and submitted several songs in the process of finding the theme song, and "Summer Time Cinderella" was selected.

Advance distribution of the song began on July 24, with the jacket art as a photo of clothes thrown on the beach. On the same day, it was announced that "Summer Time Cinderella" would be released as a single on August 7 with "Magic Hour" from the soundtrack Cinderella of Midsummer as the B-side, with the CD release on September 6. "Magic Hour" was written by Kobayashi and arranged by the band members and LASTorder. The first press limited edition of the CD included live footage from Ryokuoushoku Shakai's performance on June 15 at the Tokyo International Forum during their national hall tour Pink Blue Tour 2023.

== Music video ==
The music video for "Summer Time Cinderella" was released on August 7, 2023. It was directed by Takuro Okubo. The video featured the band performing on the beach as well as fireworks.

== Accolades ==
Name of the award ceremony, year presented, award category, and the result of the nomination
Year	Award ceremony	Category	Result	Ref.
2023	Japan Record Awards	Grand Prix	Nominated	
2023	Japan Record Awards	Excellent Work Award (Songs of the Year)	Won	

== Track listing ==
"Summer Time Cinderella" track listing
No.	Title	Lyrics	Music	Arrangement	Length
1.	"Summer Time Cinderella" (サマータイムシンデレラ)	Haruko Nagaya; Issei Kobayashi	Shingo Anami	LASTorder; Anami	3:48
2.	"Magic Hour" (マジックアワー)	Kobayashi	Kobayashi	LASTorder; Ryokuoushoku Shakai	3:43
3.	"Summer Time Cinderella" (Instrumental)				3:48
4.	"Magic Hour" (Instrumental)				3:42
Total length:					15:01

== Personnel ==
Adapted from the booklet in "Summer Time Cinderella"

Production

- LASTorder – programming

Instruments

- Haruko Nagaya – vocals, guitar
- Issei Kobayashi – guitar
- Peppe – keyboard
- Shingo Anami – bass
- Osamu Hidai – drums
- Atsuki Yumoto – trumpet

== Charts ==
=== Weekly charts ===
Weekly chart performance for "Summer Time Cinderella"
Chart (2023)	Peak position
Japan (Japan Hot 100)	11
Japan (Oricon)	17
Japan Combined Singles (Oricon)	9

=== Monthly charts ===
Monthly chart performance for "Summer Time Cinderella"
Chart (2023)	Position
Japan (Oricon)	45

=== Year-end charts ===
Year-end chart performance for "Summer Time Cinderella"
Chart (2023)	Position
Japan Download Songs (Billboard Japan)	52

== Certifications ==
Certifications for "Summer Time Cinderella"
Region	Certification	Certified units/sales
Streaming
Japan (RIAJ)	Platinum	100,000,000^{†}
^{†} Streaming-only figures based on certification alone.
