= Yumi Uchimura =

- 内村 友美
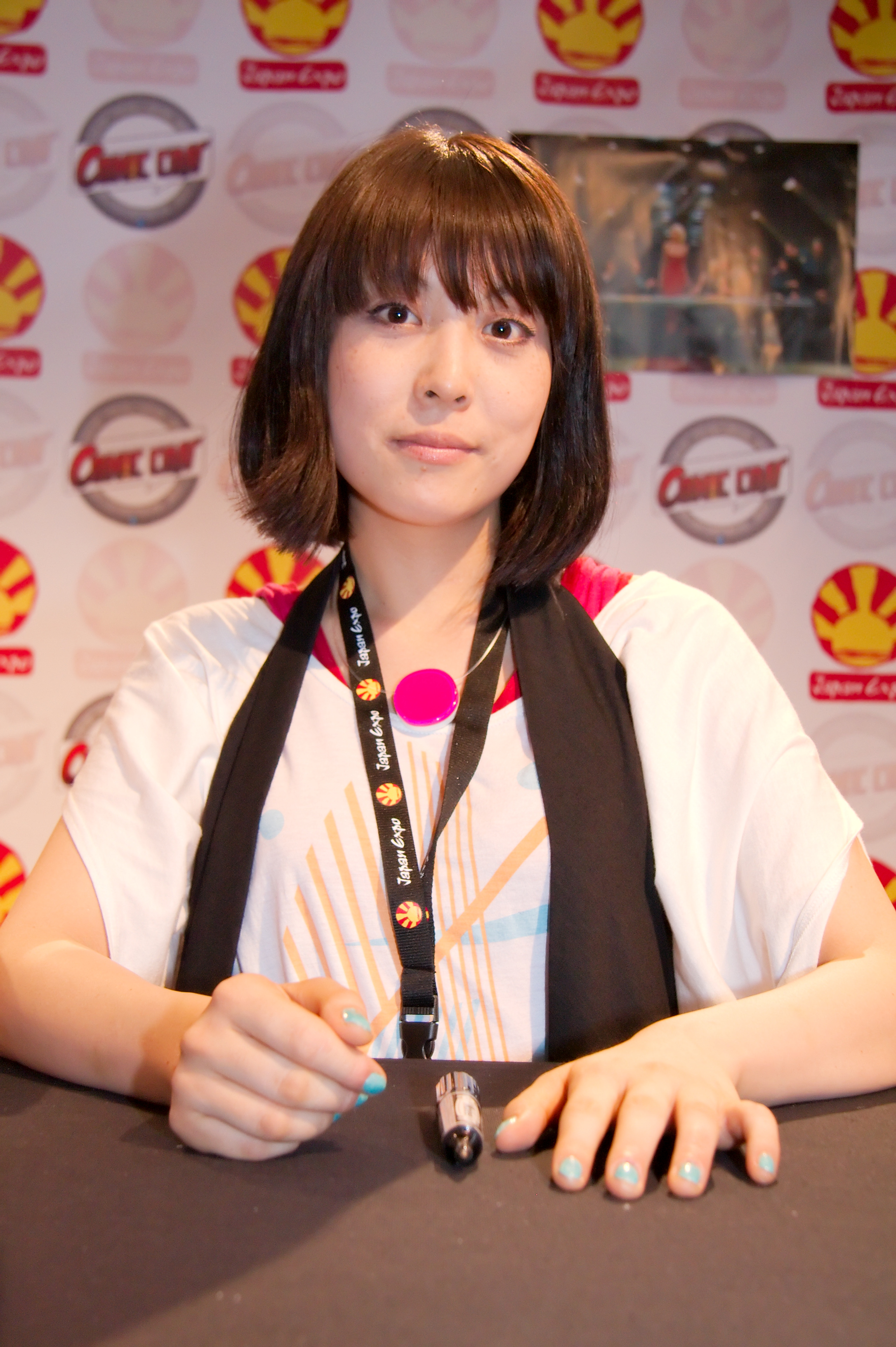
- Uchimura in 2009
- Born: September 6, 1983 (age 42); Chiba Prefecture, Japan
- Citizenship: Japan
- Occupations: Musician; songwriter
- Years active: 2004–present
- Spouse: Undisclosed (m. 2019)
- Children: 1
- Musical career
- Instruments: Vocals; guitar
- Member of: La La Larks
- Formerly of: School Food Punishment

Yumi Uchimura (内村 友美, Uchimura Yumi; born September 6, 1983) is a Japanese singer-songwriter and musician, best known as the former lead vocalist of School Food Punishment and the current frontwoman of La La Larks.

== Biography ==
Uchimura's passion for music began at an early age, with singing being an integral part of her life from childhood. She described singing as a natural, almost instinctive activity, akin to a family trade. Influenced by her older sister, she listened to artists like Scha Dara Parr in her early years, later gravitating toward J-pop singer-songwriters such as Ringo Sheena, Cocco, and Chihiro Onitsuka during her high school years. Despite her love for music, her parents initially opposed her pursuing it professionally. However, Uchimura still enrolled in a music business program at a vocational school, later switching to the vocal department, where she began to hone her craft. During this time, she started performing as a solo acoustic artist, incorporating rhythmic elements in her music despite not being well-versed in percussion.

Influenced by the sound of Spangle call Lilli line, Uchimura eventually transitioned from solo acoustic performances to forming a band to fully realize her musical vision. In 2004, she co-founded School Food Punishment, a band that became known for its unique blend of post-rock, electronica, and pop. School Food Punishment was signed to major label Epic Records Japan in 2009, and during this time she met Ryo Eguchi, who later became a key collaborator in her subsequent projects. The band released several albums and singles before going on hiatus in 2012. She cited the demands of the professional music environment and the challenges of maintaining a band to her decision to take a break from band activities after the hiatus.

In 2012, Uchimura co-founded the band La La Larks alongside Eguchi, Ryoro Mitsui, Keisuke Kubota, and Turkey. Initially conceived as a fluid, collaborative project, La La Larks evolved into a fixed-member band after their first live performance in May 2012. Uchimura cited the joy of performing with the group as a key factor in her decision to pursue La La Larks as a full-fledged band, rekindling her passion for music after feeling exhausted from her previous experiences.

In 2019, Uchimura announced La La Larks' temporary hiatus from live activities. Citing health concerns, including issues discovered during tonsil surgery that required significant treatment, she announced she had decided to take time to focus on her well-being while continuing creative work during the break. The band held their last concert on September 6, 2019.

In 2020, Uchimura performed a duet with Maaya Sakamoto for her concept album Duets, created to celebrate Sakamoto's twenty-fifth debut anniversary. In 2021, she was invited as a guest performer to Sakamoto's twenty-fifth anniversary concert held at Yokohama Arena. Additionally, she wrote the lyrics for the B-side track "Sekai no Himitsu" on Sakamoto's single "Nina," released in November 2024.

== Personal life ==
In June 2019, Uchimura announced her marriage through her official website. In February 2022, she announced the birth of her first daughter.

== Songwriting credits ==
Year	Title	Artist	Album / EP	Credits	Label
2021	"Sync"	Maaya Sakamoto	Duets	Lyrics	FlyingDog
2022	"Who Knows the Answer"	CyAnos	Do You Know Me?	Lyrics	CyAnos Records
2022	"Still It Was So Beautiful"	CyAnos	Do You Know Me?	Lyrics	CyAnos Records
2024	"Sekai no Himitsu"	Maaya Sakamoto	Nina	Lyrics	FlyingDog
2025	"Kawaki"	Yoshino	Shōshi Senban	Lyrics	Pony Canyon
