= La La Larks =

Japanese rock band

- Origin: Japan
- Genres: Pop rock; anime song
- Years active: 2012–present
- Label: FlyingDog
- Members: Yumi Uchimura; Ryo Eguchi; Ritsuo Mitsui; Keisuke Kubota; Takayuki "Turkey" Hosokawa

La La Larks (stylized in lower case) is a Japanese rock band formed in 2012. The five-member group consists of Yumi Uchimura (vocals), Ryo Eguchi (keyboards), Ritsuo Mitsui (guitar), Keisuke Kubota (bass), and Takayuki "Turkey" Hosokawa (drums). Known for their dynamic live performances and contributions to anime soundtracks, the band emerged after the disbandment of School Food Punishment, bringing together musicians from various notable Japanese acts.

== Biography ==
La La Larks was formed in 2012 following the hiatus of School Food Punishment, a band in which both Yumi Uchimura and Ryo Eguchi were key members, Uchimura as their frontwoman, and Eguchi as their producer and support member, mainly handling keyboards, piano, and arrangement/programming during live shows and recordings. The initial idea of a band began informally during a drinking session at Eguchi’s studio, where discussions about Uchimura’s solo performances led to the idea of assembling a group of musicians. Initially, the band was intended to support Uchimura’s solo project, but it evolved into a full-fledged project. Eguchi recruited Mitsui of The Youth and Lost In Time, a guitarist he considered essential, due to their prior collaboration in School Food Punishment. Turkey, a former drummer for Go!Go!7188, joined after his band disbanded, and he invited Kubota of Sads to complete the lineup. The band’s formation was driven by a shared desire to create music with close-knit collaborators, with Eguchi likening the band’s dynamic to a marriage built on mutual respect and creative synergy. The band’s name was chosen before a clear concept was defined, and the initial lineup was described as a "fluid" project, with the possibility of rotating vocalists. However, after their first live show, Uchimura found the experience invigorating and committed to the band, leading to its formal establishment.

In the two years following their formation, La La Larks focused on grassroots efforts, prioritizing live performances and building a fanbase. They performed on a regular basis, appeared on local radio programs, and engaged in crowdfunding to produce records. Rather than rushing to release music, the band took a deliberate approach, creating demo tracks for pre-production and distributing them as bonuses with live show tickets. These demos gained traction when a radio director, familiar with Uchimura from her previous work, played them on J-Wave, boosting the band’s visibility. During this period, La La Larks also collaborated with other artists, providing a remix for Hitomi Azuma’s album and a song for Chiaki Kuriyama. These opportunities, secured through personal connections, allowed the band to expand their reach while maintaining a focus on authentic, process-driven activities.

The band gained attention in 2014 through a crowdfunding campaign in collaboration with J-Wave’s radio program Tokyo Real-Eyes, for a crowdfunding project, surpassing their funding goal in merely forty days. In June of that year, they released their major debut single “Ego-izm,” which served as the ending theme for the anime M3: The Dark Metal. The collaboration came about through a connection with a director who had previously worked with Eguchi on Maaya Sakamoto's single "Be Mine!," which he co-arranged with The Band Apart. A year later, they released their second single, "Hallelujah," for the anime Sky Wizards Academy. Both releases were produced in partnership with FlyingDog, which provided the high-quality production environment the band sought. In 2015, they also collaborated with Maaya Sakamoto for her song "Shikisai," which was commissioned as theme song for the smartphone game Fate/Grand Order. Uchimura and Eguchi had previously worked with Sakamoto on her single "Buddy," but this became their first time doing so as La La Larks. The band also recorded their own version of "Shikisai," which was included as a B-side on their single "Hallelujah." Additionally, they released the track "Tokyo Light," a collaboration with musician Akihisa Kondo, on digital platforms on August 5, 2015.

In 2017, marking their fifth anniversary, the band released their debut full-length album, Culture Vulture. The album was proposed by their FlyingDog director as a celebratory milestone, aligning with the band's growing live audience and fan requests for a comprehensive release.

In 2018, the band contributed to the anime Lord of Vermilion: The Crimson King by providing the ending theme song "Kureku, Zetsubō no Hana," performed by Junna, with La La Larks handling the lyrics, composition, and arrangement. The song was released as Junna's second single on July 18 of that year. Additionally, they collaborated with Maaya Sakamoto on her single "Gyakkō," released on July 25. While Ryo Eguchi co-arranged the title track, which was used as theme song for the second phase of the smartphone game Fate/Grand Order, the single also included the song "Kūhaku," composed and arranged by La La Larks, which was used as theme song for the Fate/Grand Order arcade game. In September, the band released their own digital single "After," composed by guitarist Mitsui with lyrics written by Uchimura, serving as the theme song for their December Lark It Up! 2018 Tour across Tokyo, Nagoya, and Osaka. This track highlighted a new facet of the band’s evolving sound, reflecting their collaborative spirit and dedication to live performances.

In 2019, Uchimura announced La La Larks would enter a temporary hiatus from live activities, citing health concerns upon undergoing tonsil surgery. The band held their last concert at the Tsutaya O-West on September 6, 2019.

== Discography ==
=== Albums ===
Title	Details
Culture Vulture	Released: August 30, 2017; Label: FlyingDog; Formats: CD, CD+DVD

=== Singles ===
Year	Title	Peak chart positions	Album
Year	Title	JPN	Album
2014	"Ego-izm"	53	Culture Vulture
2015	"Hallelujah"	57	Culture Vulture
2015	"Tokyo Light" (with Akihisa Kondo)	—	Non-album single
2018	"After"	—	Non-album single
"—" denotes a recording that did not chart or was not released in that territory.

== Songwriting credits ==
Year	Title	Artist	Album / EP	Credits	Label
2013	"0"	Chiaki Kuriyama	Non-album single	Lyrics; Music; Arrangement	Defstar Records
2015	"Shikisai"	Maaya Sakamoto	Follow Me Up	Music; Arrangement	FlyingDog
2018	"Kūhaku"	Maaya Sakamoto	Single Collection+ Achikochi	Music; Arrangement	FlyingDog
2018	"Akaku, Zetsubō no Hana"	Junna	Jūnana-sai ga Utsukushii Nante, Dare ga Itta	Lyrics; Music; Arrangement	FlyingDog
2019	"Hana wa Maboroshi"	YuNi	Clear/Color	Music; Arrangement	Yunion.Wave
2019	"Dilemma"	YuNi	Clear/Color	Music; Arrangement	Yunion.Wave
2019	"Calling"	Teresa	Hybrid	Lyrics; Music	Nippon Columbia
