= School Food Punishment =

Japanese band

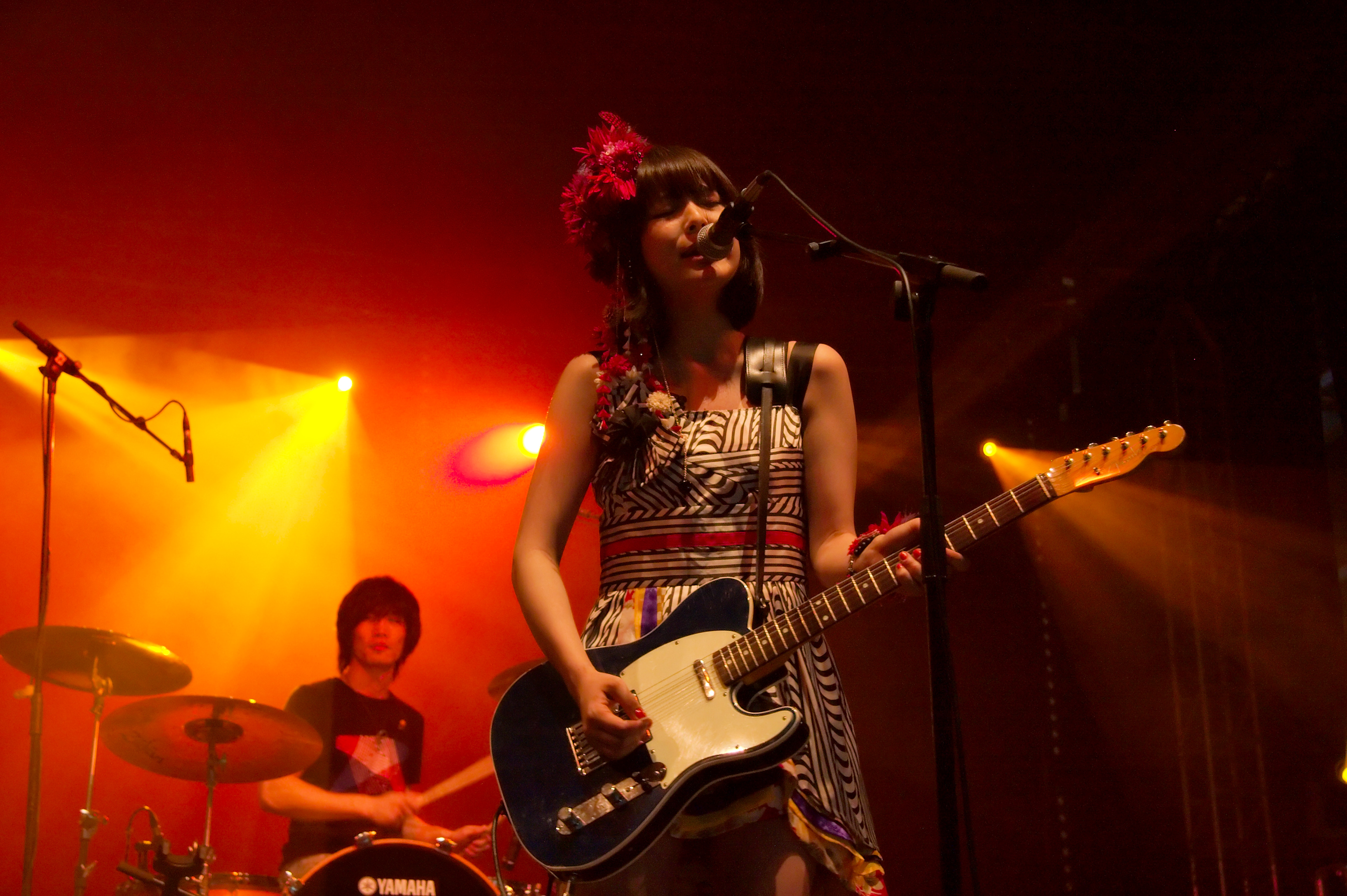
- School Food Punishment at Japan Expo 2009

Background information
- Origin: Tokyo, Japan
- Genres: Avant pop Post rock Electronica; Ambient music Downtempo
- Years active: 2004–2012
- Labels: July Records/United Asia Entertainment (2007); Fiveman Army Rocks (2008–2009); Epic Records Japan (2009–2012)
- Past members: Yumi Uchimura (vocals, guitar, lyrics); Masayuki Hasuo (keyboard); Hideaki Yamasaki (bass, chorus); Osamu Hidai (drums)

School Food Punishment (スクール フード パニッシュメント, Sukūru Fūdo Panisshumento) was a four-member Japanese band. They were signed to Sony Music Japan's Epic Records Japan record label prior to their breakup in June 2012. The lyrics of each of the band's songs were written by lead vocalist and guitarist Yumi Uchimura.

== Band history ==
The band was formed in October 2004 by Uchimura, while their first live performance took place in December of the same year. In 2007, their debut album, school food is good food, was released. In 2008, both of their songs, "feedback" and "Futari Umi no Soko" were featured as theme songs to the Japanese television drama Joshidaisei Kaikeishi no Jikenbo, while their mini-album "Riff-rain" was released by Tower Records and sold out in under a week. They also performed in numerous live concerts, including FM802, part of the Minami Wheel 2008 live event, and the J-Wave Live event, part of the Tokyo Real Eyes Live Supernova.

In 2009 they signed onto their first major record label, Sony Music Japan's Epic Records Japan division. Their major label debut is "futuristic imagination", which is the ending theme to the Kenji Kamiyama anime television series Eden of the East, airing on the highly rated noitaminA timeslot on Fuji TV. Amongst their first projects was contributing to Judy and Mary's 15th Anniversary Tribute Album, in which they covered the band's "Brand New Wave Upper Ground" song, with their performance praised by sources such as The Japan Times as having been the highlight of the album and having evoked Judy and Mary's songwriting and musical values.

In 2012 the band announced that it would be going on an indefinite hiatus. The band said the decision came as a result of discussions between the four members.

On June 11, 2012, School Food Punishment announced that they had broken up due to vocalist Yumi Uchimura having left the band.

Following the dissolution of School Food Punishment, Yumi Uchimura, producer Ryo Eguchi and touring guitarist Ritsuo Mitsui joined the band La La Larks known as successor of School Food Punishment. In 2016, Masayuki Hasuo and Hideaki Yamasaki had a new singer Annabel and formed the band siraph, too.

== Members ==
- Yumi Uchimura (born on September 6, 1983, from Chiba): Lead vocals, guitars, songwriter
  - Founder of the band.
- Masayuki Hasuo (born on February 7, 1983, from Niigata): Keyboards, organ, electric piano, composer
- Hideaki Yamasaki (born on December 4, 1974, from Tottori Prefecture): Bass guitar, backing vocals, composer
  - Joined the band in 2008, after scope (who left in 2002) and Watanabe (who left in 2004).
- Osamu Hidai (born on November 24, 1981, from Kanagawa): Drums, composer
  - Joined the band in 2007. At first, he worked for two different bands, this band and Current of air.

Past members

- Atsushi Ueda: Bass guitar
  - Left the band in 2008.
- Katsuya Katano: Drums
  - Left the band in 2007.

== Discography ==
=== Studio albums ===
Title	Album details	Peak chart positions	Sales
Title	Album details	JPN	Sales
Amp-Reflection	Released: April 14, 2010; Label: Epic Records Japan; Formats: CD, digital download, streaming	9	JPN: 20,000
Prog-Roid	Released: July 13, 2011; Label: Epic Records Japan; Formats: CD, digital download, streaming	14	JPN: 10,000

=== Extended plays ===
Title	Album details
School Food is Good Food	Released: April 4, 2007; Label: July Records/UAE; Formats: CD, digital download, streaming
Air Feel, Color Swim	Released: November 21, 2007; Label: July Records/UAE; Formats: CD, digital download, streaming
Riff‐rain	Released: December 10, 2008; Label: Fiveman Army Rocks; Formats: CD, digital download

=== Singles ===
List of singles as lead artist
Title	Year	Peak chart positions		Sales	Album
Title	Year	JPN	JPN Hot 100	Sales	Album
"Feedback" / "Futari Umi no Soko"	2008	—	—		Riff‐rain
"Futuristic Imagination"	2009	35	59	JPN: 6,000	Amp-Reflection
"Butterfly Swimmer"	2009	60	12	JPN: 2,500	Amp-Reflection
"Sea-through Communication"	2009	49	42	JPN: 1,500	Amp-Reflection
"Light Prayer"	2009	31	27	JPN: 6,000	Amp-Reflection
"Future Nova"	2010	18	25	JPN: 15,000	Amp-Reflection
"After Laughter"	2010	18	—	JPN: 15,000	Amp-Reflection
"Flashback Trip Syndrome"	2010	—	—		Prog-Roid
"RPG"	2011	20	46	JPN: 6,000	Prog-Roid
"How to Go"	2011	18	28	JPN: 10,500	Non-album single
"—" denotes a recording that did not chart or was not released in that territory.

=== Collaborations ===
- nextpop (released October 6, 2006)
  - Featured "pool".
- Judy and Mary 15th Anniversary Tribute Album (released March 18, 2009)
  - Performed cover of "Brand New Wave Upper Ground".

=== Demo albums ===
- 1st Demo (released May 2005)
- 2nd Demo (released May 2006)
