= COVID-19 vaccine clinical research =

Clinical research to establish the characteristics of COVID-19 vaccines

COVID-19 vaccine clinical research uses clinical research to establish the characteristics of COVID-19 vaccines. These characteristics include efficacy, effectiveness, and safety. As of November 2022, 40 vaccines are authorized by at least one national regulatory authority for public use:

- one DNA vaccine: ZyCoV-D
- four RNA vaccines: Pfizer–BioNTech, Moderna, Walvax, and Gemcovac
- twelve inactivated vaccines: Chinese Academy of Medical Sciences, CoronaVac, Covaxin, CoviVac, COVIran Barekat, FAKHRAVAC, Minhai-Kangtai, QazVac, Sinopharm BIBP, WIBP, Turkovac, and VLA2001.
- six viral vector vaccines: Sputnik Light, Sputnik V, Oxford–AstraZeneca, Convidecia, Janssen, and iNCOVACC
- sixteen subunit vaccines: Abdala, Corbevax, COVAX-19, EpiVacCorona, IndoVac, MVC-COV1901, Noora, Novavax, Razi Cov Pars, Sanofi–GSK, Sinopharm CNBG, Skycovione, Soberana 02, Soberana Plus, V-01, and ZF2001.
- one virus-like particle vaccine: CoVLP

== Formulation ==
A wide variety of technologies are being used to formulate vaccines against COVID-19. The development and deployment of mRNA vaccines and viral vector vaccines has been outstandingly rapid and can be described as revolutionary. However, global vaccine equity against COVID-19 has not been achieved. Conventional vaccine manufacturing approaches using whole inactivated virus (WIV), protein-based subunit vaccines, and virus-like particles (VLPs) may offer advantages in the development of vaccines for use in low- and middle-income countries (LMICs) and in addressing vaccine access gaps.

Many vaccine candidates use adjuvants to enhance immunogenicity, as part of the delivery system or as an accompanying immune stimulant. Vaccine adjuvant formulations using aluminum salts or "alum" may be particularly effective for technologies using inactivated COVID-19 virus and for recombinant protein-based or vector-based vaccines.

== Status ==
=== Clinical trials ===
The clinical trial process typically consists of three phases, each following the success of the prior phase. Trials are doubly blind in that neither the researcher nor the subject know whether they receive the vaccine or a placebo. Each phase involves randomly-selected subjects who are randomly assigned to serve either as recipients are controls:

- Phase I trials test primarily for safety and preliminary dosing in healthy subjects. Dozens of subjects.
- Phase II trials evaluate immunogenicity, dose levels (efficacy based on biomarkers) and adverse effects. Hundreds of subjects. Sometimes Phase I and II trials are combined.
- Phase III trials typically involve more participants at multiple sites, include a control group, and test effectiveness of the vaccine to prevent the disease (an "interventional" or "pivotal" trial), while monitoring for adverse effects at the selected dose. Safety, efficacy, and clinical endpoints may vary, including the definition of side effects, infection or amount of transmission, and whether the vaccine prevents moderate or severe infection.

A clinical trial design in progress may adopt an "adaptive design". If accumulating data provide insights about the treatment, the endpoints or other aspects or the trial can be adjusted. Adaptive designs may shorten trial durations and use fewer subjects, possibly expediting decisions, avoiding duplication of research efforts, and enhancing coordination of design changes.

=== Vaccine candidates in human trials ===
The table below shows various vaccine candidates and the phases which they had completed per the references. Current phases are also shown along with other details.

COVID-19 candidate vaccines in Phase I–III trials

COVID‑19 vaccine candidates in Phase I–III trials
Vaccine candidates, developers, and sponsors	Country of origin	Type (technology)	Current phase (participants) design	Completed phase (Note: Latest Phase with published results.) (participants) Immune response	Pending authorization
Sanofi–GSK COVID-19 vaccine (VAT00008, Vidprevtyn); Sanofi Pasteur, GSK	France, United Kingdom	Subunit (SARS-CoV-2 S adjuvanted recombinant protein)	Phase III (37,430); A Parallel-group, Phase III, Multi-stage, Modified Double-blind, Multi-armed Study to Assess the Efficacy, Safety, and Immunogenicity of Two SARS-CoV-2 Adjuvanted Recombinant Protein Vaccines (Monovalent and Bivalent) for Prevention Against COVID-19 in Adults 18 Years of Age and Older. May 2021 – Mar 2023, Colombia, Dominican Republic, Ghana, Honduras, India (3,000), Japan, Kenya, Mexico, Nigeria, Pakistan, Sri Lanka, Uganda, United States	Phase I–II (1,160); Phase I-IIa (440): Immunogenicity and Safety of SARS-CoV-2 Recombinant Protein Vaccine Formulations (With or Without Adjuvant) in Healthy Adults 18 Years of Age and Older. Phase IIb (720): Immunogenicity and Safety of SARS-CoV-2 Recombinant Protein Vaccine With AS03 Adjuvant in Adults 18 Years of Age and Older. Sep 2020 – Apr 2022, United States	Emergency (5): EU; Canada; USA; UK; WHO
Nanocovax; Nanogen Pharmaceutical Biotechnology JSC	Vietnam	Subunit (SARS‑CoV‑2 recombinant spike protein with aluminum adjuvant)	Phase III (13,000); Adaptive, multicenter, randomized, double-blind, placebo-controlled Jun 2021 – Jul 2022, Vietnam	Phase I–II (620); Phase I (60): Open label, dose escalation. Phase II (560): Randomization, double-blind, multicenter, placebo-controlled. Dec 2020 – Jun 2021, Vietnam	Emergency (1): Vietnam
UB-612; United Biomedical, Inc, Vaxxinity, DASA	Brazil, Taiwan, United States	Subunit (Multitope peptide based S1-RBD-protein based vaccine)	Phase III (18,320); Phase IIb/III (7,320): Randomized, Multicenter, Double-Blind, Placebo Controlled, Dose-Response. Phase III (11,000); Jan 2021 – Mar 2023, Taiwan (phase 2b/3), India (phase 3)	Phase I–II (3,910); Phase 1 (60): Open-label study Phase IIa (3,850): Placebo-controlled, Randomized, Observer-blind Study. Sep 2020 – Jan 2021, Taiwan	Emergency (1): Taiwan
SCB-2019; Clover Biopharmaceuticals, Dynavax Technologies, CEPI	China	Subunit (spike protein trimeric subunit with combined CpG 1018 and aluminium adjuvant)	Phase III (30,300); Phase II/III (30,000): Randomized, double-blind, controlled. Phase III (300): Double-blind, randomized, controlled. Mar 2021 – Oct 2022, Belgium, Brazil, Colombia, Dominican Republic, Germany, Nepal, Panama, the Philippines, Poland, South Africa, Ukraine	Phase I–II (950); Phase I (150): Randomized, Double-blind, Placebo-controlled, First-in-human. Phase II (800): Multi-center, Double-blind, Randomized, Controlled. Jun 2020 – Oct 2021, Australia (phase 1), China (phase 2)	Emergency (1): WHO
S-268019; Shionogi	Japan	Subunit	Phase III (54,915); Phase II/III: Open-label. Phase III: Randomized, observer-blind, placebo-controlled cross-over. Oct 2021 – Dec 2022, Japan (3,100), Vietnam	Phase I–II (300); Randomized, double-blind, placebo-controlled, parallel-group. Dec 2020 – Aug 2021, Japan	
West China Hospital COVID-19 vaccine Jiangsu Province Centers for Disease Control and Prevention, West China Hospital (WestVac Biopharma), Sichuan University	China	Subunit (recombinant with Sf9 cell)	Phase III (40,000); Multicenter, randomized, double-blind, placebo-controlled. Jun 2021 – Feb 2022, Indonesia, Kenya, Malaysia, Mexico, Nepal, the Philippines (5,000)	Phase I–II (5,128); Phase I (168): Single-center, Randomized, Placebo-controlled, Double-blind. Phase IIa (960):Single-center, Randomized, Double-Blinded, Placebo-Controlled. Phase IIb (4,000):Single-center, Randomized, Double-Blinded, Placebo-Controlled. Aug 2020 – May 2021, China	
DelNS1-2019-nCoV-RBD-OPT (DelNS1-nCoV-RBD LAIV); Beijing Wantai Biological Pharmacy, University of Hong Kong, Xiamen University	China, Hong Kong	Replicating viral vector (influenza virus vector that expresses the SARS-CoV-2 receptor-binding domain)	Phase III (40,000); Multi-center, Randomized, Double-blind, Placebo controlled. Oct 2021 – Apr 2022, the Philippines	Phase I–II (895); Phase I (60+115=175); Phase II (720); Sep 2020 – Sep 2022, China (60), Hong Kong (115)	
Versamune-CoV-2FC; Farmacore Biotechnology, PDS Biotechnology Corporation, Faculty of Medicine of Ribeirão Preto	Brazil, United States	Subunit	Phase III (30,000); Double-blind, randomized controlled. Aug–Dec 2021, Brazil	Phase I–II (360); Double-blind, randomized controlled. Mar–Aug 2021, Brazil	
Walvax COVID-19 vaccine (ARCoV); PLA Academy of Military Science, Walvax Biotech, Suzhou Abogen Biosciences	China	RNA	Phase III (28,000); Multi-center, Randomized, Double-blind, Placebo-controlled; May–Nov 2021, China, Colombia, Indonesia, Malaysia, Mexico, Nepal, Pakistan, the Philippines, Turkey	Phase I–II (908); Phase I (168); Phase II (420); Phase I/II (320); Jun 2020 – Oct 2021, China	
V-01; Livzon Mabpharm, Inc.	China	Subunit (SARS-CoV-2 recombinant fusion protein)	Phase III (22,500); Global, multi-center, randomized, double-blind, placebo-controlled. Aug 2021–Mar 2023, the Philippines	Phase I (1,060); Phase I (180): Single-center, randomized, double-blind and placebo-controlled. Phase II (880): Randomized, double-blind, and placebo-controlled. Feb–May 2021, China	
ARCT-154 (VBC-COV19-154 in Vietnam); Arcturus Therapeutics, Vinbiocare	United States, Vietnam	RNA	Phase III (20,600); Phase IIIa (600): Randomized, double-blinded, placebo controlled. Phase IIIb (20,000): Randomized, double-blinded, placebo controlled. Oct-Dec 2021, Vietnam	Phase I–II (400); Phase I (100): Randomized, double-blinded, placebo controlled. Phase II (300): Randomized, double-blinded, placebo controlled. Aug-Oct 2021, Vietnam	
ReCOV; Jiangsu Rec-Biotechnology Co Ltd	China	Subunit (Recombinant two-component spike and RBD protein (CHO cell))	Phase II–III (20,301); Multi-center, randomized, double-blind, placebo-controlled. Dec 2021–Dec 2022, China, New Zealand, the Philippines	Phase I (160); First-in-human, randomized, double-blind, placebo-controlled, dose-finding. Jun–Dec 2021, New Zealand	
BriLife (IIBR-100); The Israel Institute for Biological Research	Israel	Vesicular stomatitis vector (recombinant)	Phase III (20,000); Randomized, multi-center, placebo-controlled. Sept – Dec 2021, Israel	Phase I–II (1,040); Randomized, multi-center, placebo-controlled, dose-escalation. Oct 2020 – May 2021, Israel	
Zhongyianke Biotech–Liaoning Maokangyuan Biotech COVID-19 vaccine Zhongyianke Biotech, Liaoning Maokangyuan Biotech, Academy of Military Medical Sciences	China	Subunit (Recombinant)	Phase III (14,600); International multicenter, randomized, double-blind, placebo-controlled. Sep 2021–?, China	Phase I–II (696); Phase I (216): Randomized, placebo-controlled, double-blind. Phase II (480): Single-center, randomized, double blinded, placebo controlled. Oct 2020 – Jul 2021, China	
GX-19 (GX-19N); Genexine consortium, International Vaccine Institute	South Korea	DNA	Phase II–III (14,000); Randomized, double-blinded, placebo-controlled. Oct 2021 – Oct 2022, Indonesia, Seoul	Phase I–II (410); Phase I-II (170+210+30): Multi-center, some open-labeled, some double-blinded, single arm, randomized, placebo-controlled Jun 2020 – Jul 2021, Seoul	
GRAd-COV2; ReiThera, Lazzaro Spallanzani National Institute for Infectious Diseases	Italy	Adenovirus vector (modified gorilla adenovirus vector, GRAd)	Phase III (10,300); Randomized, stratified, observer-blind, placebo-controlled. Mar–Oct 2021, Italy	Phase I (90); Subjects (two groups: 18–55 and 65–85 years old) randomly receiving one of three escalating doses of GRAd-COV2 or a placebo, then monitored over a 24-week period. 93% of subjects who received GRAd-COV2 developed anti-bodies. Aug–Dec 2020, Rome	
Inovio COVID-19 Vaccine (INO-4800); Inovio, CEPI, Korea National Institute of Health, International Vaccine Institute	South Korea, United States	DNA vaccine (plasmid delivered by electroporation)	Phase III (7,517); Randomized, placebo-controlled, multi-center. Nov 2020 – Jan 2023, Brazil, Colombia, Mexico, the Philippines, United States (Note: Phase I–IIa in South Korea in parallel with Phase II–III in the US)	Phase I–II (920); Phase Ia (120): Open-label trial. Phase Ib-IIa (160): Dose-Ranging Trial. Phase II (640): Randomized, double-blinded, placebo-controlled, dose-finding. April 2020 – Feb 2022, China (phase II), South Korea (phase Ib-IIa), United States	
DS-5670; Daiichi Sankyo	Japan	RNA	Phase II–III (5,028); Randomized, Active-comparator, Observer-blind. Dec 2021 – Jul 2023, Japan	Phase I–II (152); A Phase 1/2 Study to Assess the Safety, Immunogenicity and Recommended Dose of DS-5670a (COVID-19 Vaccine) in Japanese Healthy Adults and Elderly Subjects. Mar 2021 – Jul 2022, Japan	
GBP510; SK Bioscience Co. Ltd., GSK	South Korea, United Kingdom	Subunit (Recombinant protein nanoparticle with adjuvanted with AS03)	Phase III (4,000); Randomized, active-controlled, observer-blind, parallel-group, multi-center. Aug 2021-Mar 2022, South Korea	Phase I–II (580); Phase I-II (260-320): Placebo-controlled, randomized, observer-blinded, dose-finding. Jan–Aug 2021, South Korea	
HGC019; Gennova Biopharmaceuticals, HDT Biotech Corporation	India, United States	RNA	Phase II–III (4,400); A prospective, multicentre, randomized, active-controlled (with COVISHIELD), observer-blind study to evaluate safety, tolerability and immunogenicity in healthy adults. Phase II (400); Phase III (4,000); Sep 2021 – Sep 2022, India	Phase I–II (620); Randomized, phase I/II, placebo-controlled, dose-ranging, parallel-group, crossover, multi-centre study to evaluate the safety, tolerability and immunogenicity in healthy adult subjects. Phase I (120) open-label study in healthy 18-70 year-olds. Phase II (500) observer-blind study in healthy 18-75 year-olds. Apr 2021 – Oct 2021, India	
KD-414; KM Biologics Co	Japan	Inactivated SARS‑CoV‑2	Phase II–III (2,000); Multicenter, open-label, non-randomized. Oct 2021 – Mar 2023, Japan	Phase I–II (210); Randomized, double blind, placebo control, parallel group. Mar 2021 – Dec 2022, Japan	
LYB001; Yantai Patronus Biotech Co., Ltd	China	Virus-like particle	Phase II–III (1,900); Phase II: Randomized, double blinded, placebo-controlled Phase III: Single-armed, open-label expanded. Jan 2022 – Mar 2023, Laos	Phase I (100); Randomized, double blinded, placebo-controlled. Dec 2021 – Feb 2022, Laos	
AKS-452; Akston Biosciences, University Medical Center Groningen	Netherlands	Subunit	Phase II–III (1,600); Randomized, double-blinded, placebo-controlled, parallel-group, multi-centre, adaptive, seamless bridging. Oct 2021–Dec 2022, India	Phase I–II (112); Non-randomized, Single-center, open-label, combinatorial. Apr–Sep 2021, Netherlands	
AG0302-COVID‑19; AnGes Inc., AMED	Japan	DNA vaccine (plasmid)	Phase II–III (500); Randomized, double-blind, placebo controlled Nov 2020 – Apr 2021, Japan	Phase I–II (30); Randomized/non-randomized, single-center, two doses Jun–Nov 2020, Osaka	
202-CoV; Shanghai Zerun Biotechnology Co., Ltd., Walvax Biotech	China	Subunit (Spike protein (CHO cell) 202-CoV with CpG / alum adjuvant)	Phase II (1,056); Randomized, Double-blinded, Placebo-controlled. July–Dec 2021, China	Phase I (144); Randomized, double-blinded, placebo-controlled. July–Dec 2021, China	
Vaxart COVID-19 vaccine Vaxart	United States	Viral vector	Phase II (896); Double-Blind, Multi-Center, Randomized, Placebo-Controlled, Dose-Ranging. Oct 2021 – Mar 2022, United States	Phase I (83); Phase Ia (35): Double-blind, randomized, placebo-controlled, first-in-Human. Phase Ib (48): Multicenter, randomized, double-blind, placebo-controlled. Sep 2020 – Aug 2021, United States	
PTX-COVID19-B; Providence Therapeutics	Canada	RNA	Phase II (890); Randomized, double-dummy, observer-blind. Aug 2021–Feb 2022, Canada	Phase I (60); First-in-Human, Observer-Blinded, Randomized, Placebo Controlled. Jan–May 2021, Canada	
Unnamed; Ningbo Rong’an Biological Pharmaceutical Co., Ltd.	China	Inactivated SARS‑CoV‑2	Phase II (600); Randomized, double-blind, placebo-controlled. Oct 2021 – Mar 2022, China	Phase I (150); Randomized, double-blind, placebo-controlled. Aug – Oct 2021, China	
Unnamed; Tsinghua University, Tianjin Medical University, Walvax Biotech	China	Viral vector	Phase II (360); Jul–Nov 2021, China	Phase I (60); May–Jun 2021, China	
INNA-051; Ena Respiratory	Australia	Viral vector	Phase II (423); Randomized, double-blind, placebo-controlled. Mar – Dec 2022, Australia	Phase I (124); Randomised, double blind, placebo-controlled. Jun – Oct 2021, Australia	
mRNA-1283; Moderna	United States	RNA	Phase II (420); Randomized, stratified, observer-blind. Dec 2021 – Jan 2023, United States	Phase I (106); Randomized, observer-blind, dose-ranging study. Mar 2021 – Apr 2022, United States	
Unnamed; Ihsan Gursel, Scientific and Technological Research Council of Turkey	Turkey	Virus-like particle	Phase II (330); Randomized, parallel dose assigned, double blind, multi center. Jun – Sep 2021, Turkey	Phase I (36) double-blinded, randomised, placebo controlled. Mar – May 2021, Turkey	
COH04S1; GeoVax, City of Hope Medical Center	United States	Viral vector	Phase II (240); Multi-center, observer-blinded, EUA vaccine-controlled, randomized. Aug 2021 – Jun 2023, California	Phase I (129); Dose Escalation Study. Dec 2020 – Nov 2022, California	
ABNCoV2; Bavarian Nordic. Radboud University Nijmegen	Denmark, Netherlands	Virus-like particle	Phase II (210); Single center, sequential dose-escalation, open labelled trial. Aug–Dec 2021, Germany	Phase I (42); Single center, sequential dose-escalation, open labelled trial. Mar–Dec 2021, Netherlands	
SCB-2020S; Clover Biopharmaceuticals	China	Subunit	Phase I–II (150); Randomized, controlled, observer-blind. Aug 2021 – Apr 2022, Australia	Preclinical	
SCTV01C; Sinocelltech	China	Subunit	Phase I–II (1,712); 540+420+752=1,712: multicenter, randomized, double-blinded trial. Aug 2021 – Jun 2023, China	Preclinical	
NDV-HXP-S (ButanVac, COVIVAC, HXP-GPOVac, Patria); Icahn School of Medicine at Mount Sinai, Institute of Vaccines and Medical Biologicals, Butantan Institute, Laboratorio Avimex, National Council of Science and Technology, Mahidol University, University of Texas at Austin	Brazil, Mexico, Thailand, United States, Vietnam	Newcastle disease virus (NDV) vector (expressing the spike protein of SARS-CoV-2, with or without the adjuvant CpG 1018)/Inactivated SARS‑CoV‑2	Phase I–II (12,750); Randomized, placebo-controlled, observer-blind. Mar 2021 – May 2022; Brazil (5,394), Mexico (Phase I: 90, Phase II: 396), Thailand (460), United States (Phase I: 35), Vietnam (495)	Preclinical	
Stemirna COVID-19 vaccine Stemirna Therapeutics Co. Ltd.	China	RNA	Phase I–II (880); Phase I (240): Randomized, double-blind, placebo-controlled. Phase I/II (640): Open-label. Mar 2021–Feb 2022, China (phase I), Lao (phase I/II)	Preclinical	
ARCT-021; Arcturus Therapeutics, Duke–NUS Medical School	United States, Singapore	RNA	Phase I–II (798); Phase I/II (92): Randomized, double-blinded, placebo controlled Phase II (600): Randomized, observer-blind, placebo-controlled, multiregional, multicenter trial in healthy adults to evaluate the safety, reactogenicity, and immunogenicity. Phase IIa (106): Open label extension trial to assess the safety and long-term immunogenicity by giving single-dose vaccine to the participants from the parent study that received placebo or were seronegative at screening. Aug 2020 – Apr 2022, Singapore, United States (phase IIa)	Preclinical	
Unnamed; PT Bio Farma	Indonesia	Subunit	Phase I–II (780); Observer-Blind, Randomized, Controlled. Oct 2021 – Jan 2022, Indonesia	Preclinical	
VBI-2902; Variation Biotechnologies	United States	Virus-like particle	Phase I (141); Randomized, observer-blind, dose-escalation, placebo-controlled Mar 2021 – Nov 2022, Canada	Preclinical	
ICC Vaccine; Novavax	United States	Subunit	Phase I–II (640); Randomized, observer-blinded. Sep 2021 – Mar 2022, Australia	Preclinical	
EuCorVac-19; EuBiologics Co	South Korea	Subunit (spike protein using the recombinant protein technology and with an adjuvant)	Phase I–II (280); Dose-exploration, randomized, observer-blind, placebo-controlled Feb 2021 – Mar 2022, the Philippines (phase II), South Korea (phase I/II)	Preclinical	
PHH-1V; Hipra	Spain	Subunit	Phase I–II (286); Phase I/IIa (30): Randomized, controlled, observer-blinded, dose-escalation. Phase IIb (256): Randomized, controlled, observer-blinded. Aug–Dec 2021, Spain (phase I/IIa), Vietnam (phase IIb)	Preclinical	
RBD SARS-CoV-2 HBsAg VLP; SpyBiotech	United Kingdom	Virus-like particle	Phase I–II (280); Randomized, placebo-controlled, multi-center. Aug 2020 – ?, Australia	Preclinical	
AV-COVID-19; AIVITA Biomedical, Inc., Ministry of Health (Indonesia)	United States, Indonesia	Dendritic cell vaccine (autologous dendritic cells previously loaded ex vivo with SARS-CoV-2 spike protein, with or without GM-CSF)	Phase I–II (202); Adaptive. Dec 2020 – Feb 2022, Indonesia (phase I), United States (phase I/II)	Preclinical	
COVID-eVax; Takis Biotech	Italy	DNA	Phase I–II (160); Multicenter, open label. Phase I: First-in-human, dose escalation. Phase II: single arm or two arms, randomized, dose expansion. Feb–Sep 2021, Italy	Preclinical	
BBV154; Bharat Biotech	India	Adenovirus vector (intranasal)	Phase I–II (375); Phase I (175): Randomized, double-blinded, multicenter. Phase II (200): Randomized, double blind, multicenter. Mar 2021–?, India	Preclinical	
VB10.2129 and VB10.2210; Nykode Therapeutics	Norway	DNA	Phase I–II (160); Open Label, Dose Escalation. Oct 2021–Jun 2022, Norway	Preclinical	
ChulaCov19; Chulalongkorn University	Thailand	RNA	Phase I–II (72); Phase 1 (72): single-center, dose-escalation, first in human study in 2 age groups: 18-55 years-old and 56-75 years-old. Phase 2: Multi-center, observer-blinded, placebo-controlled study to assess the safety, reactogenicity, and immunogenicity in healthy adults between 18-75 years old. May-September 2021, Thailand	Preclinical	
COVID‑19/aAPC; Shenzhen Genoimmune Medical Institute	China	Lentiviral vector (with minigene modifying aAPCs)	Phase I (100); Single group, open-label study to evaluate safety and immunity. Feb 2020 – Jul 2023, Shenzhen	Preclinical	
LV-SMENP-DC; Shenzhen Genoimmune Medical Institute	China	Lentiviral vector (with minigene modifying DCs)	Phase I–II (100); Single-group, open label, multi-center study to evaluate safety and efficacy. Mar 2020 – Jul 2023, Shenzhen	Preclinical	
ImmunityBio COVID-19 vaccine (hAd5); ImmunityBio	United States	Viral vector	Phase I–II (540); Phase 1/2 Study of the Safety, Reactogenicity, and Immunogenicity of a Subcutaneously- and Orally- Administered Supplemental Spike & Nucleocapsid-targeted COVID-19 Vaccine to Enhance T Cell Based Immunogenicity in Participants Who Have Already Received Prime + Boost Vaccines Authorized For Emergency Use. Oct 2020 – Sep 2021, South Africa, United States	Preclinical	
COVAC; VIDO (University of Saskatchewan)	Canada	Subunit (spike protein + SWE adjuvant)	Phase I (120); Randomized, observer-blind, dose-escalation. Feb 2021 – Apr 2023, Brazil Halifax	Preclinical	
COVI-VAC (CDX-005); Codagenix Inc.	United States	Attenuated	Phase I (48); First-in-human, randomised, double-blind, placebo-controlled, dose-escalation Dec 2020 – Jun 2021, United Kingdom	Preclinical	
CoV2 SAM (LNP); GSK	United Kingdom	RNA	Phase I (40); Open-label, dose escalation, non-randomized Feb–Jun 2021, United States	Preclinical	
COVIGEN; Bionet Asia, Technovalia, University of Sydney	Australia, Thailand	DNA	Phase I (150); Double-blind, dose-ranging, randomised, placebo-controlled. Feb 2021 – Jun 2022, Australia, Thailand	Preclinical	
MV-014-212; Meissa Vaccine Inc.	United States	Attenuated	Phase I (130); Randomized, double-blinded, multicenter. Mar 2021 – Oct 2022, United States	Preclinical	
KBP-201; Kentucky Bioprocessing	United States	Subunit	Phase I–II (180); First-in-human, observer-blinded, randomized, placebo-controlled, parallel group Dec 2020 – May 2022, United States	Preclinical	
AdCLD-CoV19; Cellid Co	South Korea	Viral vector	Phase I–II (150); Phase I: Dose Escalation, Single Center, Open. Phase IIa: Multicenter, Randomized, Open. Dec 2020 – Jul 2021, South Korea	Preclinical	
AdimrSC-2f; Adimmune Corporation	Taiwan	Subunit (Recombinant RBD +/− Aluminium)	Phase I–II (310); Phase I (70): Randomized, single center, open-label, dose-finding. Phase I/II (240): Placebo-controlled, randomized, double-blind, dose-finding. Aug 2020–Sep 2022, Indonesia (phase I/II), Taiwan (phase I)	Preclinical	
GLS-5310; GeneOne Life Science Inc.	South Korea	DNA	Phase I–II (345); Multicenter, Randomized, Combined Phase I Dose-escalation and Phase IIa Double-blind. Dec 2020 – Jul 2022, South Korea	Preclinical	
Covigenix VAX-001; Entos Pharmaceuticals Inc.	Canada	DNA	Phase I–II (72); Placebo-controlled, randomized, observer-blind, dose ranging adaptive. Mar–Aug 2021, Canada	Preclinical	
NBP2001; SK Bioscience Co. Ltd.	South Korea	Subunit (Recombinant protein with adjuvanted with alum)	Phase I (50); Placebo-controlled, Randomized, Observer-blinded, Dose-escalation. Dec 2020 – Apr 2021, South Korea	Preclinical	
CoVAC-1; University of Tübingen	Germany	Subunit (Peptide)	Phase I–II (104); Phase I (36): Placebo-controlled, Randomized, Observer-blinded, Dose-escalation. Phase I/II (68): B-pVAC-SARS-CoV-2: Phase I/II Multicenter Safety and Immunogenicity Trial of Multi-peptide Vaccination to Prevent COVID-19 Infection in Adults With Bcell/ Antibody Deficiency. Nov 2020 – Feb 2022, Germany	Preclinical	
bacTRL-Spike; Symvivo	Canada	DNA	Phase I (24); Randomized, observer-blind, placebo-controlled. Nov 2020 – Feb 2022, Australia	Preclinical	
ChAdV68-S (SAM-LNP-S); NIAID, Gritstone Oncology	United States	Viral vector	Phase I (150); Open-label, dose and age escalation, parallel design. Mar 2021 – Sep 2022, United States	Preclinical	
SpFN COVID-19 vaccine WRAIR's Emerging Infectious Diseases Branch (EIDB)	United States	Subunit	Phase I (72); Randomized, double-blind, placebo-controlled. Apr 2021 – Oct 2022, United States	Preclinical	
MVA-SARS-2-S (MVA-SARS-2-ST); University Medical Center Hamburg-Eppendorf	Germany	Viral vector	Phase I–II (270); Phase I (30): Open, Single-center. Phase Ib/IIa (240): Multi-center, Randomized Controlled. Oct 2020 – Mar 2022, Germany	Preclinical	
Koçak-19 Inaktif Adjuvanlı COVID-19 vaccine Kocak Farma	Turkey	Inactivated SARS‑CoV‑2	Phase I (38); Phase 1 Study for the Determination of Safety and Immunogenicity of Different Strengths of Koçak-19 Inaktif Adjuvanlı COVID-19 Vaccine, Given Twice Intramuscularly to Healthy Volunteers, in a Placebo Controlled Study Design. Mar–Jun 2021, Turkey	Preclinical	
CoV2-OGEN1; Syneos Health, US Specialty Formulations	United States	Subunit	Phase I (45); First-In-Human; Jun–Dec 2021, New Zealand	Preclinical	
CoVepiT; OSE Immunotherapeutics	France	Subunit	Phase I (48); Randomized, open label. Apr–Sept 2021, France	Preclinical	
HDT-301 (QTP104); HDT Biotech Corporation, Senai Cimatec, Quartis	Brazil, South Korea, United States	RNA	Phase I (189); Phase I (90+63+36): Randomized, open-label, dose-escalation. Aug 2021–Jul 2023, Brazil, South Korea, United States	Preclinical	
SC-Ad6-1; Tetherex Pharmaceuticals	United States	Viral vector	Phase I (40); First-In-Human, Open-label, Single Ascending Dose and Multidose. Jun–Dec 2021, Australia	Preclinical	
Unnamed; Osman ERGANIS, Scientific and Technological Research Council of Turkey	Turkey	Inactivated SARS‑CoV‑2	Phase I (50); Phase I Study Evaluating the Safety and Efficacy of the Protective Adjuvanted Inactivated Vaccine Developed Against SARS-CoV-2 in Healthy Participants, Administered as Two Injections Subcutaneously in Two Different Dosages. Apr–Oct 2021, Turkey	Preclinical	
EXG-5003; Elixirgen Therapeutics, Fujita Health University	Japan, United States	RNA	Phase I–II (60); First in Human, randomized, placebo-controlled. Apr 2021 – Jan 2023, Japan	Preclinical	
IVX-411; Icosavax, Seqirus Inc.	United States	Virus-like particle	Phase I–II (168); Phase I/II (84): Randomized, observer-blinded, placebo-controlled. Jun 2021–2022, Australia	Preclinical	
QazCoVac-P; Research Institute for Biological Safety Problems	Kazakhstan	Subunit	Phase I–II (244); Phase I: Randomized, blind, placebo-controlled. Phase II: Randomized, open phase. Jun – Dec 2021, Kazakhstan	Preclinical	
LNP-nCOV saRNA-02; MRC/UVRI & LSHTM Uganda Research Unit	Uganda	RNA	Phase I (42); A Clinical Trial to Assess the Safety and Immunogenicity of LNP-nCOV saRNA-02, a Self-amplifying Ribonucleic Acid (saRNA) Vaccine, in SARS-CoV-2 Seronegative and Seropositive Uganda Population. Sep 2021 – Jun 2022, Uganda	Preclinical	
Baiya SARS-CoV-2 Vax 1 Baiya Phytopharm Co Ltd.	Thailand	Plant-based Subunit (RBD-Fc + adjuvant)	Phase I (96); Randomized, open-label, dose-finding. Sep–Dec 2021, Thailand	Preclinical	
CVXGA1; CyanVac LLC	United States	Viral vector	Phase I (80); Open-label; July–Dec 2021, United States	Preclinical	
Unnamed; St. Petersburg Scientific Research Institute of Vaccines and Sera of Russia at the Federal Medical Biological Agency	Russia	Subunit (Recombinant)	Phase I–II (200); Jul–Aug 2021, Russia	Preclinical	
LVRNA009; Liverna Therapeutics Inc.	China	RNA	Phase I (24); July–Nov 2021, China	Preclinical	
ARCT-165; Arcturus Therapeutics	United States	RNA	Phase I–II (72); Randomized, observer-blind. Aug 2021–Mar 2023, Singapore, United States	Preclinical	
BCD-250; Biocad	Russia	Viral vector	Phase I–II (160); Randomized, double-blind, placebo-controlled, adaptive, seamless phase I/II. Aug 2021–Aug 2022, Russia	Preclinical	
COVID-19-EDV; EnGeneIC	Australia	Viral vector	Phase I (18); Open label, non-randomised, dose escalation. Aug 2021–Jan 2022, Australia	Preclinical	
COVIDITY; Scancell	United Kingdom	DNA	Phase I (40); Open-label, two-arm. Sep 2021–Apr 2022, South Africa	Preclinical	
SII Vaccine; Novavax	United States	Subunit	Phase I–II (240) randomized, observer-blinded, open-label. Oct–Nov 2021, Australia	Preclinical	
EG-COVID; Eyegene	South Korea	mRNA	Phase I–II (120); Phase I/IIa: Multi-center, Open-label. Feb 2022–May 2023, South Korea	Preclinical	
PIKA COVID-19 vaccine Yisheng Biopharma	China	Subunit	Phase I (45); Open-label, dose-escalation. Sep–Nov 2021, New Zealand	Preclinical	
Ad5-triCoV/Mac; McMaster University, Canadian Institutes of Health Research (CIHR)	Canada	Viral vector	Phase I (30); Open-label. Nov 2021–Jun 2023, Canada	Preclinical	
Unnamed; University of Hong Kong, Immuno Cure 3 Limited	Hong Kong	DNA	Phase I (30); Randomized, double-blinded, placebo-controlled, dose-escalation. Nov 2021–Jun 2022, Hong Kong	Preclinical	
MigVax-101; Oravax Medical	Israel	Virus-like particle	Phase I Oct 2021–?, South Africa	Preclinical	
IN-B009; HK inno.N	South Korea	Subunit (Recombinant protein)	Phase I (40); Open-label, dose-escalation. Sep 2021–Feb 2023, South Korea	Preclinical	
naNO-COVID; Emergex Vaccines	United Kingdom	Subunit	Phase I (26); Double-blind, randomized, vehicle-controlled, dose-finding. Nov 2021–Sep 2022, Switzerland	Preclinical	
Betuvax-CoV-2; Human Stem Cells Institute	Russia	Subunit	Phase I–II (170); Sep 2021–?, Russia	Preclinical	
Covi Vax; National Research Centre	Egypt	Inactivated SARS‑CoV‑2	Phase I (72); Randomized, open-labeled Nov 2021–Feb 2023, Egypt	Preclinical	
VLPCOV-01; VLP Therapeutics	United States	mRNA	Phase I (45); Randomized, placebo-controlled, parallel group, first-in-human. Aug 2021–Jan 2023, Japan	Preclinical	
GRT-R910; Gritstone Oncology	United States	mRNA	Phase I (120); A Phase 1 Trial to Evaluate the Safety, Immunogenicity, and Reactogenicity of a Self-Amplifying mRNA Prophylactic Vaccine Boost Against SARS-CoV-2 in Previously Vaccinated Healthy Elderly Adults. Sep 2021–Nov 2022, United Kingdom	Preclinical	
Unnamed; DreamTec Limited	Hong Kong	Subunit	Phase I (30); Development of a COVID19 Oral Vaccine Consisting of Bacillus Subtilis Spores Expressing and Displaying the Receptor Binding Domain of Spike Protein of SARS-COV2. Apr–Dec 2021, Hong Kong	Preclinical	
Almansour-001; Imam Abdulrahman Bin Faisal University, ICON plc	Ireland, Saudi Arabia	DNA	Phase I (30); Single center, randomized, observer blind, dosage finding. Feb–Jul 2022, Ireland, Saudi Arabia	Preclinical	
Unnamed; North's Academy of Medical Science Medical biology institute	North Korea	Subunit (spike protein with Angiotensin-converting enzyme 2)	Phase I–II (?); Jul 2020, North Korea	Preclinical	
Vabiotech COVID-19 vaccine Vaccine and Biological Production Company No. 1 (Vabiotech)	Vietnam	Subunit	Preclinical; Awaited for the conduct on Phase I trial.	?	
INO-4802; Inovio	United States	DNA	Preclinical; Awaited for the conduct on Phase I/II trials.	?	
Bangavax (Bancovid); Globe Biotech Ltd. of Bangladesh	Bangladesh	RNA	Preclinical; Awaiting for approval from Bangladesh government to conduct the first clinical trial.	?	
Unnamed; Indian Immunologicals, Griffith University	Australia, India	Attenuated	Preclinical	?	
EPV-CoV-19; EpiVax	United States	Subunit (T cell epitope-based protein)	Preclinical	?	
Unnamed; Intravacc	Netherlands	Subunit	Preclinical	?	
CureVac–GSK COVID-19 vaccine CureVac, GSK	Germany, United Kingdom	RNA	Preclinical	?	
DYAI-100 Sorrento Therapeutics, Dyadic International, Inc.	United States	Subunit	Preclinical	?	
Unnamed; Ministry of Health (Malaysia), Malaysia Institute of Medical Research Malaysia, Universiti Putra Malaysia	Malaysia	RNA	Preclinical	?	
CureVac COVID-19 vaccine (CVnCoV); CureVac, CEPI	Germany	RNA (unmodified RNA)	Terminated (44,433); Phase 2b/3 (39,693): Multicenter efficacy and safety trial in adults. Phase 3 (2,360+180+1,200+1,000=4,740): Randomized, placebo-controlled, multicenter, some observer-blinded, some open-labeled. Nov 2020 – Jun 2022, Argentina, Belgium, Colombia, Dominican Republic, France, Germany, Mexico, Netherlands, Panama, Peru, Spain	Phase I–II (944); Phase I (284): Partially blind, controlled, dose-escalation to evaluate safety, reactogenicity and immunogenicity. Phase IIa (660):Partially observer-blind, multicenter, controlled, dose-confirmation. Jun 2020 – Oct 2021, Belgium (phase I), Germany (phase I), Panama (phase IIa), Peru (phase IIa)	Emergency (2): EU; Switzerland
CORVax12; OncoSec Medical, Providence Health & Services	United States	DNA	Terminated (36); Open-label, non-randomized, parallel assignment study to evaluate the safety of prime & boost doses with/without the combination of electroporated IL-12p70 plasmid in 2 age groups: 18-50 years-old and > 50 years-old. Dec 2020 – Jul 2021, United States	Preclinical	
Sanofi–Translate Bio COVID-19 vaccine (MRT5500); Sanofi Pasteur and Translate Bio	France, United States	RNA	Terminated (415); Interventional, randomized, parallel-group, sequential study consisting of a sentinel cohort followed by the full enrollment cohort. The sentinel cohort is an open-label, step-wise, dose-ranging study to evaluate the safety of 3 dose levels with 2 vaccinations. The full enrollment cohort is a quadruple-blinded study of safety and immunogenicity in 2 age groups, with half receiving a single injection, and the other half receiving 2 injections. Mar 2021 – Sep 2021, Honduras, United States, Australia	Preclinical	
AdCOVID; Altimmune Inc.	United States	Viral vector	Terminated (180); Double-blind, randomized, placebo-controlled, first-in-Human. Feb 2021 – Feb 2022, United States	Preclinical	
LNP-nCoVsaRNA; MRC clinical trials unit at Imperial College London	United Kingdom	RNA	Terminated (105); Randomized trial, with dose escalation study (15) and expanded safety study (at least 200); Jun 2020 – Jul 2021, United Kingdom	?	
TMV-083; Institut Pasteur	France	Viral vector	Terminated (90); Randomized, Placebo-controlled. Aug 2020 – Jun 2021, Belgium, France	?	
SARS-CoV-2 Sclamp/V451; UQ, Syneos Health, CEPI, Seqirus	Australia	Subunit (molecular clamp stabilized spike protein with MF59)	Terminated (120); Randomised, double-blind, placebo-controlled, dose-ranging. False positive HIV test found among participants. Jul–Oct 2020, Brisbane	?	
V590 and V591/MV-SARS-CoV-2 Merck & Co. (Themis BIOscience), Institut Pasteur, University of Pittsburgh's Center for Vaccine Research (CVR), CEPI	United States, France	Vesicular stomatitis virus vector / Measles virus vector	Terminated; In phase I, immune responses were inferior to those seen following natural infection and those reported for other SARS-CoV-2/COVID-19 vaccines.		

==== Homologous prime-boost vaccination ====
In July 2021, the U.S. Food and Drug Administration (FDA) and the Centers for Disease Control and Prevention (CDC) issued a joint statement reporting that a booster dose is not necessary for those who have been fully vaccinated.

In August 2021, the FDA and the CDC authorized the use of an additional mRNA vaccine dose for immunocompromised individuals. The authorization was extended to cover other specific groups in September 2021.

In October 2021, the FDA and the CDC authorized the use of either homologous or heterologous vaccine booster doses.

==== Heterologous prime-boost vaccination ====
The World Health Organization (WHO) defines heterologous prime-boost immunization as the "administration of two different vectors or delivery systems expressing the same or overlapping antigenic inserts." A heterologous scheme can sometimes be more immunogenic than some homologous schemes.

In October 2021, the FDA and the CDC authorized the use of either homologous or heterologous vaccine booster doses.

Some experts believe that heterologous prime-boost vaccination courses can boost immunity, and several studies have begun to examine this effect. Despite the absence of clinical data on the efficacy and safety of such heterologous combinations, Canada and several European countries have recommended a heterologous second dose for people who have received the first dose of the Oxford–AstraZeneca vaccine.

In February 2021, the Oxford Vaccine Group launched the Com-COV vaccine trial to investigate heterologous prime-boost courses of different COVID-19 vaccines. As of June 2021, the group is conducting two phase II studies: Com-COV and Com-COV2.

In Com-COV, the two heterologous combinations of the Oxford–AstraZeneca and Pfizer–BioNTech vaccines were compared with the two homologous combinations of the same vaccines, with an interval of 28 or 84 days between doses.

In Com-COV2, the first dose is the Oxford–AstraZeneca vaccine or the Pfizer vaccine, and the second dose is the Moderna vaccine, the Novavax vaccine, or a homologous vaccine equal to the first dose, with an interval of 56 or 84 days between doses.

A study in the UK is evaluating annual heterologous boosters by randomly combining the following vaccines: Oxford–AstraZeneca, Pfizer–BioNTech, Moderna, Novavax, VLA2001, CureVac, and Janssen.

On 16 December, WHO recommendations on heterologous vaccinations suggested a general trend of increased immunogenicity when one of the doses is of an mRNA vaccine, particularly as the last dose. The immunogenicity of a homologous mRNA course is roughly equivalent to a heterologous scheme involving a vector vaccine and an mRNA vaccine. However, the WHO has emphasized the need to address many evidence gaps in heterologous regimens, including duration of protection, optimal interval between doses, influence of fractional dosing, effectiveness against variants and long-term safety.

Heterologous second dose regimes in clinical trial
First dose	Second dose	Schedules	Current phase (participants), periods and locations
Oxford–AstraZeneca; Pfizer–BioNTech	Oxford–AstraZeneca; Pfizer–BioNTech	Days 0 and 28; Days 0 and 84	Phase II (820); Feb–Aug 2021, United Kingdom
Sputnik Light	Oxford–AstraZeneca; Moderna; Sinopharm BIBP		Phase II (121); Feb–Aug 2021, Argentina
Oxford–AstraZeneca; Pfizer–BioNTech	Oxford–AstraZeneca; Pfizer–BioNTech; Moderna; Novavax	Days 0 and 56–84	Phase II (1,050); Mar 2021 – Sep 2022, United Kingdom
Convidecia	ZF2001	Days 0 and 28; Days 0 and 56	Phase IV (120); Apr–Dec 2021, China
Oxford–AstraZeneca	Pfizer–BioNTech	Days 0 and 28	Phase II (676); Apr 2021 – Apr 2022, Spain
Oxford–AstraZeneca; Pfizer–BioNTech; Moderna	Pfizer–BioNTech; Moderna	Days 0 and 28; Days 0 and 112	Phase II (1,200); May 2021 – Mar 2023, Canada
Pfizer–BioNTech; Moderna	Pfizer–BioNTech; Moderna	Days 0 and 42	Phase II (400); May 2021 – Jan 2022, France
Oxford–AstraZeneca	Pfizer–BioNTech	Days 0 and 28; Days 0 and 21–49	Phase II (3,000); May–Dec 2021, Austria
Janssen	Pfizer–BioNTech; Janssen; Moderna	Days 0 and 84	Phase II (432); Jun 2021 – Sep 2022, Netherlands

Heterologous booster dose regimes in clinical trial
Initial course	Booster dose	Interval	Current phase (participants), periods and locations
CoronaVac (2 doses)	CoronaVac; Pfizer–BioNTech; Oxford–AstraZeneca	19 weeks or more	Phase IV (2,017,878); Aug–Nov 2021, Chile

== Efficacy ==
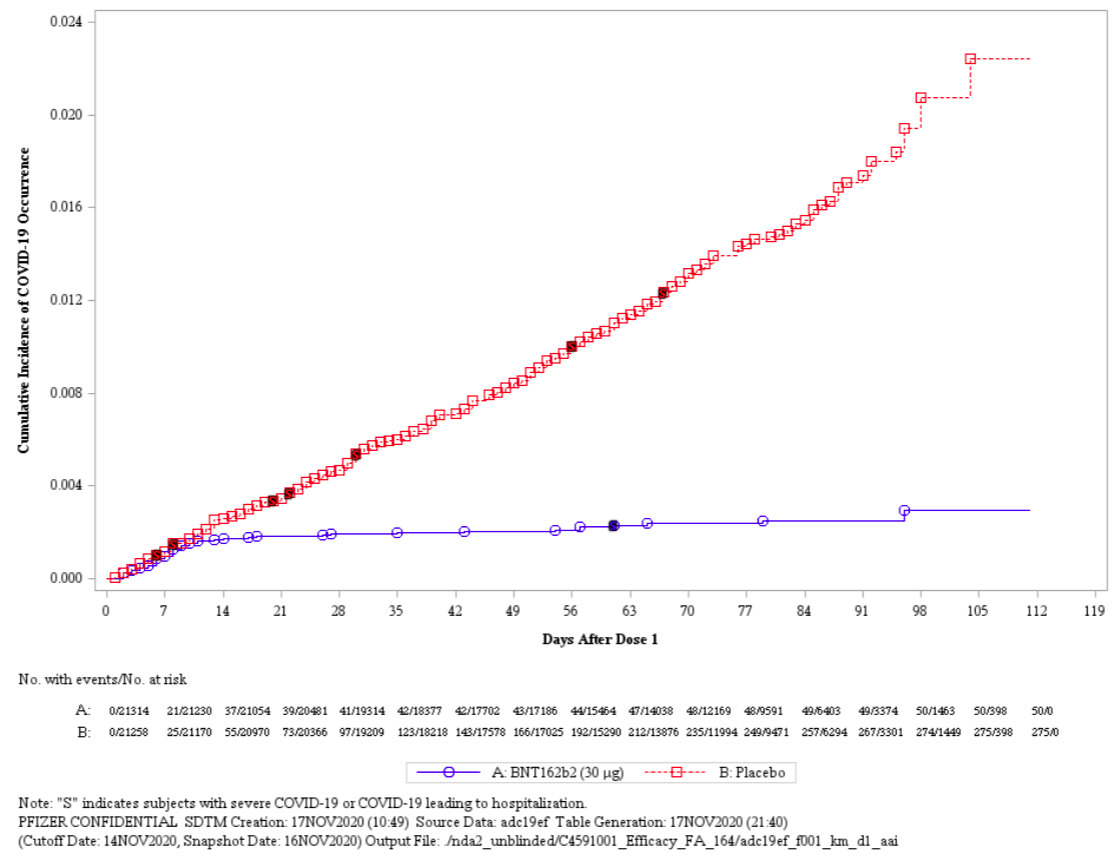
Cumulative incidence curves for symptomatic COVID-19 infections after the first dose of the Pfizer–BioNTech vaccine (tozinameran) or placebo in a double-blind clinical trial (red: placebo; blue: tozinameran)

Vaccine efficacy is the reduction in risk of getting the disease by vaccinated participants in a controlled trial compared with the risk of getting the disease by unvaccinated participants. An efficacy of 0% means that the vaccine does not work (identical to a placebo). An efficacy of 50% means that there are half as many cases of infection as in unvaccinated individuals.

COVID-19 vaccine efficacy may be adversely affected if the arm is held improperly or squeezed so the vaccine is injected subcutaneously instead of into the muscle. The CDC guidance is to not repeat doses that are administered subcutaneously.

It is not straightforward to compare the efficacies of the different vaccines because the trials were run with different populations, geographies, and variants of the virus. In the case of COVID-19 prior to the advent of the delta variant, it was thought that a vaccine efficacy of 67% may be enough to slow the pandemic, but the current vaccines do not confer sterilizing immunity, which is necessary to prevent transmission. Vaccine efficacy reflects disease prevention, a poor indicator of transmissibility of SARS‑CoV‑2 since asymptomatic people can be highly infectious. The US Food and Drug Administration (FDA) and the European Medicines Agency (EMA) set a cutoff of 50% as the efficacy required to approve a COVID-19 vaccine, with the lower limit of the 95% confidence interval being greater than 30%. Aiming for a realistic population vaccination coverage rate of 75%, and depending on the actual basic reproduction number, the necessary effectiveness of a COVID-19 vaccine is expected to need to be at least 70% to prevent an epidemic and at least 80% to extinguish it without further measures, such as social distancing.

The observed substantial efficacy of certain mRNA vaccines even after partial (1-dose) immunization indicates a non-linear dose-efficacy relation already seen in the phase I-II study. It suggests that personalization of the vaccine dose (regular dose to the elderly, reduced dose to the healthy young, additional booster dose to the immunosuppressed) might allow accelerating vaccination campaigns in settings of limited supplies, thereby shortening the pandemic, as predicted by pandemic modeling.

Ranges below are 95% confidence intervals unless indicated otherwise, and all values are for all participants regardless of age, according to the references for each of the trials. By definition, the accuracy of the estimates without an associated confidence interval is unknown publicly. Efficacy against severe COVID-19 is the most important, since hospitalizations and deaths are a public health burden whose prevention is a priority. Authorized and approved vaccines have shown the following efficacies:

COVID-19 vaccine efficacy

Vaccine	Efficacy by severity of COVID-19			Trial location	Refs
Vaccine	Mild or moderate (Note: Mild symptoms: fever, dry cough, fatigue, myalgia, arthralgia, sore throat, diarrhea, nausea, vomiting, headache, anosmia, ageusia, nasal congestion, rhinorrhea, conjunctivitis, skin rash, chills, dizziness. Moderate symptoms: mild pneumonia.)	Severe without hospitalization or death (Note: Severe symptoms without hospitalization or death for an individual, are any one of the following severe respiratory symptoms measured at rest on any time during the course of observation (on top of having either pneumonia, deep vein thrombosis, dyspnea, hypoxia, persistent chest pain, anorexia, confusion, fever above 38 °C (100 °F)), that however were not persistent/severe enough to cause hospitalization or death: Any respiratory rate ≥30 breaths/minute, heart rate ≥125 beats/minute, oxygen saturation (SpO2) ≤93% on room air at sea level, or partial pressure of oxygen/fraction of inspired oxygen (PaO2/FiO2) <300 mmHg.)	Severe with hospitalization or death (Note: Severe symptoms causing hospitalization or death, are those requiring treatment at hospitals or results in deaths: dyspnea, hypoxia, persistent chest pain, anorexia, confusion, fever above 38 °C (100 °F), respiratory failure, kidney failure, multiorgan dysfunction, sepsis, shock.)	Trial location	Refs
Oxford–AstraZeneca	81% (60–91%) (Note: With twelve weeks or more between doses. For an interval of less than six weeks, the trial found an efficacy 55% (33–70%).)	100% (97.5% CI, 72–100%)	100% (Note: A confidence interval was not provided, so it is not possible to know the accuracy of this measurement.)	Multinational	
Oxford–AstraZeneca	74% (68–82%) (Note: With a four-week interval between doses. Efficacy is "at preventing symptomatic COVID-19".)	100%	100%	United States	
Pfizer–BioNTech	95% (90–98%) (Note: COVID-19 symptoms observed in the Pfizer–BioNTech vaccine trials, were only counted as such for vaccinated individuals if they began more than seven days after their second dose, and required presence of a positive RT-PCR test result. Mild/moderate cases required at least one of the following symptoms and a positive test during, or within 4 days before or after, the symptomatic period: fever; new or increased cough; new or increased shortness of breath; chills; new or increased muscle pain; new loss of taste or smell; sore throat; diarrhoea; or vomiting. Severe cases additionally required at least one of the following symptoms: clinical signs at rest indicative of severe systemic illness (RR ≥30 breaths per minute, HR ≥125 beats per minute, SpO2 ≤93% on room air at sea level, or PaO2/FiO2<300mm Hg); respiratory failure (defined as needing high-flow oxygen, non-invasive ventilation, mechanical ventilation, or ECMO); evidence of shock (SBP <90 mm Hg, DBP <60 mm Hg, or requiring vasopressors); significant acute renal, hepatic, or neurologic dysfunction; admission to an ICU; death.)	66% (−125 to 96%) (Note: This measurement is not accurate enough to support the high efficacy because the lower limit of the 95% confidence interval is lower than the minimum of 30%.)		Multinational	
Pfizer–BioNTech	95% (90–98%)	Not reported	Not reported	United States	
Janssen	66% (55–75%) (Note: Moderate cases.) (Note: Efficacy reported 28 days post-vaccination for the Janssen single shot vaccine. A lower efficacy was found for the vaccinated individuals 14 days post-vaccination.)	85% (54–97%)	100% (Note: No hospitalizations or deaths were detected 28 days post-vaccination for 19,630 vaccinated individuals in the trials, compared with 16 hospitalizations reported in the placebo group of 19,691 individuals (incidence rate 5.2 per 1000 person-years) and seven COVID-19 related deaths for the same placebo group.)	Multinational	
Janssen	72% (58–82%)	86% (−9 to 100%)	100%	United States	
Janssen	68% (49–81%)	88% (8–100%)	100%	Brazil	
Janssen	64% (41–79%)	82% (46–95%)	100%	South Africa	
Moderna	94% (89–97%) (Note: Mild/Moderate COVID-19 symptoms observed in the Moderna vaccine trials, were only counted as such for vaccinated individuals if they began more than 14 days after their second dose, and required presence of a positive RT-PCR test result along with at least two systemic symptoms (fever above 38ºC, chills, myalgia, headache, sore throat, new olfactory and taste disorder) or just one respiratory symptom (cough, shortness of breath or difficulty breathing, or clinical or radiographical evidence of pneumonia).)	100% (Note: Severe COVID-19 symptoms observed in the Moderna vaccine trials, were defined as symptoms having met the criteria for mild/moderate symptoms plus any of the following observations: Clinical signs indicative of severe systemic illness, respiratory rate ≥30 per minute, heart rate ≥125 beats per minute, SpO2 ≤93% on room air at sea level or PaO2/FIO2 <300 mm Hg; or respiratory failure or ARDS, (defined as needing high-flow oxygen, non-invasive or mechanical ventilation, or ECMO), evidence of shock (systolic blood pressure <90 mmHg, diastolic BP <60 mmHg or requiring vasopressors); or significant acute renal, hepatic, or neurologic dysfunction; or admission to an intensive care unit or death. No severe cases were detected for vaccinated individuals in the trials, compared with thirty in the placebo group (incidence rate 9.1 per 1000 person-years).)	100%	United States	
Sinopharm BIBP	78% (65–86%)	100%	100%	Multinational	
Sinopharm BIBP	79% (66–88%)	Not reported	79% (26–94%)	Multinational	
Sputnik V	92% (86–95%)	100% (94–100%)	100%	Russia	
CoronaVac	51% (36–62%) (Note: These Phase III data have not been published or peer reviewed.)	84% (58–94%)	100% (56–100%)	Brazil	
CoronaVac	84% (65–92%)	100%	100% (20–100%)	Turkey	
Covaxin	78% (65–86%)	93% (57–100%)		India	
Sputnik Light	79%	Not reported	Not reported	Russia	
Convidecia	66%	91%	Not reported	Multinational	
Sinopharm WIBP	73% (58–82%)	100% (Note: No cases detected in trial.)	100%	Multinational	
Abdala	92% (86–96%)	Not reported	Not reported	Cuba	
Soberana 02	71% (59–79%)	63%	Not reported	Cuba	
Soberana 02	67% (59–79%)	97%	95%	Iran	
Soberana 02 and Soberana Plus	92% (87–96%)	100%	Not reported	Cuba	
Novavax	90% (75–95%)	100%	100%	United Kingdom	
Novavax	60% (20–80%)	100%	100%	South Africa	
Novavax	90% (83–95%)	Not reported	Not reported	United States	
Novavax	Not reported	Not reported	Mexico		
CureVac	48%	Not reported	Not reported	Multinational	
ZyCoV-D	67%	Not reported	Not reported	India	
EpiVacCorona	79%	Not reported	Not reported	Russia	
ZF2001	82%	Not reported	Not reported	Multinational	
SCB-2019	67% (54–77%)	Not reported	Not reported	Multinational	
CoVLP	71% (59–80%)	Not reported	Not reported	Multinational	
Sanofi–GSK COVID-19 vaccine	58% (27–77%)	Not reported	Not reported	Multinational	

=== Effectiveness ===
Death rates for unvaccinated Americans substantially exceed those who were vaccinated, with bivalent boosters further reducing the death rate.

Evidence from vaccine use during the pandemic shows vaccination can reduce infection and is most effective at preventing severe COVID-19 symptoms and death, but is less good at preventing mild COVID-19. Efficacy wanes over time but can be maintained with boosters. In 2021, the CDC reported that unvaccinated people were 10 times more likely to be hospitalized and 11 times more likely to die than fully vaccinated people.

The CDC reported that vaccine effectiveness fell from 91% against Alpha to 66% against Delta. One expert stated that "those who are infected following vaccination are still not getting sick and not dying like was happening before vaccination." By late August 2021, the Delta variant accounted for 99 percent of U.S. cases and was found to double the risk of severe illness and hospitalization for those not yet vaccinated.

On 10 December 2021, the UK Health Security Agency reported that early data indicated a 20- to 40-fold reduction in neutralizing activity for Omicron by sera from Pfizer 2-dose vaccinees relative to earlier strains. After a booster dose (usually with an mRNA vaccine), vaccine effectiveness against symptomatic disease was at 70%–75%, and the effectiveness against severe disease was expected to be higher.

A meta-analysis looking into COVID-19 vaccine differences in immunosuppressed individuals found that people with a weakened immune system are less able to produce neutralizing antibodies. For example, organ transplant recipients need three vaccines to achieve seroconversion. A study on the serologic response to mRNA vaccines among patients with lymphoma, leukemia, and myeloma found that one-quarter of patients did not produce measurable antibodies, varying by cancer type.

In February 2023, a systematic review in The Lancet said that the protection afforded by infection was comparable to that from vaccination, albeit with an increased risk of severe illness and death from the disease of an initial infection.

A January 2024 study by the CDC found that staying up to date on the vaccines could reduce the risk of strokes, blood clots and heart attacks related to COVID-19 in people aged 65 years or older or with a condition that makes them more vulnerable to said conditions.

==== Against severe illness and death ====
Overall, vaccines had a 87%–90% protection against severe outcomes, such as hospitalisation. Six months after vaccination, the protection was still 76%. Like with infections, the protection was stronger against pre-Omicron variants than Omicron. Protection against dying from COVID was similar: around 86%.

According to a June 2022 study, COVID‑19 vaccines prevented an additional 14.4 to 19.8 million deaths in 185 countries and territories from 8 December 2020 to 8 December 2021. A 2024 study estimated around 1.6 million lives saves in the wider European region. A study published in 2025 estimated that COVID-19 vaccinations globally averted approximately 2.5 million deaths between 2020 and 2024, with the majority of the benefit concentrated among older adults. These estimates were more conservative than those reported in previous studies, using different estimates of vaccine effectiveness and mortality rates.

==== Studies ====
Real-world studies of vaccine effectiveness measure the extent to which a certain vaccine prevents infection, symptoms, hospitalization and death for the vaccinated individuals in a large population under routine conditions.

- In Israel, among the 715,425 individuals vaccinated by the mRNA vaccines from 20 December 2020, to 28 January 2021, starting seven days after the second shot, only 317 people (0.04%) displayed mild/moderate COVID-19 symptoms and only 16 people (0.002%) were hospitalized.
- CDC reported that under real-world conditions, mRNA vaccine effectiveness was 90% against infections regardless of symptom status; while effectiveness of partial immunization was 80%.
- In the UK, 15,121 health care workers from 104 hospitals who had tested negative for antibodies prior to the study, were followed by RT-PCR tests twice a week from 7 December 2020 to 5 February 2021, a study compared the positive results for the 90.7% vaccinated share of their cohort with the 9.3% unvaccinated share, and found that the Pfizer-BioNTech vaccine reduced all infections (including asymptomatic), by 72% (58–86%) three weeks after the first dose and 86% (76–97%) one week after the second dose, while Alpha was dominant.
- In Israel a study conducted from 17 January to 6 March 2021, found that Pfizer/BioNTech reduced asymptomatic Alpha infections by 94% and symptomatic COVID-19 infections by 97%.
- A study on the Queensland Population having only ever been exposed to the Omicron strain of COVID-19 found vaccine effectiveness against symptomatic hospitalizations to be 70% in the general population and similar for First Nations peoples.
- A study among pre-surgical patients across the Mayo Clinic system in the United States, showed that mRNA vaccines were 80% protective against asymptomatic infections.
- A UK study found that a single dose of the Oxford–AstraZeneca COVID-19 vaccine is about 73% (27–90%) effective in people aged 70 and older.
- A study finds that nearly all teenagers admitted to intensive care units because of COVID-19 were unvaccinated.

==== Pregnancy and fertility ====
Studies have not observed a correlation between COVID vaccination and fertility.

A UK study found COVID vaccination is safe for pregnant women and is associated with a 15% decrease in the odds of stillbirth. Vaccination is recommended for pregnant women because pregnancy increases the risk of severe COVID. Researchers at St George's, University of London, and the Royal College of Obstetricians and Gynaecologists investigated 23 published studies and trials involving 117,552 vaccinated pregnant women. There was no increased risk of complications during pregnancy. Almost all pregnant women admitted to UK hospitals with COVID were unvaccinated.

A US study of 46,079 pregnancies concluded that COVID vaccination is safe and does not raise the risk of preterm birth or small size babies.

Vaccine	Initial effectiveness by severity of COVID-19				Study location	Refs
Vaccine	Asymptomatic	Symptomatic	Hospitalization	Death	Study location	Refs
Oxford–AstraZeneca	70% (69–71%)	Not reported	87% (85–88%)	90% (88–92%)	Brazil	
Oxford–AstraZeneca	Not reported	89% (78–94%) (Note: Data collected while the Alpha variant was already dominant.)	Not reported	Not reported	England	
Oxford–AstraZeneca	Not reported	Not reported	Not reported	89% (Note: A confidence interval was not provided, so it is not possible to know the accuracy of this measurement.)	Argentina	
Oxford–AstraZeneca	72% (69–74%)	Not reported	Not reported	88% (79–94%)	Hungary	
Pfizer–BioNTech	92% (91–92%)	97% (97–97%)	98% (97–98%)	97% (96–97%)	Israel	
Pfizer–BioNTech	92% (88–95%)	94% (87–98%)	87% (55–100%)	97%	Israel	
Pfizer–BioNTech	83% (83–84%)	Not reported	Not reported	91% (89–92%)	Hungary	
Pfizer–BioNTech	Not reported	78% (77–79%)	98% (96–99%)	96% (95–97%)	Uruguay	
Pfizer–BioNTech	85% (74–96%)		Not reported	Not reported	England	
Pfizer–BioNTech	90% (68–97%)		Not reported	100% (Note: No cases detected in study.)	United States	
Moderna	89% (87–90%)	Not reported	Not reported	94% (91–96%)	Hungary	
Moderna	90% (68–97%)		Not reported	100%	United States	
Sinopharm BIBP	Not reported	Not reported	Not reported	84%	Argentina	
Sinopharm BIBP	69% (67–70%)	Not reported	Not reported	88% (86–89%)	Hungary	
Sinopharm BIBP	50% (49–52%)	Not reported	Not reported	94% (91–96%)	Peru	
Sputnik V	Not reported	98%	Not reported	Not reported	Russia	
Sputnik V	Not reported	98%	100%	100%	United Arab Emirates	
Sputnik V	Not reported	Not reported	Not reported	93%	Argentina	
Sputnik V	86% (84–87%)	Not reported	Not reported	98% (96–99%)	Hungary	
CoronaVac	54% (53–55%)	Not reported	73% (72–74%)	74% (73–75%)	Brazil	
CoronaVac	Not reported	66% (65–67%)	88% (87–88%)	86% (85–88%)	Chile	
CoronaVac	Not reported	60% (59–61%)	91% (89–93%)	95% (93–96%)	Uruguay	
CoronaVac	Not reported	94%	96%	98%	Indonesia	
CoronaVac	Not reported	80%	86%	95%	Brazil	
Sputnik Light	79% (75–82%) (Note: Participants aged 60 to 79.)	Not reported	88% (80–92%)	85% (75–91%)	Argentina	

Initial course	Booster dose	Initial effectiveness by severity of COVID-19				Study location	Refs
Initial course	Booster dose	Asymptomatic	Symptomatic	Hospitalization	Death	Study location	Refs
CoronaVac	CoronaVac	Not reported	80% (Note: A confidence interval was not provided, so it is not possible to know the accuracy of this measurement.)	88%	Not reported	Chile	
CoronaVac	Pfizer–BioNTech	Not reported	90%	87%	Not reported	Chile	
CoronaVac	Oxford–AstraZeneca	Not reported	93%	96%	Not reported	Chile	

=== Variants ===
World Health Organization video describing how variants proliferate in unvaccinated areas

The interplay between the SARS-CoV-2 virus and its human hosts was initially natural but is now being altered by the prompt availability of vaccines. The potential emergence of a SARS-CoV-2 variant that is moderately or fully resistant to the antibody response elicited by the COVID-19 vaccines may necessitate modification of the vaccines. The emergence of vaccine-resistant variants is more likely in a highly vaccinated population with uncontrolled transmission. Trials indicate many vaccines developed for the initial strain have lower efficacy for some variants against symptomatic COVID-19. As of February 2021, the US Food and Drug Administration believed that all FDA authorized vaccines remained effective in protecting against circulating strains of SARS-CoV-2.

==== Alpha (lineage B.1.1.7) ====
Limited evidence from various preliminary studies reviewed by the WHO indicated retained efficacy/effectiveness against disease from Alpha with the Oxford–AstraZeneca vaccine, Pfizer–BioNTech and Novavax, with no data for other vaccines yet. Relevant to how vaccines can end the pandemic by preventing asymptomatic infection, they have also indicated retained antibody neutralization against Alpha with most of the widely distributed vaccines (Sputnik V, Pfizer–BioNTech, Moderna, CoronaVac, Sinopharm BIBP, Covaxin), minimal to moderate reduction with the Oxford–AstraZeneca, and no data for other vaccines yet.

In December 2020, a new SARS‑CoV‑2 variant, the Alpha variant or lineage B.1.1.7, was identified in the UK.

Early results suggest protection to the variant from the Pfizer-BioNTech and Moderna vaccines.

One study indicated that the Oxford–AstraZeneca COVID-19 vaccine had an efficacy of 42–89% against Alpha, versus 71–91% against other variants.

Preliminary data from a clinical trial indicates that the Novavax vaccine is ~96% effective for symptoms against the original variant and ~86% against Alpha.

==== Beta (lineage B.1.351) ====
Limited evidence from various preliminary studies reviewed by the WHO have indicated reduced efficacy/effectiveness against disease from Beta with the Oxford–AstraZeneca vaccine (possibly substantial), Novavax (moderate), Pfizer–BioNTech and Janssen (minimal), with no data for other vaccines yet. Relevant to how vaccines can end the pandemic by preventing asymptomatic infection, they have also indicated possibly reduced antibody neutralization against Beta with most of the widely distributed vaccines (Oxford–AstraZeneca, Sputnik V, Janssen, Pfizer–BioNTech, Moderna, Novavax; minimal to substantial reduction) except CoronaVac and Sinopharm BIBP (minimal to modest reduction), with no data for other vaccines yet.

Moderna has launched a trial of a vaccine to tackle the Beta variant or lineage B.1.351. On 17 February 2021, Pfizer announced neutralization activity was reduced by two-thirds for this variant, while stating that no claims about the efficacy of the vaccine in preventing illness for this variant could yet be made. Decreased neutralizing activity of sera from patients vaccinated with the Moderna and Pfizer-BioNTech vaccines against Beta was later confirmed by several studies. On 1 April 2021, an update on a Pfizer/BioNTech South African vaccine trial stated that the vaccine was 100% effective so far (i.e., vaccinated participants saw no cases), with six of nine infections in the placebo control group being the Beta variant.

In January 2021, Johnson & Johnson, which held trials for its Janssen vaccine in South Africa, reported the level of protection against moderate to severe COVID-19 infection was 72% in the United States and 57% in South Africa.

On 6 February 2021, the Financial Times reported that provisional trial data from a study undertaken by South Africa's University of the Witwatersrand in conjunction with Oxford University demonstrated reduced efficacy of the Oxford–AstraZeneca COVID-19 vaccine against the variant. The study found that in a sample size of 2,000 the AZD1222 vaccine afforded only "minimal protection" in all but the most severe cases of COVID-19. On 7 February 2021, the Minister for Health for South Africa suspended the planned deployment of about a million doses of the vaccine whilst they examine the data and await advice on how to proceed.

In a study reported in March and May 2021, the efficacy of the Novavax vaccine (NVX-CoV2373) was tested in a preliminary randomized, placebo-controlled study involving 2684 participants who were negative for COVID at baseline testing. Beta was the predominant variant to occur, with post-hoc analysis indicating a vaccine efficacy of Novavax against Beta of 51.0% for HIV-negative participants.

==== Gamma (lineage P.1) ====
Limited evidence from various preliminary studies published in 2021 reviewed by the WHO have indicated likely retained efficacy/effectiveness against disease from Gamma with CoronaVac and Sinopharm BIBP, with no data for other vaccines yet. Relevant to how vaccines can end the pandemic by preventing asymptomatic infection, they have also indicated retained antibody neutralization against Gamma with Oxford–AstraZeneca and CoronaVac (no to minimal reduction) and slightly reduced neutralization with Pfizer–BioNTech and Moderna (minimal to moderate reduction), with no data for other vaccines yet.

The Gamma variant or lineage P.1 variant (also known as 20J/501Y.V3), initially identified in Brazil, seems to partially escape vaccination with the Pfizer-BioNTech vaccine.

==== Delta (lineage B.1.617.2) ====
Limited evidence from various preliminary studies published in 2021 reviewed by the WHO have indicated likely retained efficacy/effectiveness against disease from Delta with the Oxford–AstraZeneca vaccine and Pfizer–BioNTech, with no data for other vaccines yet. Relevant to how vaccines can end the pandemic by preventing asymptomatic infection, they have also indicated reduced antibody neutralization against Delta with single-dose Oxford–AstraZeneca (substantial reduction), Pfizer–BioNTech and Covaxin (modest to moderate reduction), with no data for other vaccines yet.

In October 2020, a new variant was discovered in India, which was named lineage B.1.617. There were very few detections until January 2021, but by April it had spread to at least 20 countries in all continents except Antarctica and South America. Mutations present in the spike protein in the B.1.617 lineage are associated with reduced antibody neutralization in laboratory experiments. The variant has frequently been referred to as a 'Double mutant', even though in this respect it is not unusual. the latter two of which may cause it to easily avoid antibodies. In an update on 15 April 2021, PHE designated lineage B.1.617 as a 'Variant under investigation', VUI-21APR-01. On 6 May 2021, Public Health England escalated lineage B.1.617.2 from a Variant Under Investigation to a Variant of Concern based on an assessment of transmissibility being at least equivalent to the Alpha variant.

==== Omicron (lineage BA.2 and BA.2.12.2) ====
COVID-19 vaccine effectiveness was studied in adults without immunocompromising conditions in 10 US states between 18 December 2021 – 10 June 2022, when Omicron was prevalent. 3 doses of mRNA COVID-19 vaccines was 69% against COVID-19–associated hospitalization 7–119 days after the third vaccine dose and 52% against COVID-19–associated hospitalization more than 4 months after the 3rd dose. Among adults aged ≥50 years, COVID-19 vaccine effectiveness against COVID-19–associated hospitalization ≥120 days after receipt of dose 3 was only 32%, increasing to 66% ≥7 days after the fourth dose.

=== Effect of neutralizing antibodies ===
One study found that the in vitro concentration (titer) of neutralizing antibodies elicited by a COVID-19 vaccine is a strong correlate of immune protection. The relationship between protection and neutralizing activity is nonlinear. A neutralization as low as 3% (95% CI, 1–13%) of the level of convalescence results in 50% efficacy against severe disease, with 20% (14–28%) resulting in 50% efficacy against detectable infection. Protection against infection quickly decays, leaving individuals susceptible to mild infections, while protection against severe disease is largely retained and much more durable. The observed half-life of neutralizing titers was 65 days for mRNA vaccines (Pfizer–BioNTech, Moderna) during the first 4 months, increasing to 108 days over 8 months. Greater initial efficacy against infection likely results in a higher level of protection against serious disease in the long term (beyond 10 years, as seen in other vaccines such as smallpox, measles, mumps, and rubella), although the authors acknowledge that their simulations consider only protection from neutralizing antibodies and ignore other immune protection mechanisms, such as cell-mediated immunity, which may be more durable. This observation also applies to efficacy against variants and is particularly significant for vaccines with a lower initial efficacy; for example, a 5-fold reduction in neutralization would indicate a reduction in initial efficacy from 95% to 77% against a specific variant, and from a lower efficacy of 70% to 32% against that variant. For the Oxford–AstraZeneca vaccine, the observed efficacy is below the predicted 95% confidence interval. It is higher for Sputnik V and the convalescent response, and is within the predicted interval for the other vaccines evaluated (Pfizer–BioNTech, Moderna, Janssen, CoronaVac, Covaxin, Novavax).

=== Drug interactions ===
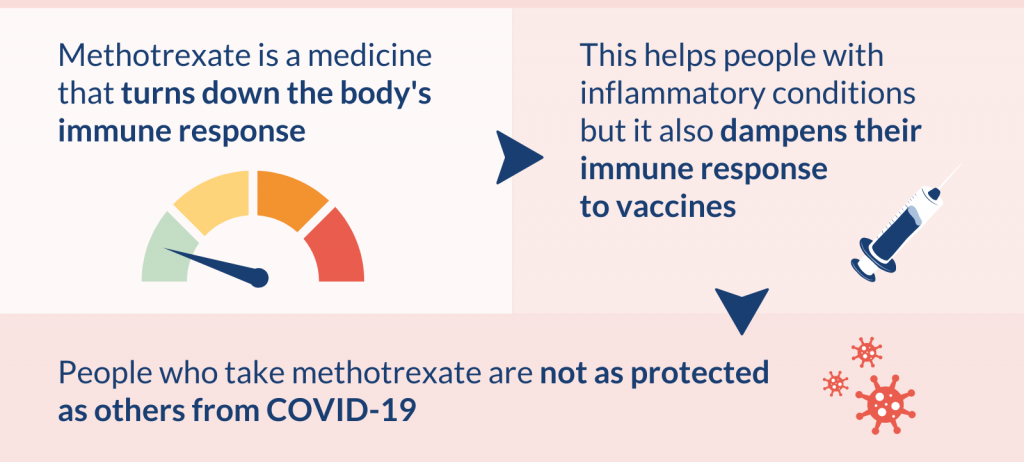
Methotrexate might reduce the effectiveness of COVID-19 vaccines.

Methotrexate reduces the immune response to COVID-19 vaccines, making them less effective. Pausing methotrexate for two weeks following COVID-19 vaccination may result in improved immunity. Not taking the medicine for two weeks might result in a minor increase of inflammatory disease flares in some people.

== Side effects ==
All vaccines, including COVID-19 ones, can have minor side effects related to the mild trauma associated with the introduction of a foreign substance into the body. These include soreness, redness, rash, and inflammation at the injection site. Other common side effects include fatigue, headache, myalgia (muscle pain), and arthralgia (joint pain) which generally resolve within a few days.

Serious adverse events that follow the administration of vaccines are of high interest to the public. It is important to recognize that the occurrence of an adverse event following vaccination does not necessarily mean that the vaccine caused the adverse event; the health problem may have been unrelated. Reporting of all adverse events, careful followup and statistical analysis of occurrences are required to determine whether or not a specific health problem is more likely to occur after a vaccine is administered.

More serious side effects are very rare. Before COVID-19 vaccines such as Moderna and Pfizer/BioNTech were authorized for use in the general population, they had to pass phase III studies involving tens of thousands of people. Any serious side effects that did not appear during that testing are likely to occur less often than ~1 in 10,000 cases. It is important that Phase III trials be diverse, to ensure that safety results apply broadly. It is possible that side effects may affect a population that was not adequately represented during the initial testing. Pregnant women, immunocompromised people, and children are usually excluded from initial studies because they may be at higher risk. Further studies may be done to ensure their safety before vaccines are authorized for use in such populations. Subsequent examinations of the use of COVID vaccines in pregnant people and in children have shown similar outcomes to the general population and do not suggest greater risk for these groups.
