= Covivac =

CoviVac may refer to:

== Vaccine ==
- CoviVac (Russia COVID-19 vaccine), inactivated COVID-19 vaccine developed by the Chumakov Centre in Russia (Russian: КовиВак)
- Covivac (Vietnam COVID-19 vaccine), viral vector COVID-19 vaccine developed by Institute of Vaccines and Medical Biologicals in Vietnam, later named NDV-HXP-S
- COVI-VAC (U.S. COVID-19 vaccine), codenamed CDX-005; live-attenuated COVID-19 vaccine developed by Codagenix Inc.; produced at the Serum Institute of India

== See also ==
- COVID-19 vaccine
- Covi (disambiguation)
- VAC (disambiguation)
