= PTX =

PTX may refer to:

== Places ==
- Plano, Texas, a city in the United States
- Contador Airport (IATA airport code: PTX, ICAO airport code: SKPI) Pitalito, Huila, Colombia.
- Putian West railway station (rail code: PTX) Guancheng Hui, Zhengzhou, Henan, China

== Biology and medicine ==
- Pentraxin, a protein domain and family
- Paclitaxel, an anticancer drug
- Pertussis toxin, an inhibitor of G-protein coupled receptors
- Palytoxin, an extremely poisonous vasoconstrictor
- Picrotoxin, a poisonous crystalline plant alkaloid
- Pumiliotoxin, found in dart frogs
- Pneumothorax, a medical condition also sometimes called "collapsed lung"

== Computing ==
- Parallel Thread Execution, an intermediary assembler language by NVIDIA
- ptx (Unix), a Unix command-line utility producing a permuted index
- .ptx, RAW image format for Pentax cameras
- .ptx, the file extension for the session project file for Pro Tools 10 and later

== Other uses ==
- PTX, a series of military explosives from WWII, see List of explosives used during World War II
- PTX, a series of fictional robots in the video game 2nd Super Robot Wars Original Generation
- Pentatonix, an American a cappella group
  - PTX (album), a 2014 album by Pentatonix
- Prescient Therapeutics (stock ticker: PTX) drug company
- Pillowtex Corporation (stock ticker: PTX) bedware company

== See also ==
- Providence Therapeutics (product code prefix: PTX) a biotechnology company
