= 202-CoV =

Vaccine candidate against COVID-19

Vaccine description
- Target: SARS-CoV-2
- Vaccine type: Protein subunit

Clinical data
- Routes of administration: Intramuscular

Identifiers
- CAS Number: 2699024-52-5

202-CoV is a COVID-19 vaccine candidate developed by Shanghai Zerun Biotechnology Co., Ltd., Walvax Biotech. It is one of several candidates under development by Walvax.

== Development ==
In May 2020, the Bill & Melinda Gates Foundation awarded Shanghai Zerun Biotechnology a $1,000,000 USD vaccine development grant to "support research and development for COVID-19 response".

In July 2021, the Coalition for Epidemic Preparedness Innovations (CEPI) announced that it had partnered with Shanghai Zerun Biotechnology and its parent company, Walvax Biotech, to develop COVID-19 vaccine candidates against both the original strain of SARS-CoV-2 and its newer variants. As of October 2022, CEPI had provided up to $25.1 million USD towards 202-CoV, but had ceased further funding. The chimeric protein candidate remains in Phase I clinical trials.
