= SCB-2019 =

Vaccine candidate against COVID-19

Vaccine description
- Target: SARS-CoV-2
- Vaccine type: Protein subunit

Clinical data
- Routes of administration: Intramuscular

Identifiers
- CAS Number: 2541906-99-2
- DrugBank: DB15805

SCB-2019 is a protein subunit COVID-19 vaccine developed by Clover Biopharmaceuticals using an adjuvant from Dynavax technologies. Positive results of Phase I trials for the vaccine were published in The Lancet and the vaccine completed enrollment of 29,000 participants in Phase II/III trials in July 2021. In September 2021, SCB-2019 announced Phase III results showing 67% efficacy against all cases of COVID-19 and 79% efficacy against all cases of the Delta variant. Additionally, the vaccine was 84% effective against moderate cases and 100% effective against hospitalization.

SCB-2019 is being funded by CEPI as part of COVAX and has received advanced purchase orders from GAVI for 400 million doses, with production to begin in 2021.

== Medical uses ==
The vaccine was administered in 2 doses in 4 weeks.

=== Efficacy ===
In September 2021, SCB-2019 announced Phase III results showing 67.2% efficacy against all cases of COVID-19 of any degree of severity, 83.7% efficacy against moderate-to-severe disease, and 100% against hospitalisation and severe cases. Additionally, the vaccine was 79% effective against all cases of Delta. Of the 207 cases found during the trials, 52 were from the vaccinated group and 155 from the placebo group. These Phase II/III results have been published in the Lancet.

Clover expects to submit its Phase III results for approval by the World Health Organization, European Medicines Agency, and China's NMPA in the fourth quarter of 2021.

==== Efficacy against variants ====
In Phase III trials, SCB-2019 showed efficacy of 81.7% for moderate-to-severe cases of COVID-19 caused by Delta, 91.8% for Gamma, and 58.6% for Mu. 56 Delta cases, 37 Mu cases, and 13 Gamma cases were recorded during the trials.

== Pharmacology ==
Subunit vaccines contain parts of the virus selected to stimulate an immune response, without including the entire virus. Because the fragments are incapable of causing disease, subunit vaccines are considered very safe. Subunit vaccines in widespread use include the Hepatitis B vaccine and Pertussis vaccine.

SCB-2019 has a trimeric form of the SARS-CoV-2 spike protein (S-Trimer) combined with one of two different adjuvants AS03 (GlaxoSmithKline) or CpG/Alum (Dynavax). The vaccine displays the spike protein in its natural three-part form, leading to a potentially better immune response. The vaccine is similar to other subunit COVID-19 vaccines including Novavax, Abdala, and ZF2001.

The vaccine is stable for at least six months under normal refrigeration conditions and at least one month at 40 degrees Celsius.

== Manufacturing ==
=== CEPI and COVAX investment ===
SCB-2019 is funded by CEPI as part of the COVAX. By November 2020, CEPI had invested $328 million to develop the vaccine. If the vaccine was successful, CEPI's investment would help scale-up production to over 1 billion doses a year. Previously, CEPI provided $3.5 million to support Phase I trials and later an additional $66 million in July 2020 to expand clinical testing and prepare sites for Phase II/III trials.

In February 2021, Clover decided to proceed with the adjuvant from Dynavax for its Phase II/III trials over GlaxoSmithKline after evaluating manufacturing considerations. Separately, CEPI provided $99 million funding to Dynavax to produce its adjuvant for various COVID-19 vaccines.

Vaccine production is expected to begin in 2021.

=== Orders ===
In June 2020, GAVI announced an agreement with Clover for the purchase of 64 million doses in 2021 and an additional 350 million doses in 2022.

== Clinical trials ==
=== Phase I & II trials ===
In June 2020, Phase I trial were launched to assess safety, reactogenicity, and immunogenicity at multiple dose levels with 151 participants in Perth, Australia using 2 separate adjuvants, AS03 and CpG/Alum. In results published in The Lancet, SCB-2019 resulted in a strong immune responses against COVID-19, with high viral neutralizing activity (antibody geometric mean titres were 1567–4452 with AS03 and 174–2440 with CpG/Alum). Both adjuvanted vaccines were well tolerated and determined to be suitable for further clinical development.

In August 2021, a Phase II trial will launch to assess immunogenicity and safety with 800 participants in China.

=== Phase II/III trials ===
In March 2021, a larger combined-Phase II/III trial was launched to evaluate efficacy, immunogenicity, reactogenicity, and safety of the CpG/Alum adjuvated SCB-2019 vaccine. In July 2021, enrollment in the Phase II/III trials was completed with 45% of the 29,000 participants in Asia, 45% in Latin America and the rest in Europe and Africa.

=== Efficacy against variants ===
In September 2021, results published in The Journal of Infectious Diseases showed SCB-2019 induced antibodies responses up to 184 days in the Phase I trial. Additionally, the vaccine produced neutralizing antibodies against three of the most common variants of concern; Alpha, Beta, and Gamma.

In September 2021, the COVID-19 vaccine candidate showed 79% efficacy against the delta variant in its Phase II/III trials.
