= Vaxart COVID-19 vaccine =

Vaccine candidate against COVID-19

Vaccine description
- Target: SARS-CoV-2
- Vaccine type: Viral vector

Clinical data
- Other names: VXA-CoV2-1, VXA-CoV2-1.1-S, VXA-CoV2-3.1
- Routes of administration: Oral

Identifiers
- CAS Number: 2543668-36-4

Vaxart COVID-19 vaccine is a COVID-19 vaccine candidate developed by Vaxart. It is an enteric-coated tablet vaccine that can be administered orally.
