= Sanofi–Translate Bio COVID-19 vaccine =

Vaccine candidate against COVID-19

Vaccine description
- Target: SARS-CoV-2
- Vaccine type: mRNA

Clinical data
- Other names: MRT5500, VAW00001
- Routes of administration: Intramuscular

Legal status
- Legal status: Terminated

Identifiers
- CAS Number: 2541853-30-7

The Sanofi–Translate Bio COVID-19 vaccine, also known as MRT5500 or VAW00001, was a COVID-19 vaccine candidate developed by Sanofi Pasteur and Translate Bio. The development was stopped in September 2021.

== History ==
In June 2020, Sanofi, after lagging behind its competitors, "accelerated" the development of the vaccine via the smaller biotech firm Translate Bio, with a US$425 million partnership.

Development of the vaccine halted in September 2021, with Sanofi citing the difficulty of running placebo-controlled studies with other mRNA vaccines (such as Pfizer's and Moderna's) already on the market. Despite this, the company reported "promising results" in its initial trials.Sanofi has continued testing its recombinant protein vaccine, developed collaboratively with GlaxoSmithKline, to serve as a booster dose for other COVID-19 vaccines.
