= V-01 =

Vaccine candidate against COVID-19

Vaccine description
- Target: SARS-CoV-2
- Vaccine type: Protein subunit

Clinical data
- Routes of administration: Intramuscular

V-01 is a protein subunit COVID-19 vaccine candidate developed by a subsidiary of Livzon Pharmaceutical Group Inc.

== Preclinical studies ==
A preclinical study in rhesus macaques was published in July 2021. The vaccine's ability to neutralize several variants of concern has also been tested in mice. Another study in mice tested V-01 as a booster after inactivated Covid vaccine, including neutralization of a range of variants of concern.

== Clinical studies ==
A phase I clinical trial to assess the safety and immune response was initiated in February 2021. It concluded that the vaccine was well-tolerated. A phase II trial with 880 participants concluded that the vaccine was immunogenic and well-tolerated. A second phase II trial tested V-01 and a bivalent version targeting Beta and Delta variants of concern as a booster after primary vaccination with inactivated vaccine.

A phase III trial using V-01 as a booster was undertaken during an Omicron wave with 10,218 participants in Malaysia and Pakistan to determine efficacy and safety. Participants had been previously vaccinated with two doses of inactivated vaccine, and were randomised to either V-01 or placebo as a booster.
