= Stemirna COVID-19 vaccine =

Vaccine candidate against COVID-19

Vaccine description
- Target: SARS-CoV-2
- Vaccine type: mRNA

Clinical data
- Other names: SW 0123
- Routes of administration: Intramuscular

Identifiers
- CAS Number: 2699076-70-3

Stemirna COVID-19 vaccine is a COVID-19 vaccine candidate developed by Stemirna Therapeutics. The Stemirna COVID-19 vaccine is labeled as a mRNA vaccine which means it causes the body to make a protein specific to the vaccine which triggers an immune response from the body. Stemirna first started the production of vaccines in result of the COVID-19 pandemic, therefore the first vaccine they began producing was a COVID-19 vaccine.

== Research ==
Testing on mice and other non human primates, the vaccine showed results that would lead the body to produce antibodies that would stop the spread and limit the coronavirus therefore the vaccine seemed very promising for human trials. Stemirna explains that the research in Nanotechnology has been a big help into researching and create possible vaccines for the COVID-19 virus.

== History ==
Stemirna Therapeutics raised a total of 1.2 Billion RMB (Renminbi) which translates to a little less than 200 million US Dollars for the start of their production and testing trials. Li Hangwen, a co-founder of the company, stated they were confident in the vaccine's efficacy and safety based on ongoing Phase 1 and Phase 2 trial data conducted in Laos. Stemirna Therapeutics first began their clinical trials in Brazil as part of its Phase 3 testing. Li Hangwen, who is the chief executive of the company said that they were going to be able to produce 400 million doses of the vaccine each year. The Stemirna vaccine uses nanotechnology which has helped to quickly create diagnostic tools, vaccines, and antiviral treatments for SARS-CoV-2.
