= Minigene =

A minigene is a minimal gene fragment that includes an exon and the control regions necessary for the gene to express itself in the same way as a wild type gene fragment. This is a minigene in its most basic sense. More complex minigenes can be constructed containing multiple exons and intron(s). Minigenes provide a valuable tool for researchers evaluating splicing patterns both in vivo and in vitro biochemically assessed experiments. Specifically, minigenes are used as splice reporter vectors (also called exon-trapping vectors) and act as a probe to determine which factors are important in splicing outcomes. They can be constructed to test the way both cis-regulatory elements (RNA effects) and trans-regulatory elements (associated proteins/splicing factors) affect gene expression.

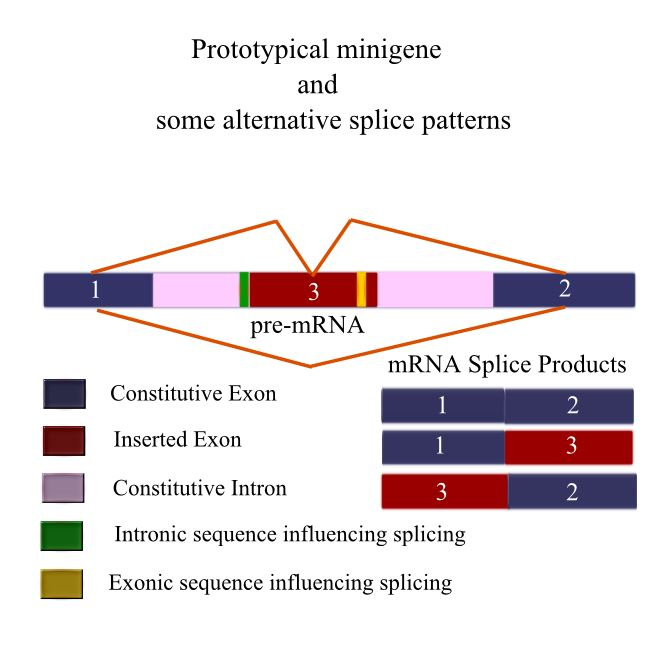
pre-mRNA splice patterns showing constitutive exons and introns and the inserted fragment. Orange lines show alternative splicing outcomes as dictated by the exonic sequences and intronic sequences (yellow and green bands) that influence splicing. These sequences may be splicing enhancers or silencers, polypyrimidine tract binding protein sites or other elements.

== History ==
Minigenes were first described as the somatic assembly of DNA segments and consisted of DNA regions known to encode the protein and the flanking regions required to express the protein. The term was first used in a paper in 1977 to describe the cloning of two minigenes that were designed to express a peptide.

RNA splicing was discovered in the late 1970s through the study of adenoviruses that invade mammals and replicate inside them. Researchers identified RNA molecules that contained sequences from noncontiguous parts of the virus's genome. This discovery led to the conclusion that regulatory mechanisms existed which affected mature RNA and the genes it expresses. Using minigenes as a splice reporting vector to explore the effects of RNA splicing regulation naturally followed and remains the major use of minigenes to date.

== Types ==
In order to provide a good minigene model, the gene fragment should have all of the necessary elements to ensure it exhibits the same alternative splicing (AS) patterns as the wild type gene, i.e., the length of the fragment must include all upstream and downstream sequences which can affect its splicing. Therefore, most minigene designs begin with a thorough in silico analysis of the requirements of the experiment before any "wet" lab work is conducted. With the advent of Bioinformatics and widespread use of computers, several good programs now exist for the identification of cis-acting control regions that affect the splicing outcomes of a gene and advanced programs can even consider splicing outcomes in various tissue types. Differences in minigenes are usually reflected in the final size of the fragment, which is in turn a reflection of the complexity of the minigene itself. The number of foreign DNA elements (exon and introns) inserted into the constitutive exons and introns of a given fragment varies with the type of experiment and the information being sought. A typical experiment might involve wild type minigenes which are expected to express genes normally in a comparison run against genetically engineered allelic variations which replace the wild-type gene and have been cloned into the same flanking sequences as the original fragment. These types of experiments help to determine the effect of various mutations on pre-mRNA splicing.

== Construction ==
Once a suitable genomic fragment is chosen (Step 1), the exons and introns of the fragment can be inserted and amplified, along with the flanking constitutive exons and introns of the original gene, by PCR. The primers for PCR can be chosen so that they leave "sticky ends" at 3' sense and anti-sense strands (Step 2). These "sticky-ends" can be easily incorporated into a TOPO Vector by ligation into a commercially available source which has ligase already attached to it at the sight of incorporation (Step 3). The subsequent TOPO Vectors can be transfected into E.coli cells (Step 4). After incubation, total RNA can be extracted from the bacterial colonies and analyzed using RT-PCR to quantify ratios of exon inclusion/exclusion (step 5). The minigene can be transfected into different cell types with various splicing factors to test trans-acting elements (Step 6). The expressed genes or the proteins they encode can be analyzed to evaluate splicing components and their effects via a variety of methods including hybridization or size-exclusion chromatography.

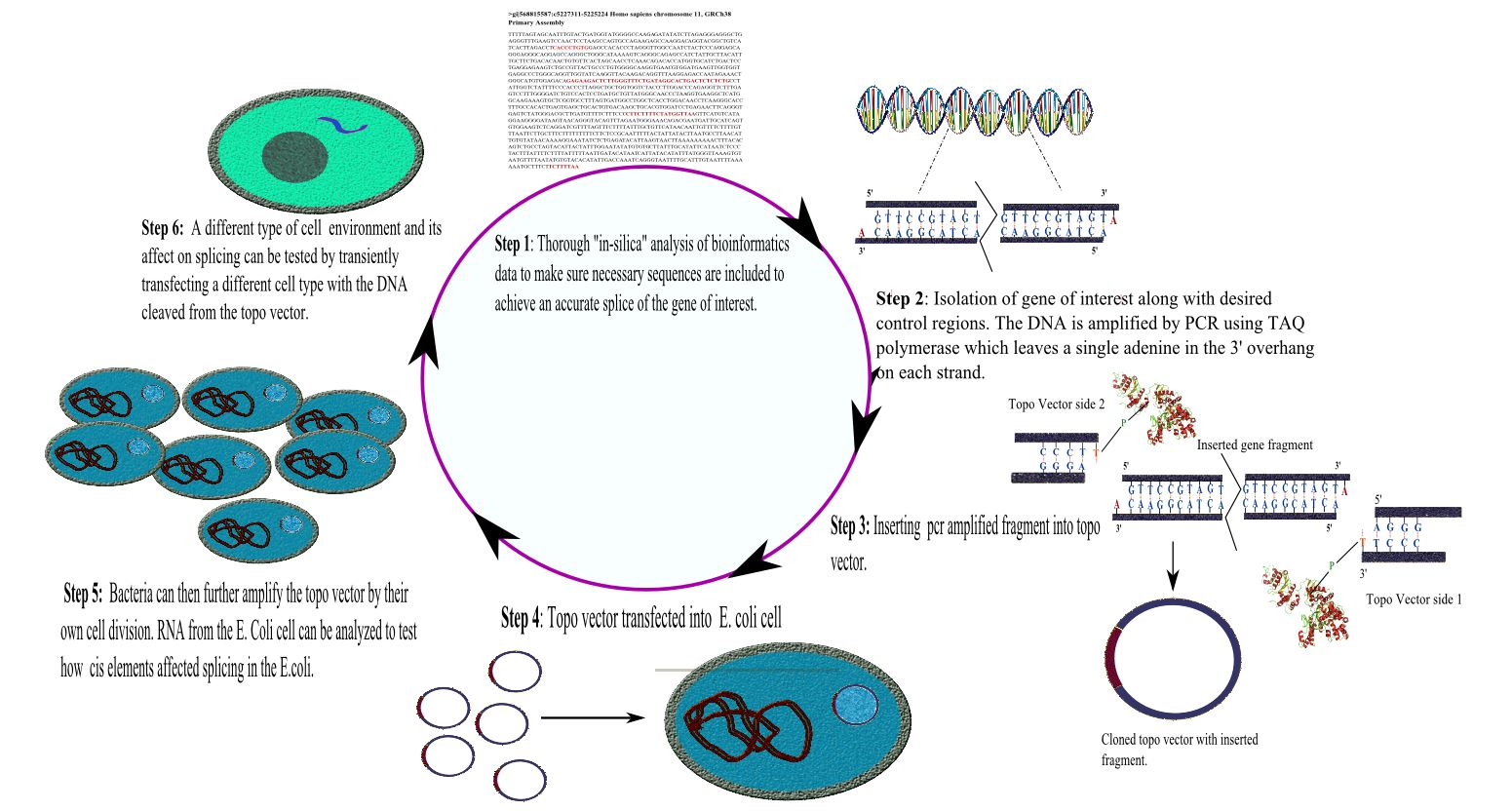
A typical cycle for constructing a minigene.

== Uses ==
RNA splicing errors have been estimated to occur in a third of genetic diseases. To understand pathogenesis and identify potential targets of therapeutic intervention in these diseases, explicating the splicing elements involved is essential. Determining the complete set of components involved in splicing presents many challenges due to the abundance of alternative splicing, which occurs in most human genes, and the specificity in which splicing is carried out in vivo. Splicing is distinctly conducted from cell type to cell type and across different stages of cellular development. Therefore, it is critical that any in vitro or bioinformatic assumptions about splicing regulation are confirmed in vivo. Minigenes are used to elucidate cis-regulatory elements, trans-regulatory elements and other regulators of pre-mature RNA splicing in vivo. Minigenes have been applied to the study of a diverse array of genetic diseases due to the aforementioned abundance of alternatively spliced genes and the specificity and variation observed in splicing regulation. The following are examples of minigene use in various diseases. While it is not an exhaustive list, it does provide a better understanding of how minigenes are utilized.

=== Endocrine diseases ===
RNA splicing errors can have drastic effects on how proteins function, including the hormones secreted by the endocrine system. These effects on hormones have been identified as the cause of many endocrine disorders including thyroid-related pathological conditions, rickets, hyperinsulinemic hypoglycemia and congenital adrenal hyperplasia. One specific example of a splicing error causing an endocrine disease that has been studied using minigenes is a type of growth hormone deficiency called isolated growth hormone deficiency (IGHD), a disease that results in growth failure. IGHD type II is an autosomal dominant form caused by a mutation in the intervening sequence (IVS) adjacent to exon 3 of the gene encoding growth hormone 1, the GH-1 gene. This mutated form of IVS3 causes exon 3 to be skipped in the mRNA product. The mRNA (-E3) encodes a truncated form of hGH that then inhibits normal hGH secretion. Minigenes were used to determine that a point mutation within an intron splice enhancer (ISE) embedded in IVS3 was to blame for the skipping of E3. Moreover, it was determined that the function of the ISE is influenced by a nearby transposable AC element, revealing that this particular splicing error is caused by a trans-acting factor.

=== Neurodegenerative diseases ===
Accumulation of tau protein is associated with neurodegenerative diseases including Alzheimer's and Parkinson's diseases as well as other tauopathies. Tau protein isoforms are created by alternative splicing of exons 2, 3 and 10. The regulation of tau splicing is specific to stage of development, physiology and location. Errors in tau splicing can occur in both exons and introns and, depending on the error, result in changes to protein structure or loss of function. Aggregation of these abnormal tau proteins correlates directly with pathogenesis and disease progression. Minigenes have been used by several researchers to help understand the regulatory components responsible for mRNA splicing of the TAU gene.

=== Cancer ===
Cancer is a complex, heterogeneous disease that can be hereditary or the result of environmental stimuli. Minigenes are used to help oncologists understand the roles pre-mRNA splicing plays in different cancer types. Of particular interest are cancer specific genetic mutations that disrupt normal splicing events, including those affecting spliceosome components and RNA-binding proteins such as heterogeneous nuclear ribonucleoparticules (hnRNP), serine/arginine-rich (SR) proteins and small ribonucleoproteins (snRNP). Proteins encoded by aberrantly spliced pre-mRNAs are functionally different and contribute to the characteristic anomalies exhibited by cancer cells, including their ability to proliferate, invade and undergo angiogenesis, and metastasis. Minigenes help researchers identify genetic mutations in cancer that result in splicing errors and determine the downstream effects those splicing errors have on gene expression. Using knowledge obtained from studies employing minigenes, oncologists have proposed tests designed to detect products of abnormal gene expression for diagnostic purposes. Additionally, the prospect of using minigenes as a cancer immunotherapy is being explored.

== See also ==
- Recombinant DNA
- RNA Splicing
- Exon
- Intron
- Transfection
- Cloning vector
