= MRNA-1283 =

Vaccine candidate against COVID-19

mRNA-1283
Vaccine description
- Target: SARS-CoV-2
- Vaccine type: mRNA

Clinical data
- Trade names: mNEXSPIKE
- Routes of administration: Intramuscular

mRNA-1283, sold under the brand name mNEXSPIKE, is a COVID-19 vaccine candidate developed by Moderna.

Compared to prior mRNA vaccines, this candidate has a storage temperature of 2-5 °C, compatible with vaccine storage in a standard refrigerator, rather than low temperature freezers. Additionally, the vaccine will be packaged in prefilled syringes, reducing burden on healthcare workers and potentially increasing access.

== Clinical Trial ==
In December, Moderna started a clinical trial which would evaluate the vaccine's ability to provoke an immune response and its safety. As of May 2024, the vaccine candidate is in Phase 3 clinical trials, with an estimated completion date of late August 2024. Preliminary results from this trial indicated the vaccine produced a strong immune response, especially in patients over 65, who are at greater risk for severe outcomes from COVID-19.

mRNA-1283 was approved by the Food and Drug Administration on May 30, 2025, under the name "mNEXSPIKE", for use in adults 65 years or older and individuals 12-64 years old with at least one comorbidity.
