= Vaxart =

American biotechnology company

Vaxart, Inc.

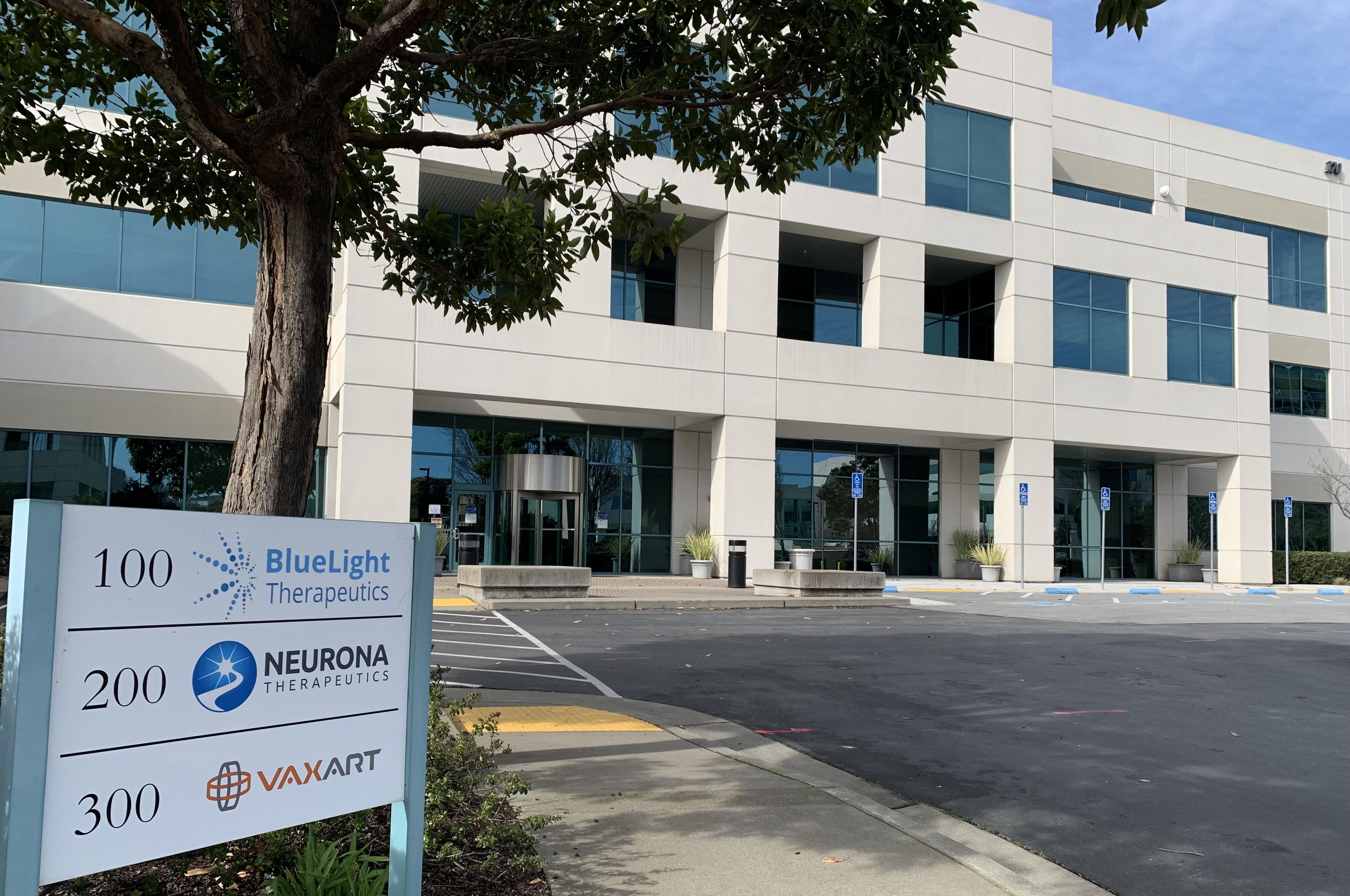
- Vaxart's HQ located in South San Francisco
- Type: Public
- Traded as: Nasdaq: VXRT
- Industry: Biotechnology
- Founded: 2004; 22 years ago
- Founder: Sean Tucker
- Headquarters: South San Francisco, California
- Key people: Steven Lo (CEO)
- Products: Oral vaccines
- Revenue: ▲US $7.38 million (2023)
- Net income: ▼US -$82.4 million (2023)
- Number of employees: 109 (2023)
- Website: vaxart.com

Vaxart, Inc. is an American biotechnology company focused on the discovery, development, and commercialization of oral recombinant vaccines administered using temperature-stable tablets that can be stored and shipped without refrigeration, eliminating the need for needle injection. Its development programs for oral vaccine delivery (Vector-Adjuvant-Antigen Standardized Technology known as VAAST) include prophylactic, enteric-coated tablet vaccines for inhibiting norovirus, seasonal influenza, respiratory syncytial virus, and human papillomavirus. It was founded in 2004 by Sean Tucker. Originally incorporated as West Coast Biologicals, Inc. in California in 2004, the company later changed its name to Vaxart, Inc. in July 2007, after reincorporating in Delaware. A significant development in the company's history was the reverse merger with Aviragen Therapeutics, Inc. on February 13, 2018, which led to Vaxart becoming a wholly owned subsidiary of Aviragen. Post-merger, the company continued as Vaxart, Inc.

Vaxart's development portfolio includes a range of oral vaccines targeting infectious diseases such as norovirus, COVID-19, and seasonal influenza, as well as therapeutic vaccines like those targeting HPV. The company has achieved significant milestones in its vaccine development, including completing Phase 1 trials for its COVID-19 vaccine candidate and embarking on Phase 2 studies. Vaxart’s vaccines are designed to elicit not only systemic immune responses but also mucosal and T cell responses, which enhances protection against specific diseases and offer potential benefits for certain cancers and chronic viral infections. The tablet form of these vaccines represents a significant advancement in vaccine administration, potentially improving patient acceptance and resolving distribution challenges.

== Technology ==
The Vaxart technology is based on the potential to prevent or inhibit infectious diseases by using orally delivered vaccines by tablets, eliminating intramuscular injection concerns which may involve pain, fear of needles, cross-contamination, dosing inconsistencies, and higher cost for large-scale immunizations. As a proof of concept for oral vaccination efficacy, an oral vaccine against polio was proved to be safe and effective, and is in common use in many countries.

Vaxart uses enteric-coated tablets to protect the active vaccine from acidic degradation in the stomach, delivering the vaccine into the small intestine where it can engage the immune system to stimulate systemic and mucosal immune responses against a virus.

Vaxart uses a specific virus called adenovirus type 5 (Ad5) as a delivery biological "vector" to carry genes coding for the antigen to generate a protective immune response. The Ad5 vector delivers the antigen to the epithelial cells lining the mucosa of the small intestine where it stimulates the immune system to respond against the vaccine antigen, creating a systemic immune response against a virus.

In addition to its focus on infectious diseases, Vaxart has expanded its vaccine development efforts to include therapeutic vaccines for chronic viral infections and cancer. These efforts are anchored in the company's innovative technology that enables the creation of tablet-based vaccines, which can generate broad and durable immune responses, including systemic, mucosal, and T-cell responses. This comprehensive immune activation is particularly critical in the context of chronic viral infections and cancer, where both systemic and localized immune responses play a pivotal role in effective treatment.

== Vaccine development ==
=== Influenza Vaccine ===
The lead vaccine candidate by Vaxart is an influenza oral tablet vaccine, which showed safety and neutralizing antibody responses to influenza virus in a 2015 Phase I clinical trial. A 2016-17 Phase II trial of the Vaxart oral flu vaccine, VXA-A1.1, showed that the vaccine was well-tolerated and provided immunity against virus shedding, outperforming the effectiveness of an established intramuscular vaccine. In 2018, Vaxart completed a Phase II challenge study, in which the Vaxart influenza tablet vaccine demonstrated a 39 percent reduction in clinical disease relative to placebo, compared to a 27 percent reduction by the injectable flu vaccine, Fluzone.

=== COVID-19 vaccine ===
In January 2020, Vaxart announced they were intending to develop a tablet vaccine intended to prevent COVID-19. It faced competition from other vaccine makers, such as Novavax, Inovio Pharmaceuticals, and Moderna. By February 2020, Vaxart had begun the program. In April 2020, the company reported positive immune responses in laboratory animals from tests conducted with its COVID-19 vaccine candidate, suggesting potential effectiveness in its approach to vaccination.

In January 2024, Vaxart received a grant from the United States Biomedical Advanced Research and Development Authority (BARDA). The grant, amounting to $9.27 million, is allocated for the preparation of a large-scale Phase 2b clinical trial involving 10,000 participants. This trial is designed to evaluate the efficacy of Vaxart's innovative oral pill XBB COVID-19 vaccine candidate in comparison to an approved mRNA vaccine. The funding is part of Project NextGen, a substantial $5 billion initiative by the U.S. Department of Health and Human Services (HHS) focusing on the development of new, innovative vaccines and therapeutics that provide broader and more durable protection against COVID-19. The oral vaccine platform developed by Vaxart is noted for its potential advantages, including generating mucosal immunity and offering a cross-reactive response to various COVID-19 variants. A favorable recommendation from an independent Data Safety Monitoring Board (DSMB) reviewing the sentinel cohort of 400 participants further affirmed the trial's safety and allowed it to proceed without modifications.

=== Norovirus vaccine ===
Vaxart has been progressing in the development of an oral tablet vaccine for Norovirus, the leading cause of acute gastroenteritis globally. Norovirus significantly impacts all age groups, particularly young children and the elderly, causing millions of cases annually with substantial healthcare and economic burdens.

Its vaccine candidate is a bivalent oral tablet targeting major norovirus genogroups GI and GII. The tablet form is specifically crafted to generate antibodies in the intestine, the primary site of norovirus infection.

In December 2022, Vaxart received significant funding and support from the Bill & Melinda Gates Foundationfor a study focusing on breastfeeding mothers and their infants. This study aligns with Vaxart’s broader norovirus vaccine program goals, targeting critical and at-risk populations globally.

In 2023, Vaxart initiated a Phase 1 trial (VXA-NVV-108) focused on lactating mothers, aiming to evaluate the vaccine's ability to induce breast milk antibodies and their transfer to infants. Furthermore, in July 2023, Vaxart announced positive topline data from a dose-ranging Phase 2 clinical trial of its bivalent norovirus vaccine candidate. The study met all primary endpoints, showing the vaccine was well-tolerated with robust immunogenicity.

Additionally, in September 2023, Vaxart announced top-line data from its Phase 2 challenge study of the monovalent norovirus vaccine candidate. This study met 5 of its 6 primary endpoints, demonstrating a statistically significant reduction in norovirus infection rate and a substantial reduction in viral shedding, while maintaining a well-tolerated safety profile.

== Investment ==
In 2019, several hedge funds invested in Vaxart, with the largest investment coming from Armistice Capital which acquired 25.2 million shares.

=== Legal Proceedings ===
Vaxart’s investments and stock trading activities led to two major legal cases:

==== Stockholder Derivative Lawsuit ====
In 2021, a group of shareholders filed a lawsuit in the Delaware Court of Chancery (In re Vaxart, Inc. Stockholder Litigation), alleging that company executives engaged in insider trading and violated their fiduciary duties by profiting from misleading vaccine-related statements. The case was dismissed in early 2024.

==== Federal Securities Class Action ====
A separate securities fraud class action lawsuit (In re Vaxart, Inc. Securities Litigation) was filed in the U.S. District Court for the Northern District of California, accusing Vaxart of misleading investors about its involvement in Operation Warp Speed. Judge Vince Chhabria presides over the case, which was certified as a class action in December 2024. Vaxart was dismissed from the case in late 2024 after the court ruled there was insufficient evidence to support the claims against the company.

Vaxart has denied all allegations and continues to focus on developing its oral vaccine platform.

== See also ==
- Coronavirus disease 2019
- COVID-19 pandemic
- Severe acute respiratory syndrome–related coronavirus
- Vaccine
- Respiratory disease
- 2009 flu pandemic vaccine
