= EpiVax =

American biotechnology company

- Industry: Biotechnology
- Founded: 1998; 28 years ago
- Founders: Anne Searls De Groot
- Headquarters: Rhode Island
- Key people: Anne Searls De Groot (CEO, CSO)
- Website: epivax.com

EpiVax is an American biotechnology company, founded in 1998 by Anne Searls De Groot. EpiVax holds the exclusive license to the EpiMatrix vaccine design technology.

== History ==
EpiVax was founded in 1998. In 2015, EpiVax collaborated with Ipsen to complete a new approach for producing botulinum neurotoxin (BoNT) and Targeted Secretion Inhibitor (TSI) therapeutics. EpiVax applied its proprietary T cell epitope modification technology (“ISPRI”) to generate an engineered BoNT sequence.

In 2020, it developed a COVID-19 vaccine, EPV-CoV19, in partnership with the University of Georgia and Immunomic Therapeutics.
