= Gritstone Bio =

American biotechnology company

- Formerly: Gritstone Oncology, Inc.
- Type: Biotechnology company
- Industry: Biotechnology
- Founded: August 2015
- Founder: Andrew Allen
- Fate: Filed for Chapter 11 bankruptcy in October 2024
- Headquarters: Emeryville, California, U.S.
- Key people: Vassiliki “Celia” Economides (interim CEO, CFO)
- Products: Cancer immunotherapies, infectious disease vaccines, self-amplifying mRNA SARS-CoV-2 vaccine (GRT-R910)
- Services: Immunotherapy and vaccine development
- Revenue: (2021 (September))

Gritstone Bio, previously Gritstone Oncology, was a clinical-stage American biotechnology company which attempted to develop cancer and infectious disease immunotherapies and vaccines. It was founded in August 2015 as Gritstone Oncology, Inc. Its offices were Emeryville, California. It filed for Chapter 11 Bankruptcy in October 2024.

Gritstone started a Phase 1 trial of its self-amplifying mRNA second generation SARS-CoV-2 vaccine, GRT-R910, in the NIHCR Manchester Clinical Research Facility at Manchester Royal Infirmary, in September 2021. Their goal was to explore the ability of GRT-R910 to boost and expand the immunogenicity of AstraZeneca's first-generation COVID-19 vaccine AZD1222 (Vaxzevria) in healthy adults of more than 60 years. It used lipid nanoparticles to deliver a broad set of antigens against SARS-CoV-2 that included both stabilized spike protein and highly conserved viral protein regions containing T cell epitopes.

On 10 November 2021, Gritstone announced positive preclinical data of its second-generation self-amplifying mRNA (SAM) vaccine against SARS-CoV-2 in non-human primate models.

It was in a Phase 1/2 study, in collaboration with Bristol Myers Squibb, in 26 patients with metastatic solid tumors.

In October 2024, Gritstone filed for Chapter 11 bankruptcy protection in efforts to move forward with its "strategic alternatives process".

On December 31, 2024, Andrew Allen, M.D., Ph.D., co-founder, President, and Chief Executive Officer of Gritstone Bio, stepped down from his role following the company's asset sale. Dr. Allen's departure, along with other key executives, marked a significant shift in Gritstone Bio's leadership.
