= Covi =

Covi is a surname of Italian origin. Notable people with this surname include:

- Alessandro Covi (born 1998), Italian cyclist
- Andrea Covi (born 1968), Italian sprint canoeist
- Carlo Covi (born 1961), Italian Venetist politician
- Ibrahim Covi (born 2000), French footballer
- Francis Covi (1906–1966), Dahomeyan politician and educator
- Tizza Covi (born 1978), Italian screenwriter and director

== See also ==
- Covini Engineering, Italian car manufacturer
