= HGC019 =

Vaccine hopeful against COVID-19

Vaccine description
- Target: SARS-CoV-2
- Vaccine type: mRNA

Clinical data
- Other names: HGCO19, Gemcovac, GEMCOVAC-19
- Routes of administration: Intramuscular
- ATC code: None

HGC019 is a mRNA and Self-amplifying mRNA (saRNA) based COVID-19 vaccine candidate being developed by Gennova Biopharmaceuticals and HDT Bio Corp. with active support from NIH under The Indo-US Vaccine Action Program (VAP) and Department of Biotechnology, India.

== Clinical trials ==
The phase-I trials began in February 2021 after receiving permission from Drugs Controller General of India (DGCI), to evaluate the safety and immunogenicity of the vaccine candidate in about 120 participants consisting of age group (18–70) years.

The phase-II trials is planned to conduct with 500 participants from the age group (18–75) years. On 24 August 2021, the Drugs Controller General of India gave a go for phase II/III trials after it was found to be safe, tolerable, and immunogenic in the phase I trial results.

== Economics ==
The company has received a funding of ₹250 crore (around US$33.5 million) from Government of India based on the clinical trials progress.
