= ABNCoV2 =

Vaccine candidate against COVID-19

Vaccine description
- Target: SARS-CoV-2
- Vaccine type: Virus-like particles

Clinical data
- Routes of administration: Intramuscular

Identifiers
- CAS Number: 2698316-97-9

ABNCoV2 is a cVLP COVID-19 vaccine candidate developed by Expres2ion Biotechnologies and Adaptvac, outlicensed to Bavarian Nordic.

On 9 August 2021, it was announced that the first round of trials of the vaccine had been finalized with good results among 45 test subjects.
