= COH04S1 =

Vaccine candidate against COVID-19

Vaccine description
- Target: SARS-CoV-2
- Vaccine type: Viral vector

Clinical data
- Routes of administration: Intramuscular

Identifiers
- CAS Number: 2716897-29-7

COH04S1 is a covid vaccine developed by the City of Hope Medical Center. This vaccine targets patients who are immunocompromised; immunocompromised patients have often shown a weak antibody response to past COVID-19 vaccines. COH04S1 is also targeted on people who are at a high risk of COVID-19 complications. The City of Hope Medical Center strives to make a better option than the current EUA and FDA approved vaccines, which are not working as well on this group of individuals.

The group leading the investigation of the vaccine is led by scientists named Felix Wussow with a Ph.D., Flavia Chiuppesi with a Ph.D. as well, them both City of Hope assistant research professors in the Department of Hematology & Hematopoietic Cell Transplantation. The leader is named Don J. Diamond, Ph.D.: professor in the Department of Hematology & Hematopoietic Cell Transplantation at City of Hope. The vaccine is the first to study the safety and effectiveness in patients that have received a bone marrow transplant or chimeric antigen receptor therapy. It is also the first to look at the differences between the Pfizer vaccine with one that accommodates people who are receiving immunosuppressive therapy.

Previous COVID-19 vaccines in blood cancer patients show a high probability that 1 out of 4 blood cancer patients fail to produce antibodies. COH04S1 hopes to lower the chances of failure in producing antibodies in blood cancer patients.

This vaccine is built on a FDA-approved platform known as modified vaccinia ankara, also known as MVA. This platform has famously been used safely worldwide and effectively in cancer and transplant patients.

== Phase 1 Trial ==
The vaccine has presently passed a phase 1 trial with healthy volunteers between the ages of 18 and 55 who have not had COVID-19. The vaccine aims to make the immune system produce antibodies as well as make the body produce T cells that provide long-term protection against future outbreaks. They first developed a MVA delivery vehicle, to keep the genetic components for a compound at a molecular level. SARS-CoV-2 and nucleocapsid proteins were injected into the platform for it to replicate DNA within cells, which would trigger the strong reproduction of T cells as well as potent antibodies against the virus. MVA vaccines are proven to produce an immune response within 14 days with only mild side effects.

The trial patients would have received two shots with 28 days in between, not knowing whether either of them were placebos or not.

== Phase 2 Trial ==
COH04S1 is currently the only COVID-19 vaccine to pass on to phase 2 trials in cancer patients. This vaccine does not grow or reproduce in the human body, making it fit for stem cell transplant and CAR T patients. The volunteers will be closely monitored soon after the trial as well as a check up a year after the trial.

City of Hope accepted blood cancer patients who received a bone marrow transplant, or a CAR T cell therapy at least three months before volunteering, as well as meeting other requirements.
