= LYB001 =

Vaccine candidate against COVID-19

Vaccine description
- Target: SARS-CoV-2
- Vaccine type: Virus-like particles

Clinical data
- Routes of administration: Intramuscular

LYB001 is a COVID-19 vaccine candidate developed by Yantai Patronus Biotech Co., Ltd.

It was found to be safe and well tolerated.
