= AKS-452 =

Vaccine candidate against COVID-19

Vaccine description
- Target: SARS-CoV-2
- Vaccine type: Protein subunit

Clinical data
- Routes of administration: Intramuscular

Identifiers
- CAS Number: 2699015-60-4

AKS-452 is a COVID-19 vaccine candidate developed by Akston Biosciences.
