= SCTV01C =

Vaccine candidate against COVID-19

Vaccine description
- Target: SARS-CoV-2
- Vaccine type: Protein subunit

Clinical data
- Routes of administration: Intramuscular

Identifiers
- CAS Number: 2714576-04-0

SCTV01C is a COVID-19 vaccine candidate developed by Sinocelltech.
