= ZF2001 =

Vaccine against COVID-19

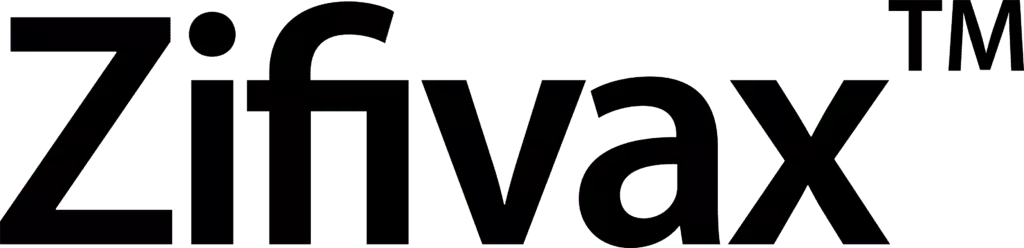
- Logo

Vaccine description
- Target: SARS-CoV-2
- Vaccine type: Protein subunit

Clinical data
- Trade names: Zifivax
- Routes of administration: Intramuscular
- ATC code: None

Legal status
- Legal status: Full list of Zifivax authorizations

Identifiers
- CAS Number: 2609662-31-7
- DrugBank: DB15893

ZF2001, trade-named Zifivax or ZF-UZ-VAC-2001, is an adjuvanted protein subunit COVID-19 vaccine developed by Anhui Zhifei Longcom in collaboration with the Institute of Microbiology at the Chinese Academy of Sciences. The vaccine candidate is in Phase III trials with 29,000 participants in China, Ecuador, Malaysia, Pakistan, and Uzbekistan.

ZF2001 employs technology similar to other protein-based vaccines in Phase III trials from Novavax, Vector Institute, and Medicago.

ZF2001 was first approved for use in Uzbekistan and later China. Production capacity is expected to be one billion doses a year in China and 200 million in Uzbekistan. By July, 100 million doses had been administered in China and Uzbekistan.

== Medical uses ==
It is administered in three doses over a period of two months.

=== Efficacy ===
In August 2021, preliminary data from a phase III study with 28,500 participants indicated an overall efficacy of 82% against disease of any severity. Efficacy was 93% against the Alpha variant and 78% against the Delta variant.

In July 2021, lab studies showed ZF2001 retained neutralizing effects against B.1.429 (Epsilon), B.1.351(Beta), P.1(Gamma), B.1.525(Eta), B.1.617.1(Kappa), the neutralizing titers decreased ranging from 1.1 fold to 2.1 fold, but the neutralizing efficacy were still good.

== Manufacturing ==
According to industry experts, production for this kind of vaccine is stable and reliable, and easier to achieve large-scale industrial production at home and overseas. However it was noted it can be very inconvenient for people to come back for a second and third dose. Subunit vaccines are delivered alongside adjuvants and booster doses may be required.

The company's vaccine manufacturing facility was put into use in September. In February 2021, management said the company had an annual production capacity of 1 billion doses.

In July 2021, an agreement was reached to produce the vaccine in Uzbekistan starting with 10 million doses a month and eventually 200 million doses a year.

== History ==
=== Clinical trials ===
==== Phase I and II trials and results ====
In June 2020, Longcom began a double-blind, randomized, placebo parallel controlled Phase I trial with 50 participants aged 18–59 in Chongqing divided into low-dose, high-dose, and placebo groups.

In July, Longcom began a randomized, double-blind, placebo-controlled Phase II trial with 900 participants aged 18–59 in Changsha, Hunan divided into low-dose, high-dose, and placebo groups. In August, an additional Phase II trial was launched with 50 participants aged 60 and above.

In Phase II results published in The Lancet, on the two-dose schedule, seroconversion rates of neutralizing antibodies after the second dose were 76% (114 of 150 participants) in a 25 μg group and 72% (108 of 150) in a 50 μg group. On the three-dose schedule, seroconversion rate of neutralizing antibodies after the third dose were 97% (143 of 148 participants) in the 25 μg group and 93% (138 of 148) in the 50 μg group. 7 to 14 days after the administration of the third dose, the GMTs of neutralizing antibodies reached levels that were significantly higher than observed in human convalescent serum of recovering COVID-19 patients, especially in the 25 μg group.

==== Phase III trials ====
In December 2020, Longcom began enrollment of a Phase III randomized, double-blind, placebo-controlled clinical trial for 29,000 participants, including 750 participants between 18-59 and 250 participants 60 and older in China and 21,000 participants between 18-59 and 7,000 participants 60 and older outside China.

In December 2020, Malaysia's MyEG announced it would conduct Phase III trials. If the trials were successful, MyEG would be the sole distributor of ZF2001 in Malaysia for 3 years.

In December 2020, Uzbekistan began a year-long Phase III trial of ZF2001 with 5,000 volunteers between 18 and 59.

In December 2020, Ecuador's Minister of Health, Juan Carlos Zevallos announced Phase III trials would involve between 5,000 and 8,000 volunteers.

In February 2021, Pakistan's Drug Regulatory Authority (DRAP) approved Phase III trials with approximately 10,000 participants to be conducted at UHS Lahore, National Defense Hospital, and Agha Khan Hospital.

The vaccine is also being trialed in Indonesia.

==== Children and adolescents trial ====
In July 2021, Longcom began a randomized, blinded, placebo-controlled phase I with 75 participants aged 3–17.

In November 2021, Longcom began a phase II with 400 participants aged 3–17.

=== Authorizations ===
On 1 March 2021, Uzbekistan granted approval for ZF2001 (under tradename ZF-UZ-VAC 2001) after having taken part in the Phase III trials. In March, Uzbekistan received 1 million doses and started vaccinations in April. By June, a total of 6.5 million doses had been delivered.

In March 2021, China approved of ZF2001 for emergency use after being approved by Uzbekistan earlier in the month.

In June 2021, Malaysia's MyEG signed a letter of intent to purchase 10 million doses of the vaccine.

On 7 September, the National Agency of Drug and Food Control of Indonesia (BPOM) published the emergency use authorization for Zifivax.

On 10 January 2022, the National Agency of Drug and Food Control of Indonesia (BPOM) published the emergency use authorization for Zifivax as Booster for Sinovac.

== Research ==
As described in Cell, the CoV spike receptor-binding domain (RBD) is an attractive vaccine target for coronaviruses but is constrained by limited immunogenicity, however a dimeric form of MERS-CoV RBD offers greater protection. The RBD-dimer significantly increases neutralizing antibodies compared to a conventional monomeric form and protected mice against MERS-CoV infection. CoV RBD-dimer have been produced at high yields in pilot scale production.

Rather than injecting a whole virus, subunit vaccines contains virus particles specially selected to stimulate an immune response. Because the fragments cannot cause disease, subunit vaccines are considered very safe. Subunit vaccines in widespread use include the Hepatitis B vaccine and Pertussis vaccine. However, as only a few viral components are included in the vaccine which does not display the full complexity of the virus, their efficacy may be limited.
