= COVI-VAC (U.S. COVID-19 vaccine) =

Vaccine candidate against COVID-19

Vaccine description
- Target: SARS-CoV-2
- Vaccine type: Attenuated

Clinical data
- Trade names: CDX-005
- Other names: Covi-Vax
- Routes of administration: Intranasal

Identifiers
- CAS Number: 2695472-84-3

COVI-VAC (codenamed CDX-005) is a COVID-19 vaccine developed by Codagenix, Inc. In December 2020, COVI-VAC started a Phase I clinical trial, involving 48 participants. The trial was scheduled to complete in June 2021, with results to be reported by May 2022. On September 29, 2021, Codagenix presented positive phase 1 data for COVI-VAC at IDWEEK2021. Data indicates that COVI-VAC is well tolerated, with no significant adverse events reported and that administration of the intranasal vaccine was immunogenic and capable of blocking nasal replication of the virus with minimal viral shedding, recorded at levels lower than those likely to result in subsequent transmission of COVID-19. Furthermore, COVI-VAC was shown to stimulate both serum and mucosal antibody immune responses.

== Medical uses ==
The vaccine is administered intranasally and requires a single dose.

== Pharmacology ==
COVI-VAC is a live attenuated vaccine.

== Clinical trials ==
=== Phase I ===
In December 2020, Codagenix started a Phase I trial in the United Kingdom.

In September 2021, Codagenix reported that the trial had shown COVI-VAC to be safe and immunogenic.
