= Inovio Pharmaceuticals =

American biotechnology company

Inovio Pharmaceuticals, Inc.
- Type: Public
- Traded as: Nasdaq: INO
- Industry: Biotechnology
- Founded: 1999; 27 years ago
- Headquarters: Plymouth Meeting, Pennsylvania
- Key people: Jacqueline Shea, Ph.D. (president and CEO)
- Products: DNA-based Medicines and Vaccines
- Revenue: ▲$7 Million(2020)
- Number of employees: 262
- Website: inovio.com

Inovio Pharmaceuticals, Inc. is an American biotechnology company focused on the discovery, development, and commercialization of synthetic DNA products for treating cancers and infectious diseases. In April 2020, Inovio was among some 100 companies, academic centers, or research organizations developing a vaccine candidate for treating people infected with COVID-19, with more than 170 total vaccine candidates in development (June 2020).

== Technology ==
The Inovio technology is based on inserting engineered DNA into cells, where it becomes transcribed into mRNA and translated into proteins. The proteins encoded by the DNA elicit immune response to antigens from cancers and viruses, by stimulating the production of T cells and antibodies that aid recovery. The technology can be "targeted" to specific types of cancer and immune diseases, such as those produced by a virus.

During a meeting of the White House Coronavirus Task Force in March 2020, CEO, Joseph Kim, said that Inovio scientists had designed a vaccine candidate (INO-4800) for the COVID-19 coronavirus in January, in three hours, after the virus' genetic sequence was first published.

Shareholders sued Inovio in August 2020, claiming it exaggerated evidence of its coronavirus vaccine's efficacy in order to boost its stock price.

=== License of electroporation device ===
In 2006, Inovio licensed "certain patented technology relating to the delivery of gene-based therapeutics into skin", as well as patents "involving the delivery of genes or drugs via ex vivo, intratumoral and intramuscular electroporation... The ex-vivo patents are relevant to the delivery of genes to dendritic and stem cells."

=== Licence of US7328064B2 ===
Sometime after its publication in February 2008, Inovio was assigned a patent for "an apparatus [that provides] for injecting a fluid into body tissue, the apparatus comprising: a hollow needle; and a fluid delivery means, wherein the apparatus is adapted to actuate the fluid delivery means in use so as to automatically inject fluid into body tissue during insertion of the needle into the said body tissue."

=== Cellectra injection device ===
To facilitate use of its potential products, Inovio manufactures a proprietary injection device, called "Cellectra", which the company describes as providing a "brief electrical pulse to reversibly open small pores in the cell to allow the plasmids to enter, overcoming a key limitation of other DNA and other nucleic acid approaches, such as mRNA." The small device, which runs on "AA" batteries, is designed for use in the field under the difficult conditions of an epidemic.

In June 2020 – in anticipation of the Inovio COVID-19 vaccine candidate becoming successful – the US Department of Defense invested US$71 million to further develop Cellectra as a handheld device and to preorder an undisclosed number of the devices.

== Vaccine development ==
Inovio's logo prior to 2020

In a 2016 dose-escalation Phase I clinical trial to assess safety after intramuscular injection in healthy adults, the Inovio vaccine candidate, INO-4700 (also called GLS-5300) for development against Middle East respiratory syndrome (MERS) coronavirus, proved to be safe with only mild symptoms and no adverse effects. The trial also demonstrated immunogenicity by dose-independent immune responses detected in more than 85% of subjects after two vaccinations that were durable a year later.

In 2016, Inovio was involved, along with their partners GeneOne Life Science, in an attempt to control the Zika virus outbreak in Miami. In fact, they "were the first to initiate a human Zika DNA vaccine trial... [for] the safety, tolerability, and immunogenicity of GLS-5700 in 40 healthy adults. The trial's estimated completion date is November 2017." Then in Puerto Rico, where a Zika emergency had been declared, they did a study with 160 previously healthy adults using their proprietary "Cellectra-3P" technology. Preliminary results for the Miami trial were self-reported at the end of 2017.

In February 2020 after receiving details of the genetic sequence of the coronavirus, Inovio announced that it had produced a preclinical DNA-based vaccine as a potential therapy for COVID-19. Inovio is in competition to develop a coronavirus vaccine with numerous other companies, which were conducting preclinical or early-stage human research on more than 170 vaccine candidates, as of late June. In April 2020, Inovio began a Phase I trial of the COVID-19 vaccine candidate, INO-4800. In May 2021, Inovio announced the results of preclinical studies on a "pan-SARS-CoV-2" DNA vaccine (INO-4802) and plans to initiate phase I/II studies. The vaccine incorporates common overlapping mutations from several SARS-COV-2 variants of concern isolated from several different countries including Brazil and India.

=== Partnerships ===
In January 2020, the Coalition for Epidemic Preparedness Innovations (CEPI) announced it would grant of up to $9 million to Inovio for development of a vaccine against SARS-CoV-2. Inovio has partnerships to develop its COVID-19 vaccine candidate with CEPI, the South Korean National Institute of Health, and the International Vaccine Institute.

=== Clinical research ===
Inovio is collaborating with Beijing Advaccine Biotechnology Co., a Chinese biotech firm, in order to speed its acceptance by regulatory authorities in China, with plans to begin human clinical trials of a candidate vaccine in China during the first half of 2020. Inovio has partnerships with manufacturers to scale up production of a vaccine if preliminary efficacy trials are successful. In April 2020, the company began human Phase I safety studies of its lead vaccine (INO-4800) in the United States, and a Phase I-II trial in South Korea, to test for immunization against the COVID-19 virus. In April 2021, the US Department of Defense discontinued funding of future phase III trials of INO-4800. The company is planning to conduct phase III trials outside the United States.

On 9 July it decided to conduct phase 3 trials in partnership with Beijing-based Advaccine Pharmaceutical company.

In early June, Inovio partnered with the International Vaccine Institute and Seoul National University, South Korea, to advance human research on INO-4800 in a Phase I-II safety and efficacy trial to be conducted on 120 participants at Seoul National University Hospital beginning in June. The trial is funded by the Coalition for Epidemic Preparedness Innovations and supported by the Korea Centers for Disease Control and Prevention and the Korea National Institute of Health.

== History ==
Inovio was formerly known as Electrofect, which was founded in Oslo, Norway in 1999. The company was renamed to Inovio in October 2001.

== See also ==
- Coronavirus disease 2019
- COVID-19 pandemic
- Severe acute respiratory syndrome–related coronavirus
- Vaccine
- COVID-19 vaccine
- 2009 flu pandemic vaccine
