= Sanofi–GSK COVID-19 vaccine =

Protein subunit vaccine against COVID-19

Vaccine description
- Target: SARS-CoV-2
- Vaccine type: Protein subunit

Clinical data
- Trade names: Vidprevtyn Beta
- Other names: VAT00002, VAT00008
- Routes of administration: Intramuscular
- ATC code: J07BN04 (WHO)

Legal status
- Legal status: EU: Marketing authorization granted; List of COVID-19 vaccine authorizations

Identifiers
- CAS Number: 2696235-99-9
- DrugBank: DB16427

The Sanofi–GSK COVID-19 vaccine, sold under the brand name VidPrevtyn Beta, is a COVID-19 vaccine developed by Sanofi Pasteur and GSK.

The Sanofi–GSK COVID‑19 vaccine was authorized for medical use in the European Union in November 2022.

== Medical uses ==
The Sanofi–GSK COVID‑19 vaccine is used as a booster for active immunisation against SARS‑CoV‑2 virus in order to prevent COVID‑19.

== Pharmacology ==
The Sanofi–GSK COVID‑19 vaccine is a recombinant protein subunit vaccine containing the SARS-CoV-2 spike protein, which is produced in insect cells via a baculovirus vector. It also includes an adjuvant made by GSK. It uses the same technology as Sanofi's Flublok influenza vaccine.

== History ==
The Sanofi–GSK COVID‑19 vaccine is under development by the French pharmaceutical company Sanofi and the British pharmaceutical company GlaxoSmithKline. Advanced clinical trials of the vaccine were delayed in December 2020 after it failed to produce a strong immune response in people over the age of 50, most likely due to an insufficient antigen concentration in the vaccine, delaying the launch of the vaccine to late 2021.

=== Clinical trials ===
In September 2020, Sanofi-GSK started for phase I trials with 440 participants in the United States.

In February 2021, Sanofi-GSK started for phase II trials with 722 participants in the United States.

On 27 May 2021, the vaccine began a Phase III trial involving 35,000 participants, which increased to 37,430 participants with trials in Colombia, Dominican Republic, Ghana, Honduras, India, Japan, Kenya, Mexico, Nigeria, Pakistan, Sri Lanka, Uganda, and the United States.

In September 2021, Sanofi-GSK started a booster trial in the United Kingdom. In this study, they will enroll up to 3,145 volunteers who have previously completed a COVID-19 a full vaccine course between 4 and 10 months previously. The purpose of this study is to determine if the investigational COVID-19 vaccines are safe and can stimulate and broaden the immune response against the different COVID-19 variants that cause COVID-19 when given as a single booster injection in participants who have previously been vaccinated with a full course of an authorized COVID-19 vaccine.

=== Non-clinical studies ===
During its development, the vaccine was tested in several non-clinical models including mice, hamsters, rabbits and non-human primates.

=== Co-exclusive licensing agreement with Novavax ===
On May 10, 2024, a Sanofi press release announced a co-exclusive licensing agreement between Sanofi and Novavax "to co-commercialize COVID-19 vaccine and develop novel flu-COVID-19 combination vaccines." The 2026 Nuvaxovid website, including vaccine locator page, is copyright Sanofi and does not feature the Novavax company name.

== Society and culture ==
=== Legal status ===
In July 2021, the Committee for Medicinal Products for Human Use (CHMP) of the European Medicines Agency (EMA) started a rolling review of Vidprevtyn, a COVID-19 vaccine developed by Sanofi Pasteur. The CHMP's decision to start the rolling review is based on preliminary results from laboratory studies (non-clinical data) and early clinical studies in adults, which suggest that the vaccine triggers the production of antibodies that target SARS-CoV-2, the virus that causes COVID-19, and may help protect against the disease. Vidprevtyn Beta was authorized for medical use in the European Union in November 2022.

=== Economics ===
In July 2020, the UK government signed up for 60 million doses of a COVID-19 vaccine developed by GSK and Sanofi. It uses a recombinant protein-based technology from Sanofi and GSK's pandemic technology. The companies claimed to be able to produce one billion doses, subject to successful trials and regulatory approval, during the first half of 2021. The company also agreed to a $2.1 billion deal with the United States to produce 100 million doses of the vaccine.

=== Marketing ===
In March 2024, at the request of Sanofi Pasteur, the European Commission withdrew the marketing authorization for VidPrevtyn. Sanofi Pasteur said the decision for the discontinuation was due to commercial reasons.

== See also ==
- Corbevax
