= PTX-COVID19-B =

Vaccine candidate against SARS-CoV-2 (COVID-19)

Vaccine description
- Target: SARS-CoV-2
- Vaccine type: mRNA

Clinical data
- Routes of administration: Intramuscular

Identifiers
- CAS Number: 2695572-65-5

PTX-COVID19-B is a messenger RNA (mRNA)-based COVID-19 vaccine, a vaccine for the prevention of the COVID-19 disease caused by an infection of the SARS-CoV-2 coronavirus, created by Providence Therapeutics—a private Canadian drug company co-founded by Calgary, Alberta-based businessman Brad T. Sorenson and San Francisco–based Eric Marcusson in 2013. A team of eighteen working out of Sunnybrook Research Institute in Toronto, Ontario developed PTX-COVID19-B in less than four weeks, according to the Calgary Herald. Human trials with sixty volunteers began on January 26, 2021, in Toronto.

Providence, which has no manufacturing facilities, partnered with Calgary-based Northern mRNA—the "anchor tenant" in their future manufacturing facilities pending financing.

On April 30, 2021, Sorenson announced that Providence Therapeutics would be leaving Canada and any vaccine that it developed would not be manufactured in Canada.

== History ==
Providence Therapeutics Holdings Inc. was co-founded in Toronto, Ontario by Calgary, Alberta-based businessman Brad T. Sorenson and San Francisco–based Eric Marcusson Ph.D., who was also the Chief Scientific Officer.

PTX-COVID19-B is a messenger RNA (mRNA)-based COVID-19 vaccine. In an interview with CTV news, Sorenson said they were "building some of the important building blocks for the messenger RNA ... that provides instructions to cells ... to build proteins that may treat or prevent disease".

As of January 2021, Northern RNA's Calgary lab was proposed as the site where manufacturing of PTX-COVID19-B would take place. Providence Therapeutics' partner, Northern RNA, which located at 421 7 Avenue SW in Calgary, has been described as Providence Therapeutics northern division.

A February 2021 Manitoba government press release said that the Winnipeg-based Emergent BioSolutions would be manufacturing the vaccine.

=== Clinical trials ===
Human trials began on January 26, 2021, with 60 volunteers between the ages of 18 and 65 in Toronto. Of these, 15 would receive a placebo and three groups of 15 would receive different doses of the vaccine. The volunteers will be monitored for 13 months. The company said that enough data would be available in May which could result in a Phase 2 clinical testing beginning soon after that, pending regulatory approval. If the results of a subsequent larger human trial are positive, the vaccine could enter a commercialization phase in 2022. The Phase 1 clinical trial lead was Piyush Patel. At the 29 April meeting with the House of Commons, Sorenson estimated that PTX-COVID19-B could be approved by Health Canada by "January or February 2022".

=== Provincial funding ===
Shortly after the first human trials on PTX-COVID19-B began in late January, on February 11, 2021, Manitoba Premier Brian Pallister announced a "term sheet" between the province and Providence Therapeutics through which Manitoba would receive 2 million doses of PTX-COVID19-B pending its approval by Health Canada. The term sheet includes "best-price guarantee" PTX-COVID19-B. According to a provincial statement released by the Manitoba government, pending approval of the vaccine, the actual manufacturing would take place in Winnipeg by Emergent BioSolutions. Pallister said that, "Building a secure, made-in-Canada vaccine supply will put Canadians at the head of the line to get a COVID vaccine, where we belong." The down payment would be 20% with a subsequent 40% to be paid when the vaccine was approved by Health Canada; the balance would be paid on delivery of the doses. Specifics about the contract were released in April 2021: the total cost was estimated as CAD$36 million and the agreement included a clause for a non-refundable advance payment of CAD$7.2 million. Sorenson made this comment to Global News: "Under no circumstances is Manitoba going to be on the hook for $7.2 million unless they get real value out of it".

=== Federal funding ===
Canada's National Research Council (NRC) provided Providence Therapeutics with CAD$5 million for the launch of January 2021 first phase of PTX-COVID19-B clinical trials.

As part of the federal government's "next generation manufacturing supercluster" program, Providence and Northern mRNA had also been "cleared to access up to $5 million" towards the manufacturing start up process, according to a federal government spokesperson. The CBC report in late April 2021 also stated that "it could be eligible for a slice of $113 million in additional funding from the National Research Council of Canada Industrial Research Assistance Program". The federal government had provided funding to some other companies in Canada that were also working to develop a COVID-19 vaccine.

Sorenson as Providence Therapeutics CEO posted an open letter to Prime Minister Justin Trudeau, in which he requested $CDN 150 million upfront to be used to pay for clinical trial and material costs.

On April 29, 2021, Sorenson appeared before the House of Commons standing committee on international trade, to ask the Minister of Procurement, Anita Anand, to consider PTX-COVID19-B as an alternative to Moderna and Pfizer for the "2022 booster vaccines". Sorenson said that the NRC had approached Providence Therapeutics in 2020 after the company had announced their Phase I trial PTX-COVID19-B. Sorenson told the Standing Committee that, "We've had really good dialogue ever since phase I started. That process has gone on. That started probably [in February], as we geared up to conclude our phase I trial and release data. Although the NRC is capped at $10 million, which is certainly not sufficient to carry out phase II and phase III trials, the NRC has, through the bureaucracy, elevated us back up to the strategic innovation fund. That occurred about three weeks ago. We're now working with the strategic innovation fund."

He later said that no reply had been received from the government.

In a meeting with the federal COVID-19 vaccine task force and Sorenson, task force members expressed concerns that "Providence might not be able to scale up production fast enough".
