= Ultragenyx =

American biopharmaceutical company

Ultragenyx Pharmaceutical Inc.
- Type: Public
- Traded as: Nasdaq: RARE; Russell 1000 component
- Industry: Biotechnology; Life Sciences
- Founded: 2010; 16 years ago
- Founder: Emil Kakkis
- Headquarters: Novato, California, U.S.
- Areas served: International
- Key people: Emil Kakkis (president)
- Products: Research Antibodies; Biotech
- Revenue: ▲US$271 million (2020)
- Number of employees: 1,371 (2025)
- Website: ultragenyx.com

Ultragenyx Pharmaceutical Inc. is an American biopharmaceutical company involved in the research and development of novel products for treatment of rare and ultra-rare genetic diseases for which there are typically no approved treatments and high unmet medical need. The company works with multiple drug modalities including biologics, small molecule, gene therapies, and ASO and mRNAs in the disease categories of bone, endocrine, metabolic, muscle and CNS diseases.

Ultragenyx is based in Novato, CA and Brisbane, CA and has a presence in the Boston area, including a gene therapy plant under construction as of 2021. The company’s Latin American headquarters is located in Miami.

Ultragenyx collaborates on product development with other companies including GeneTX, Kyowa Hakko Kirin, Mereo Biopharma and Daiichi Sankyo. Ultragenyx has three products Burosumab, Triheptanoin and Vestronidase alfa that have received FDA approval and several others currently in clinical trials. The company also holds the non-US commercial rights to Regeneron’s evinacumab-dgnb, which is approved by the FDA and EMA. The company also has therapies approved outside the U.S. in Canada, Latin America, Europe, and Japan.

In 2020 and 2021, Ultragenyx was named one of Deloitte's fastest growing technology and life sciences companies in North America and one of the best companies to work for by BioSpace. Also in 2021, the company’s CEO, Emil Kakkis, was awarded the California Life Sciences Pantheon Leadership award.

== History ==
Ultragenyx Pharmaceutical Inc. was founded in 2010 by Emil Kakkis based on his history of developing therapies for rare disease starting at Harbor-UCLA Medical Center, continuing through his role as chief medical officer of BioMarin and as founder of the EveryLife Foundation. He became the chief executive officer and president, focusing the company to meet the treatment needs for rare diseases understood as affecting fewer than 200,000 people in the U.S. In 2014 the USA-based company went public with an IPO that raised $126 million. In 2015 Ultragenyx began collaborating with Arcturus Therapeutics to develop mRNA products.

Ultragenyx acquired Dimension Therapeutics in 2017 to obtain adeno-associated virus (AAV)-based gene therapy manufacturing technology as well as three internal candidates and one partnered candidate with Bayer for hemophilia A.

In 2017, the company discontinued development of their Ace-ERs treatment for GNE myopathy after the product did not meet the study's primary endpoint, which was significant improvement in arm strength. It also failed to meet three secondary endpoints that evaluated patients' physical functions: leg muscle strength and knee extension force, which previous trials in mice had shown efficacy.

In 2020 Ultragenyx announced a new gene therapy plant being built near Boston.

In July 2022 Ultragenyx announced that it would exercise its option to acquire GeneTx Biotherapeutics for an up-front cash payment of $75 million, plus another $115 million in potential milestone-dependent payments. Ultragenyx will add the antisense oligonucleotide therapy GTX-102 to its broad pipeline of therapies indicated for various rare diseases. GTX-102 is currently in early-stage development for Angelman syndrome. The deal was completed in August 2022.

== Products ==
- Vestronidase alfa (brand name Mepsevii) was approved in November 2017 to treat children and adults with the inherited metabolic condition mucopolysaccharidosis type VII (MPS VII), also known as Sly syndrome.
- Burosumab (KRN-23; brand name Crysvita) was approved in 2018 by the FDA to treat X-linked hypophosphatemia. In 2020 the drug was approved to treat tumor-induced osteomalacia.
- Triheptanoin (brand name Dojolvi) a purified medium-chain triglyceride, was approved in 2020 for the treatment of long-chain fatty acid oxidation disorders in which the body is unable to produce energy from fat. Due to its odd-chain properties, Triheptanoin is broken down into metabolites that replace deficient intermediates in the Citric Acid Cycle. Trials on this drug as treatment for a different condition, Glut1 deficiency, a seizure disorder, were halted in 2017 due to a failure of a mid stage study.
- Evinacumab-dgnb (brand name Evkeeza) was approved in February 2021 for the treatment of homozygous familial hypercholesterolemia. Developed by Regeneron, Ultragenyx acquired the sales and development rights in 2022 in markets outside the United States.

== Pipeline ==
=== Biologic ===
- UX143 (Setrusumab) - under investigation for osteogenesis imperfecta, a rare genetic disease with no approved therapies.

=== Gene therapy ===
- DTX401 - in clinical development for glycogen storage disease type 1s (GSD1a).
- DTX301 - in clinical development for treatment of ornithine transcarbamylase (OTC) deficiency.
- DTX201/BAY 2599023 - in clinical development for treatment of hemophilia A.
- UX111 - in clinical development for treatment of Sanfilippo syndrome.
- UX701 - in clinical development for treatment of Wilson Disease.
- UX810 - in clinical development for treatment of Duchenne Muscular Dystrophy (DMD).

=== ASO/mRNA ===
- GTX-102 - in clinical development as a possible treatment option for Angelman syndrome, a rare, neurogenetic disorder.
- UX053 - in clinical development for glycogen storage disease type III (GSDIII).
