= COVID-19 vaccination in the Philippines =

Campaign to immunize the population of the Philippines from COVID-19

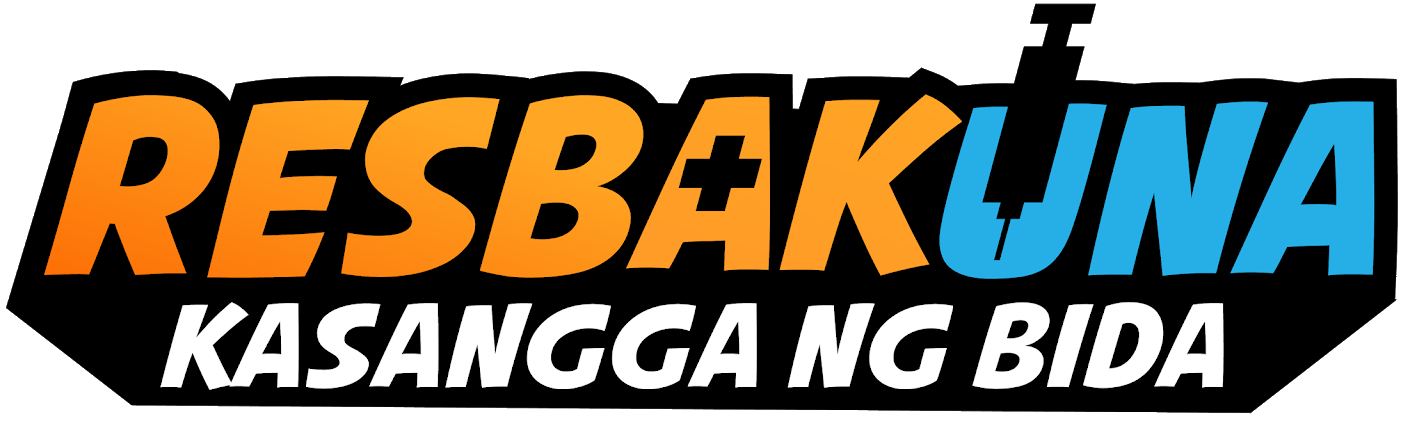
- Logo of Resbakuna, (Note: A portmanteau of Tagalog words resbak (wrest back; to retaliate or to avenge) and bakuna (vaccine); literally, "to take retaliate [on COVID-19] with a vaccine") the national COVID-19 vaccination campaign of the Philippines
- Date: March 1, 2021 – July 22, 2023
- Location: Philippines
- Cause: COVID-19 pandemic in the Philippines
- Target: Achieve herd immunity; Fully vaccinate 70% of the population (77.1 million) against COVID-19
- Organized by: Department of Health (DOH)
- Participants: 166,423,405 total doses administered (Note: 71,049,364 of these have been administered with the first dose of a two-dose vaccine or a single-dose vaccine, while 73,873,958 have been fully vaccinated with a two-dose or a single-dose vaccine while 21,500,083 have received booster doses.)
- Outcome: 65.16% of the Filipino population has received their first dose of a two-dose vaccine or a single-dose vaccine 67.75% has been fully vaccinated 19.72% have received booster doses
- Website: Department of Health

The COVID-19 vaccination program in the Philippines was a mass immunization campaign against severe acute respiratory syndrome coronavirus 2 (SARS-CoV-2), the virus that causes coronavirus disease 2019 (COVID-19), in response to the pandemic in the country. The vaccination program was initiated by the Duterte administration on March 1, 2021, a day after the arrival of the country's first vaccine doses which were donated by the Chinese government.

The Food and Drug Administration (FDA) has issued emergency use authorizations (EUA) to 10 COVID-19 vaccines (in chronological order): Pfizer–BioNTech, Oxford–AstraZeneca, Sinovac, Sputnik V, Janssen, Covaxin, Moderna, Sinopharm BIBP, Sputnik Light and Novavax.

As of February 19, 2023, 166,423,405 total vaccine doses have been administered throughout the country, with 73,873,958 being fully vaccinated, 21,500,083 booster doses administered.

== Background and timeline ==
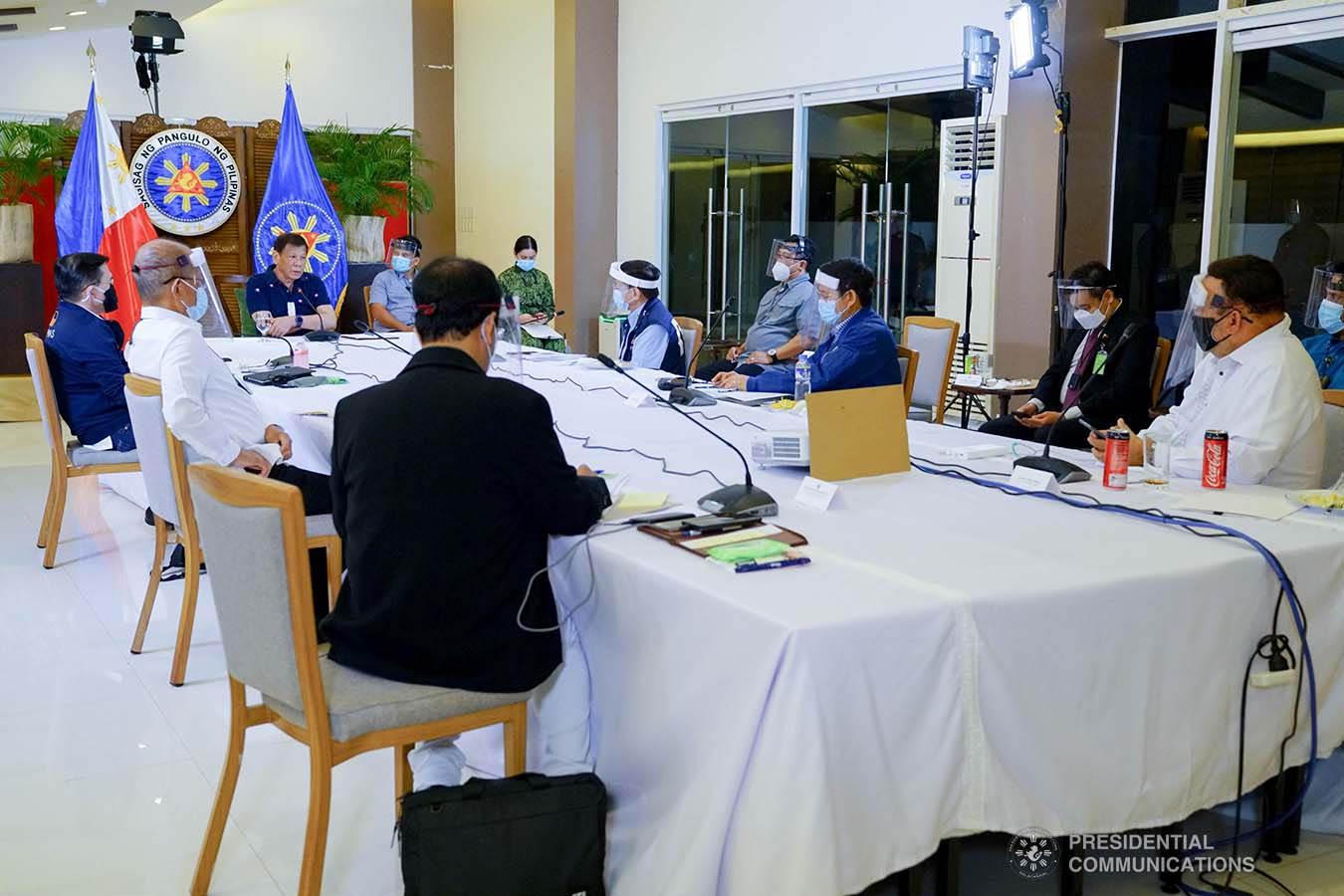
President Duterte during a meeting with members of the IATF-EID at the Matina Enclaves in Davao City in June 2020

The COVID-19 Immunization Program Management Organizational Structure was formed on October 26, 2020, to facilitate the distribution of COVID-19 vaccines in the Philippines, however this was replaced by a vaccine cluster within the Inter-Agency Task Force for the Management of Emerging Infectious Diseases (IATF-EID) by November 6, 2020. Carlito Galvez Jr. was appointed to lead the cluster under the title of vaccine czar. The Philippine National Vaccination Program and Implementation Plan was also approved by November 6, 2020.

=== Preparation ===
==== Organizations involved ====
The COVID-19 Immunization Program Management Organizational Structure was formed on October 26 with the intention of it overseeing the distribution of COVID-19 vaccines once these became available. However, by November 6, the vaccine body was abolished and replaced with a vaccine cluster within the National Task Force Against COVID-19 of the Inter-Agency Task Force for the Management of Emerging Infectious Diseases (IATF-EID). The vaccine cluster is distinct from the national task force's COVID-19 response cluster.

The Food and Drug Administration (FDA) on their part is the agency tasked to review and approve the use and commercial distribution of COVID-19 vaccines in the Philippines as well as the issuance of an emergency use authorization for the same.

==== Delivery plan ====
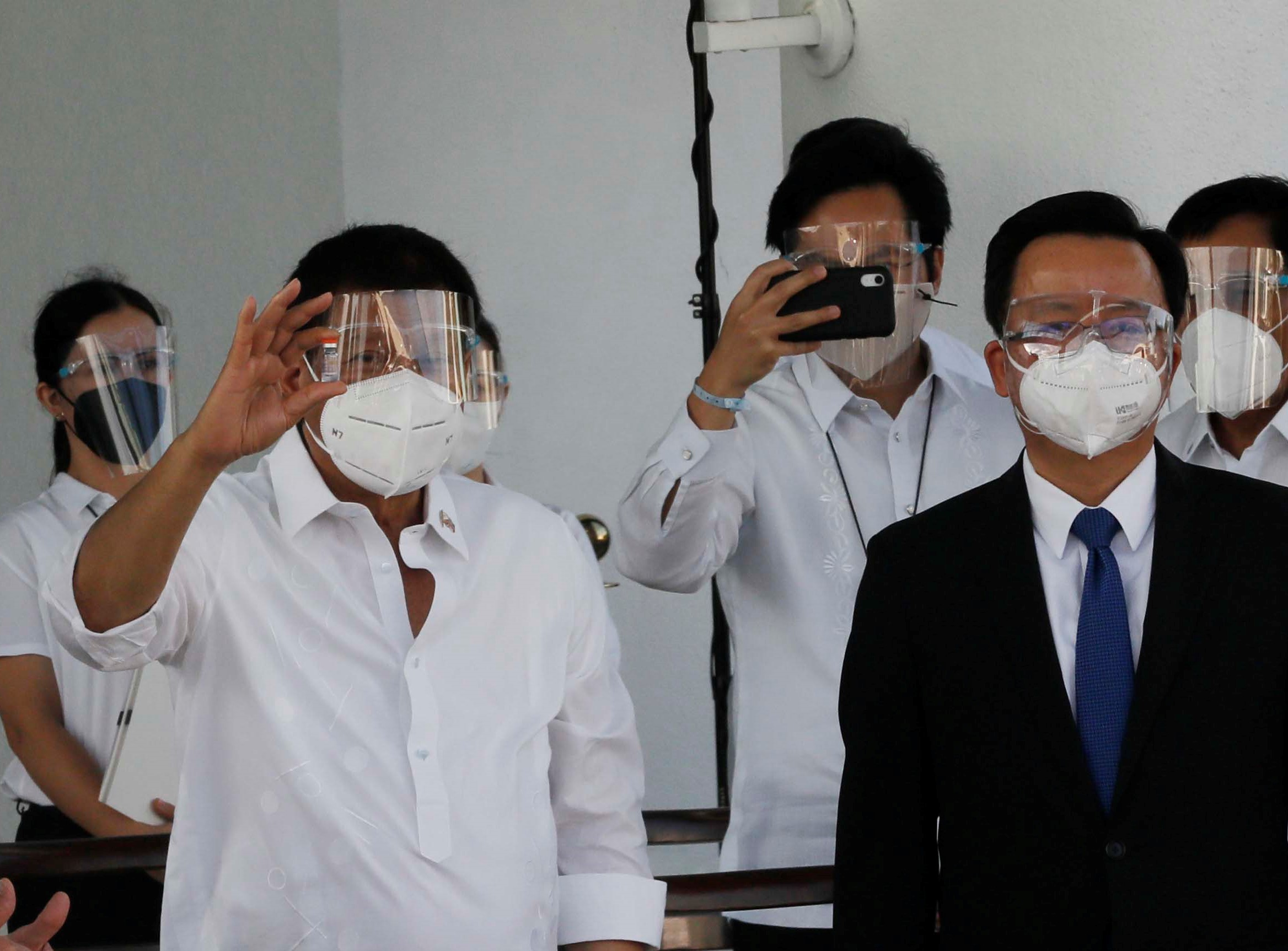
President Duterte and Chinese Ambassador Huang Xilian (right) during arrival of the 600,000 doses of China-donated CoronaVac vaccines at the Villamor Air Base in Pasay City in February 2021

The national government planned to roll out its vaccination program around February expecting the delivery of Pfizer's vaccines sourced from the COVAX facility and the first batch of Sinovac's vaccines, consisting of 50,000 doses. The delivery of Pfizer's vaccines was delayed due to documentary issues.

The government planned to start a full rollout or mass vaccination for the general populace around late 2021.

=== Regulatory approval ===
Under normal circumstances, drugs and vaccines are reviewed for approval by the Food and Drug Administration (FDA) under a period of six months. President Rodrigo Duterte to fast-track the government's medical response to the pandemic signed an executive order on December 2, 2020, which allowed the FDA to grant emergency-use authorization (EUA) to COVID-19 vaccines and treatments. An EUA for a particular vaccine would authorize the government to buy said vaccine and allow to use the same for the vaccination program. An EUA would not authorize the commercial use of such vaccines or consent the use of the vaccine for personal use.

The EUA approval process by the FDA is covered under FDA Circular No. 2020-036.

An EUA granted for COVID-19 vaccine or drug remains valid if it fulfills three conditions:

- Based on the totality of evidence including data from adequate and well-known controlled trials, it is reasonable to believe that the drug or vaccine may be effective to prevent, diagnose or treat COVID-19.
- The known and potential benefits of the drug or vaccine...outweigh the known and potential risks, if any.
- There is no adequate, approved, and available alternative to the drug or vaccine.

The EUAs validity ends one year from the lifting of the public health emergency status declared in response to the pandemic or one year from the date it was registered if a COVID-19 drug or vaccine gets fully registered with the FDA.

Among the conditions for a vaccine manufacturer to secure an EUA in the Philippines is to obtain prior EUA in its country of origin or other countries with a "mature" regulator. No manufacturer would be allowed to obtain an EUA in the Philippines first. For the purpose of the FDA's EUA approval process, the following foreign regulators are considered as "mature":

- Therapeutic Goods Administration (Australia)
- Pharmaceuticals and Medical Devices Agency (Japan)
- Ministry of Food and Drug Safety (South Korea)
- Health Canada
- Health Sciences Authority (Singapore)
- Swiss Agency for Therapeutic Products (Switzerland)
- Medicines and Healthcare products Regulatory Agency (United Kingdom)
- Food and Drug Administration (United States)
- European Medicines Agency (European Union)

==== Vaccine manufacturers applied for EUA ====
The FDA announced that three vaccine manufacturers namely Pfizer–BioNTech, AstraZeneca, and Sinovac have inquired on the process of obtaining an EUA in the Philippines.

=== Rollout ===
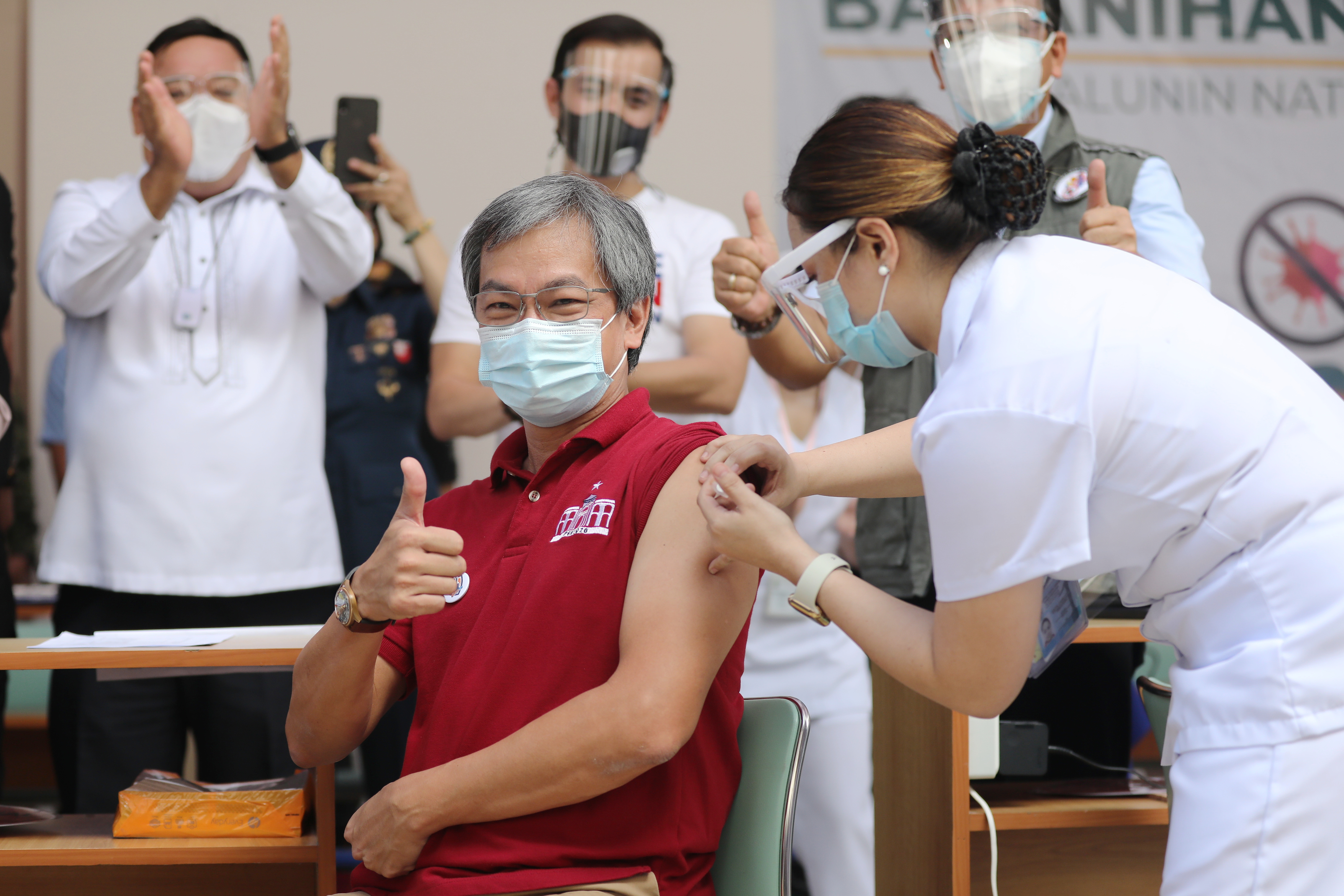
Dr. Gerardo Legaspi officially becomes the first recipient of a COVID-19 vaccine in the country on March 1, 2021

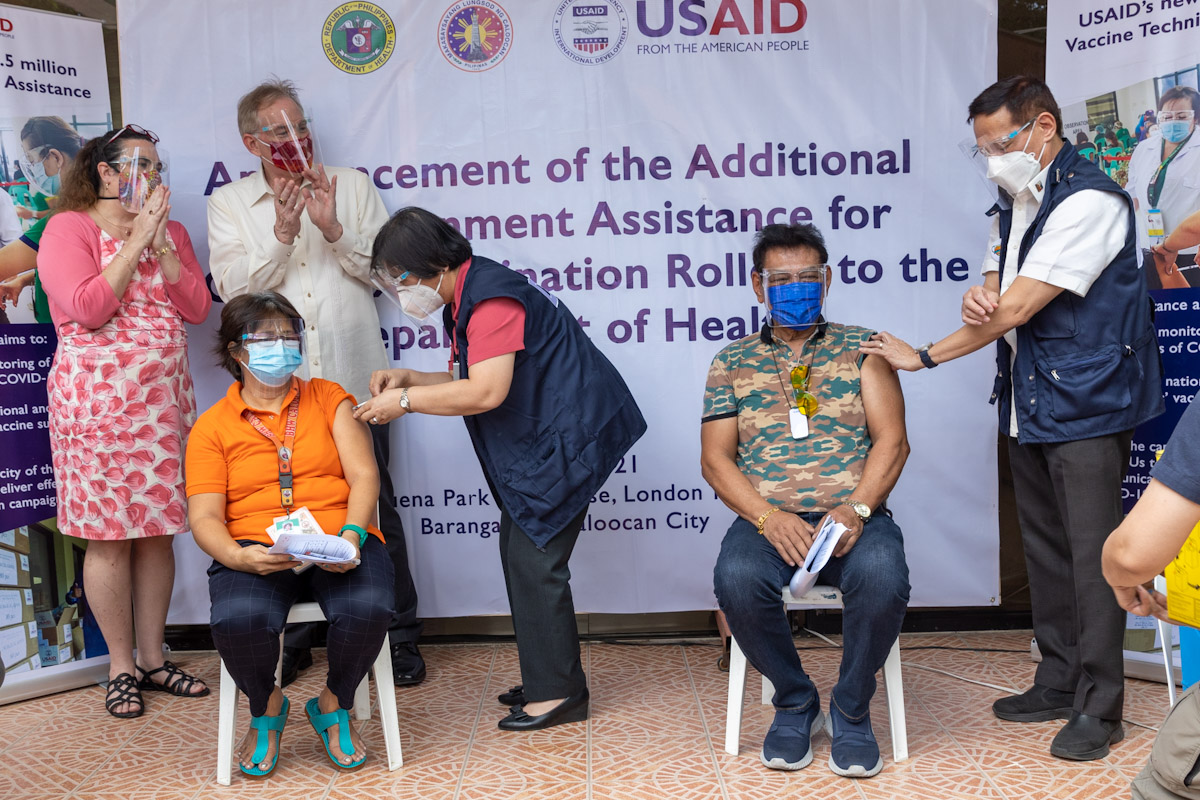
Vaccination site in Caloocan

The Philippines' vaccination officially began on March 1, 2021, shortly after the arrival of the first batch of vaccines from Sinovac. Prior to the official roll-out, a dry run was conducted to ensure that the vaccines, especially temperature-sensitive ones, would be rolled-out with minimal problems.

In February 2021, the Food and Drug Association recommended against the usage of Sinovac vaccines for health care workers due to its low efficacy rates in trials on health care workers in other countries. It has recommended its usage instead to the vaccine to the working population and military personnel.

The National Immunization Technical Advisory Group (NITAG) on February 26 has approved the use of the Sinovac vaccine to health care workers. Health care workers are still allowed to not take the vaccine and wait for a more effective vaccine. Philippine General Hospital (PGH) employees demanded for a better vaccine and an increase with their hazard pays.

At a press conference, Presidential Spokesperson Harry Roque stated that health care workers can refuse the Sinovac vaccine and wait for the vaccines from Pfizer–BioNTech, Moderna, and Oxford–AstraZeneca while still being prioritized but other prioritized groups shall only get what is available in their locality.

The rollout for the Philippines' national vaccine program began on March 1, 2021, shortly after the arrival of 600,000 doses of Sinovac's vaccine. Philippine General Hospital director and doctor Gerardo Legaspi officially became the first recipient of a COVID-19 vaccine in the country. The initial batch will cover around 50,000 military personnel and 250,000 health workers. As of March 3, 2021, vaccinations has been limited to Metro Manila and to health workers. However, select government officials were vaccinated in a bid to boost confidence on the vaccine.

On March 6, 2021, Oxford–AstraZeneca, under the COVAX facility, began the rollout. Health workers who refused Sinovac's vaccines were prioritized.

In May 2021, the rollout of vaccines from two manufacturers began. The rollout of the Sputnik V vaccines began on May 3 with five cities of Metro Manila; namely Makati, Manila, Taguig, Parañaque, and Muntinlupa. The deployment of Pfizer started on May 12, beginning in two cities in Metro Manila (San Juan and Makati). On June 30, 2021, the Moderna vaccine began its rollout in Metro Manila including San Juan. On July 20, 2021, the Janssen vaccine began being rolled out in Tacloban. On August 12, 2021, Vaccine Czar Carlito Galvez Jr. announced that recipients of the Sputnik V vaccine as their first dose can receive the AstraZeneca vaccine as their second dose provided that the shipment of Sputnik V is delayed due to logistical issues.

Vaccination of minors began in mid-October 2021. At that time, emergency use authorizations for the use of Moderna and Pfizer vaccines for minors (ages 12–15 for Pfizer; age 12-17 for Moderna) has been granted.

To hasten the immunization program, the government announced that it was holding "National Vaccination Days" on November 29 until December 1. November 29 and December 1 will be special working days. Initially targeted to immunize 15 million people, it was reduced to 9 million due to logistics issues surrounding the syringes for Pfizer vaccines.

== Issuance of vaccine certificates ==
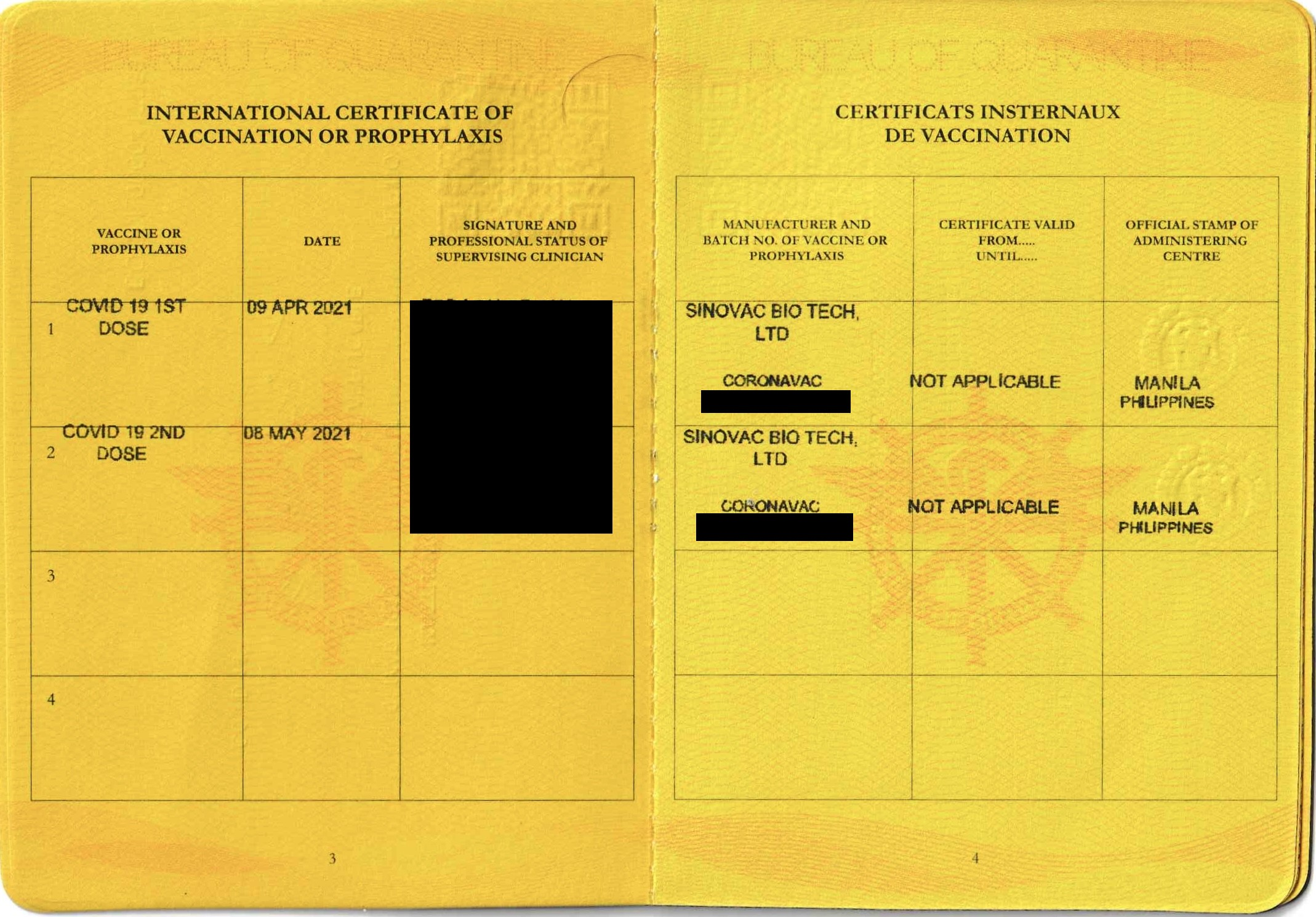
An International Certificate of Vaccination issued by the Bureau of Quarantine in the Philippines after being vaccinated with a COVID-19 vaccine in 2021.

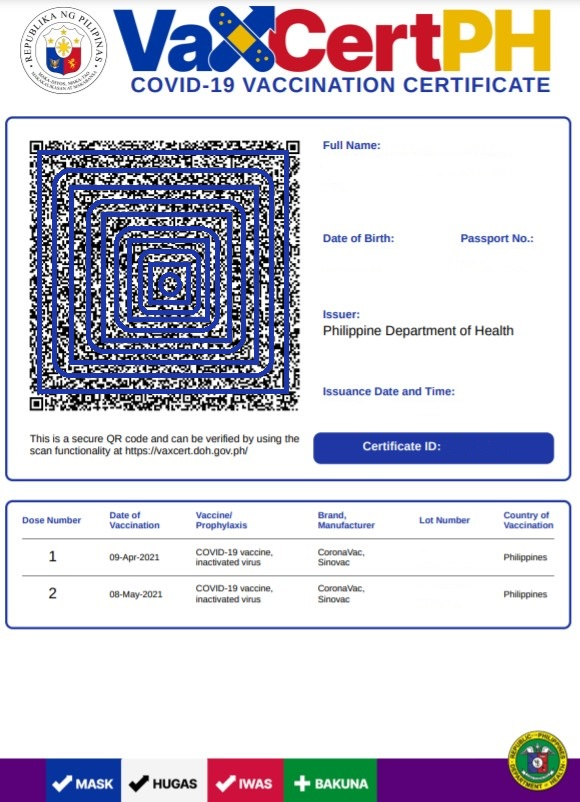
The VaxCERTPH COVID-19 Vaccination Certificate was issued by the Department of Health in the Philippines after receiving COVID-19 vaccination in 2021.

Upon being vaccinated with a COVID-19 vaccine, the local government unit (LGU) or recognized private healthcare providers issue a vaccine card that shall act as proof of vaccination. Later on, the Department of Information and Communications Technology (DICT) in coordination and the Department of Health along with the Inter-Agency Task Force for the Management of Emerging Infectious Diseases (IATF-EID) for a centralized registry for COVID-19 vaccinated residents under a common digital vaccine ID that shall feature a unique QR code.

Since September 6, 2021, the VaxCERTPH, the national digital COVID-19 vaccination certificate was launched to serve as the official COVID-19 vaccination certificate for international and domestic travel for fully vaccinated Philippine citizens and residents. The digital certificate is based on the international standards as prescribed by World Health Organization (WHO). Vaccination records for the VaxCERTPH certificate are based on the Vaccination Information Management System (VIMS), managed by the Department of Information and Communications Technology (DICT) based on the uploads by the local government units in the Philippines. In 2022, the VaxCERTPH has since updated vaccination certificates that would include additional booster shots.

At the same time since July 2021, the Bureau of Quarantine in the Philippines has begun issuing a new format of the International Certificate of Vaccination (ICV) to fully vaccinated Philippine citizens and residents for international travel provided that the COVID-19 vaccine is listed under the Emergency Use Listing (EUL) by the World Health Organization (WHO).

=== Recognition of vaccination certificates ===
On July 4, 2021, the Inter-Agency Task Force for the Management of Emerging Infectious Diseases (IATF) has permitted domestic travel within the Philippines for fully vaccinated individuals that have been vaccinated with a COVID-19 vaccine under the Emergency Use Listing (EUL) by the World Health Organization (WHO) or have been granted an emergency use authorization (EUA) or a compassionate special permit (CSP) issued by the Food and Drug Administration (FDA). The same rules applies for fully vaccinated international travelers from countries and territories deemed as "low-risk" and can receive a reduced quarantine period of seven days.

On October 8, 2021, the IATF introduced revised guidelines that fully vaccinated travelers from "low-risk" (green list) and "moderate-risk" (yellow list) jurisdictions can receive a reduced facility-based quarantine up to five days upon presentation of a national digital certificate issued by a foreign government with a reciprocal agreement with the Philippines.

On October 13, 2021, the IATF subsequently permitted the entry of fully vaccinated travelers from "low-risk" (green list) countries and jurisdictions to skip facility-based quarantine provided there is a presentation of negative RT-PCR test result within 72 hours before departure from their country. This policy was later to the presentation of a negative RT-PCR test result within 48 hours before departure from their country.

The Philippines presently recognizes the vaccination certificates issued by the following countries: Albania, Armenia, Argentina, Azerbaijan, Australia, Austria, Bahrain, Belgium, Brazil, Brunei, Cambodia, Canada, Chile, Colombia, Czech Republic, Denmark, Ecuador, Egypt, Estonia, France, Georgia, Germany, Greece, Hong Kong, India, Indonesia, Iraq, Ireland, Israel, Italy, Japan, Kazakhstan, Kuwait, Macau, Malaysia, Maldives, Malta, Myanmar, Monaco, the Netherlands, New Zealand, Oman, Palau, Papua New Guinea, Peru, Portugal, Qatar, Samoa, Singapore, Slovenia, Spain, Syria, Switzerland, South Korea, Sri Lanka, Thailand, Timor–Leste, Tunisia, Turkey, the United Arab Emirates, the United Kingdom, the United States, Uruguay, and Vietnam.

=== Booster shots ===
The Health Technology Assessment Council (HTAC), the independent advisory council issued its recommendation for the administering of a third dose of the COVID-19 vaccine as a booster shot with a priority towards health care workers and other priority groups.

Booster shots were rolled for frontline healthcare workers on November 16, 2021. Similarly, the IATF has approved the administration of booster shots for Overseas Filipino Workers who are set for deployment within four months provided their second dosage was taken six months prior. Senior citizens and immunocompromised persons were rolled out on November 22, 2021. These groups can choose their preferred vaccine brand in comparison to their primary series.

On December 3, 2021, the Philippine Department of Health announces the expansion of the booster shot program stating all adults aged 18 years and above can receive additional booster shots at least six months from the primary series or three months after receiving the single-dose Janssen COVID-19 vaccine.

Due to the threat of the SARS-CoV-2 Omicron variant, the Department of Health announced on December 22, 2021, the shortening of the interval of the booster doses for all adults aged 18 years and above at three months from their primary series or two months after receiving the single-dose Janssen vaccine.

== Vaccine supply ==
=== Summary ===
Summary of vaccine procurement, donation processing, and approval (by the national government)
| Vaccine | Manufacturer | Progress | Doses ordered | Doses arrived (including donations and from COVAX Facility) | Sourced from donations (including pledges and from COVAX Facility) | EUA Approval | Full Approval | Deployment |
|---|---|---|---|---|---|---|---|---|
| Pfizer–BioNTech | (United States) (Germany) Pfizer and BioNTech | phase III clinical trials | 40 million | 63,730,020 | 23,728,890 (COVAX) | January 14, 2021 | No full authorization application submitted | May 12, 2021 |
| Oxford–AstraZeneca | (United Kingdom) (Sweden) University of Oxford and AstraZeneca | phase III clinical trials | 17 million | 36,969,350 | 15,530,100 (COVAX) 6,797,650 (donation) | January 28, 2021 | No full authorization application submitted | March 6, 2021 |
| Sinovac Coronavac | (China) Sinovac Biotech | phase III clinical trials | 45 million | 56,030,400 | 4,000,000 (donation) | February 22, 2021 | No full authorization application submitted | March 1, 2021 |
| Sputnik V | (Russia) Gamaleya Research Institute of Epidemiology and Microbiology | phase III clinical trials | 10 million | 10,000,000 | 15,000 | March 19, 2021 | No full authorization application submitted | May 3, 2021 |
| Covaxin | (India) Bharat Biotech | phase III clinical trials | 8 million | – | – | April 19, 2021 (Note: A "Conditional" EUA was granted on this date, with Bharat Biotech required to submit a Good Manufacturing Practice certification before distributing the vaccines. A "Full" EUA was then granted on June 21.) | No full authorization application submitted | Pending |
| Janssen | (United States) (Belgium) (Netherlands) Janssen | phase III clinical trials | 5 million (COVAX cost-sharing) 6 million (under negotiations) | 12,725,650 | 12,725,650 (COVAX) | April 19, 2021 | No full authorization application submitted | July 20, 2021 |
| Moderna | (United States) Moderna | phase III clinical trials | 20 million | 33,095,100 | 12,945,660 (COVAX) 249,600 | May 5, 2021 | No full authorization application submitted | June 30, 2021 |
| Sinopharm BIBP | (China) Sinopharm and Beijing Institute of Biological Products | phase III clinical trials | 10 million (under negotiations) | 1,100,000 | 1,100,000 (donation) | June 7, 2021 | No full authorization application submitted | August 20, 2021 |
| Sinopharm WIBP | (China) Sinopharm and Wuhan Institute of Biological Products | phase III clinical trials | – | – | – | August 19, 2021 | No full authorization application submitted | Pending |
| Sputnik Light | (Russia) Gamaleya Research Institute of Epidemiology and Microbiology | phase III clinical trials | – | 5,000 | 5,000 (donation) | August 20, 2021 | No full authorization application submitted | November 2021 |
| Covovax | (United States) Serum Institute of India and Novavax | phase III clinical trials | 10 million (under negotiations) | – | – | November 17, 2021 | No full authorization application submitted | Pending |
| Corbevax | (India) Biological E. Limited | phase III clinical trials | – | – | – | No EUA application submitted | No full authorization application submitted | Pending |
| Arcturus | (United States) (Singapore) Arcturus Therapeutics | phase II clinical trials | – | – | – | No EUA application submitted | No full authorization application submitted | Pending |
| Clover | (China) Clover Biopharmaceuticals | phase III clinical trials | – | – | – | No EUA application submitted | No full authorization application submitted | Pending |
| EuBiologics | (South Korea) EuBiologics Co | phase I/II clinical trials | – | – | – | No EUA application submitted | No full authorization application submitted | Pending |

=== By acquisition ===
==== Vaccines on order ====
===== By the national government =====
The Philippine government has been negotiating with various foreign vaccine manufacturers to secure the country's COVID-19 vaccine supply. These manufacturers include Sinovac Biotech (China), Gamaleya Research Institute of Epidemiology and Microbiology (Russia), Moderna (United States), and Pfizer (United States). The private sector, with government sanction, has secured at least 2.6 million vaccine doses from British-Swedish manufacturer AstraZeneca. The government also has secured 10 million doses from American firm Novavax which would be supplied from the Serum Institute of India.

The government plans to secure 171 million doses from at least seven firms by the end of 2021. The procurement efforts of the national government have been a subject of various controversies.

The national government through the Department of Foreign Affairs responding to the request of Germany and the United Kingdom to be exempted from the Philippines' prevailing cap on the deployment of nurses abroad in exchange for vaccines. The United Kingdom declined the offer refusing to link the vaccines to negotiations on the deployment of Filipino health workers to their country. The proposal was also opposed by labor group Migrante International.

The Philippine government is negotiating with four pharmaceutical firms for the supply of COVID-19 booster shots.

===== By local governments =====
Local government units in the Philippines, from individual municipalities and cities and provinces has allocated part of their budgets to procure their own supply of COVID-19 vaccines.

Along with private companies, local governments had to procure vaccines through cooperation with the national government which led to some members of the Congress questioning urging the national government to allow local governments to procure vaccines unilaterally. However, the government pointed out that only national governments could directly procure vaccines through the World Health Organization's COVAX facility and that third-party private firms and local governments had to sign a tripartite deal with the national government and member vaccine manufacturer.

==== Vaccines sourced from donations ====
The first vaccines acquired by the Philippine national government was from Sinovac. The first batch of Sinovac's vaccines consisting of 600,000 doses were received by the Philippines on February 28, 2021, with the country expected to receive a total of 26 million doses. Vaccines sourced through the COVAX facility is also funded through donations by foreign countries. The IATF-EID approved the Philippines' participation in COVAX on July 24, 2020. The country is the recipient of vaccines from Pfizer–BioNTech and Oxford–AstraZeneca through the platform.

The Philippines also engaged in talks with Israel to obtain a possible donation of excess vaccines from the Middle Eastern country.

The Philippines has received 1,124,100 Oxford–AstraZeneca COVID-19 vaccine donations from Japan on July 8.

The Philippines has received about 3,239,400 Janssen COVID-19 vaccine donations from the United States on July 16–17 through COVAX.

The Philippines has received 415,040 Oxford–AstraZeneca COVID-19 vaccine doses donations from the United Kingdom on August 2.

The Philippines has received 3,000,060 Moderna COVID-19 vaccine donations from the United States on August 3 through COVAX.

The Philippines has received 100,000 doses of the Sinopharm BIBP vaccine from the United Arab Emirates.

The Philippines has received a donation of about 1,000,000 doses of the Sinopharm BIBP vaccine on August 20–21 from China.

The Philippines has expressed its intent to get some of Canada's COVID-19 vaccines.

==== Local production ====
Five local firms are in negotiations with foreign organizations to set up vaccine manufacturing sites in the Philippines as of March 2021. The origin of these foreign organization include China, India, South Korea, Russia, and the United States. South Korean firm EU Biologics has a partnership with Philippine vaccine distributor Glovax Biotech Corp. since 2012. The two companies plan to set-up their own vaccine production hub in Clark. Other interested foreign parties include the Gamaleya Research Institute of Epidemiology and Microbiology of Russia and a university research unit based in the United States.

Philippine company United Laboratories launched a program known as "Vaccine Self Reliant Philippines" which includes plans to set up a vaccine manufacturing plant by 2023.

=== By vaccine ===
==== Pfizer–BioNTech ====
The delivery of Pfizer–BioNTech COVID-19 vaccines to the Philippines has been subject to delays. Health Secretary Francisco Duque has been alleged to have "dropped the ball" on a Pfizer vaccine deal which could have secured 10 million doses by as early as January 2021. On June 19, the Philippine government has signed an agreement for the procurement of 40 million doses of Pfizer-BioNTech vaccine.

The first batch of the Pfizer vaccine, consisting of 193,050 doses through the COVAX facility, arrived on May 10. 2,279,160 additional doses arrived in the country from COVAX's facility on June 10.

The first batch of procured Pfizer–BioNTech vaccine, consisting of 562,770 doses, arrived on July 21.

==== Oxford–AstraZeneca ====
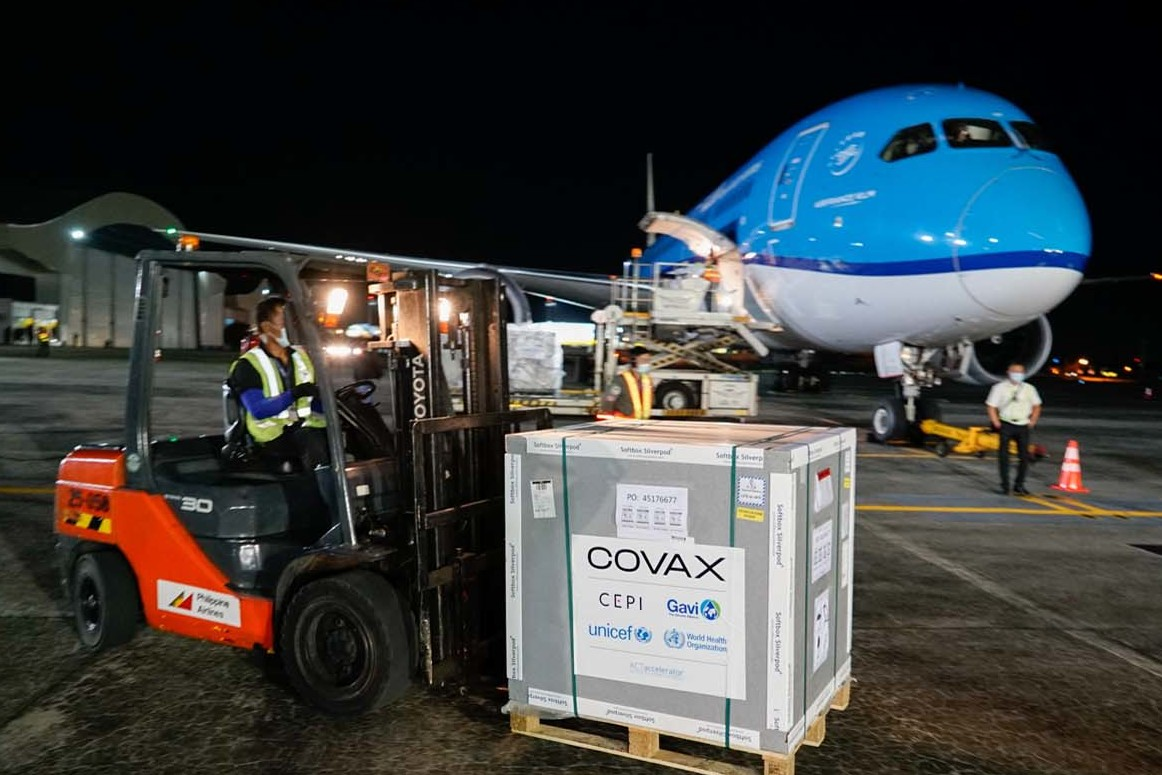
A worker unloading the shipment from COVAX at Villamor Air Base in Pasay on March 4, 2021

On January 14, the Philippines has secured 17 million doses of coronavirus disease 2019 (COVID-19) vaccines from British-Swedish pharmaceutical and biopharmaceutical firm AstraZeneca.

A shipment of 487,200 Oxford–AstraZeneca COVID-19 vaccines under COVAX's facility arrived in the country on March 4, 2021. An additional shipment of 38,400 doses arrived in the country on March 7, totalling a number of 525,600 doses from COVAX's facility. 2 million additional doses arrived in the country from COVAX's facility on May 8.

The first batch of procured Oxford–AstraZeneca vaccine, consisting of 1,150,800 doses, arrived on July 16.

==== Sinovac ====
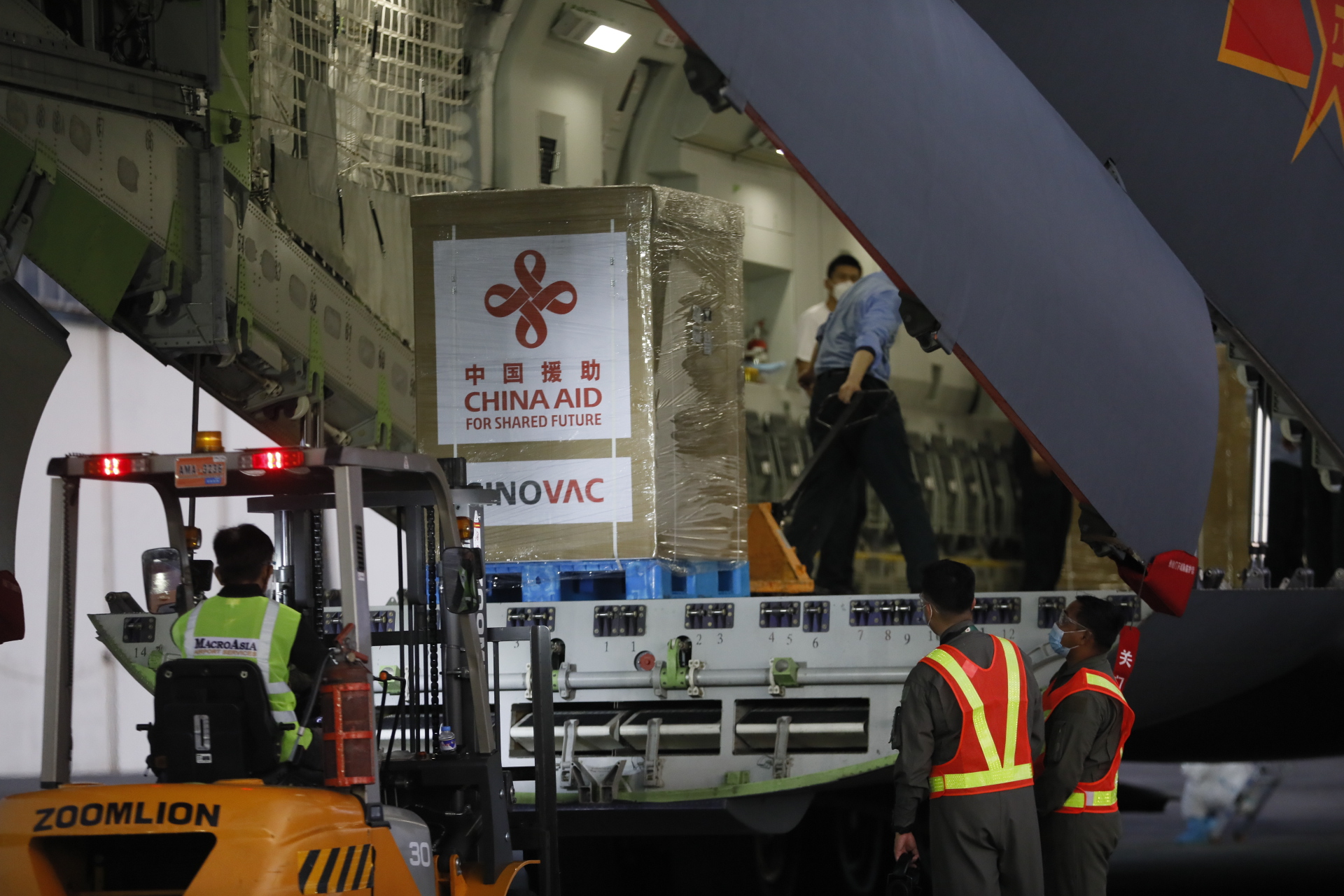
A Chinese military transport vehicle dropping off Sinovac's "CoronaVac" in Villamor Air Base in preparation for the mass vaccination in the Philippines

Plans to secure 36 million doses from China's Sinovac have also been subjected to scrutiny in Congress due to its reported efficacy rate. The efficacy rate of the Sinovac vaccine has varied by country; Turkey has reported an efficacy rate of 91% while Brazil has reported an efficacy rate of 78%. The Department of Health said that Sinovac's vaccine satisfy the World Health Organization standards of at least 50 percent efficacy rate while the FDA pointed out that Sinovac is yet to publish an official and published scientific report on their vaccines efficacy rate and that the clinical trial for the vaccine is conducted in different countries and the efficacy rate per country will vary. Following the approval for emergency use authorization on February 22, the first batch of Sinovac vaccines, consisting of 600,000 doses, from China's donation to the country arrived on February 28.

The first batch of procured vaccines by the government reached the Philippines on March 29 came from Sinovac with previous received vaccines coming from donations.

On August 24, the government bought additional 10 million doses from Sinovac.

==== Sputnik V ====
Russia commits to deliver the first doses of Gamaleya's Sputnik V COVID-19 vaccine to the Philippines around April 2021. The Philippines and Russia are also negotiating regarding a plan to set up a production facility for Sputnik V vaccines in the Philippines. The first batch of Gamaleya's vaccine, consisting of 15,000 doses, arrived on May 1.

==== Janssen ====
The first batch of Janssen COVID-19 vaccine under COVAX's facility from US donation, consisting of 1,606,600 doses, arrived on July 16, 2021. An additional shipment of 1,632,800 doses arrived on July 17.

The procurement of Janssen COVID-19 vaccines are still under negotiations.

==== Moderna ====
In early March 2021, the Philippine government secured 20 million doses of Moderna's COVID-19 vaccine through a tripartite agreement with Moderna and the private sector led by businessman Enrique Razon. The first batch of Moderna's vaccine, consisting of 249,600 doses, arrived on June 27. More shipments are expected in July and August 2021.

==== Sinopharm ====
The first batch of the Sinopharm BIBP vaccine under the brand name Hayat-Vax arrived on August 11, consisting of 100,000 doses, donated by the United Arab Emirates. Another batch of the Sinopharm BIBP vaccine arrived on August 20–21, consisting of 1,000,000 doses, donated by China.

The procurement of the Sinopharm vaccines are still under negotiations.

==== Sputnik Light ====
The first batch of Sputnik Light COVID-19 vaccine arrived on November 19, consisting of 5,000 doses, donated by Russia.

==== Novavax ====
On March 16, 2021, Philippine vaccine czar Carlito Galvez Jr. announced a purchase agreement for the Novavax vaccine of 30 million doses for the national vaccination program that shall be produced by the Serum Institute of India, being the first Southeast Asian country to procure the said vaccine.

== Progress to date ==
=== By region ===
Vaccines administered by region
| Region | First Dose (Note: For 2-dose vaccines.) | Vaccinated | Fully Vaccinated | Percentage | Booster Doses | Total |
|---|---|---|---|---|---|---|
| Metro Manila | 12,942,855 | 95.98% | 12,798,390 | 94.91% | 5,372,666 | 30,073,365 |
| Cordillera Administrative Region | 1,139,912 | 63.41% | 1,252,994 | 69.7% | 376,548 | 2,682,553 |
| Ilocos Region | 3,669,482 | 69.22% | 3,900,350 | 73.58% | 1,492,868 | 8,345,074 |
| Cagayan Valley | 2,576,249 | 69.9% | 2,635,605 | 71.51% | 874,502 | 5,647,989 |
| Central Luzon | 8,196,165 | 65.98% | 8,697,456 | 70.02% | 2,817,537 | 19,226,650 |
| Calabarzon | 10,165,009 | 62.77% | 10,782,603 | 66.58% | 3,338,120 | 23,376,796 |
| Mimaropa | 1,594,687 | 49.39% | 1,774,627 | 54.97% | 227,770 | 3,498,483 |
| Bicol Region | 3,447,527 | 56.68% | 3,633,156 | 59.73% | 660,727 | 7,343,888 |
| Western Visayas | 4,715,736 | 59.28% | 5,311,476 | 66.77% | 972,635 | 10,692,263 |
| Central Visayas | 4,684,805 | 57.97% | 4,807,154 | 59.48% | 968,771 | 10,187,195 |
| Eastern Visayas | 2,829,960 | 62.23% | 2,885,980 | 63.47% | 553,070 | 5,909,671 |
| Zamboanga Peninsula | 2,289,200 | 59.07% | 2,373,310 | 61.24% | 602,727 | 4,872,293 |
| Northern Mindanao | 3,252,825 | 64.76% | 3,286,899 | 65.44% | 960,258 | 6,935,116 |
| Davao Region | 3,325,610 | 63.42% | 3,350,804 | 63.9% | 692,260 | 7,027,089 |
| Soccsksargen | 2,583,189 | 59.23% | 2,598,514 | 59.59% | 470,911 | 5,252,070 |
| Caraga | 1,672,359 | 59.63% | 1,768,021 | 63.04% | 410,928 | 3,546,095 |
| Bangsamoro | 1,850,124 | 37.42% | 1,913,074 | 38.69% | 448,727 | 3,393,232 |
| Total | 71,016,826 | 65.13% | 73,846,910 | 67.73% | 21,392,812 | 166,256,348 |
(Data as of February 5, 2023)

== Vaccination priority groups ==
The Philippine government released a priority groups list for the national vaccination program in February 2021 as approved by the Interim National Immunization Technical Advisory Group. The list include three main categorizations, with utmost priority provided for populations under "A" categorization. As of February 2022, people under priority groups A1 to A5, the rest of adult population and minors (ages 5 to 17 years old) are being allowed to receive vaccination.

Vaccination priorities
| Category | Priority group |
|---|---|
| A1 | Frontline workers in health facilities both national and local, private and public, health professionals and non-professionals like students, nursing aides, janitors, barangay officials and health workers, and outbound Overseas Filipino Workers (since May 27, 2021) |
| A1.5 | City and Municipal Mayors, BARMM Chief Minister, BARMM Wa'lī, and Provincial Governors (Pursuant to IATF Resolution #: 115B-2021) |
| A2 | Senior citizens aged 60 and above |
| A3 | Persons with comorbidities not otherwise included in the preceding categories |
| A4 | Frontline personnel in essential sectors including uniformed personnel and those in working sectors identified by the IATF as essential during ECQ; local executives (Note: Local executives (governors, mayors, and barangay captains) were considered as frontline personnel) (since March 19, 2021), judiciary employees (since April 5, 2021), Filipino seafarers (since April 12, 2021) BPO employees and COMELEC employees (since May 21, 2021) Olympic coaches, athletes, and delegates (since May 22, 2021) private sector workers, government employees, informal sector workers, and self-employed (since May 27, 2021), workers in the entertainment and media industry (since June 7, 2021) |
| A5 | Indigent population not otherwise included in the preceding categories, homeless population and beneficiaries of the government's Pantawid Pamilyang Pilipino Program (4P's). |
| B1 | Teachers, social workers |
| B2 | Other government workers |
| B3 | Other essential workers (e.g. grocery store workers, bank workers, retail workers, mall workers) |
| B4 | Socio-demographic groups at significantly higher risk other than senior citizens and indigent people (e.g. persons deprived of liberty, persons with disabilities, Filipinos living in high-density areas) |
| B5 | Overseas Filipino Workers |
| B6 | Other remaining workforce |
| C | Rest of the Filipino population not otherwise included in the above groups, including minors aged 5 to 17 years old. |

=== Changes and additions ===
- March 19, 2021 – Local executives (provincial governors, city and municipal mayors, and barangay captains) are reclassified as essential workers or under the A4 category.
- March 29, 2021 – Specific comorbidities defined for category A3. People with the identify comorbidities are prioritized for vaccination over people with other comorbidities not specified.
- April 5, 2021 – Inclusion of judiciary employees under A4 category.
- April 12, 2021 – 13 Essential workers sub-groups under A4 category defined. This include elevation of Filipino seafarers to A4 category from either B3 (other essential workers) or B5 (overseas Filipino workers) categories. Applies to both seafarers working domestically and those deployed overseas.
- May 21, 2021 – Front line employees in the BPO industry and in the Commission on Elections (COMELEC) added to the A4 category.
- May 22, 2021 – Olympic coaches, athletes, and delegates added to the A4 category.
- May 27, 2021 – Included in A1 Category are outbound Overseas Filipino Workers and included in A4 category are private sector employees, government employees (including GOCCs and LGUs), and informal sector employees and self-employed individuals.
- June 7, 2021 – Workers in the entertainment industry particularly hosts, media practitioners, actors, and production crew were added to the A4 category.
- October 15, 2021 – Pediatric vaccination under A3 (12 to 17 years old with comorbidities).
- November 3, 2021 – Expansion of the pediatric vaccination to the general adolescent population under priority group C (12 to 17 years old without comorbidities).
- February 7, 2022 – Expansion of the pediatric vaccination to the general adolescent population under priority group C (5 to 11 years old).

== Controversies ==
=== Black market ===
In January 2021, during the time when only the Pfizer–BioNTech vaccine had an emergency use authorization, it was reported that an alleged black market of smuggled vaccines from China has established itself in the Philippines. The demand for the vaccines is particularly high for Chinese nationals in the country, especially those employed by Philippine Offshore Gaming Operators (POGOs). The doses are reportedly sold at inflated prices, considerably more expensive than the standard price of the same vaccines in China.

In late March 2021, the FDA released an advisory cautioning the public against fake vaccines and that vaccines which had emergency use authorization are not authorized to be sold commercially. Although as of that date, there are no reports yet of fake vaccines proliferating in the country as per the FDA.

=== Line jumping ===
The DOH reported in March 2021 that a number of individuals had jumped the line to get the vaccine, becoming vaccinated despite being otherwise ineligible to do so. These include several local government officials, prompting the Department of the Interior and Local Government (DILG) to issue show cause orders against them to explain why they were vaccinated, and actor Mark Anthony Fernandez, who was vaccinated despite not belonging to a priority group for the vaccine. Fernandez, for his part, claimed that he had underlying health conditions that otherwise made him eligible.

The issue has raised the concerns of the Commission on Human Rights, and has also led to the WHO warning the Philippine government that it risks losing access to its share of vaccines provided by COVAX if the practice continues.

A number of suggestions were floated to address line jumping, with Senator Franklin Drilon urging the government to ramp up the country's vaccine supply, and Representative Precious Hipolito, who represents the second district of Quezon City, filing a bill that would amend the Philippines' COVID-19 vaccination law to criminalize the practice.

=== Vaccination of the Presidential Security Group and President Duterte ===
In 2020, members of the Presidential Security Group (PSG), Cabinet officials, a senator, and the Special Envoy for Public Diplomacy to China received vaccines without clearance from the Food and Drug Administration (FDA) or the Department of Health (DOH).

Duterte said in December 2020 that some members of the military received COVID-19 vaccine from Chinese manufacturer Sinopharm despite the vaccine not yet officially approved by the country's health authorities. A few days later, it was reported that some members of the PSG had also received vaccines from an unknown manufacturer. Defense Secretary Delfin Lorenzana said that the vaccine used by the security group were smuggled. Brig. Gen. Jesus Durante III said that members of the PSG were vaccinated as early as September 2020 and Duterte said that PSG personnel administered the vaccines themselves. Presidential Spokesperson Harry Roque urged the public to "just accept" that some soldiers have received COVID-19 vaccines. On December 28, the Armed Forces of the Philippines said that the PSG members were the first ones to be vaccinated to "protect" Duterte.

On December 29, FDA Director General Enrique Domingo said that the DOH and the FDA were not consulted over the inoculation of soldiers and other government officials. On December 30, Durante said that he will take "full responsibility" for the vaccine administered to the PSG.

In 2021, criminal investigations and hearings were ordered by the National Bureau of Investigation, the FDA, and the Philippine Senate over alleged irregularities with the vaccinations.

On January 4, 2021, Duterte ordered the PSG to either not attend any congressional meeting regarding the unauthorized vaccination or stay quiet during such a hearing, contradicting the Presidential Spokesperson who said that the PSG will submit to any investigation. On January 5, despite Duterte's threat of a potential "crisis" if senators questioned his military bodyguards, the Senate opened an investigation for the unauthorized use of COVID-19 vaccines. On January 6, Senator Sherwin Gatchalian said he found nothing wrong with giving vaccines to PSG members since they were considered frontliners, though he acknowledged and took issue with the fact that the vaccines were brought into the country illegally.

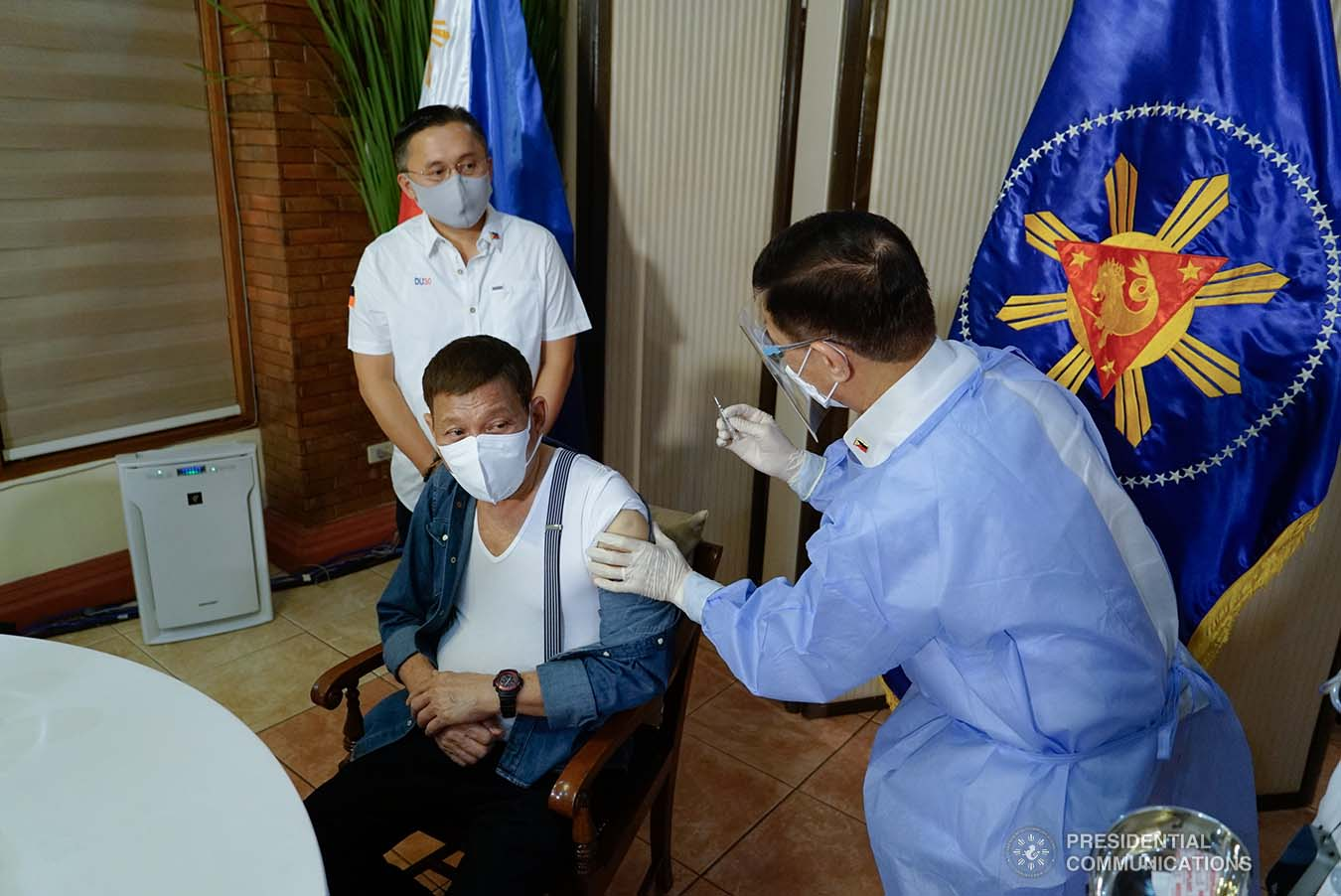
Health Secretary Francisco Duque III administering the Sinopharm BIBP vaccine to President Rodrigo Duterte in May 2021

On May 3, 2021, President Rodrigo Duterte received his first dose of the Sinopharm BIBP vaccine despite the latter not receiving an EUA from FDA. The FDA only issued a one-time compassionate special permit (CSP) for 10,000 doses of the vaccine for the PSG.

But due to public outrage, President Duterte apologized for taking the vaccine that has not been authorized by the FDA for emergency use and asked the Chinese Embassy to take back its donation.

=== Non-recognition of vaccine certificates by Hong Kong ===
Foreign Affairs Secretary Teodoro Locsin Jr. announced the Government of Hong Kong will not honor the proof of vaccination issued by local government units and the Bureau of Quarantine in the Philippines due to a lack of a central registry. This was after several Overseas Filipino Worker (OFWs) bound for the territory were reported to have been refused entry due to non-recognition of their vaccine certificates.

As an interim solution, the Department of Health confirmed that all outbound travelers would use the International Certificate of Vaccination (ICV) issued by the Bureau of Quarantine as an official proof of vaccination for international travel better known as the "yellow card".

On August 22, 2021, the Department of Labor and Employment announced that the Government of Hong Kong will permit the entry of fully vaccinated Filipino workers into the territory upon the presentation of the International Certificate of Vaccination issued by the Bureau of Quarantine (BOQ) beginning on August 30, 2021.

=== US disinformation campaign ===
A Reuters investigation found that the United States Department of Defense (DoD) undertook a disinformation campaign in the Philippines from 2020 to 2021 which sought to discredit China, in particular its Sinovac vaccine. The campaign reportedly aimed to counter "China's COVID diplomacy and propaganda." The campaign was overseen by Special Operations Command Pacific as well as the United States Central Command. Military personnel based in Tampa, Florida operated phony accounts on Facebook, Instagram, and X (formerly Twitter), some of which were more than five years old according to Reuters. During the COVID-19 pandemic, they disseminated hashtags of #ChinaIsTheVirus and posts claiming that the Sinovac vaccine contained gelatin from pork and therefore was haram or forbidden for purposes of Islamic law. US diplomats aware of the campaign were against the idea, but they were overruled by the military, which also asked tech companies not to take down the content after it was discovered by Facebook and X. A retrospective review by the DoD subsequently uncovered other social and political messaging that was "many leagues away" from acceptable military objective. The primary defence contractor on the project was General Dynamics IT, which received $493 million for its role. The military-run accounts had tens of thousands of followers. It is currently unknown how many people might have been persuaded not to be vaccinated.

== See also ==
- Deployment of COVID-19 vaccines
