= ARCT =

ARCT or Arct may refer to:

- An Associate of the Royal Conservatory of Music (Toronto)
- Agence de Régulation et de Contrôle des Télécommunications au Burundi, the Mobile Network Code authority for Burundi
- 187th ARCT or Airborne Regimental Combat Team, a name of the 187th Infantry Regiment (United States)

== People with the name ==
- Bohdan Arct (1914–1973), Polish fighter pilot
- Eugeniusz Arct (1899–1974), Polish painter

== See also ==
- ARCT-021, vaccine produced by Arcturus
