= William S. Sly =

American geneticist (1932–2025)

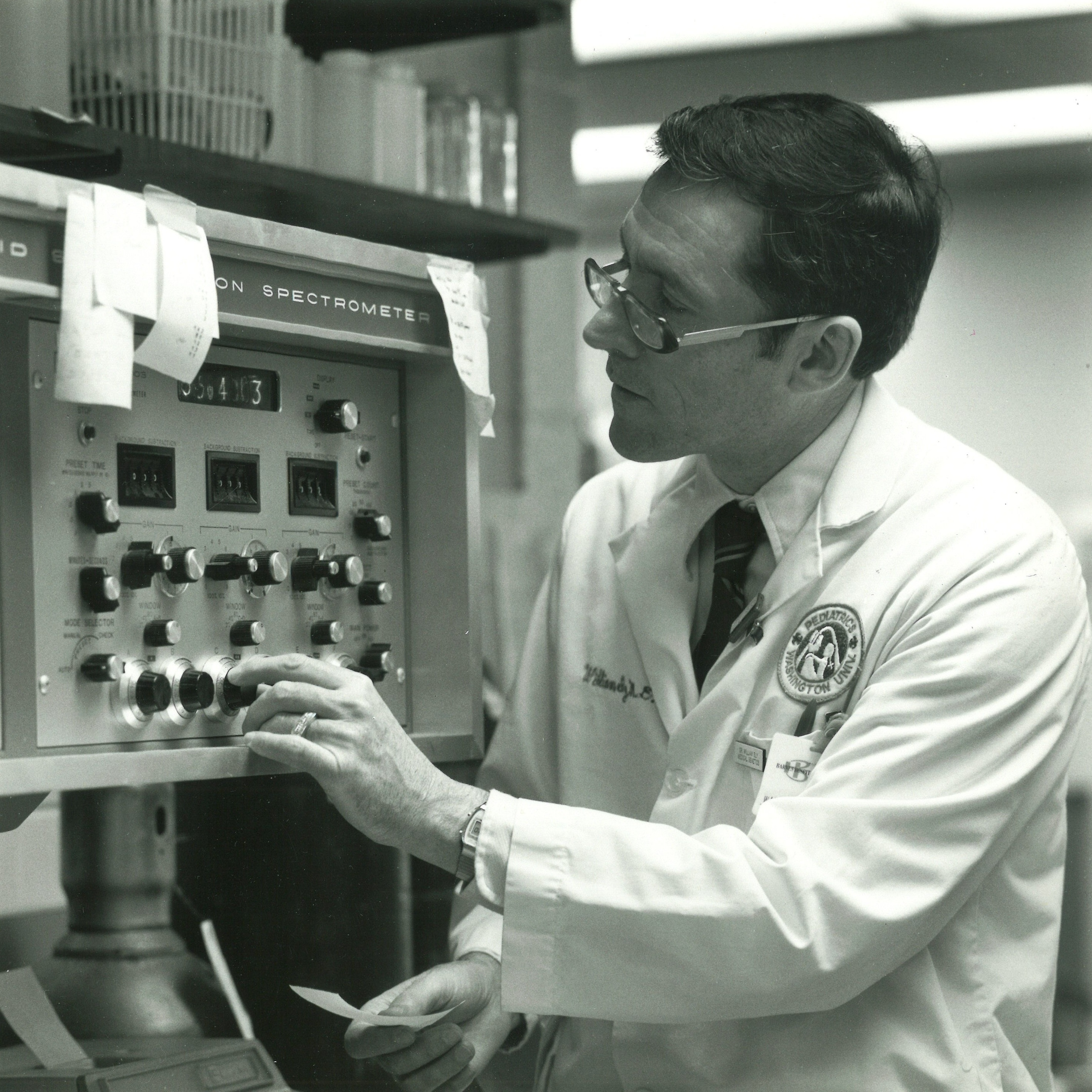
- Sly at Barnes Hospital, Washington University in St. Louis in 1970
- Born: October 19, 1932; East St. Louis, Illinois, U.S.
- Died: May 31, 2025 (aged 92); St. Louis, Missouri, U.S.
- Education: St. Louis University
- Known for: Sly Syndrome, Carbonic Anhydrase Deficiency
- Spouse: Margaret Ann Sly
- Children: 7
- Scientific career
- Fields: Medical Genetics, Biochemistry, Molecular Biology
- Workplaces: St. Louis University; Washington University in St. Louis

William S. Sly (October 19, 1932 – May 31, 2025) was an American physician and scientist who, except for sabbatical years at Oxford and Stanford, spent his entire academic career in St. Louis, Missouri. Following medical school at Saint Louis University School of Medicine, he trained in internal medicine at Washington University in St. Louis under Carl V. Moore and in research laboratories at the Heart Institute at National Institutes of Health in Bethesda, Maryland (under Earl Stadtman, Ph.D., and his protégé, Roy Vagelos, M.D., who were pioneers in enzymology and biochemistry), at the French National Centre for Scientific Research in Paris, and the University of Wisconsin in Madison. He then joined the faculty at Washington University in St. Louis, where he directed the Division of Medical Genetics for 20 years. In 1984, he was recruited to Saint Louis University School of Medicine and appointed Alice A. Doisy Professor and chairman of the Edward A. Doisy Department of Biochemistry and Molecular Biology. He chaired that department for 26 years. In February 2007, he was also named the inaugural holder of the James B. and Joan C. Peter Endowed Chair in Biochemistry and Molecular Biology. He became an emeritus professor in July 2014.

== Education and training ==
Sly earned his high school diploma from St. Henry's Preparatory Seminary in Belleville, Illinois in 1950, then received his undergraduate degree from Saint Louis University in 1953, and his M.D. from Saint Louis University Medical School in 1957. After graduating from medical school, Sly continued his training as an Intern and Assistant Resident at Barnes Hospital between 1957-1959. Sly then spent four years (1959-1963) at the National Institutes of Health's National Heart Institute in Bethesda, Maryland with Drs. Roy Vagelos, Earl Stadtman and Marshall W. Nirenberg. Following his work at the NIH, Sly spent a year in France as a postdoctoral fellow working under Dr. Huguette de Robichon-Szulmajster at the French National Centre for Scientific Research in Gif-sur-Yvette, France. Sly then took a postdoctoral fellowship working with Dr. Julius Adler in the Department of Biochemistry at the University of Wisconsin–Madison. In 1964, Sly joined the faculty at Washington University in St. Louis, where he directed the Division of Medical Genetics for 20 years as a professor of Medicine and Pediatrics.

In 1974, Sly took a sabbatical year at the University of Oxford where he worked in the Genetics Laboratory under Sir Walter Bodmer. In 1981, he took a sabbatical year at Stanford University, where he worked with Drs. James Rothman and Paul Berg.

== Research career ==
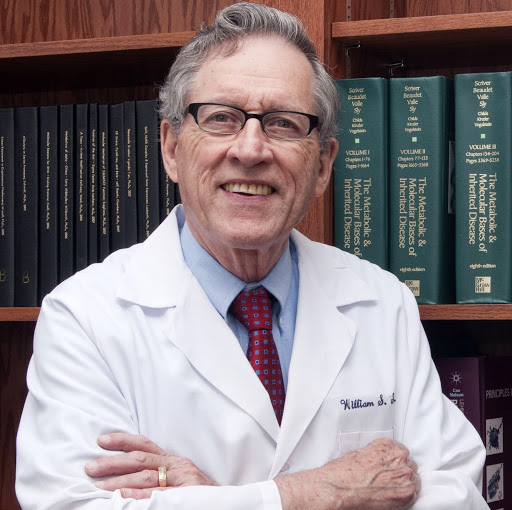
Sly in 2017

Sly made important contributions to several research areas. His group described the first patient with MPS VII (Sly syndrome) and worked with collaborators at The Jackson Laboratory to develop and characterize the mouse model of this disease. He headed studies that identified the mannose-6 phosphate and mannose receptors that target enzymes to lysosomes, which provided the rationale for enzyme replacement therapy in Gaucher’s disease and other lysosomal storage diseases. These discoveries led to his election to the National Academy of Sciences in 1989. He collaborated with the biotechnology company Ultragenyx founded by Emil Kakkis, to develop enzyme replacement for MPS VII (Sly Syndrome), which went into clinical trials in 2017. The drug, Mepsevii (Vestronidase alfa), was approved by the FDA that same year.

Sly also identified the first inherited deficiency of a human carbonic anhydrase, CA II, and defined the biochemical and molecular genetics of this disorder. His laboratory has since characterized many other carbonic anhydrases and produced mouse models of several CA deficiencies. With collaborators, he identified other human diseases attributed to mutations in the genes encoding CA IV, CA VA, and CA XII. Dr. Sly also did research on hereditary hemochromatosis, collaborating on studies leading to the cloning of the HFE gene and identification of the product it encodes. He also showed that the HFE gene knockout in the mouse produces iron storage resembling human hemochromatosis.

Sly also contributed to resolution of a famous forensic case involving a “missing murder”. He and his colleague James Shoemaker provided evidence that Patricia Stallings, a woman convicted for poisoning her child with ethylene glycol (antifreeze) and sentenced to life in prison without parole, was wrongly convicted. Instead, her child had the inherited disease methylmalonic acidemia. An abnormally elevated metabolite called propionic acid in the child’s serum had been misidentified as ethylene glycol. These findings led to her release and exoneration.

== Honors and awards ==
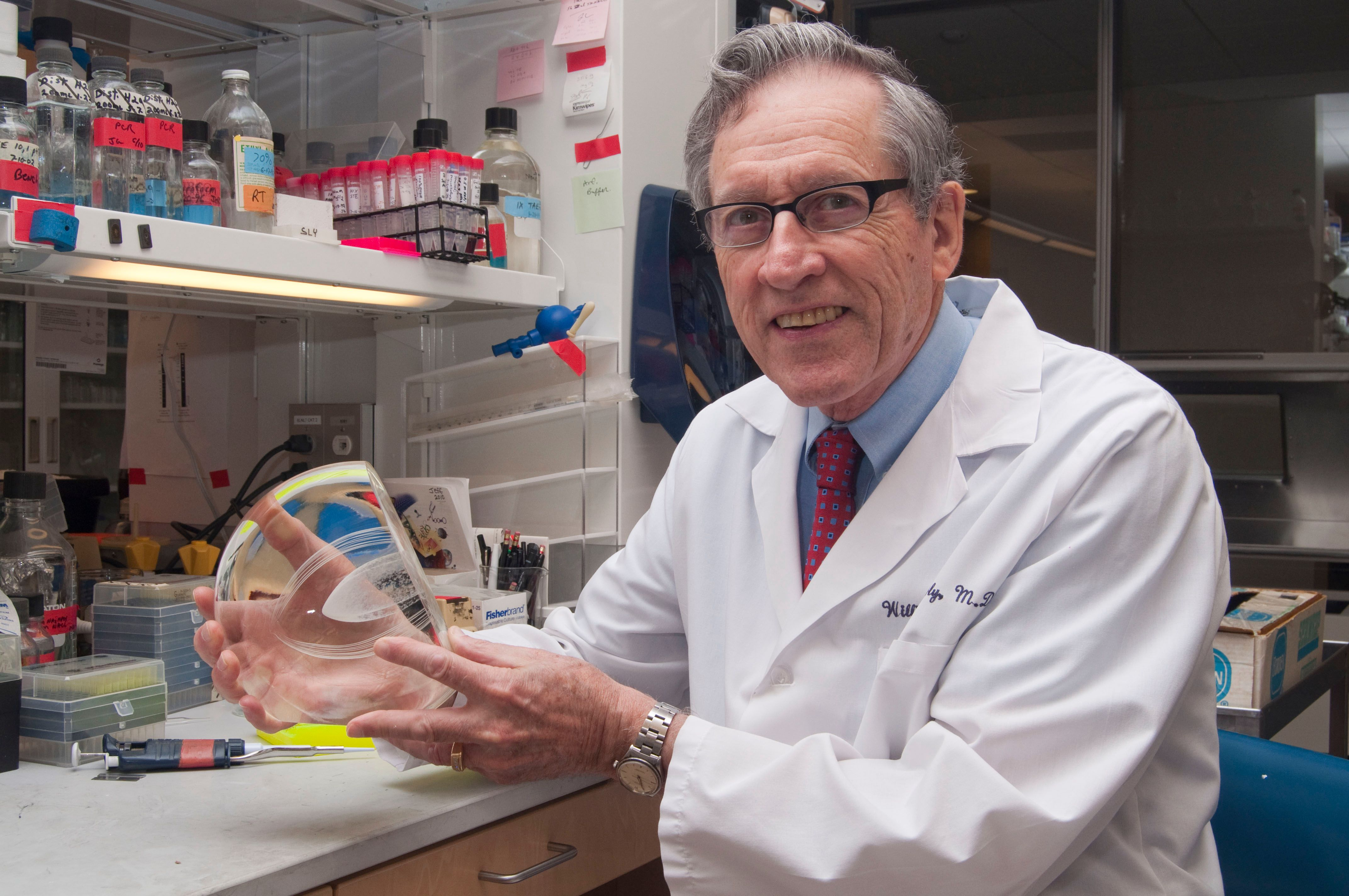
Sly holds an award he received in 2010 at the International Symposium on Mucopolysaccharide and Related Diseases

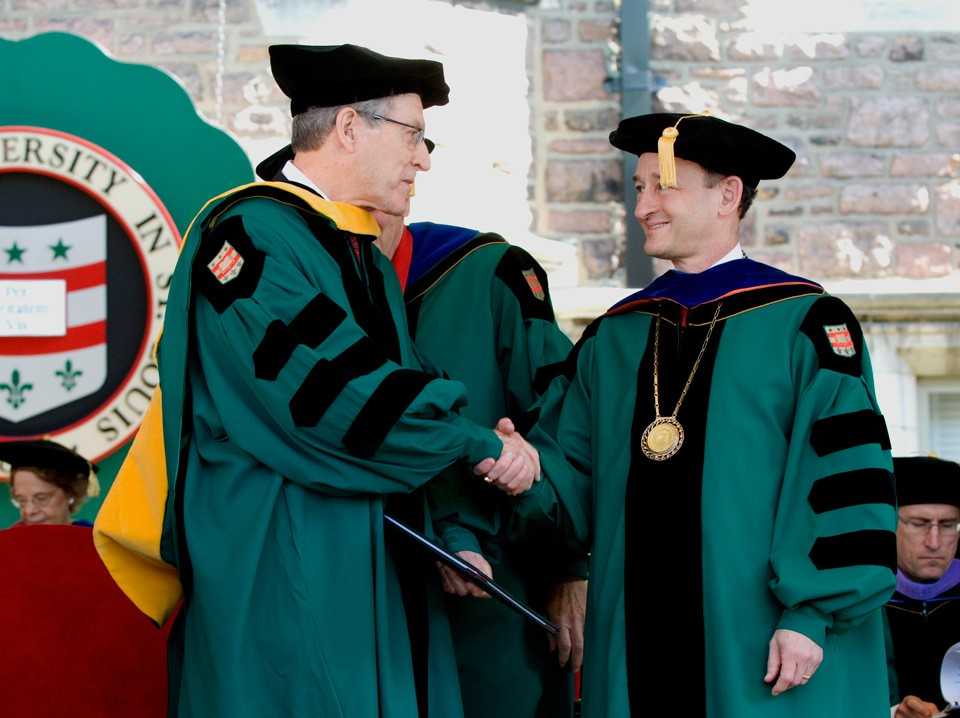
Sly receives an honorary doctorate of science from Washington University in St. Louis in 2007, seen here with chancellor Mark S. Wrighton

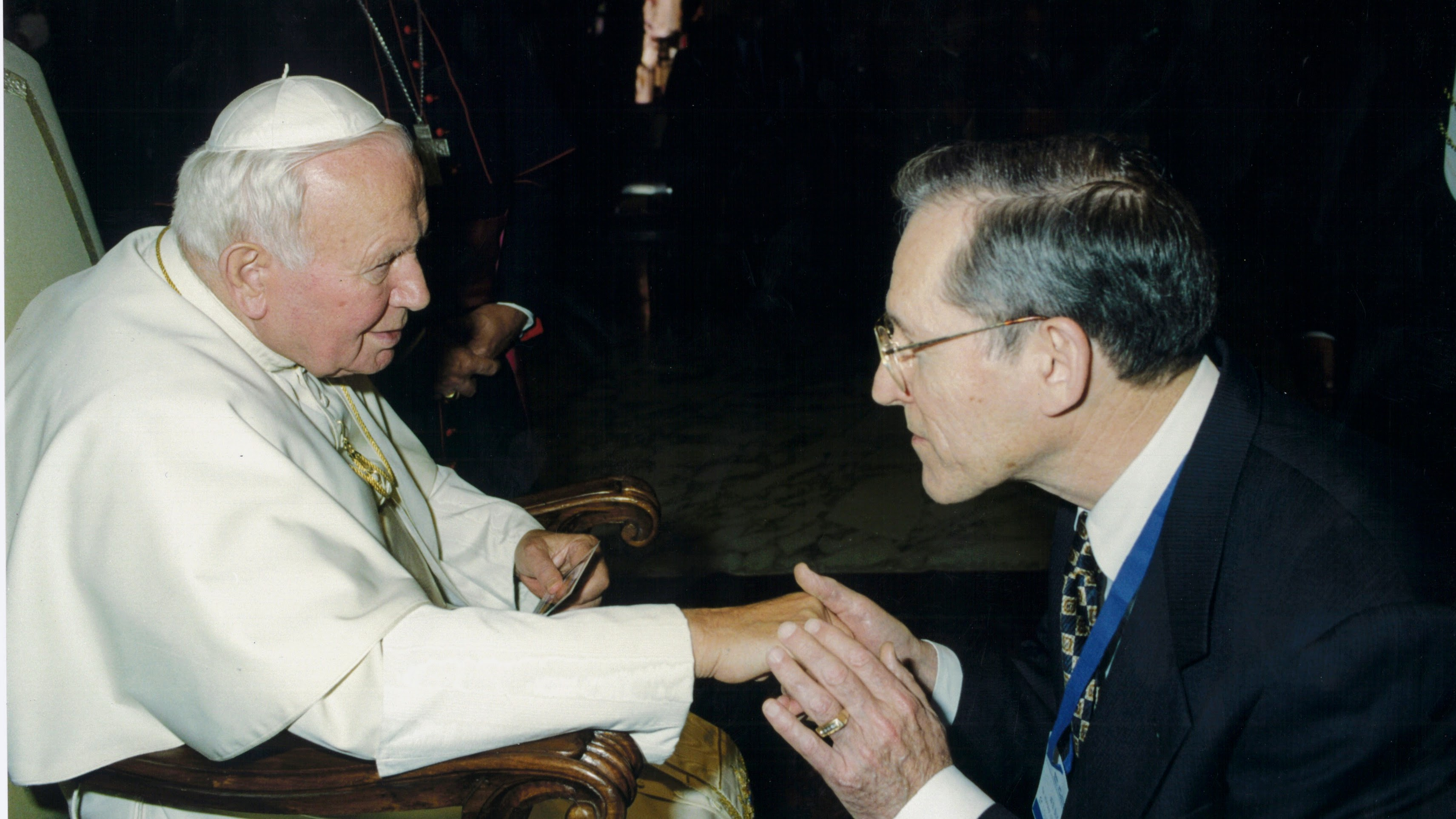
Sly meeting Pope John Paul II at Vatican City

Sly received many awards and honors for his research accomplishments, including induction into the National Academy of Sciences in 1989, the Coriell Medal from the Coriell Institute for Medical Research in Camden, New Jersey, for pioneering work in human genetics, the WORLDSymposium^{™} Roscoe O. Brady Award, the Peter H. Raven Lifetime Achievement Award from the Academy of Science of St. Louis, the Distinguished Scientist Award from the Clinical Ligand Assay Society, the Passano Foundation Award (shared with Stuart Kornfeld), the Burlington Northern Foundation Faculty Achievement Award for outstanding research, the Distinguished Teaching Award for small group facilitation from Saint Louis University School of Medicine, and the Naomi Judd Award from the Friends of the Saint Louis University Liver Center. Sly served on the Scientific Review Board and Medical Advisory Board for the Howard Hughes Medical Institute, the Board of Scientific Overseers for the Jackson Laboratory, and on many scientific societies and other foundations. He served on the editorial boards for several journals and was an editor for the classic metabolic text, The Metabolic and Molecular Bases of Inherited Diseases.

== Personal life and death ==
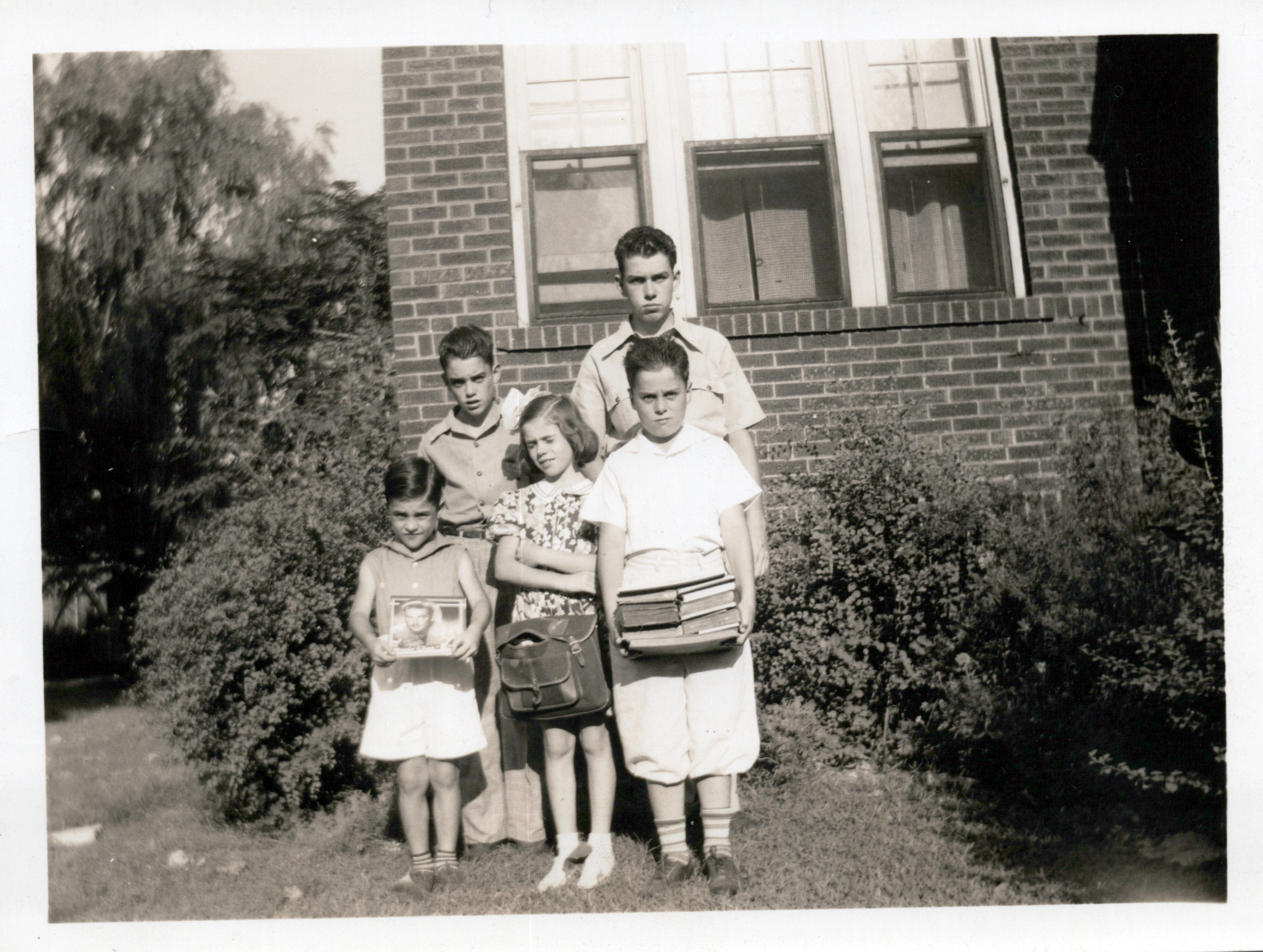
The Sly Family in East St. Louis, c. 1936. Clockwise from front left: William, Edward, Thomas, Clinton, Marion Sly

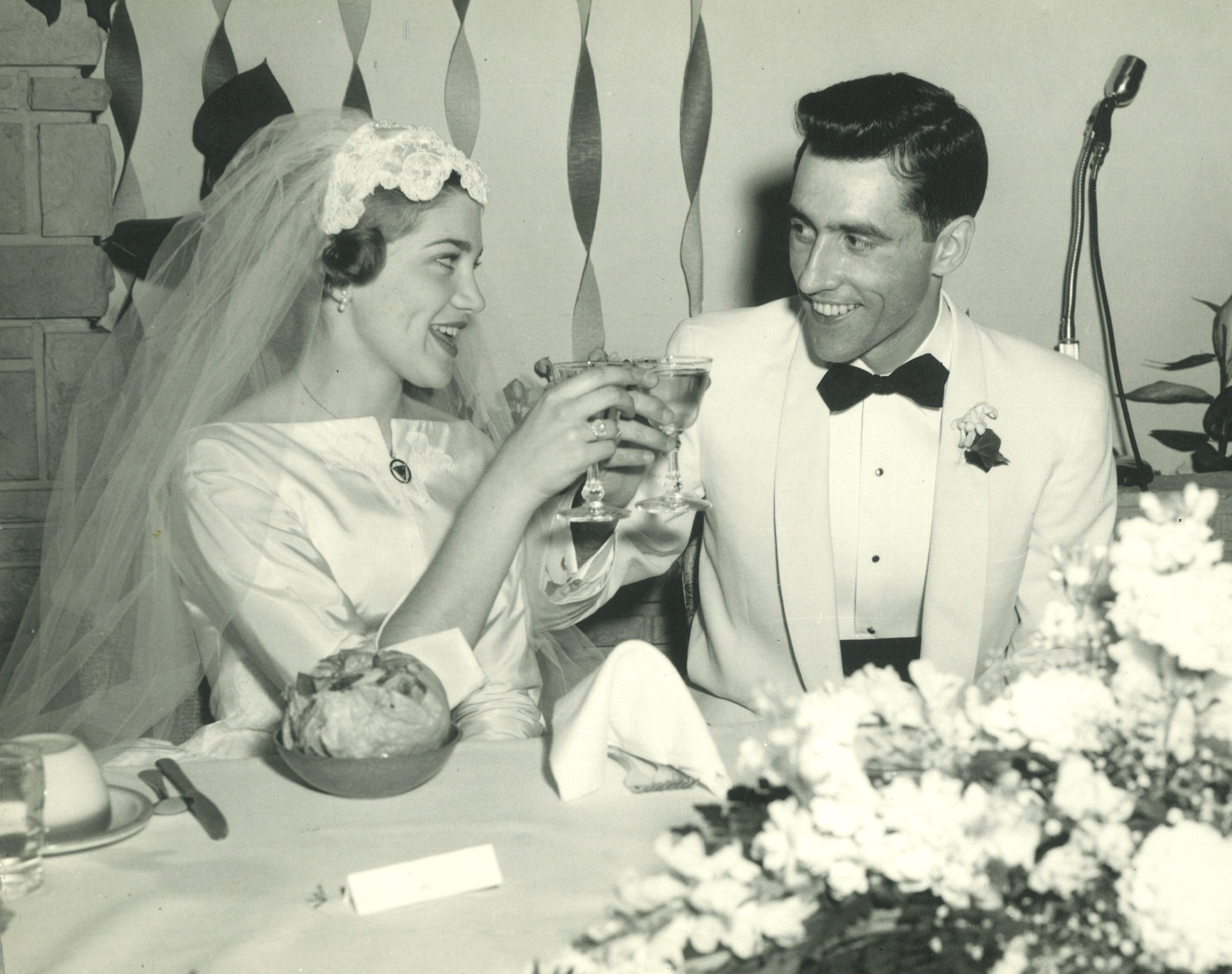
Newlyweds Margaret and William Sly toast together

Sly was the youngest of five children born to Thomas E. Sly and Ollie Mae Shuford.

"My [oldest] brother [Thomas J. Sly] had the kind of leukemia that would likely respond very well to drugs today but they didn’t have anything back then except irradiation. He had a couple of remissions but he died in May of my senior year. That experience had a very dramatic impact on our family. My brother had survived combat duty in World War II. He came home to work side by side with my father in his insurance business and was expected to succeed him. Since [the family physician] Max Hirz was so important in helping us through his illness, I decided I wanted to be a physician like Max."

In 1960, while at the NIH, Sly married Margaret O'Leary. They had seven children, twenty-six grandchildren, and seven great-grandchildren together.

Sly died on May 31, 2025, at the age of 92.
