= Arcturus COVID-19 vaccine =

Arcturus COVID-19 vaccine may refer to:

- ARCT-021
- ARCT-154
