= Zapomeran =

Vaccine against SARS-CoV-2

Vaccine description
- Target: SARS-CoV-2
- Vaccine type: mRNA

Clinical data
- Trade names: Kostaive
- Other names: ARCT-154, MRNA-2105
- ATC code: J07BN01 (WHO)

Legal status
- Legal status: EU: Rx-only; JP: Rx-only

Identifiers
- CAS Number: 2727965-96-8
- UNII: J9E7RSF8K3
- KEGG: D12738

Zapomeran, sold under the brand name Kostaive is a self-amplifying mRNA-based COVID-19 vaccine. It contains a self-amplifying mRNA that encodes the SARS-CoV-2 spike protein. Self-amplifying means that the mRNA also carries instructions to make a protein called replicase.

It was developed under the name ARCT-154, also known as VBC-COV19-154 in Vietnam, by Arcturus Therapeutics. For its development, Arcturus collaborated with Vinbiocare, a Vietnamese company, for support with clinical trials and manufacturing.

Zapomeran was approved for medical use in Japan in November 2023, and it is the first self-amplifying mRNA-based COVID-19 vaccine to be approved. Zapomeran was authorized for medical use in the European Union in February 2025, and in the UK in January 2026.

== Medical uses ==
Zapomeran is used to provide protection against COVID-19, caused by infection with the SARS-CoV-2 virus. The vaccine requires two doses, which are administered 28 days apart. It is a self-amplifying mRNA vaccine.

== Manufacturing ==
The vaccine candidate can be made in a lyophilized powder form, allowed it to be shipped and stored between 2 and 8 °C (36 and 46 °F).

In August 2021, Arcturus Therapeutics entered a partnership with Vinbiocare, a unit of Vingroup to conduct clinical trials of ARCT-154 COVID-19 vaccine, developed created using Arcturus’ STARR mRNA technology, in Vietnam and establish a manufacturing facility a factory in Hòa Lạc Hi-tech Park, Hanoi, which requires an estimated investment of $200 million and has the capacity to make 200 million doses per year. It is expected that Vingroup will produce its first batches of the vaccine in early 2022. Arcturus will provide to Vinbiocare access to "proprietary technologies and processes for the manufacture" of its vaccines, as well as an exclusive license to manufacture them solely for sales and use in Vietnam. This includes all of Arcturus’ other Covid-19 vaccines such as ARCT-021 and other vaccines in the future for disease prevention in Vietnam. Vinbiocare will pay $40m upfront, be responsible for technology transfer costs, and "pay for mRNA drug substance supplied by Arcturus and royalties on vaccines produced at the facility".

== Society and culture ==
=== Legal status ===
Kostaive was approved for medical use in Japan in November 2023.

In December 2024, the Committee for Medicinal Products for Human Use of the European Medicines Agency adopted a positive opinion, recommending the granting of a marketing authorization for the medicinal product Kostaive, a vaccine intended for the prevention of COVID-19 in adults. The applicant for this medicinal product is Arcturus Therapeutics Europe B.V. Zapomeran was authorized for medical use in the European Union in February 2025, and in the UK in January 2026.

== Names ==
Zapomeran is the international nonproprietary name.

== Clinical trials ==
Preclinical research showed that it elicits neutralizing antibodies in non-human primates against COVID-19 variants of concern, including the SARS-CoV-2 Alpha variant, Beta variant, Delta variant, and Gamma variant.

=== In Singapore ===
On 3 August, Arcturus Therapeutics confirmed that the company had received approval for a clinical trial of ARCT-154 and another vaccine called ARCT-165 in Singapore. The Phase I-II clinical trial will evaluate the vaccines as a primary vaccination series and a booster following first dose with Pfizer–BioNTech COVID-19 vaccine. The study is being partially funded by a grant from the Singapore Government.

=== In Vietnam ===
The clinical trials of the vaccine in Vietnam are completely sponsored and funded by Vinbiocare, a Vingroup subsidiary.

On 2 August, Vinbiocare received regulatory approval to start a clinical trial of its COVID-19 vaccine candidate in Vietnam. The company will coordinate with the Ministry of Health to carry out Phase I-III clinical trials of VBC-COV19-154 vaccine on 21,000 adults in three phases in August 2021. The clinical trial Phase 1 will recruit 100 volunteers to evaluate the safety, tolerability, and initial assessment of immunogenicity of the vaccine. The clinical trial Phase 2 enrolled 300 volunteers at designated medical facilities in multiple provinces, while the third phase of human trials is expected to involve 20,600 volunteers, including phase 3a (600 volunteers) and 3b (20,000 volunteers). Those receiving placebo will receive active vaccine after 6 months, while all participants will be followed up for 1 year.

In December 2021, the company plans to complete and submit procedures to the Ministry of Health, applying for an emergency authorization in Vietnam.

==== Phase I ====
The clinical trial Phase I began on 15-16 August at Hanoi Medical University. Phase I was conducted on 100 healthy volunteers randomly assigned in a ratio of 3:1, i.e. 75% of them received the ARCT-154 vaccine and 25% received a placebo. The primary objective of the phase one trial was to assess safety and immunogenicity of the vaccine. Volunteers will receive 2 doses of ARCT-154 vaccine or placebo, 28 days apart. Data of the volunteers from the first dose (day 1) to 7 days after the second dose (day 36), will be evaluated by the research team. Phase I report on the safety of the ARCT-154 vaccine was approved by the Ethics Committee on 20 September 2021. Preliminary results show that the ARCT-154 vaccine is safe in healthy volunteers.

==== Phase II and III ====
Phase II and IIIa trials of the vaccine were carried out at the same time in Bắc Ninh, Hanoi and Long An with a total of 1,000 volunteers. The trial work in the northern localities is carried out by Hanoi Medical University and Pasteur Institute in Ho Chi Minh City in the south. In Bắc Ninh, from 20 to 23 September, the research team started recruiting volunteers and selected 338 people aged 18-65, who received the first dose from 27 to 29 September. In Long An and Hanoi, the Ministry of Health also implemented the first dose for volunteers. The phase IIIa trial is expected to end on 24 November, and the research team will report the results of the trial to the Ministry of Health on 30 December.

=== In Japan ===
A phase III trial non-inferiority trial randomized 828 participants to ARCT-154 or the Pfizer-BionTech vaccine in Japan, with results published in December 2023.
