= Self-amplifying RNA =

Next-generation mRNA vaccine/therapeutic

Self-amplifying RNA (saRNA), also termed self-replicating RNA (srRNA), is a type of mRNA molecule engineered to replicate itself within host cells, enhancing protein expression and boosting the immune response, making it a promising tool for vaccines and other therapeutic applications. As a "next-generation" mRNA, saRNA is designed to achieve greater protein expression with a reduced dose compared to conventional mRNA. Unlike conventional mRNA, which has a short half-life and limited ability to express proteins for an extended time, saRNA can sustain protein expression for longer periods. saRNA are based on positive-sense single-stranded RNA viruses — most commonly alphaviruses such as Venezuelan equine encephalitis virus.

Conventional messenger RNA (mRNA) vaccines only produce a finite amount of protein due to the short mRNA half-life. saRNA extends the kinetics of expression by a second open reading frame (ORF) encoding the protein machinery necessary for its own replication. This self-replication dramatically increases both the amount of RNA and the time of expression. Consequently, the amount of protein produced from the initial dose is increased as compared to conventional mRNA.

== Structure and mechanism of action ==
The structure of saRNA includes two key components:

=== Replicon region ===
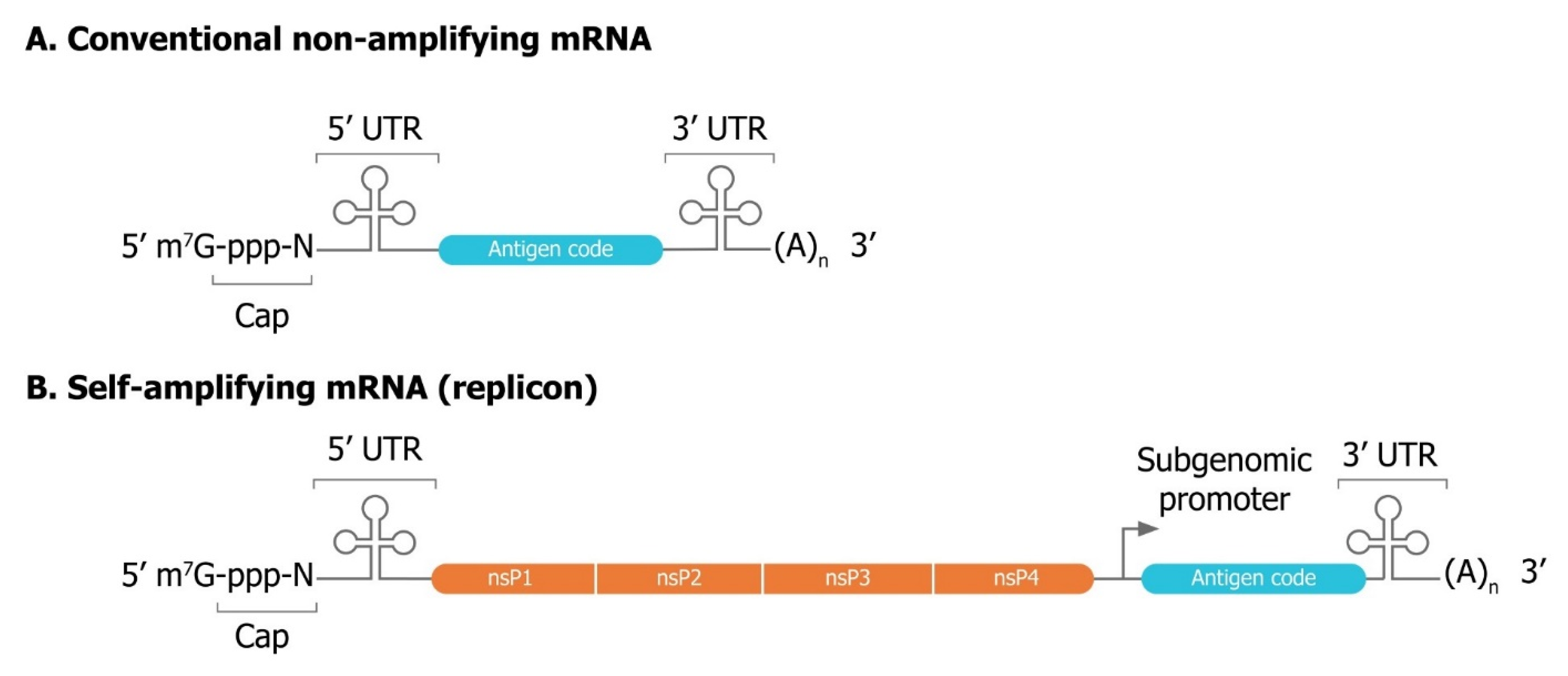
Comparison of coding sequence structure of conventional mRNA and self-amplifying RNA (saRNA)

saRNA encode for the machinery to replicate and amplify the mRNA in its open reading frame (shown in orange), which is the viral RNA dependent RNA polymerase (RdRp). This is a single polypeptide of viral non-structural proteins that is processed into the four protein components of the RNA dependent RNA polymerase (nsp1, nsp2, nsp3 and nsp4).

=== Gene of interest ===
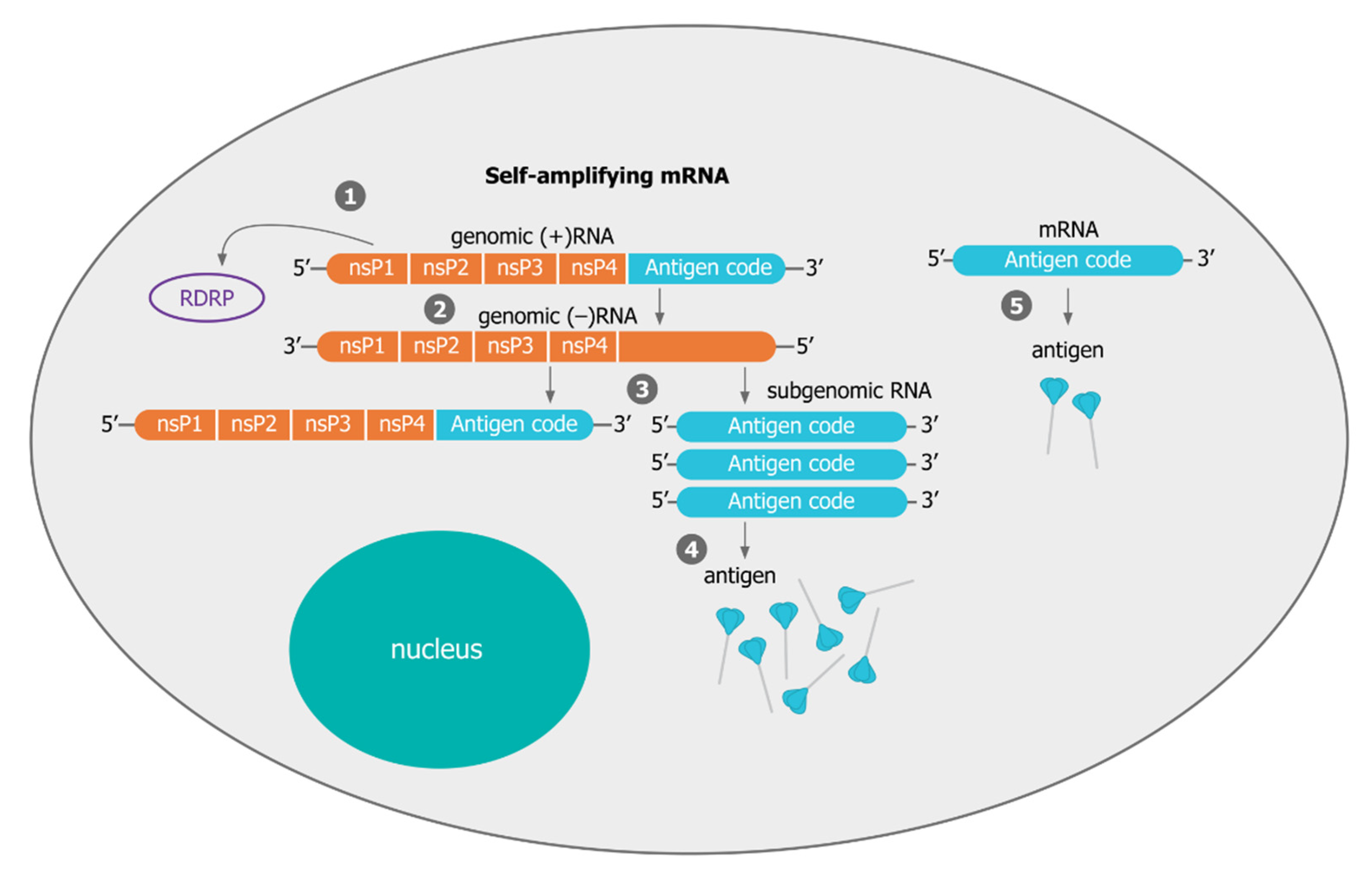
Mechanism of self-amplifying mRNA (saRNA) used for antigen production. The ORF encoding the antigen can also be substituted with a protein for use in protein replacement therapy

This sequence encodes the protein of interest, used as an antigen in the case of vaccines or for protein replacement therapies. The gene of interest replaces the viral structural proteins. The RNA polymerase encoded by the non-structural proteins, transcribes the gene of interest from a specific promoter (the subgenomic promoter). This subgenomic mRNA encoding the gene of interest is produced at high levels and is capped by a protein component of the non-structural proteins.

== Advantages ==
The self-replicating and amplifying nature of saRNA results in high levels of protein expression even at small doses, significantly enhancing the immune response. Additionally, saRNA vaccines can be manufactured more rapidly and at a lower cost compared to traditional vaccines. saRNA also offers stability by inducing a prolonged immune response, potentially providing longer-lasting protection. Furthermore, this versatile technology can be adapted for a wide range of applications, including infectious diseases, cancer immunotherapy, and genetic disorders.

== Applications and research ==
The COVID-19 pandemic has accelerated research into RNA-based technologies, including saRNA. For instance, saRNA vaccines targeting SARS-CoV-2 have shown promising results in preclinical studies, indicating strong and durable immune responses with minimal adverse effects. An saRNA COVID booster vaccine developed by Arcturus (ARCT-154) has received full approval for use in adults by Japan's Ministry of Health, Labour and Welfare, as well as the European Union.

saRNA is also being explored for gene therapy. Its ability to produce high levels of therapeutic proteins makes it a promising candidate for treating genetic disorders where protein replacement is needed.

== Challenges and future directions ==
While saRNA technology holds great promise, it also faces several challenges. Efficient and safe delivery of saRNA into target cells remains a critical hurdle, with lipid nanoparticles (LNPs) and other delivery systems currently being optimized to address this issue. Ensuring the long-term safety of saRNA is also important, and ongoing research is focused on minimizing potential side effects and immune reactions. Other delivery vehicles have been used in clinical trials to promote inflammation helpful for antibody production, such as the LION cationic nanocarrier formulation. This has been used in the GEMCOVAC-19 vaccine with the saRNA being adsorbed on the surface of the LION nano-lipid emulsion and has received emergency licensure in India. A second saRNA for COVID-19, ARCT-154, was developed by Arcturus Therapeutics. A version manufactured by Meiji Seika Pharma was authorised in Japan in November 2023.

A challenge with saRNAs as a therapeutic remains interferon production from the innate immune response. It has been asserted that modified nucleosides are incompatible with the saRNA replication. Nevertheless, to circumvent the induction of innate immune response, newer saRNA formats have been developed that incorporate modified nucleoside substitutions such as 5-methylcytosine, 5-methyluridine, N1-methylpseudouridine (the same nucleoside used in the Moderna and Pfizer/Biontech COVID mRNA vaccines) with varying degree of efficacy. At low doses (10 ng/mouse), one study found use of the 5-methylcytosine nucleoside in synthesis having 5-fold higher protein expression than unmodified saRNA, which had in turn over 100x higher expression than N1-methylpseudouridine substituted saRNA. Concomitantly, this study found that use of modified unmodified saRNA resulted in significant increases in the expression of IFNα and IFNβ after 6 h. In contrast modified saRNA had reduced interferon expression. Specifically, modified saRNA with 5-methylcytosine and 5-hydroxymethylcytidine had reduced expression of IFNα1 8.5-fold and IFNβ1 3-fold respectively.
