= Avalotcagene ontaparvovec =

Experimental gene therapy

Avalotcagene ontaparvovec (DTX301) is "a non-replicating, recombinant self-complimentary adeno-associated virus vector serotype 8 (scAAV8)-encoding human ornithine transcarbamylase". It is developed by Dimension Therapeutics for ornithine transcarbamylase (OTC) deficiency.
