= UX701 =

Experimental gene therapy

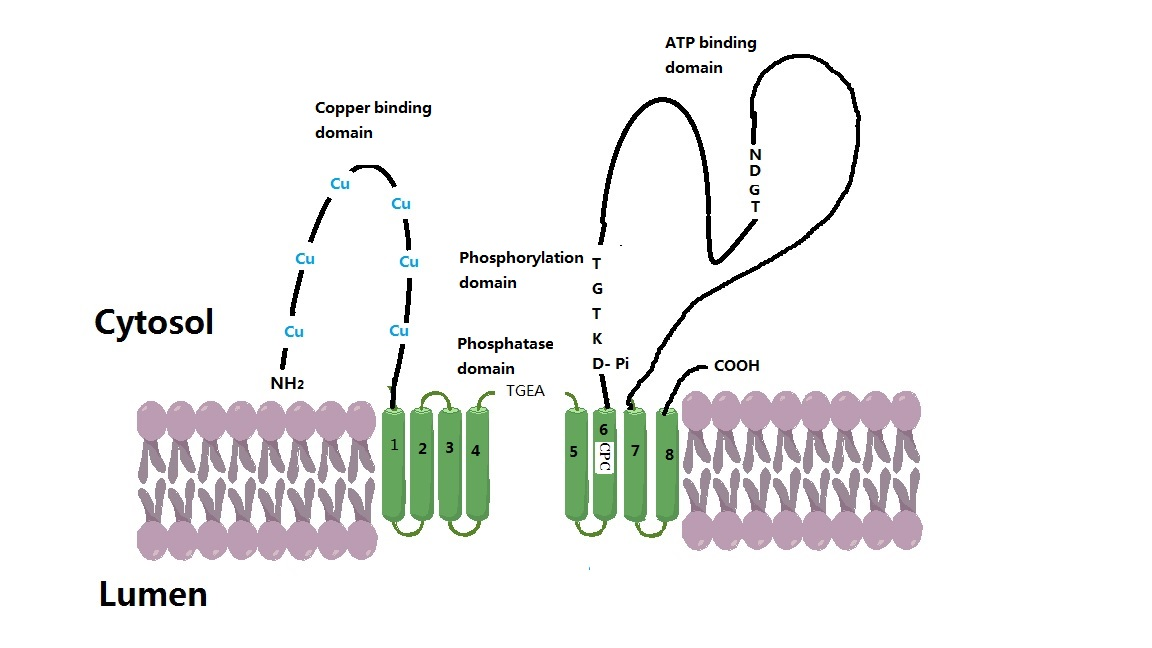
- Wilson disease causes a defective copper-binding protein. UX701 is intended to correct the gene producing this protein.

Clinical data
- Other names: Rivunatpagene Miziparvovec (USAN US)

Legal status
- Legal status: Experimental (as of 2026)

Identifiers
- PubChem SID: 474492994
- DrugBank: DB18317

UX701 is an experimental gene therapy for Wilson disease, delivered via adeno-associated virus, that restores a functional version of the ATP7B gene. Wilson disease is a rare genetic disease that results in high levels of copper in the body.

== Cyprus2+ study ==
As of June 2026, UX701 is being evaluated in a Phase 1/2/3 study known as Cyprus2+.

In October 2024, interim data from the first 15 patients showed that 40% had successfully tapered off standard-of-care chelator or zinc therapies while maintaining stable copper levels. Based on these results, Ultragenyx planned to expand the trial with a higher dose and an optimized immunomodulation regimen to further evaluate efficacy, before moving into a dose expansion study.
