= Emil Kakkis =

American geneticist and philosopher

- Born: 1960 (age 65–66)
- Education: Pomona College; UCLA; David Geffen School of Medicine at UCLA
- Known for: Developing treatments for ultra rare disorders
- Medical career
- Institutions: Ultragenyx Pharmaceutical, Founder; Kakkis EveryLife Foundation, Founder; BioMarin, Former Chief Medical Officer
- Sub-specialties: Rare biochemical and genetic diseases also known as inborn error of metabolism
- Research: Enzyme Replacement Therapy
- Awards: Bogen Prize; Vaile Prize in Biology; Lifetime achievement award from the National MPS Society; California Life Sciences Award

Emil Kakkis (born 1960) is an American medical geneticist known for his work to develop treatments for ultra-rare diseases. He is the Founder of the EveryLife Foundation for Rare Disease and Ultragenyx.

== Professional background ==
Kakkis began his work at Harbor–UCLA Medical Center working with minimal funding and support to develop an enzyme replacement therapy (Aldurazyme) for the rare disorder Mucopolysaccharidosis (MPS I). Translating from a successful canine model to patients was financially supported by the Ryan Foundation.

Aldurazyme development was later supported by BioMarin and eventually, their partner Genzyme leading to U.S. Food and Drug Administration (FDA) approval in 2003. During his tenure at BioMarin, Kakkis guided the development and approval of two more treatments for rare disorders, MPS VI and PKU and has contributed to the initiation of seven other treatment programs for rare disorders.

Kakkis graduated from Pomona College and received a combined MD and Ph.D. from the UCLA Medical Scientist Program. He completed a Pediatrics residency and Medical Genetics Training Fellowship at Harbor–UCLA Medical Center. He became an assistant professor of Pediatrics at Harbor-UCLA Medical Center from 1993 to 1998 where he initiated the enzyme therapy program for MPS I.

== Philanthropy ==
In early 2009, Kakkis founded the EveryLife Foundation to accelerate biotech innovation for rare diseases. The Foundation initiated the CureTheProcess Campaign to improve the regulatory and clinical development process for rare diseases.

In 2010, Kakkis worked with the U.S. FDA and Congress to improve the regulatory process for rare diseases. This resulted in the Brownback Brown Amendment to the 2010 FDA appropriation bill. that required the FDA to review its rare disease regulatory policies and look for ways to improve.

== Publications ==
- Shull, R.M., Kakkis, E.D., McEntee, M.F., Kania, S.A., Jonas, A.J., Neufeld, E.F.: Enzyme replacement in a canine model of Hurler syndrome. Proceedings of the National Academy of Sciences of the USA. 91(26):12937–12941, 1994.
- Kakkis, E.D., McEntee, M.F., Schmidtchen, A., Neufeld, E.F., Ward, D.A., Gompf, R.E., Kania, S., Bedolla, C., Chien, S.L., Shull, R.M.: Long-term and high-dose trials of enzyme replacement therapy in the canine model of mucopolysaccharidosis I. Biochemical and Molecular Medicine. 58(2):156-167, 1996.
- Zhao, K.W., Faull, K.L., Kakkis, E.D., Neufeld, E.F.: Carbohydrate structures of recombinant human a-L-iduronidase secreted by Chinese hamster ovary cells. The Journal of Biological Chemistry. 272(36): 22758–22765, 1997.
- Kakkis, E.D., Muenzer, J., Tiller, G.E., Waber, L., Belmont, J., Passage, M., Izykowski, B., Phillips, J., Doroshow, R., Walot, I., Hoft, R., Neufeld, E.F.: Enzyme-replacement therapy In mucopolysaccharidosis I. New England Journal of Medicine. 344(3):182-188, 2001.
- Kakkis, E.D.: Enzyme replacement therapy for the mucopolysaccharide storage disorders. Expert Opinion on Investigational Drugs. 11(5):675-685, 2002.
- Kakkis, E., Lester, T., Yang, R., Tanaka, C., Anand, V., Lemontt, J., Peinovich, M.: Passage, M.: Successful induction of immune tolerance to enzyme replacement therapy in canine mucopolysaccharidosis I. Proceedings of the National Academy of Sciences of the USA. 101(3):829-834, 2004.
- Wraith, J.E., Clarke, L.A., Beck, M., Kolodny, E.H., Pastores, G.M., Muenzer, J., Rapoport, D.M., Berger, K.I., Swiedler, S.J., Kakkis, E.D., Braakman, T., Chadbourne, E., Walton-Bowen, K. Cox, G.F.: Enzyme replacement therapy for mucopolysaccharidosis I: a randomized, double-blinded, placebo-controlled, multinational study of recombinant human a-L-iduronidase (laronidase). The Journal of Pediatrics. 144(5):581-588, 2004.
- Kakkis, E., McEntee, M., Vogler, C., et al.: Intrathecal enzyme replacement therapy reduces lysosomal storage in the brain and meninges of the canine model of MPS I. Molecular Genetics and Metabolism. 83(1-2):163-174, 2004.
- Harmatz, P., Giugliani, R., Schwartz, I., Guffon, N., Teles, E.L., Miranda, M.C., Wraith, J.E., Beck, M., Arash, L., Scarpa, M., Yu, Z.F., Wittes, J., Berger, K.I., Newman, M.S., Lowe, A.M., Kakkis, E., Swiedler, S.J., MPS VI Phase 3 Study Group: Enzyme replacement therapy for mucopolysaccharidosis VI: a phase 3, randomized, double-blind, placebo-controlled, multinational study of recombinant human N-acetylgalactosamine 4-sulfatase (recombinant human arylsulfatase B or rhASB) and follow-on, open-label extension study. The Journal of Pediatrics, 148(4):533-539, 2006.
- Sifuentes, M., Doroshow, R., Hoft, R., Mason, G., Walot, I., Diament, M., Okazaki, S., Huff, K., Cox, G.F., Swiedler, S.J., Kakkis, E.D.: A follow-up study of MPS I patients treated with laronidase enzyme replacement therapy for 6 years. Molecular Genetics and Metabolism, 90(2):171-180, 2007.
- Dickson, P., McEntee, M., Vogler, C., Le, S., Levy, B., Peinovich, M., Hanson, S., Passage, M., Kakkis, E.: Intrathecal enzyme replacement therapy: Successful treatment of brain disease via the cerebrospinal fluid. Molecular Genetics and Metabolism, 91(1):61-68, 2007.
- Wraith, J.E., Beck, M., Lane, R., van der Ploeg, A., Shapiro, E., Xue, Y., Kakkis, E.D., Guffon, N.: Enzyme replacement therapy in patients who have mucopolysaccharidosis I and are younger than 5 years: results of a multinational study of recombinant human a-L-iduronidase (laronidase). Pediatrics, 120(1):37-46, 2007.
- Dickson, P., Peinovich, M., McEntee, M., Lester, T., Le, S., Krieger, K., Manuel, H., Jabagat, C., Passage, M, Kakkis, E.: Immune tolerance improves the efficacy of enzyme replacement therapy in canine mucopolysaccharidosis I. The Journal of Clinical Investigation, 118(8); 2868–2876, 2008.
- Giugliani, R., Muñoz Rojas, V., Martins, A., Valadares, E., Clarke, J., Góes, J., Kakkis, E., Worden, M., Sidman, M., Cox, G.: A dose-optimization trial of laronidase (Aldurazyme) in patients with mucopolysaccharidosis I. Molecular Genetics and Metabolism, 96(1); 13-19, 2009.
- Clarke, L.A., Wraith, J.E., Beck, M., Kolodny, E.H., Pastores, G.M., Muenzer, J., Rapoport, D.M., Berger, K.I., Sidman, M., Kakkis, E.D., Cox, G.F.: Long-term efficacy and safety of laronidase in the treatment of mucopolysaccharidosis I. Pediatrics, 123; 229-240, 2009.
- Trefz FK, Burton BK, Longo N, Casanova MM, Gruskin DJ, Dorenbaum A, Kakkis ED, Crombez EA, Grange DK, Harmatz P, Lipson MH, Milanowski A, Randolph LM, Vockley J, Whitley CB, Wolff JA, Bebchuk J, Christ-Schmidt H, Hennermann JB, Sapropterin Study Group Efficacy of Sapropterin Dihydrochloride in Increasing Phenylalanine Tolerance in Children with Phenylketonuria: A Phase III, Randomized, Double-Blind, Placebo-Controlled Study. J Pediatr, 2009 Mar 2, Vol., Pages, PMID 19261295.
- Kakkis, Emil (2022) Saving Ryan, Impositivity Media, ASIN B09P9Z1VXC
