= Evinacumab =

Monoclonal antibody

Monoclonal antibody
- Type: Whole antibody
- Source: Human
- Target: Angiopoietin-like 3 (ANGPTL3)

Clinical data
- Trade names: Evkeeza
- Other names: REGN1500, evinacumab-dgnb
- AHFS/Drugs.com: Evkeeza
- License data: US DailyMed: Evinacumab
- Routes of administration: Intravenous
- ATC code: C10AX17 (WHO)

Legal status
- Legal status: CA: ℞-only; US: ℞-only; EU: Rx-only

Identifiers
- CAS Number: 1446419-85-7
- DrugBank: DB15354
- ChemSpider: none
- UNII: T8B2ORP1DW
- KEGG: D11753

Chemical and physical data
- Formula: C_{6480}H_{9992}N_{1716}O_{2042}S_{46}
- Molar mass: 146083.95 g·mol^{−1}

Evinacumab, sold under the brand name Evkeeza, is a monoclonal antibody medication for the treatment of homozygous familial hypercholesterolemia (HoFH).

Evkeeza is given as an infusion (drip) into a vein for 60 minutes every 4 weeks.

Common side effects include nasopharyngitis (cold), influenza-like illness, dizziness, rhinorrhea (runny nose), and nausea. Serious hypersensitivity (allergic) reactions have occurred in the Evkeeza clinical trials.

Evinacumab binds to the angiopoietin-like protein 3 (ANGPTL3). ANGPTL3 slows the function of certain enzymes that break down fats in the body. Evinacumab blocks ANGPTL3, allowing faster break down of fats that lead to high cholesterol. Evinacumab was approved for medical use in the United States in February 2021. The U.S. Food and Drug Administration considers it to be a first-in-class medication.

== History ==
Regeneron invented evinacumab.

The effectiveness and safety of evinacumab were evaluated in a double-blind, randomized, placebo-controlled, 24-week trial enrolling 65 participants with homozygous familial hypercholesterolemia (HoFH). In the trial, 43 participants received 15 mg/kg of evinacumab every four weeks and 22 participants received the placebo. Participants were taking other lipid-lowering therapies as well. The trial was conducted in the United States, Italy, France, Greece, Netherlands, Austria, Canada, Australia, New Zealand, Ukraine, South Africa, and Japan.

The primary measure of effectiveness was the percent change in low-density lipoprotein (LDL-C) from the beginning of treatment to week 24. At week 24, participants receiving evinacumab had an average 47% decrease in LDL-C while participants on the placebo had an average 2% increase.

The U.S. Food and Drug Administration (FDA) granted the application for evinacumab orphan drug, breakthrough therapy, and priority review designations. The FDA granted approval of Evkeeza to Regeneron Pharmaceuticals, Inc.

== Society and culture ==
=== Legal status ===
In April 2021, the Committee for Medicinal Products for Human Use (CHMP) of the European Medicines Agency (EMA) adopted a positive opinion, recommending the granting of a marketing authorization under exceptional circumstances for the medicinal product Evkeeza, intended for the treatment of adult and adolescent patients aged 12 years and older with homozygous familial hypercholesterolaemia (HoFH). The applicant for this medicinal product is Regeneron Ireland Designated Activity Company (DAC). Evinacumab was approved for medical use in the European Union in June 2021.
