= Eugeniusz Arct =

Polish painter

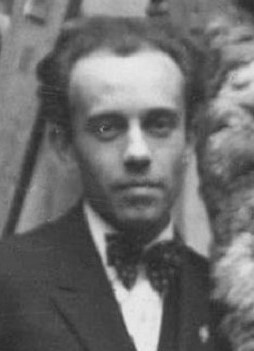
- Born: 24 December 1899; Odessa, Ukraine
- Died: 22 January 1974 (aged 74); Warsaw, Poland
- Occupation: Painter

Eugeniusz Arct (24 December 1899 – 22 January 1974) was a Polish painter. His work was part of the painting event in the art competition at the 1936 Summer Olympics.
