= ARCT-021 =

Vaccine candidate against COVID-19

Vaccine description
- Target: SARS-CoV-2
- Vaccine type: sa-mRNA

Clinical data
- Other names: LUNAR-COV19
- Routes of administration: Intramuscular

Identifiers
- CAS Number: 2541451-24-3

ARCT-021, also known as LUNAR-COV19, is a COVID-19 vaccine candidate developed by Arcturus Therapeutics.

== Medical uses ==
It requires the intramuscular injection with a single dose.

== Pharmacology ==
ARCT-021 is an self-amplifying mRNA vaccine.

== History ==
Arcturus Therapeutics partnered with Singapore's Duke–NUS Medical School to develop a COVID-19 vaccine. The company also partnered with Catalent, a contract development and manufacturing organization, to manufacture multiple batches of Arcturus' COVID-19 mRNA vaccine candidate.

=== Clinical trials ===
LUNAR-COV19 clinical trials in humans began in July 2020. On 4 January 2021, Arcturus Therapeutics started Phase-2 clinical trials.

== Economics ==
Arcturus has entered into development and supply agreements with the Economic Development Board of Singapore and supply agreements with the Israel Ministry of Health for LUNAR-COV19.
