= Arcturus Therapeutics =

American biotech firm

Arcturus Therapeutics Holdings Inc.
- Type: Public
- Traded as: Nasdaq: ARCT
- Industry: Pharmaceutical industry
- Founded: 2013; 13 years ago
- Founder: Joseph Payne and Pad Chivukula
- Headquarters: San Diego, California, US
- Key people: Joseph Payne (president, CEO & director of the board); Padmanabh Chivukula (CSO & COO); Dennis Mulroy (CFO)
- Products: ARCT-810 for treatment of OTCD; received FDA Orphan Drug Status on 27 July 2019; Phase 1 Clinical Trials in Healthy Volunteers Initiated on 05 June 2020, ARCT-021 Vaccine for COVID-19; Phase 1/2 Initiated 22 July 2020, Phase 2 Initiated 9 January 2021
- Revenue: ▲$21 Million(2019)
- Number of employees: 124
- Website: www.arcturusrx.com

Arcturus Therapeutics Holdings Inc. is an American RNA medicines biotechnology company focused on the discovery, development and commercialization of therapeutics for rare diseases and infectious diseases. Arcturus has developed proprietary lipid nanoparticle RNA therapeutics for nucleic acid medicines including small interfering RNA (siRNA), messenger RNA (mRNA), gene editing RNA, DNA, antisense oligonucleotides, and microRNA.

The company develops RNA therapeutics for the treatment of rare diseases such as ornithine transcarbamylase deficiency, and respiratory diseases such as cystic fibrosis. Vaccine medicines include a vaccine candidate for COVID-19 and an influenza vaccine in the preclinical development phase. The vaccine for COVID-19 (KOSTAIVE®) was authorised in Japan in 2023 and the European Union in 2025.

== History ==
Founded in 2013 by Joseph Payne and Pad Chivukula, Arcturus Therapeutics is headquartered in San Diego, California. Initially, they developed a proprietary lipid nanoparticle delivery system called Lunar, able to safely deliver therapeutic RNA or DNA to target cells inside a patient's body.

In September 2017, Arcturus Therapeutics merged with Alcobra Ltd., an Israeli pharmaceutical company. In February of 2018, Joseph Payne was dismissed as president and CEO by the Arcturus Therapeutics board of directors at that time. After ignored requests for a shareholders meeting, Joseph Payne subsequently filed legal proceedings with the Israeli Court which ruled in favor of upholding shareholder rights by sanctioning the meeting of shareholders.

In April of 2018, the Arcturus Therapeutics board of directors at the time filed their own complaint against Joseph Payne and his nominees to the board. In May of 2018, a legal settlement was agreed upon: 4 new directors were appointed to the board (Peter Farrell, Andrew Sassine, James Barlow and Magda Marquet) resulting in the resignation of Stuart Collinson, Daniel Geffken, David Shapiro, and Craig Willett. Other key terms of the settlement agreement included mutual releases of all parties and the agreement by Arcturus Therapeutics and Joseph Payne to terminate all pending litigation.

== Products ==
=== Lunar ===
Lunar is a lipid nanoparticle drug delivery system which targets specific cells inside the body to deliver a payload of RNA into the cell. Once release of the RNA into the cell occurs, the normal translational machinery of the cell can interact with the RNA to make a functional protein with a therapeutic effect. Prior to the Lunar technique, efficient in vivo delivery has also been challenging because existing lipid nanoparticles at the time could cause liver damage and elicit a strong immune response.

This lipid nanoparticle delivery system has been used to deliver ornithine transcarbamylase messenger RNA to liver cells in order to treat citrin deficiency and ornithine transcarbamylase deficiency. OTCD is the most common urea cycle disorder, which impacts an individual's ability to remove toxic waste products from the body. In collaboration with the Salk Institute for Biological Studies in La Jolla, California, successful delivery of a Factor IX messenger RNA to the liver was reported, which suggested viability of the approach to potentially treat diseases requiring protein replacement. Researchers at the MD Anderson Cancer Center also showed the application of mRNA delivered in nanoparticles using the Lunar platform for the treatment of malignancy in intracerebral glioma.

In 2019, a drug named ARCT-810 which uses Lunar, received FDA orphan drug status for treating ornithine transcarbamylase deficiency. The orphan drug designation is granted to drugs capable of treating rare diseases that affect less than 200,000 people in the United States, and grants seven years of marketing exclusivity after approval. On April 13, 2020, it was announced that the company's investigational new drug application for Phase 1b study in patients with OTCD was allowed to proceed by the U.S. FDA. Clinical trials in patients began in June 2020. ARCT-2601 is Arcturus’ next-generation investigational mRNA therapeutic for OTCD.

LUNAR 2.0™ is the Company’s next-generation mRNA delivery platform that incorporates improved lipids and an enhanced formulation process specific to these lipids.

=== Lunar-COV19 ===
==== ARCT-021 and Starr ====
In response to the COVID-19 pandemic, Arcturus partnered with Duke–NUS Medical School to develop a COVID-19 vaccine using a combination of self-replicating mRNA with a Lunar delivery platform which increases the level and duration of expression of a therapeutic protein). The company also partnered with Catalent and Recipharm, contract development and manufacturing organizations, to manufacture multiple batches of Arcturus' COVID-19 mRNA vaccine candidate. Lunar-COV19 clinical trials in healthy volunteers began in July 2020. Phase 2 clinical trials were approved in the United States and Singapore by the FDA and HSA, respectively in December 2020.

==== Next-generations ====
On 2 August 2021, ARCT-154 started a clinical trial in Vietnam for next-generation development. The next day, the firm announced that the application of approval for the clinical trial Phase I/II in Singapore called ARCT-165. Also application of ARCT-154 for phase I/II. The vaccine was authorised in Japan in November 2023, and the European Union in February 2025.

Other projects

Lunar-CF is a project in collaboration with the Cystic Fibrosis Foundation to treat cystic fibrosis.

Lunar-FLU is a wholly owned program to protect against the influenza virus. Arcturus is combining its self-replicating mRNA Starr technology with Lunar to develop a prophylactic vaccine against influenza.

Lunar-GSD is a project in collaboration with Ultragenyx to treat glycogen storage disease type III.

Lunar-Rare is a project in collaboration with Ultragenyx to develop therapeutic candidates for rare disease targets.

Lunar-HBV is a project in collaboration with Janssen to develop medicines for the treatment of hepatitis B virus infection.

Lunar-NASH is a project in collaboration with Takeda to develop medicines for non-alcoholic steatohepatitis (NASH) and other gastrointestinal disorders.

Lunar-RPL is a project in collaboration with Synthetic Genomics to develop improved technology for vaccines and therapeutics.

Lunar-AH is a project in collaboration with Synthetic Genomics to develop infectious disease prophylactic vaccines.
