= List of COVID-19 vaccine authorizations =

In 2025, at least 50 COVID-19 vaccines have received authorization in one or more countries — meaning they have been approved, licensed, or granted emergency use authorization by national regulatory authorities around the world in 201 country.

Ten vaccines have been approved for emergency or full use by at least one stringent regulatory authority recognized by the World Health Organization (WHO): Pfizer–BioNTech, Oxford–AstraZeneca, Sinopharm BIBP, Moderna, Janssen, CoronaVac, Covaxin, Novavax, Convidecia, and Sanofi–GSK. Seven others are under assessment by the WHO: Sputnik V, Sinopharm WIBP, Abdala, Zifivax, Corbevax, COVIran Barekat, and SCB-2019.

Of the 50 vaccines, 16 have a full or emergency authorization in only one country, 12 in ten or fewer countries, and 12 in more than ten countries.

In some countries, vaccines may be authorized solely for travel purposes. They may not be approved for the general population. For example, the CoronaVac, Covishield, BBIBP-CorV and Covaxin vaccines are not part of Australia's national vaccination program; however, they are recognized for the purpose of travel to Australia.

== Overview maps ==
RNA vaccines and DNA vaccines
Pfizer–BioNTech (original)
Pfizer–BioNTech (omicron)
Moderna (original)
Moderna (omicron)
Others

Adenovirus vector vaccines
Oxford–AstraZeneca
Janssen
Sputnik V
Sputnik Light
Convidecia
iNCOVACC
Inactivated virus vaccines
Sinopharm BIBP
CoronaVac
Covaxin
Valneva
Sinopharm WIBP
Others

Subunit vaccines
Novavax
Sanofi–GSK
Abdala
EpiVacCorona
Zifivax
Soberana 02
Others

== Oxford–AstraZeneca ==
The Oxford–AstraZeneca COVID-19 vaccine, sold under the brand names Vaxzevria and Covishield, was a viral vector vaccine produced by the British University of Oxford, British-Swedish company AstraZeneca, and the Coalition for Epidemic Preparedness Innovations. Finland, Denmark, and Norway suspended the use of the Oxford–AstraZeneca vaccine due to a small number of reports of a rare blood clot disorder. Slovakia suspended its use after the death of a predisposed recipient. South Africa suspended its use because a small trial found only minimal protection against mild to moderate disease from the locally predominant Beta variant. Japan approved the vaccine for emergency use in May 2021, but did not plan to use them immediately because of rare cases of a blood clotting disorder reported overseas. Later, Japan started to use the vaccine for people aged 40 or over to mitigate the surge of the Delta variant in August. Finland ceased use of the vaccine as the last batch expired on 30 November 2021. Until then it was only offered for those aged 65 or more due to extremely rare coagulation disorders among younger recipients of the vaccine. After this Finland will not procure more of the vaccine. The AstraZeneca vaccine was the most widely accepted internationally, and the most popular in terms of total inoculated worldwide, over 1.3 billion. The AstraZeneca vaccine was administered in more countries than any other vaccine.

The vaccine is no longer in production. AstraZeneca withdrew its marketing authorizations for the vaccine from the European market in March 2024, and worldwide by May 2024.

Full (5)

1. Australia
2. Brazil
3. Canada
4. India
5. Israel

EMA countries

1. Austria
2. Belgium
3. Bulgaria
4. Croatia
5. Cyprus
6. Czech Republic
7. Denmark
8. Estonia
9. Finland
10. France
11. Germany
12. Greece
13. Hungary
14. Iceland
15. Ireland
16. Italy
17. Latvia
18. Liechtenstein
19. Lithuania
20. Luxembourg
21. Malta
22. Netherlands
23. Norway
24. Poland
25. Portugal
26. Romania
27. Slovakia
28. Slovenia
29. Spain
30. Sweden

Emergency (170)

1. Afghanistan
2. Albania
3. Algeria
4. Andorra
5. Angola
6. Argentina
7. Armenia
8. Azerbaijan
9. Bahrain
10. Bangladesh
11. Benin
12. Bhutan
13. Bolivia
14. Bosnia and Herzegovina
15. Botswana
16. Brunei
17. Burkina Faso
18. Cambodia
19. Cameroon
20. Cape Verde
21. Central African Republic
22. Chile
23. Colombia
24. Comoros
25. Congo-Brazzaville
26. Congo-Kinshasa
27. Costa Rica
28. Djibouti
29. Dominican Republic
30. East Timor
31. Ecuador
32. Egypt
33. El Salvador
34. Eswatini
35. Ethiopia
36. Fiji
37. Gambia
38. Georgia
39. Ghana
40. Guatemala
41. Guinea-Bissau
42. Guinea
43. Honduras
44. Indonesia
45. Iran
46. Iraq
47. Ivory Coast
48. Japan
49. Jordan
50. Kenya
51. Kiribati
52. Kosovo
53. Kuwait
54. Kyrgyzstan
55. Laos
56. Lebanon
57. Lesotho
58. Liberia
59. Libya
60. Madagascar
61. Malawi
62. Malaysia
63. Maldives
64. Mali
65. Mauritania
66. Mauritius
67. Mexico
68. Micronesia
69. Moldova
70. Mongolia
71. Montenegro
72. Morocco
73. Mozambique
74. Myanmar
75. Namibia
76. Nauru
77. Nepal
78. New Zealand
79. Nicaragua
80. Niger
81. Nigeria
82. North Macedonia
83. Oman
84. Pakistan
85. Palestine
86. Panama
87. Papua New Guinea
88. Paraguay
89. Peru
90. Philippines
91. Qatar
92. Rwanda
93. Samoa
94. São Tomé and Príncipe
95. Saudi Arabia
96. Senegal
97. Serbia
98. Seychelles
99. Sierra Leone
100. Singapore (restricted)
101. Solomon Islands
102. Somalia
103. South Korea
104. South Sudan
105. Sri Lanka
106. Sudan
107. Syria
108. Taiwan
109. Tajikistan
110. Thailand
111. Togo
112. Tonga
113. Tunisia
114. Turkmenistan
115. Tuvalu
116. Uganda
117. Ukraine
118. United Arab Emirates
119. United Kingdom
120. Uruguay
121. Uzbekistan
122. Vanuatu
123. Vietnam
124. Yemen
125. Zambia
126. Zimbabwe

CARPHA countries and entities

1. Antigua and Barbuda
2. Bahamas
3. Barbados
4. Belize
5. Dominica
6. Grenada
7. Guyana
8. Haiti
9. Jamaica
10. Saint Kitts and Nevis
11. Saint Lucia
12. Saint Vincent and the Grenadines
13. Suriname
14. Trinidad and Tobago

- Anguilla
- Aruba
- British Virgin Islands
- Bermuda
- Caribbean Netherlands
- Cayman Islands
- Curaçao
- Montserrat
- Sint Maarten
- Turks and Caicos Islands

Non-country entities

- Cook Islands
- Falkland Islands
- French Polynesia
- Greenland
- Guadeloupe
- Guernsey
- Isle of Man
- Jersey
- Northern Cyprus
- Pitcairn
- Saint Helena, Ascension and Tristan da Cunha
- Wallis and Futuna
- World Health Organization

Travel-only

- Hong Kong
- Switzerland
- United States

EMA countries

1. Austria
2. Belgium
3. Bulgaria
4. Croatia
5. Cyprus
6. Czech Republic
7. Denmark
8. Estonia
9. Finland
10. France
11. Germany
12. Greece
13. Hungary
14. Iceland
15. Ireland
16. Italy
17. Latvia
18. Liechtenstein
19. Lithuania
20. Luxembourg
21. Malta
22. Netherlands
23. Norway
24. Poland
25. Portugal
26. Romania
27. Slovakia
28. Slovenia
29. Spain
30. Sweden

== Pfizer–BioNTech ==
The Pfizer–BioNTech COVID-19 vaccine, sold under the brand name Comirnaty, is an mRNA vaccine produced by the German company BioNTech and the American company Pfizer. In Hong Kong, Macau, and Taiwan, Comirnaty is distributed by Fosun Pharma.

=== Original ===
Full (39)

1. Australia
2. Brazil
3. Canada
4. Marshall Islands (Note: via United States authorization through Compact of Free Association) (Note: Full approval only for those aged 12+. EUA still applies for recipients aged 6 months through 11 years.)
5. Micronesia
6. New Zealand
7. Palau
8. Saudi Arabia
9. Switzerland

EMA countries

1. Austria
2. Belgium
3. Bulgaria
4. Croatia
5. Cyprus
6. Czech Republic
7. Denmark
8. Estonia
9. Finland
10. France
11. Germany
12. Greece
13. Hungary
14. Iceland
15. Ireland
16. Italy
17. Latvia
18. Liechtenstein
19. Lithuania
20. Luxembourg
21. Malta
22. Netherlands
23. Norway
24. Poland
25. Portugal
26. Romania
27. Slovakia
28. Slovenia
29. Spain
30. Sweden

Non-country entities

- Hong Kong

Emergency (145)

1. Afghanistan
2. Albania
3. Algeria
4. Andorra
5. Argentina
6. Armenia
7. Azerbaijan
8. Bahrain
9. Bangladesh
10. Benin
11. Bhutan
12. Bolivia
13. Bosnia and Herzegovina
14. Botswana
15. Brunei
16. Cambodia
17. Cameroon
18. Cape Verde
19. Chile
20. China (For German citizens)
21. Colombia
22. Congo-Kinshasa
23. Costa Rica
24. Djibouti
25. Dominican Republic
26. East Timor
27. Ecuador
28. Egypt
29. El Salvador
30. Eswatini
31. Fiji
32. Gabon
33. Georgia
34. Ghana
35. Guatemala
36. Guinea
37. Honduras
38. Indonesia
39. Iraq
40. Israel
41. Ivory Coast
42. Japan
43. Jordan
44. Kazakhstan
45. Kenya
46. Kosovo
47. Kuwait
48. Kyrgyzstan
49. Laos
50. Lebanon
51. Libya
52. Malawi
53. Malaysia
54. Maldives
55. Mexico
56. Moldova
57. Monaco
58. Mongolia
59. Montenegro
60. Morocco
61. Namibia
62. Nepal
63. Nicaragua
64. Nigeria
65. North Macedonia
66. Oman
67. Pakistan
68. Palestine
69. Panama
70. Papua New Guinea
71. Paraguay
72. Peru
73. Philippines
74. Qatar
75. Rwanda
76. Samoa
77. San Marino
78. Serbia
79. Singapore
80. Somalia
81. South Africa
82. South Korea
83. Sri Lanka
84. Sudan
85. Syria
86. Taiwan
87. Tajikistan
88. Tanzania
89. Thailand
90. Tonga
91. Tunisia
92. Turkey
93. Uganda
94. Ukraine
95. United Arab Emirates
96. United Kingdom
97. Uruguay
98. Uzbekistan
99. Vatican City
100. Vietnam
101. Yemen
102. Zambia

CARPHA countries and entities

1. Antigua and Barbuda
2. Bahamas
3. Barbados
4. Belize
5. Dominica
6. Grenada
7. Guyana
8. Haiti
9. Jamaica
10. Saint Kitts and Nevis
11. Saint Lucia
12. Saint Vincent and the Grenadines
13. Suriname
14. Trinidad and Tobago

- Anguilla
- Aruba
- British Virgin Islands
- Bermuda
- Caribbean Netherlands
- Cayman Islands
- Curaçao
- Montserrat
- Sint Maarten
- Turks and Caicos Islands

Non-country entities

- American Samoa
- Cook Islands
- Faroe Islands
- French Polynesia
- Gibraltar
- Greenland
- Guadeloupe
- Guam
- Guernsey
- Isle of Man
- Jersey
- Macau
- Martinique
- New Caledonia
- Niue
- Northern Cyprus
- Northern Mariana Islands
- Puerto Rico
- Tokelau
- World Health Organization

=== Bivalent original–BA.1 ===
1. Japan

EMA countries

1. Austria
2. Belgium
3. Bulgaria
4. Croatia
5. Cyprus
6. Czech Republic
7. Denmark
8. Estonia
9. Finland
10. France
11. Germany
12. Greece
13. Hungary
14. Iceland
15. Ireland
16. Italy
17. Latvia
18. Liechtenstein
19. Lithuania
20. Luxembourg
21. Malta
22. Netherlands
23. Norway
24. Poland
25. Portugal
26. Romania
27. Slovakia
28. Slovenia
29. Spain
30. Sweden

Non-country entities

- World Health Organization

=== Bivalent original–BA.4/5 ===
1. Canada
2. China (For German citizens)

EMA countries

1. Austria
2. Belgium
3. Bulgaria
4. Croatia
5. Cyprus
6. Czech Republic
7. Denmark
8. Estonia
9. Finland
10. France
11. Germany
12. Greece
13. Hungary
14. Iceland
15. Ireland
16. Italy
17. Latvia
18. Liechtenstein
19. Lithuania
20. Luxembourg
21. Malta
22. Netherlands
23. Norway
24. Poland
25. Portugal
26. Romania
27. Slovakia
28. Slovenia
29. Spain
30. Sweden

Non-country entities

- Hong Kong
- Macau
- World Health Organization

=== XBB.1.5 ===
1. United States

=== JN.1 ===
1. United Kingdom

=== KP.2 ===
1. United States

== Janssen ==
The Janssen COVID-19 vaccine is a viral vector vaccine produced by Janssen Pharmaceutica (a subsidiary of Johnson & Johnson) and Beth Israel Deaconess Medical Center. It is also known as Johnson & Johnson COVID-19 Vaccine and as COVID-19 Vaccine Janssen. Three countries, Denmark, Finland, and Norway, discontinued the use of the Janssen vaccine in favor of other available vaccines due to a possible link between the vaccine and a rare blood clot disorder. The use of the Janssen adenovirus vector vaccine began in Finland in October 2021. It is only offered for those aged 65 and over because of a very rare risk of thrombosis in younger age groups. The United States began use of the Janssen vaccine in March 2021, but discouraged use in favor of other available vaccines in December 2021 due to the risk of a rare clotting disorder. The Janssen vaccine became unavailable in the United States in May 2023 after all existing doses expired.

Full (4)

1. Australia (not used)
2. Brazil
3. Canada
4. Switzerland

Emergency (132)

1. Afghanistan
2. Andorra
3. Argentina
4. Bahamas
5. Bahrain
6. Bangladesh
7. Benin
8. Bolivia
9. Botswana
10. Brunei
11. Burkina Faso
12. Cambodia
13. Cameroon
14. Central African Republic
15. Chile
16. Colombia
17. Congo-Kinshasa
18. Djibouti
19. Egypt
20. Eswatini
21. Ethiopia
22. Gabon
23. Ghana
24. Guinea
25. Honduras
26. India
27. Indonesia
28. Iran
29. Iraq
30. Ivory Coast
31. Jordan
32. Kenya
33. Kuwait
34. Laos
35. Lebanon
36. Lesotho
37. Liberia
38. Libya
39. Madagascar
40. Malawi
41. Malaysia
42. Maldives
43. Mali
44. Marshall Islands
45. Mauritania
46. Mexico
47. Micronesia
48. Moldova
49. Monaco
50. Morocco
51. Mozambique
52. Namibia
53. Nepal
54. New Zealand
55. Nicaragua
56. Nigeria
57. Oman
58. Pakistan
59. Palau
60. Palestine
61. Papua New Guinea
62. Peru
63. Philippines
64. Qatar
65. Rwanda
66. Saudi Arabia
67. Senegal
68. Singapore (restricted)
69. Somalia
70. South Africa
71. South Korea
72. South Sudan
73. Sudan
74. Syria
75. Taiwan (not used)
76. Tanzania
77. Thailand
78. Tunisia
79. Uganda
80. Ukraine
81. United Arab Emirates
82. United Kingdom
83. United States (no longer available as of May 7, 2023)
84. Vanuatu
85. Vietnam
86. Yemen
87. Zambia
88. Zimbabwe

EMA countries

1. Austria
2. Belgium
3. Bulgaria
4. Croatia
5. Cyprus
6. Czech Republic
7. Denmark
8. Estonia
9. Finland
10. France
11. Germany
12. Greece
13. Hungary
14. Iceland
15. Ireland
16. Italy
17. Latvia
18. Liechtenstein
19. Lithuania
20. Luxembourg
21. Malta
22. Netherlands
23. Norway
24. Poland
25. Portugal
26. Romania
27. Slovakia
28. Slovenia
29. Spain
30. Sweden

CARPHA countries and entities

1. Antigua and Barbuda
2. Bahamas
3. Barbados
4. Belize
5. Dominica
6. Grenada
7. Guyana
8. Haiti
9. Jamaica
10. Saint Kitts and Nevis
11. Saint Lucia
12. Saint Vincent and the Grenadines
13. Suriname
14. Trinidad and Tobago

- Anguilla
- Aruba
- British Virgin Islands
- Bermuda
- Caribbean Netherlands
- Cayman Islands
- Curaçao
- Montserrat
- Sint Maarten
- Turks and Caicos Islands

Non-country entities

- American Samoa
- French Polynesia
- Greenland
- Guam
- New Caledonia
- Northern Cyprus
- Northern Mariana Islands
- Puerto Rico
- Africa Regulatory Taskforce
- World Health Organization

Travel-only

- Hong Kong
- Japan
- Turkey

== Moderna ==
The Moderna COVID-19 vaccine, also known as Spikevax, is an mRNA vaccine produced by the American company Moderna, the U.S. National Institute of Allergy and Infectious Diseases, the U.S. Biomedical Advanced Research and Development Authority, and the Coalition for Epidemic Preparedness Innovations. The Moderna vaccine is not offered for men under 30 years of age in Finland as a precaution to reduce a very rare risk of myocarditis.

=== Original ===
Full (34)

1. Australia
2. Canada
3. Switzerland
4. United Kingdom

EMA countries

1. Austria
2. Belgium
3. Bulgaria
4. Croatia
5. Cyprus
6. Czech Republic
7. Denmark
8. Estonia
9. Finland
10. France
11. Germany
12. Greece
13. Hungary
14. Iceland
15. Ireland
16. Italy
17. Latvia
18. Liechtenstein
19. Lithuania
20. Luxembourg
21. Malta
22. Netherlands
23. Norway
24. Poland
25. Portugal
26. Romania
27. Slovakia
28. Slovenia
29. Spain
30. Sweden

Emergency (116)

1. Andorra
2. Argentina
3. Armenia
4. Bahrain
5. Bangladesh
6. Bhutan
7. Botswana
8. Bolivia
9. Brazil
10. Brunei
11. Cape Verde
12. Chile
13. Colombia
14. Congo-Brazzaville
15. Congo-Kinshasa
16. Djibouti
17. Egypt
18. El Salvador
19. Fiji
20. Ghana
21. Guatemala
22. Honduras
23. India
24. Indonesia
25. Iran
26. Iraq
27. Israel
28. Japan
29. Jordan
30. Kenya
31. Kuwait
32. Kyrgyzstan
33. Lebanon
34. Libya
35. Malawi
36. Malaysia
37. Maldives
38. Marshall Islands
39. Mexico
40. Micronesia
41. Moldova
42. Monaco
43. Mongolia
44. Morocco
45. Nepal
46. Nigeria
47. Oman
48. Pakistan
49. Palau
50. Palestine
51. Paraguay
52. Peru
53. Philippines
54. Qatar
55. Rwanda
56. Saudi Arabia
57. Serbia
58. Singapore
59. South Korea
60. Sri Lanka
61. Sudan
62. Syria
63. Taiwan
64. Tajikistan
65. Thailand
66. Tunisia
67. Uganda
68. Ukraine
69. United Arab Emirates
70. Uzbekistan
71. Vietnam
72. Yemen

CARPHA countries and entities

1. Antigua and Barbuda
2. Bahamas
3. Barbados
4. Belize
5. Dominica
6. Grenada
7. Guyana
8. Haiti
9. Jamaica
10. Saint Kitts and Nevis
11. Saint Lucia
12. Saint Vincent and the Grenadines
13. Suriname
14. Trinidad and Tobago

- Anguilla
- Aruba
- British Virgin Islands
- Bermuda
- Caribbean Netherlands
- Cayman Islands
- Curaçao
- Montserrat
- Sint Maarten
- Turks and Caicos Islands

Non-country entities

- American Samoa
- Faroe Islands
- Greenland
- Guadeloupe
- Guam
- Guernsey
- Isle of Man
- Jersey
- Northern Mariana Islands
- Puerto Rico
- Wallis and Futuna
- World Health Organization

Travel-only

- Hong Kong
- New Zealand
- Turkey

=== Bivalent original–BA.1 ===
1. Australia
2. Canada
3. Japan
4. Singapore
5. Switzerland
6. Taiwan
7. United Kingdom

EMA countries

1. Austria
2. Belgium
3. Bulgaria
4. Croatia
5. Cyprus
6. Czech Republic
7. Denmark
8. Estonia
9. Finland
10. France
11. Germany
12. Greece
13. Hungary
14. Iceland
15. Ireland
16. Italy
17. Latvia
18. Liechtenstein
19. Lithuania
20. Luxembourg
21. Malta
22. Netherlands
23. Norway
24. Poland
25. Portugal
26. Romania
27. Slovakia
28. Slovenia
29. Spain
30. Sweden

=== Bivalent original–BA.4/5 ===
1. Brazil
2. Taiwan

=== XBB.1.5 ===
1. Brazil
2. United States

=== JN.1 ===
1. European Union
2. Switzerland
3. Taiwan
4. United Kingdom

=== KP.2 ===
1. United States

== Sinopharm BIBP ==
The Sinopharm BIBP COVID-19 vaccine is an inactivated virus vaccine produced by the China National Pharmaceutical Group (Sinopharm) and its Beijing Institute of Biological Products.

Full (4)

1. Bahrain
2. China
3. Seychelles
4. United Arab Emirates

Emergency (111)

1. Afghanistan
2. Algeria
3. Angola
4. Argentina
5. Armenia
6. Bangladesh
7. Belarus
8. Bhutan
9. Bolivia
10. Bosnia and Herzegovina
11. Brazil
12. Brunei
13. Burkina Faso
14. Burundi
15. Cambodia
16. Cameroon
17. Cape Verde
18. Chad
19. Comoros
20. Congo-Brazzaville
21. Cuba
22. Djibouti
23. Dominican Republic
24. Egypt
25. El Salvador
26. Equatorial Guinea
27. Ethiopia
28. Gabon
29. Gambia
30. Georgia
31. Guinea-Bissau
32. Guinea
33. Hungary
34. Indonesia
35. Iran
36. Iraq
37. Ivory Coast
38. Jordan
39. Kazakhstan
40. Kenya
41. Kiribati
42. Kuwait
43. Kyrgyzstan
44. Laos
45. Lebanon
46. Lesotho
47. Libya
48. Madagascar
49. Malawi
50. Malaysia
51. Maldives
52. Mauritania
53. Mauritius
54. Mexico
55. Moldova
56. Mongolia
57. Montenegro
58. Morocco
59. Mozambique
60. Myanmar
61. Namibia
62. Nepal
63. Nicaragua
64. Niger
65. Nigeria
66. North Korea
67. North Macedonia
68. Oman
69. Pakistan
70. Palestine
71. Papua New Guinea
72. Paraguay
73. Peru
74. Philippines
75. Qatar
76. Rwanda
77. Senegal
78. Serbia
79. Sierra Leone
80. Singapore
81. Solomon Islands
82. Somalia
83. South Sudan
84. Sri Lanka
85. Sudan
86. Syria
87. Tanzania
88. Thailand
89. Tunisia
90. Turkmenistan
91. Vanuatu
92. Venezuela
93. Vietnam
94. Yemen
95. Zambia
96. Zimbabwe

CARPHA countries and entities

1. Antigua and Barbuda
2. Bahamas
3. Barbados
4. Belize
5. Dominica
6. Grenada
7. Guyana
8. Haiti
9. Jamaica
10. Saint Kitts and Nevis
11. Saint Lucia
12. Saint Vincent and the Grenadines
13. Suriname
14. Trinidad and Tobago

- Anguilla
- Aruba
- British Virgin Islands
- Bermuda
- Caribbean Netherlands
- Cayman Islands
- Curaçao
- Montserrat
- Sint Maarten
- Turks and Caicos Islands

Non-country entities

- Macau
- World Health Organization

Travel-only

- Andorra
- Australia
- Austria (only for entry)
- Bulgaria
- Canada
- Chile
- Costa Rica
- Croatia
- Cyprus
- Czech Republic (only for Hungarian citizens and EU nationals vaccinated in Hungary)
- Estonia (only if approved in a person's country of origin)
- Finland
- Greece
- Grenada
- Hong Kong
- Iceland
- Ireland
- Japan
- Latvia
- Liechtenstein
- New Zealand
- Oman
- Panama
- Portugal (only in Madeira)
- Qatar
- Saudi Arabia (for short visits, Hajj and Umrah only)
- Slovakia
- Slovenia
- South Korea
- Spain
- St. Kitts and Nevis
- St. Lucia
- St. Vincent and the Grenadines
- Sweden
- Switzerland
- The Netherlands
- Turkey
- Ukraine
- United Kingdom
- United States
- Uruguay (only if approved in a person's country of origin)

== Sputnik V ==
The Sputnik V COVID-19 vaccine is a viral vector vaccine produced by the Russian Gamaleya Research Institute of Epidemiology and Microbiology.

Full (3)

1. Russia
2. Turkmenistan
3. Uzbekistan

Emergency (76)

1. Albania
2. Algeria
3. Angola
4. Antigua and Barbuda
5. Argentina
6. Armenia
7. Azerbaijan
8. Bahrain
9. Bangladesh
10. Belarus
11. Bolivia
12. Bosnia and Herzegovina
13. Brazil (restricted)
14. Cambodia
15. Cameroon
16. Chile
17. Congo-Brazzaville
18. Djibouti
19. Ecuador
20. Egypt
21. Gabon
22. Gambia
23. Ghana
24. Guatemala
25. Guinea
26. Guyana
27. Honduras
28. Hungary
29. India
30. Indonesia
31. Iran
32. Iraq
33. Ivory Coast
34. Jordan
35. Kazakhstan
36. Kenya
37. Kyrgyzstan
38. Laos
39. Lebanon
40. Libya
41. Maldives
42. Mali
43. Mauritius
44. Mexico
45. Moldova
46. Mongolia
47. Montenegro
48. Morocco
49. Myanmar
50. Namibia
51. Nepal
52. Nicaragua
53. Nigeria
54. North Macedonia
55. Oman
56. Pakistan
57. Palestine
58. Panama
59. Paraguay
60. Peru
61. Philippines
62. Rwanda
63. Saint Vincent and the Grenadines
64. San Marino
65. Serbia
66. Seychelles
67. Sri Lanka
68. Syria
69. Tajikistan
70. Tanzania
71. Tunisia
72. Turkey (limited use)
73. United Arab Emirates
74. Venezuela
75. Vietnam
76. Zimbabwe

Non-country entities

- Abkhazia
- South Ossetia

Expired

- Slovakia

Rejected

- South Africa

Travel-only

- Australia
- Cyprus
- Estonia
- Greece
- Hong Kong
- Israel
- Malaysia
- New Zealand
- Saudi Arabia
- Slovenia
- St. Lucia
- Thailand

== CoronaVac ==
The CoronaVac COVID-19 vaccine is an inactivated virus vaccine produced by the Chinese company Sinovac Biotech.

Full (1)

1. China

Non-country entities

- Hong Kong

Emergency (71)

1. Afghanistan
2. Albania
3. Algeria
4. Argentina
5. Armenia
6. Azerbaijan
7. Bangladesh
8. Benin
9. Bolivia
10. Bosnia and Herzegovina
11. Botswana
12. Brazil
13. Cambodia
14. Chile
15. Colombia
16. Djibouti
17. Dominica
18. Dominican Republic
19. East Timor
20. Ecuador
21. Egypt
22. El Salvador
23. Equatorial Guinea
24. Fiji
25. Gabon
26. Georgia
27. Guinea
28. Guyana
29. Hungary
30. Indonesia
31. Iraq
32. Jordan
33. Kazakhstan
34. Kuwait
35. Laos
36. Lebanon
37. Libya
38. Malawi
39. Malaysia
40. Maldives
41. Mexico
42. Moldova
43. Morocco
44. Myanmar
45. Nepal
46. North Macedonia
47. Oman
48. Pakistan
49. Palestine
50. Panama
51. Paraguay
52. Philippines
53. Qatar
54. Rwanda
55. Saint Vincent and the Grenadines
56. Saudi Arabia
57. Singapore
58. Somalia
59. South Africa
60. Sri Lanka
61. Sudan
62. Syria
63. Tajikistan
64. Tanzania
65. Thailand
66. Togo
67. Trinidad and Tobago
68. Tunisia
69. Turkey
70. Turkmenistan
71. Uganda
72. Ukraine
73. United Arab Emirates
74. Uruguay
75. Uzbekistan
76. Venezuela
77. Yemen
78. Zimbabwe

Non-country entities

- Northern Cyprus
- World Health Organization

Travel-only

- Andorra
- Australia
- Austria (only for entry)
- Canada
- Costa Rica
- Croatia
- Cyprus
- Estonia (only if approved in a person's country of origin)
- Finland
- Greece
- Grenada
- Iceland
- Ireland
- Japan
- Liechtenstein
- Norway
- New Zealand
- Norway
- Palau
- Panama
- Portugal (only in Madeira)
- Slovakia
- Slovenia
- South Korea
- Spain
- St. Kitts and Nevis
- St. Lucia
- St. Vincent and the Grenadines
- Sweden
- Switzerland
- The Netherlands
- Ukraine
- United Arab Emirates
- United Kingdom
- United States
- Vietnam

== Novavax ==
The Novavax COVID-19 vaccine, sold under the brand names Nuvaxovid and Covovax, is a subunit COVID-19 vaccine candidate developed by Novavax and the Coalition for Epidemic Preparedness Innovations.

Full (4)

1. Australia
2. Canada
3. Japan
4. South Korea

Emergency (57)

1. Bangladesh
2. India
3. Indonesia
4. Monaco
5. New Zealand
6. Philippines
7. Singapore
8. South Africa
9. Switzerland
10. Thailand
11. Taiwan
12. United Kingdom
13. United States

EMA countries

1. Austria
2. Belgium
3. Bulgaria
4. Croatia
5. Cyprus
6. Czech Republic
7. Denmark
8. Estonia
9. Finland
10. France
11. Germany
12. Greece
13. Hungary
14. Iceland
15. Ireland
16. Italy
17. Latvia
18. Liechtenstein
19. Lithuania
20. Luxembourg
21. Malta
22. Netherlands
23. Norway
24. Poland
25. Portugal
26. Romania
27. Slovakia
28. Slovenia
29. Spain
30. Sweden

CARPHA countries and entities

1. Antigua and Barbuda
2. Bahamas
3. Barbados
4. Belize
5. Dominica
6. Grenada
7. Guyana
8. Haiti
9. Jamaica
10. Saint Kitts and Nevis
11. Saint Lucia
12. Saint Vincent and the Grenadines
13. Suriname
14. Trinidad and Tobago

- Anguilla
- Aruba
- British Virgin Islands
- Bermuda
- Caribbean Netherlands
- Cayman Islands
- Curaçao
- Montserrat
- Sint Maarten
- Turks and Caicos Islands

Non-country entities

- World Health Organization

Travel-only

- Hong Kong
- Palau
- Panama
- Switzerland
- Turkey
- United Arab Emirates
- United States (before emergency approval July 2022)

== Covaxin ==
Covaxin is an inactivated virus vaccine produced by the Indian company Bharat Biotech in collaboration with the Indian Council of Medical Research–National Institute of Virology.

Full (1)

1. India

Emergency (50)

1. Afghanistan
2. Bahrain
3. Botswana
4. Central African Republic
5. Comoros
6. Egypt
7. Ethiopia
8. Guatemala (not used)
9. Iran
10. Iraq
11. Jordan
12. Kuwait
13. Lebanon
14. Libya
15. Malaysia
16. Mauritius
17. Mexico (not used)
18. Morocco
19. Myanmar
20. Nepal
21. Nicaragua (not used)
22. Oman
23. Pakistan
24. Paraguay
25. Philippines
26. Qatar
27. Somalia
28. Sudan
29. Syria
30. Tunisia
31. United Arab Emirates
32. Venezuela (not used)
33. Vietnam
34. Yemen
35. Zimbabwe

CARPHA countries and entities

1. Antigua and Barbuda
2. Bahamas
3. Barbados
4. Belize
5. Dominica
6. Grenada
7. Guyana (not used)
8. Haiti
9. Jamaica
10. Saint Kitts and Nevis
11. Saint Lucia
12. Saint Vincent and the Grenadines
13. Suriname
14. Trinidad and Tobago

- Anguilla
- Aruba
- British Virgin Islands
- Bermuda
- Caribbean Netherlands
- Cayman Islands
- Curaçao
- Montserrat
- Sint Maarten
- Turks and Caicos Islands

Non-country entities

- Palestine
- World Health Organization

Travel-only

- Andorra
- Australia
- Austria (only for entry)
- Canada
- Costa Rica
- Croatia
- Cyprus
- Estonia (only if approved in a person's country of origin)
- Finland
- Greece
- Hong Kong
- Iceland
- Ireland
- Japan
- Kyrgyzstan
- Liechtenstein
- Mongolia
- New Zealand
- Norway
- Oman
- Palestine
- Palau
- Panama
- Portugal (only in Madeira)
- Saudi Arabia
- Singapore
- Slovakia
- Slovenia
- South Korea
- Spain
- Sri Lanka
- Sweden
- Switzerland
- Thailand
- The Netherlands
- Turkey
- Ukraine
- United Kingdom
- United States

== VLA2001 ==
VLA2001 is an inactivated vaccine developed by Valneva SE and Dynavax Technologies.

Full (1)

1. United Kingdom

Emergency

1. Bahrain
2. United Arab Emirates

EMA countries

1. Austria
2. Belgium
3. Bulgaria
4. Croatia
5. Cyprus
6. Czech Republic
7. Denmark
8. Estonia
9. Finland
10. France
11. Germany
12. Greece
13. Hungary
14. Iceland
15. Ireland
16. Italy
17. Latvia
18. Liechtenstein
19. Lithuania
20. Luxembourg
21. Malta
22. Netherlands
23. Norway
24. Poland
25. Portugal
26. Romania
27. Slovakia
28. Slovenia
29. Spain
30. Sweden

Travel-only

- Malaysia
- New Zealand
- Turkey

== Sanofi–GSK ==
The Sanofi–GSK COVID-19 vaccine, sold under the brand name VidPrevtyn Beta, is a subunit vaccine developed by Sanofi Pasteur and GSK plc. It is based on the SARS-CoV-2 Beta variant.

EMA countries (as booster only)

1. Austria
2. Belgium
3. Bulgaria
4. Croatia
5. Cyprus
6. Czech Republic
7. Denmark
8. Estonia
9. Finland
10. France
11. Germany
12. Greece
13. Hungary
14. Iceland
15. Ireland
16. Italy
17. Latvia
18. Liechtenstein
19. Lithuania
20. Luxembourg
21. Malta
22. Netherlands
23. Norway
24. Poland
25. Portugal
26. Romania
27. Slovakia
28. Slovenia
29. Spain
30. Sweden

== Sputnik Light ==
Sputnik Light is a viral vector vaccine, produced by the Russian Gamaleya Research Institute of Epidemiology and Microbiology. It consists of the first dose of the Sputnik V vaccine, which is based on the Ad26 vector.

Full (0)

Emergency (28)

1. Angola
2. Argentina
3. Armenia
4. Bahrain
5. Belarus
6. Benin
7. Cambodia
8. Congo-Brazzaville
9. Egypt
10. Iran
11. India
12. Kazakhstan
13. Kyrgyzstan
14. Laos
15. Mauritius
16. Mongolia
17. Nicaragua
18. Palestine
19. Philippines
20. Russia
21. Saint Vincent and the Grenadines
22. San Marino
23. Syria
24. Tanzania
25. Tunisia
26. Turkmenistan
27. United Arab Emirates
28. Venezuela

Non-country entities

- Abkhazia
- Donbass Region (unofficially)

Travel-only

- Malaysia
- New Zealand
- Turkey

== Convidecia ==
Convidecia is a viral vector vaccine produced by the Chinese company CanSino Biologics and the Beijing Institute of Biotechnology of the Academy of Military Medical Sciences.

Full (1)

1. China

Emergency (9)

1. Argentina
2. Chile
3. Ecuador
4. Hungary
5. Indonesia
6. Malaysia
7. Mexico
8. Moldova
9. Pakistan

Non-country entities

- World Health Organization

Travel-only

- Hong Kong
- Japan
- New Zealand
- Turkey

== Sinopharm WIBP ==
The Sinopharm WIBP COVID-19 vaccine is an inactivated virus vaccine produced by the China National Pharmaceutical Group (Sinopharm) and its Wuhan Institute of Biological Products.

Full (1)

1. China

Emergency (5)

1. Armenia
2. North Macedonia
3. Peru
4. Philippines
5. United Arab Emirates
6. Venezuela

Travel-only

- Hong Kong
- Malaysia
- New Zealand
- Turkey

== Abdala ==
Abdala is a subunit vaccine developed by the Center for Genetic Engineering and Biotechnology in Cuba.

Full (0)

Emergency (6)

1. Cuba
2. Mexico
3. Nicaragua
4. St. Vincent and the Grenadines
5. Venezuela
6. Vietnam

Travel-only

- Cambodia
- Colombia
- Guyana
- Malaysia
- New Zealand
- St. Lucia
- Turkey
- Uruguay (only if accepted in the country of the person's origin)

== EpiVacCorona ==
EpiVacCorona is a peptide vaccine produced by the Russian State Research Center of Virology and Biotechnology VECTOR.

Full (1)

1. Turkmenistan

Emergency (4)

1. Belarus
2. Cambodia
3. Russia
4. Venezuela

Travel-only

- Malaysia
- New Zealand
- Turkey

== Zifivax ==
Zifivax is a subunit vaccine produced by the Chinese company Anhui Zhifei Longcom Biopharmaceutical.

Full (0)

Emergency (5)

1. China
2. Colombia
3. Indonesia
4. Pakistan
5. Uzbekistan

Travel-only

- Hong Kong
- Malaysia
- New Zealand
- Turkey

== Soberana 02 ==
Soberana 02, is a conjugate vaccine developed by the Finlay Institute in Cuba.

Full (0)

Emergency (4)

1. Cuba
2. Iran
3. Nicaragua
4. Venezuela

Travel-only

- Guyana
- Hungary
- Malaysia
- New Zealand
- Turkey

== CoviVac ==
CoviVac is an inactivated virus vaccine produced by the Chumakov Centre at the Russian Academy of Sciences.

Full (0)

Emergency (3)

1. Belarus
2. Cambodia
3. Russia

Travel-only

- Malaysia
- New Zealand
- Turkey

== QazCovid-in ==
QazCovid-in, also known as QazVac, is an inactivated virus vaccine developed by the Research Institute for Biological Safety Problems in Kazakhstan.

Full (0)

Emergency (2)

1. Kazakhstan
2. Kyrgyzstan

Travel-only

- Malaysia
- New Zealand
- Turkey

== Minhai ==
Minhai COVID-19 vaccine, is an inactivated virus vaccine developed by Minhai Biotechnology Co. and Shenzhen Kangtai Biological Products Co. Ltd. in China.

Full (0)

Emergency (2)

1. China
2. Indonesia

Travel-only

- Hong Kong
- Malaysia
- New Zealand
- Turkey

== Medigen ==
MVC-COV1901, is a protein subunit vaccine developed by Taiwan's Medigen Vaccine Biologics and Dynavax Technologies.

Full (0)

Emergency (3)

1. Eswatini
2. Taiwan
3. Paraguay

Non-country entities

1. Somaliland

Travel-only

- Belize
- Indonesia
- Malaysia
- New Zealand
- Palau
- Thailand
- Turkey

== Corbevax ==
Corbevax is a protein subunit vaccine developed by Texas Children's Hospital at the Baylor College of Medicine in Houston, Texas, and licensed to Indian biopharmaceutical firm Biological E. Limited (BioE) for development and production.

Full (0)

Emergency (2)

1. India
2. Botswana

Travel-only

- Malaysia
- New Zealand
- Turkey

== COVIran Barekat ==
COVIran Barekat, is an inactivated virus vaccine developed by Shifa Pharmed Industrial Co. in Iran.

Full (0)

Emergency (2)

1. Iran
2. Nicaragua

Travel-only

- Malaysia
- New Zealand
- Hungary
- Turkey

== Chinese Academy of Medical Sciences ==
Chinese Academy of Medical Sciences COVID-19 vaccine, is an inactivated virus vaccine developed by Chinese Academy of Medical Sciences.

Full (0)

Emergency (1)

1. China

Travel-only

- Hong Kong
- New Zealand
- Turkey

== ZyCoV-D ==
ZyCoV-D, is a DNA plasmid based COVID-19 vaccine developed by the Indian pharmaceutical company Cadila Healthcare with support from the Biotechnology Industry Research Assistance Council.

Full (0)

Emergency (1)

1. India

Travel-only

- Malaysia
- New Zealand
- Turkey

== FAKHRAVAC ==
FAKHRAVAC (or MIVAC), is an inactivated virus vaccine developed in Iran by the Organization of Defensive Innovation and Research, an organization of Iran's Ministry of Defense.

Full (0)

Emergency (1)

1. Iran

Travel-only

- Hungary
- Malaysia
- New Zealand
- Turkey

== COVAX-19 ==
COVAX-19, also known as SpikoGen, is a protein subunit vaccine jointly developed by Australian-based company Vaxine and Iran-based company CinnaGen.

Full (0)

Emergency (1)

1. Iran

Travel-only

- Hungary
- Malaysia
- New Zealand
- Turkey

== Razi Cov Pars ==
Razi Cov Pars is a protein subunit vaccine developed by Razi Vaccine and Serum Research Institute.

Full (0)

Emergency (1)

1. Iran

Travel-only

- Hungary
- Malaysia
- New Zealand
- Turkey

== Turkovac ==
Turkovac is an inactivated vaccine developed by Health Institutes of Turkey and Erciyes University.

Full (0)

Emergency (1)

1. Turkey

Travel-only

- Malaysia
- New Zealand

== Sinopharm CNBG ==
Sinopharm CNBG COVID-19 vaccine (NVSI) is a recombinant protein subunit vaccine developed by the National Vaccine & Serum Institute (NVSI, 中生研究院), a subsidiary of China National Biotec Group (CNBG), which in turn is a subsidiary of Sinopharm.

Full (0)

Emergency (1)

1. United Arab Emirates

Travel-only

- Malaysia
- Turkey

== Soberana Plus ==
Soberana Plus is a single-dose of conjugate vaccine developed by the Finlay Institute in Cuba.

Full (0)

Emergency (2)

1. Belarus
2. Cuba

Travel-only

- Guyana
- Malaysia
- New Zealand
- Turkey

== CoVLP ==
CoVLP is a virus-like particle vaccine grown in an Australian weed, Nicotiana benthamiana. It was developed by Medicago, and is marketed under the name Covifenz.

Full (1)

1. Canada

Emergency (0)

Travel-only

- Malaysia
- New Zealand
- Turkey

== Noora ==
Noora is a protein-based vaccine developed by the Baqiyatallah University of Medical Sciences.

Full (0)

Emergency (1)

1. Iran

Travel-only

- Malaysia
- Turkey

== SKYCovione ==
SKYCovione is a protein subunit vaccine developed by SK Bioscience.

Full (0)

Emergency (1)

1. South Korea

== Walvax ==
Walvax COVID-19 vaccine is an RNA vaccine developed by Walvax Biotechnology, Suzhou Abogen Biosciences, and the PLA Academy of Military Science.

Full (0)

Emergency (1)

1. Indonesia

== iNCOVACC ==
iNCOVACC, also called BBV154 is an adenovirus vector vaccine developed by Bharat Biotech, Precision Virologics, and Washington University School of Medicine.

Full (0)

Emergency (1)

1. India

== Gemcovac ==
Gemcovac, or GEMCOVAC-19, is a self-amplifying mRNA vaccine manufactured by Gennova Biopharmaceuticals.

Full (0)

Emergency (1)

1. India

== V-01 ==
V-01 is a protein subunit vaccine developed by Livzon Mabpharm.

Full (0)

Emergency (1)

1. China

== IndoVac ==
IndoVac is a protein subunit vaccine developed by Indonesian pharmaceutical company Bio Farma and Baylor College of Medicine.

Full (0)

Emergency (1)

1. Indonesia
