= COVID-19 pandemic in Cuba =

Ongoing COVID-19 viral pandemic in Cuba

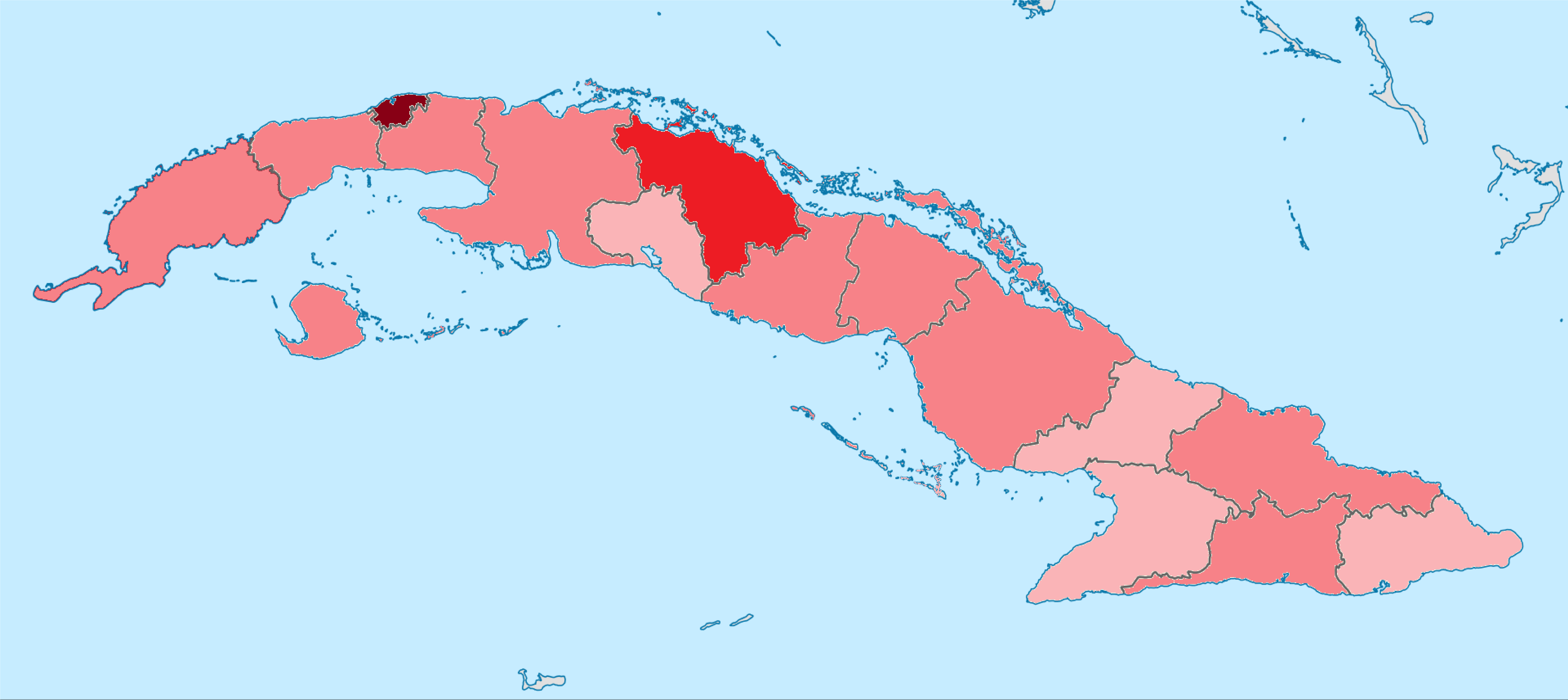
- Disease: COVID-19
- Pathogen: SARS-CoV-2
- Location: Cuba
- Index case: Trinidad
- Arrival date: 24 February 2020 (6 years, 8 months and 4 days)
- Confirmed cases: 1,039,842
- Active cases: 14,481
- Recovered: 1,016,971
- Deaths: 8,390

Government website
- https://covid19cubadata.github.io/#cuba

The COVID-19 pandemic in Cuba was a part of the worldwide pandemic of coronavirus disease 2019 (COVID-19) caused by severe acute respiratory syndrome coronavirus 2 (SARS-CoV-2). The virus was confirmed to have spread to Cuba on 11 March 2020 when three Italian tourists tested positive for the virus.

== Background ==
On 12 January 2020, the World Health Organization (WHO) confirmed that a novel coronavirus was the cause of a respiratory illness in a cluster of people in Wuhan, Hubei, China, which was reported to the WHO on 31 December 2019.

Cuba faced multiple domestic challenges in its response to the pandemic. Health professionals faced challenges including shortages of medical supplies, poor sanitary conditions, and low wages. Cuba also has one of the oldest populations in the Americas and one quarter of the population is considered at-risk. Additionally, Cuba's economy was suffering due to the global decrease in tourism amid the pandemic. As a consequence, the government increased centralization of the economy in an effort to prevent a deeper economic crisis like the one experienced by the country after the end of the Cold War.

Cuba's policy of "medical internationalism" has played a prominent role in the country's response to the COVID-19 crisis. Cuba sent medical personnel to the hardest-hit Italian wealthy region of Lombardy, as well as Angola and a dozen Caribbean states including Suriname.

"COVID-19" written into cement in Trinidad, Cuba

Cuba engaged effective COVID-19 preventive measures, and despite the concurrent economic crisis and shortages of consumer products, in July 2020 officials reported that during the first wave of the pandemic the country's population suffered only minimal losses. Regular testing, wearing of face masks, and health visits by nursing professionals kept the reported case loads and mortality rates lower than in most countries of the Americas.

In mid-July 2021, Cuba experienced the first real wave of infections when the SARS-CoV-2 Delta variant spread throughout the nation. Subsequently, demonstrations took place in a number of cities when thousands took to the streets protesting against COVID-related restrictions. The island suffered from an acute shortage of consumer goods and medical supplies during a severe economic downturn.

Cuba manufactures two COVID-19 vaccines, at the Center for Genetic Engineering and Biotechnology and Finlay Institute. As of 31 August 2021 about 75 million doses had been produced.

== Timeline ==
Cases

Deaths

=== March 2020 ===
On 11 March, the first three cases in Cuba were confirmed. The patients were Italian tourists. They were kept in isolation at the Pedro Kouri Tropical Medicine Institute in Havana.

The government urged citizens to make their own face masks, while the textile industry was drafted to fabricate them. People were advised to carry several cloth face masks with them, depending on how many hours they plan to spend in public areas.

On 12 March, a fourth confirmed case was announced. This was a Cuban, whose wife had arrived from Milan, Italy on 24 February, and who had started showing symptoms on 27 February. The husband had begun to show symptoms by 8 March. Both were tested and he was positive. The wife was stated to be negative because the disease had run its course.

On 16 March, the cruise ship MS Braemar, with over 1,000 passengers and crew on board, was given permission to berth in Cuba after being rejected by the Bahamas. At least five passengers have tested positive for coronavirus (COVID-19). British citizens were able to take flights home after both governments reached an agreement on their repatriation.

On 17 March, the number of confirmed cases increased to 7.

On 18 March, the number of confirmed cases increased to 10, and the first death was announced, a 61-year old Italian who had been one of the first three confirmed.

On 19 March, the number of confirmed cases increased to 16.

On 20 March, the number of confirmed cases increased to 21. Also, it was announced that Cuba will restrict entry to residents with effect from 24 March. Only Cuban residents may enter, that is, if they have not been outside of Cuba for more than 24 months; as well as foreigners residing on the island.

On 22 March, the Ministry of Public Health (MINSAP) of Cuba raised the number of coronavirus infections on the island to 35 but were monitoring more than 950 suspected cases, according to information published by the state agency on its website.

On 23 March, authorities in Cuba raised the number of coronavirus patients to 48.

On 24 March, the Cuban government closed all schools until at least 20 April.

Visitors who arrived between 17 and 23 March were required to be tested for the coronavirus.

As of 30 March, the number of confirmed coronavirus cases was at 170, with 4 deaths.

=== April 2020 ===
With effect from midnight on 1 April, Cuba suspended the arrival of all international flights.

On 4 April, authorities in Cuba raised the number of coronavirus patients to 288.

As of 15 April, there were 755 cases of COVID-19 in Cuba, there were 18,856 total tests done so far

=== May 2020 ===
As of 12 May, new cases had fallen to less than 20 per day, and a program of mass testing was beginning.

As of 30 May, the city of Havana represented slightly more than half of the total confirmed cases.

=== June 2020 ===
On June 18, 2020, the Cuban government started to set out a reopening plan with all the provinces, except Havana and Matanzas, being put in a first phase of recovery. Provinces in phase 1 would be able to reopen restaurants, bars, gyms, swimming pools, and beaches with capacity limits and social distancing measures being put in place. As of Friday, June 19, there were 2305 confirmed cases of COVID-19 in Cuba with 85 associated fatalities.

=== July 2020 ===
On Friday, July 3 the Cuban government announced that they would ease more COVID-19 measures with Havana entering phase one of three-phase process. Residents would be permitted to travel on public or private transport, go to the beach, visit bars and restaurants, and go to recreation centers. Social distancing would remain in force and wearing face masks would continue to be mandatory. The rest of the country entered phase two on the same date, with larger gatherings permitted and limited tourism and transportation resuming.

=== August 2020 ===
On Saturday, August 8, Cuban authorities reimposed strict lockdown measures in Havana due to a new spike in COVID-19 cases. Under the lockdown rules, bars, restaurants, pools, and beaches would be closed, and public transport would be suspended. This was due to 59 new confirmed cases of the virus, mainly within Havana.

== Statistics ==
=== Cumulative number of confirmed cases and deaths ===
View source data.

=== Confirmed new cases per day ===
View source data.

=== Confirmed deaths per day ===
View source data.

== Vaccination ==
While the Cuban government initially aimed to achieve widespread vaccination solely with homegrown vaccines, it later went on to use the Sinopharm BIBP vaccine as well. Cuba has developed two vaccines that have entered phase III trials worldwide. The vaccines Soberana 02 and Abdala, are being used for a mass vaccination campaign that aims to vaccinate 1.7 million Cubans in Havana. From the beginning of the campaign vaccine hesitancy seemed to be low, as thousands of Cubans were vaccinated voluntarily as part of clinical studies and 150,000 health care workers got vaccinated as part of an "interventional study". The US embargo against Cuba significantly slowed down the process of developing vaccines, as it restricted the medical equipment the island could import. Some Cuban research teams relied on only one spectrometer, which is a machine that can analyse a vaccine's chemical structure. In spite of their relatively slow development process, Cuba aims to manufacture 100 million doses of Soberana 02 in 2021 to cover its population and to export the surplus. On June 21, 2021, Cuba reported that its Abdala vaccine is 92.28% effective against COVID-19.

Widespread vaccination has been limited by a lack of syringes, which the country does not produce, and vaccine doses. In July 2021, representatives of the humanitarian organisation Global Health Partners announced the successful donation of six million syringes to Cuba for their COVID-19 vaccination campaign. The donation was financed by a coalition of American organisations against the American embargo on Cuba, CODEPINK, The People’s Forum, the International Longshore and Warehouse Union, Democratic Socialists of America, and the Cuban-American groups No Embargo Cuba Movement and Puentes de Amor. Cuba had already received around 380,000 syringes and needles in June 2021, donated by Cuban residents in Argentina and other aid organisations.

According to Cuba's state news agency, by November 2021 8,679,636 people in Cuba, 77.6 percent of the population, were fully vaccinated.

== See also ==
- COVID-19 pandemic in North America
- COVID-19 pandemic by country
- 2020 in the Caribbean
- Influx of disease in the Caribbean
- HIV/AIDS in Latin America
- 2013–2014 chikungunya outbreak
- 2009 swine flu pandemic
- 2019–2020 dengue fever epidemic
