= Soberana Plus =

Vaccine

- A vial of Soberana Plus

Vaccine description
- Target: SARS-CoV-2
- Vaccine type: Conjugate

Clinical data
- Trade names: Pasteur
- Other names: FINLAY-FR-1A
- Routes of administration: Intramuscular

Legal status
- Legal status: Full list of Soberana Plus authorizations

Identifiers
- CAS Number: 2695520-51-3

Soberana Plus, technical name FINLAY-FR-1A, is a COVID-19 candidate vaccine produced by the Finlay Institute, a Cuban epidemiological research institute.

== Medical uses ==
It can be used as a third (booster) dose for Soberana 02 vaccine at eight weeks. It's also studied as an independent single-dose vaccine.

=== Efficacy ===
It combined the Soberana 02, the vaccine booster shot shows an efficacy of 91.2%. The final result of a third dose of Soberana Plus increased the efficacy up to 92.4%. Efficacy against severe disease and death is 100% for the heterologous three-dose regimen.

== Clinical trials ==
=== Booster dose ===
Soberana Plus has also been studied as a booster dose for Soberana 02.

=== Single dose ===
Clinical trials of single-dose Soberana Plus
Phase	Registration		Number of participants			Age of participants
Phase	ID	Date	Total	Vaccine	Control	Age of participants
I	RPCEC00000349	2021-01-05	30	30	0	18-55 years
IIa	RPCEC00000366	2021-04-09	20	20	0	19-80 years
IIb	RPCEC00000366	2021-04-09	430		Placebo-controlled	19-80 years

== Authorizations ==
On 20 August 2021, Cuba approved Soberana Plus as a booster after two doses of Soberana 02. On 23 September, Cuba approved Soberana Plus for COVID-19 survivors over 19 years old. On 7 December, the authorization was expanded to include COVID-19 survivors from 2 to 18 years old.

== See also ==
- Soberana 02
