= Soberana =

Soberana may refer to:

== Alcohol ==
- Soberana, a beer from Panama

== Medicine ==
- FINLAY-FR-2, COVID-19 vaccine candidate, also known as SOBERANA-02, which followed the earlier SOBERANA-01, produced by the Finlay Institute, a Cuban epidemiological research institute.
