= Abdala (vaccine) =

Vaccine against COVID-19

Vaccine description
- Target: SARS-CoV-2
- Vaccine type: Protein subunit

Clinical data
- Other names: ABDALA
- Routes of administration: Intramuscular

Legal status
- Legal status: Full and emergency authorizations; Full list of Abdala authorizations

Identifiers
- CAS Number: 2696238-04-5

Abdala, technical name CIGB-66, is a COVID-19 vaccine developed by the Center for Genetic Engineering and Biotechnology in Cuba. This candidate, named after a patriotic drama by Cuban independence hero José Martí, is a protein subunit vaccine containing COVID-derived proteins that trigger an immune response. The full results of the clinical trial have not yet been published. This candidate followed a previous one called CIGB-669 (MAMBISA).

The vaccine is one of two Cuba-developed COVID-19 vaccines which has passed Phase III trials, and has received emergency authorisation.

== Medical uses ==
The vaccine was administered in 3 doses spaced 2 weeks apart.

=== Efficacy ===
On 22 June 2021, official Cuban government sources reported that the results of an initial study by the Cuban Center for Genetic Engineering and Biotechnology involving 48,290 participants found a 92.28% efficacy rate at preventing symptomatic COVID-19. The report included a confidence interval of 85.74%–95.817% without a specified confidence level; analysis was based on 153 cases of symptomatic COVID, 142 of which were in the placebo group and 11 of which were in the approximately equal vaccinated group.

The measure of efficacy includes the initial strain of SARS-COV-2 as well as variants that were present in Cuba during the study, including Alpha, Beta, and Gamma strains. The Beta variant entered Cuba in January 2021 and became the predominant strain in Cuba, fuelling a rise in COVID cases.

As of 28 June 2021, Cuba has not yet released detailed information about the vaccine to the WHO or to the general public via a pre-print or a scientific article. It is planned to do so after the Cuba Health Agency (CECMED) authorises the vaccine for emergency use.

In September 2022, a study published in The Lancet Regional Health - Americas reported that the estimated vaccine effectiveness against severe illness was 93.3% in partially vaccinated individuals and 98.2% in those fully vaccinated; effectiveness against death was 94.1% and 98.7%, respectively. Effectiveness exceeded 92.0% across all age groups. The retrospective, real-world study was conducted during the Delta variant wave in Cuba, and the effectiveness against Omicron or subsequent variants remains unknown.

== Vaccine design ==
The vaccine was designed by researchers from the Center for Genetic Engineering and Biotechnology and has been described in a pre-print submission. The Abdala vaccine reportedly consists of a monomeric receptor binding domain subunit, residues 331-530 of the Spike protein of SARS-CoV-2 strain 156 Wuhan-Hu-1, expressed in the yeast Pichia pastoris at 30–40 mg/L fermentation yield. The vaccine antigen is polyhistidine-tagged to aid purification and is reportedly purified via immobilised metal affinity chromatography and subsequent hydrophobic interaction chromatography to >98% purity. For animal studies 50 μg of vaccine antigen per dose was adjuvanted with 0.3 mg aluminium hydroxide gel (Alhydrogel) and delivered in 500 μL phosphate buffer.

== Manufacturing ==
Venezuela claimed that it would manufacture the vaccine but, as of 2 May 2021, the claim had not yet materialised. State-owned EspromedBIO will manufacture the vaccine but some "arrangements" are needed to start production. In April, Nicolás Maduro said that a capacity of 2 million doses per month is hoped to be reached by August or September 2021. In June 2021, Vietnam's Ministry of Health announced that negotiations were ongoing between Cuba and Vietnam for Abdala vaccine production. The Institute of Vaccines and Medical Biologicals (IVAC) was named as the focal point for receiving technology transfer.

== History ==
=== Clinical trials ===
In July 2020, Abdala commenced phase I/II clinical trials.

The Phase III trial compares 3 doses of the vaccine administered at 0, 14 and 28 days against a placebo, with the primary outcome measuring the proportion of cases reported for each group 14 days after the third dose. The trial was registered on 18 March 2021. The first dose was administered on 22 March and by April 4, the 48,000 participants had received their first dose, and second doses started being administered from April 5. Third doses have started being administered on 19 April and on May 1, adherence to the three-dose protocol was over 97%.

In July 2021, Abdala started clinical trial phase I/II for children and adolescents aged 3-18.

==== Intervention study ====
124,000 people aged 19 to 80 received 3 doses of the vaccine as part of an intervention study, with the primary outcome measuring the proportion of cases and deaths for the vaccinated compared to the unvaccinated population.

A wider intervention study with the 1.7 million inhabitants of Havana is expected to start in May with the Abdala and Soberana 2 vaccine.

=== Authorizations ===
On 9 July 2021, Abdala was approved for emergency use in Cuba.

On 18 September 2021, Abdala was approved for emergency use in Vietnam.

On 16 December 2021, the Ministry of Health of Saint Vincent and the Grenadines announced that the Abdala vaccine was available at vaccination sites across the island. This announcement follows a donation of vaccines made by the Cuban government on 13 December 2021.

On 29 December 2021, Abdala was approved for emergency use in Mexico.

== Distribution ==
On 24 June 2021, Vice President of Venezuela Delcy Rodríguez announced that Venezuela had signed a contract for 12 million doses of the vaccine, and that these doses are to arrive in "the coming months". The first shipment of Abdala arrived in Venezuela the day following this announcement.

On 20 September, 2021, The Vietnamese Government has issued a resolution on purchase of 10 million doses of Abdala COVID-19 vaccine.
