= Turkovac =

Vaccine against COVID-19

Vaccine description
- Target: SARS-CoV-2
- Vaccine type: Inactivated

Clinical data
- Other names: Erucov-Vac
- Routes of administration: Intramuscular

Legal status
- Legal status: Full list of Turkovac authorizations

Identifiers
- CAS Number: 2695585-27-2

Turkovac (pronunciation: ['tɜ:rkəvæk]) is a COVID-19 vaccine developed by Turkish Ministry of Health and Erciyes University.

== Clinical trials ==
In November 2020, Turkovac started on phase I trials with 44 participants in Turkey.

In February 2021, Turkovac started on phase II trials with 250 participants in Turkey.

In June 2021, Turkovac started on phase III trials with 40,800 participants in Turkey. As of 2023 phase III trials continue.

== Authorization ==
On 25 November 2021, the Turkish Minister of Health reported that Turkovac's application for emergency use authorization had been filed. On 22 December, Turkish President Recep Tayyip Erdogan announced the emergency use approval of Turkovac.
