= NicVAX =

Experimental nicotine dependency vaccine

NicVAX is an experimental conjugate vaccine intended to reduce or eliminate physical dependence to nicotine. According to the U.S. National Institute of Drug Abuse, NicVAX can potentially be used to inoculate against nicotine addiction. This proprietary vaccine is being developed by Nabi Biopharmaceuticals of Rockville, MD. with the support from the U.S. National Institute on Drug Abuse. NicVAX consists of the hapten 3'-aminomethylnicotine which has been conjugated (attached) to Pseudomonas aeruginosa exotoxin A.

Early trials of NicVax were promising; two successive phase III trials showed results no better than placebo, and a more recent study showed that the drug decreased subjects' cravings for cigarettes.

== Mechanism ==
Nicotine is a small molecule that, after inhalation into the lungs, quickly passes into the bloodstream, subsequently crossing the blood–brain barrier. Once in the brain, it binds to specific nicotine receptors, resulting in the release of neurotransmitters, such as dopamine and norepinephrine.

NicVAX is a relapse prevention therapy designed to stimulate the immune system to produce antibodies that bind to nicotine in the bloodstream and prevent and/or slow it from crossing the blood–brain barrier and entering the brain. With a reduced amount of nicotine reaching the brain, neurotransmitter release is greatly lessened and the pleasurable, positive-reinforcing effects of nicotine are diminished. Pre-clinical studies with the vaccine have shown that vaccination slows and decreases the amount of nicotine that reaches the brain and blocks the effects of nicotine, including effects that can reinforce and maintain addiction in animals. Therefore, if a recently quit tobacco smoker is vaccinated and has a tobacco cigarette after the immunization series is completed, the antibodies generated by the vaccine bind nicotine and alter its distribution into the brain. Because not enough nicotine enters the brain, addiction-relevant neural pathways are not activated. No pleasure is derived from the tobacco cigarette and the vaccinated subject does not relapse and begin smoking again.

NicVAX is administered by injection into the arm; the 3'-aminomethylnicotine molecule found in the vaccine instigates an immune response in which 'nicotine' antibodies are created. The antibodies bind to nicotine molecules, causing the nicotine-antibody complexes to be too large to enter the brain; this prevents nicotine from being able to affect addiction-relevant pathways in the brain. The idea behind the drug is that since often even a single cigarette can deliver enough nicotine to the brain to reinstate the addiction, blocking the entry of nicotine into the brain might prevent this renewed dependence. This treatment works for nicotine addiction from any source. Clinical Pharmacology & Therapeutics considers this method "attractive," since the antibody does not enter the brain; as a result, side effects on the central nervous system are minimal, if any. Additionally, the antibodies produced bind only to nicotine and not to nicotine metabolites or any similar endogenous structures such as acetylcholine.

However, while this drug may curtail addiction, it does not prevent psychological cravings; a user could potentially smoke heavily to compensate for the nullifying effects of NicVAX. However, a small study performed indicated that this did not happen among the test subjects.

== Studies ==
Initial tests, involving injections of nicotine-specific immunoglobulin G into laboratory rats in the early 2000s, resulted in nicotine levels in the brain cut by up to 65%.

=== Phase II trials ===
An early study in 2005 for 38 weeks by the University of Minnesota Cancer Center's Transdisciplinary Tobacco Use Research Center and published in Clinical Pharmacology & Therapeutics, involved 68 smokers, none of whom had known health problems or intended to quit smoking in the next month. Subjects were not instructed to quit smoking during the study. The test subjects were injected four times throughout the trial: when it began, and after four, eight and 26 weeks with either one of three dosages of NicVAX or a placebo. At the conclusion of the study, it was concluded that NicVAX was "safe and well tolerated", with side effects including headaches, colds, and upper respiratory tract infections. While most of the test subjects continued to smoke, six people from the high dosage group, one person from the medium dosage group, no one from the low dosage group, and two people from the placebo group quit smoking. They did not start again for at least thirty days.

In a further Phase IIb trial, a statistically significant number of patients with a high anti-nicotine antibody response met the primary endpoint of eight weeks of continuous abstinence between weeks 19–26. The top 30% of antibody responders (61 of the total 201 patients receiving drug) were examined in detail. A statistically significant number of these patients, (24.6%; p=0.04) showed continuous abstinence between weeks 19-26 compared to only 13.0% for the 100 patients receiving placebo. The quit rate of those patients who did not have a high antibody response was not statistically significant from placebo. The trial enrolled a total of 301 heavy smokers who smoked an average of 24 cigarettes per day prior to enrollment. Nabi issued a press release indicating that phase IIB testing was a success, showing statistically significant rates of smoking cessation and continuous long-term smoking abstinence during the trial period.

=== Phase III trials ===
Nabi Biopharmaceuticals conducted two Phase III trials of the drug. The first started in November 2009 and the second in March 2010. Nabi issued press releases announcing the start of these trials.

In July 2011 it was announced that the first of two planned phase III trials for NicVAX failed, sending the market capitalization of NABI Biopharmaceuticals to below the value of its cash holdings. In November 2011, NABI announced that NicVAX had failed the second phase III clinical trial, performing no better than a placebo.
