= Minhai COVID-19 vaccine =

Vaccine against COVID-19

Vaccine description
- Target: SARS-CoV-2
- Vaccine type: Inactivated

Clinical data
- Other names: KCONVAC (Chinese: 可维克; pinyin: Kěwéikè)
- Routes of administration: Intramuscular

Legal status
- Legal status: Full list of Minhai vaccine authorizations

Identifiers
- CAS Number: 2698355-03-0

Minhai COVID-19 vaccine (Chinese: 康泰民海新冠疫苗), trademarked as KCONVAC (Chinese: 可维克; pinyin: Kěwéikè), is a COVID-19 vaccine developed by Shenzhen Kangtai Biological Products Co. Ltd and its subsidiary, Beijing Minhai Biotechnology Co., Ltd.

== Clinical trials ==
In October 2020, KCONVAC started phase I clinical trials with 180 participants in China. Later, KCONVAC started phase II trials with 1,000 participants in China.

In May 2021, KCONVAC started phase III trials for global trials with 28,000 participants.

=== Children and adolescents trials ===
In August 2021, KCONVAC started phase I trials with 84 participants in China.

In September, KCONVAC started phase II trials with 480 participants in China.

== Authorizations ==
On 14 May 2021, the vaccine became the fourth inactivated Chinese Vaccine to be authorised for emergency use.
