= Caribbean Public Health Agency =

Regional public health agency headquartered in Trinidad and Tobago

Agency overview
- Formed: 2013; 13 years ago
- Preceding agencies: The Caribbean Environmental Health Institute (CEHI); The Caribbean Epidemiology Centre (CAREC); The Caribbean Food and Nutrition Institute (CFNI); The Caribbean Health Research Council (CHRC); The Caribbean Regional Drug Testing Laboratory (CRDTL)
- Jurisdiction: CARICOM
- Headquarters: Port of Spain, Trinidad and Tobago; 10°40′26″N 61°31′28″W
- Agency executive: Dr. Cheryl Joy St. John, Executive Director
- Website: http://www.carpha.org/

The Caribbean Public Health Agency (CARPHA) is a regional public health agency headquartered in Trinidad and Tobago which was established by CARICOM leaders in July 2011 and began operation in 2013.

CARPHA combines the functions of five pre-existing regional health institutions: The Caribbean Environmental Health Institute (CEHI), The Caribbean Epidemiology Centre (CAREC), The Caribbean Food and Nutrition Institute (CFNI), The Caribbean Health Research Centre (CHRC), and The Caribbean Research and Drug Treatment Laboratory (CRDTL).

== History ==
The CARPHA was established in 2013.

On 14 May 2014, the CARPHA acknowledged the gift by the Government of Canada of a Biosafety level 3 laboratory.

== Role ==
CARPHA aims to address regional issues including:

- Responding to disasters like hurricanes, earthquakes, and flooding.
- Monitoring and managing both communicable diseases (e.g. HIV/AIDS and COVID-19) and non communicable diseases (e.g. obesity and diabetes) that are prevalent in the region.
- Monitoring and preventing injuries, violence and illnesses in work places.
- Contributing to global health agreements and compliance with international health regulations.

=== COVID-19 ===
During the COVID-19 pandemic CARPHA has been performing tests for 18 countries in the region but warned on 5 April 2020, that they were running short on reagents required for COVID-19 testing and expected to be able to continue testing for three weeks.

On 9 April 2020, the European Union announced a grant of €8M (US$8.6M), which will be implemented by the Caribbean Public Health Agency, for the fight against the coronavirus.

On 11 April 2020, Prime Minister Mia Mottley of Barbados who is the CARICOM Chair, called a special Heads of Government meeting to deal with the COVID-19 pandemic, and establish a common public health protocol, and border policy. The governments have agreed to the proposal in a virtual meeting.

== Membership ==
CARPHA has 26 full members throughout the Americas.

Country	Joined	Population
Anguilla	-	15,753
Antigua and Barbuda	-	93,219
Aruba	-	106,537
(The Bahamas) Bahamas	-	407,906
Barbados	-	281,200
Belize	-	400,031
Bermuda	-	64,185
(Caribbean Netherlands) BES Islands (Bonaire, Sint Eustatius, Saba)	-	26,706
British Virgin Islands	-	31,122
Cayman Islands	-	68,136
Curaçao	-	190,338
Dominica	-	72,412
Grenada	-	124,610
Haiti	-	11,447,569
Guyana	-	804,567
Jamaica	-	2,827,695
Montserrat	-	4,417
Saint Kitts and Nevis	-	47,606
Saint Lucia	-	179,651
Sint Maarten	-	44,042
Saint Vincent and the Grenadines	-	104,332
Suriname	-	612,985
Trinidad and Tobago	-	1,525,663
Turks and Caicos Islands	-	45,114

== See also ==
- List of national public health agencies
- PAHO
- World Health Organization
