= Shenzhen Kangtai Biological Products =

Chinese biopharmaceutical company

Coordinates: 22.5467°N 113.9437°E

- Type: Public
- Traded as: SZSE: 300601
- ISIN: CNE100002Q33
- Founded: September 8, 1992; 34 years ago
- Founder: Du Weimin
- Headquarters: 6 Kefa Road, Science and Technology Park, Nanshan District, Shenzhen, Shenzhen, China
- Number of employees: 2043

Chinese name
- Simplified Chinese: 深圳康泰生物制品股份有限公司
Transcriptions
Standard Mandarin
- Hanyu Pinyin: Shēnzhèn Kāngtài Shēngwù Zhìpǐn Gǔfèn Yǒuxiàn Gōngsī
- Website: en.biokangtai.com

Shenzhen Kangtai Biological Products (Chinese: 深圳康泰生物制品股份有限公司, SZSE: 300601), also known as BioKangtai (Chinese: 康泰生物), is a Chinese biopharmaceutical company that develops, manufactures and markets vaccines and other vaccine products.

Kangtai develops the Minhai COVID-19 vaccine and has the exclusive right to manufacture the Oxford–AstraZeneca COVID-19 vaccine in mainland China.
