= Soberana 02 =

Vaccine against COVID-19

- A vial of Soberana 02

Vaccine description
- Target: SARS-CoV-2
- Vaccine type: Conjugate

Clinical data
- Trade names: Pasteur
- Other names: FINLAY-FR-2; Pasteurcovac, Pasto Covac, پاستوکووک
- Routes of administration: Intramuscular

Legal status
- Legal status: Full and emergency authorizations; Full list of Soberana 02 authorizations

Identifiers
- CAS Number: 2543416-58-4
- DrugBank: DB16524

Soberana 02 or Soberana 2, technical name FINLAY-FR-2, is a COVID-19 vaccine produced by the Finlay Institute, a Cuban epidemiological research institute. The vaccine is known as PastoCovac (Persian: پاستوکووک) in Iran, where it has been developed in collaboration with the Pasteur Institute of Iran.

It is a conjugate vaccine that requires two doses, the second one being administered 28 days after the first shot. A third (booster) dose of Soberana Plus may also be given on day 56. It has received emergency use authorization in Iran in June 2021, and in Cuba in August 2021, where it has also been approved for children above 2 years old.

The name of the vaccine, Soberana, is a Spanish word that means "sovereign". It followed a previous candidate vaccine called SOBERANA-01 (FINLAY-FR-1).

== Medical uses ==
The vaccine requires two doses, the second one being administered four weeks after the first shot. A third (boost) dose of Soberana Plus may also be given on eight weeks.

=== Efficacy ===
The interim results of a Phase III trial in Cuba has shown an efficacy of 71.1% after only two doses, increasing to 92.4% after adding a dose of Soberana Plus. The trial was undertaken while the delta variant was gradually taking over from beta in Havana.

The interim results of the Phase III trial in Iran show that the efficacy of a two-dose regimen is 51.31% against symptomatic disease, 78.35% against severe disease, and 76.78% against hospitalization. A third dose of Soberana Plus increases the efficacy against symptomatic disease to 70.58%, 83.52% against severe disease, and 91.76% against hospitalization. 89% of the cases in the Iranian trial were identified as having the delta strain.

The final results of the Phase III trials in Cuba show an efficacy against symptomatic disease of 71.0% against the beta and delta strains, while a third dose of Soberana Plus increased the efficacy up to 92.4%. Efficacy against severe disease and death is 100% for the heterologous three-dose regimen.

The final results of the Phase III trial in Iran show an efficacy of 67% against symptomatic disease and 96.5% against severe disease and hospitalization for a heterologous three-dose regimen. No deaths were observed in the trial group that received the three-dose regimen. Unlike the Phase III trials in Cuba, the majority of cases throughout the entire trial were of the delta strain (more than 90% at the time of vaccine evaluation).

A 2021 multicentre, randomised, double-blind, placebo-controlled, phase III trial of Soberana 02 showed acceptable vaccine efficacy against symptomatic COVID-19 and COVID-19–related severe infections. The trial was conducted in Iran and, for a 2-dose treatment, showed an efficacy of 49.7% against symptomatic disease, 76.8% against severe disease and 77.7% against hospitalisation. When a third dose of Soberana Plus was added to the treatment, the efficacy improved to 64.9% for prevention of symptomatic disease, 96.6% for prevention of severe disease, and 96.6% for prevention of hospitalisation.

== Pharmacology ==
FINLAY-FR-2 is a conjugate vaccine. It consists of the receptor binding domain of the SARS-CoV-2 spike protein conjugated chemically to tetanus toxoid.

Professor Ihosvany Castellanos Santos said that the antigen is safe because it contains parts instead of the whole live virus, and therefore it does not require extra refrigeration, like other candidates in the world.

== Manufacturing ==
The spike protein subunit is produced in Chinese hamster ovary cell culture. In the ACS Chemical Biology article, scientists from Cuba explain details of the vaccines technology and production.

Production

1. Cuba
2. Iran (under name of PasteurCoVac)

Potential Production

1. Ghana
2. Argentina

=== In Cuba ===
The Cuban government says it is planning to produce 100 million doses of its vaccine to respond to its own demand and that of other countries. Cuba has also suggested that, once it's approved, it will offer the vaccine to tourists visiting the country.

The production of the first batch of about 100,000 doses will start in April. José Moya, representative of the World Health Organization and the Pan American Health Organization (PAHO) in Cuba, suggested that after the vaccine passes all clinical stages, it could be included as part of PAHO's Revolving Fund.

The roll-out began with an "Interventional Trial" that consisted of inoculating 150,000 at-risk participants which seems to be defined as health-care workers. On April 11, 2021, the Ministry of Public Health of Cuba announced that 75,000 health-care workers were inoculated with their first dose of either of the two Cuba's Phase III vaccines (the other being Abdala).

By April 2022, Cuba inoculated 9.9 million of its 11.2 million residents, 6.4 million have received booster doses. The vaccine campaign using domestic products was heralded as a huge success by Cuban President Miguel Diaz-Canel when case loads were down significantly since January 2022. The Soberana vaccine preparations were particularly effective in children, preventing 70,000 pediatric cases before the Omicron wave hit.

=== Outside Cuba ===
Vietnam, Iran, Venezuela, Argentina, Pakistan, India, the African Union, Jamaica, and Suriname have expressed interest in purchasing the vaccine, following Phase 3 results.

Iran has signed an agreement to manufacture the vaccine and Argentina is negotiating one. Additionally, the Cuban government offered a "transfer of technology" to Ghana and will also supply "active materials" needed to make the vaccine.

While the price is currently unknown, the commercialization strategy of the vaccine will be a combination of the "impact on health" and the capability of Cuba's system to financially support "the production of vaccines and drugs for the country", per the director of the Finlay Institute, Vicente Vérez.

Up to 27 November 2021, 8 millions doses of Pasteurcovac have been produced in Iran.

== Clinical trials ==
SOBERANA vaccine family clinical trials
Registration			Group	Participants	Phase
Date	ID	Title	Group	Participants	Phase
2020-08-13	RPCEC00000332	SOBERANA 01	two low doses FINLAY-FR-1; two high doses FINLAY-FR-1; control (VA-MENGOC-BC®)	676	I/II
2020-10-17	RPCEC00000338	SOBERANA 01A	two high doses FINLAY-FR-1 + booster FINLAY-FR-1; two high doses FINLAY-FR-1 + booster FINLAY-FR-1A; two high doses FINLAY-FR-1A + booster FINLAY-FR-1A; two low doses FINLAY-FR-1A + booster FINLAY-FR-1A	60	I
2020-10-27	RPCEC00000340	SOBERANA 02	two low doses FINLAY-FR-2 + booster FINLAY-FR-2; two high doses FINLAY-FR-2 + booster FINLAY-FR-2; two low doses FINLAY-FR-2 + booster FINLAY-FR-1A; two high doses FINLAY-FR-2 + booster FINLAY-FR-1A	40	I
2020-12-17	RPCEC00000347	SOBERANA 02A	two doses FINLAY-FR-2 (batch 1) + booster FINLAY-FR-2; two doses FINLAY-FR-2 (batch 2) + booster FINLAY-FR-2; two doses FINLAY-FR-2 (batch 1) + booster FINLAY-FR-1A; two doses FINLAY-FR-2 (batch 2) + booster FINLAY-FR-1A	100	IIa
2020-12-17	RPCEC00000347	SOBERANA 02A	two doses batch 1 FINLAY-FR-2 + booster FINLAY-FR-1A; two doses batch 2 FINLAY-FR-2 + booster FINLAY-FR-1A; placebo	810	IIb
2021-01-05	RPCEC00000349	SOBERANA 01B	1-dose FINLAY-FR-1A	30	I
2021-03-03	RPCEC00000354	SOBERANA 02-FaseIII	two doses FINLAY-FR-2; two doses FINLAY-FR-2 + booster FINLAY-FR-1A; placebo	44,010	III
2021-03-19	RPCEC00000360	SOBERANA - INTERVENTION	two doses FINLAY-FR-2 + booster FINLAY-FR-1A	150,000	
2021-04-09	RPCEC00000366	SOBERANA PLUS	1-dose FINLAY-FR-1A	20	IIa
2021-04-09	RPCEC00000366	SOBERANA PLUS	1-dose FINLAY-FR-1A; placebo	430	IIb
2021-04-24	IRCT20210303050558N1	Phase III in Iran	two doses Soberana 02; two doses Soberana 02 + booster Soberana Plus; placebo	24,000	III
2021-06-10	RPCEC00000374	SOBERANA PEDIATRIA	two doses FINLAY-FR-2 + booster FINLAY-FR-1A	350	I/II

=== Phase I ===
FINLAY-FR-2, which started being developed in October 2020, had 40 volunteers for its Phase I, according to the Cuban Public Registry of Clinical Trials, with an open, sequential and adaptive study to assess safety, reactogenicity and explore immunogenicity of the vaccine.

=== Phase II ===
Phase IIa involved 100 Cubans, and phase IIb of the vaccine will have 900 volunteers between 19 and 80 years. Vicente Vérez, director general of the Finlay Vaccine Institute, said that the vaccine has shown to give an immune response after 14 days. The second phase has been supervised by Iranian officials from the Pasteur Institute.

=== Phase III ===
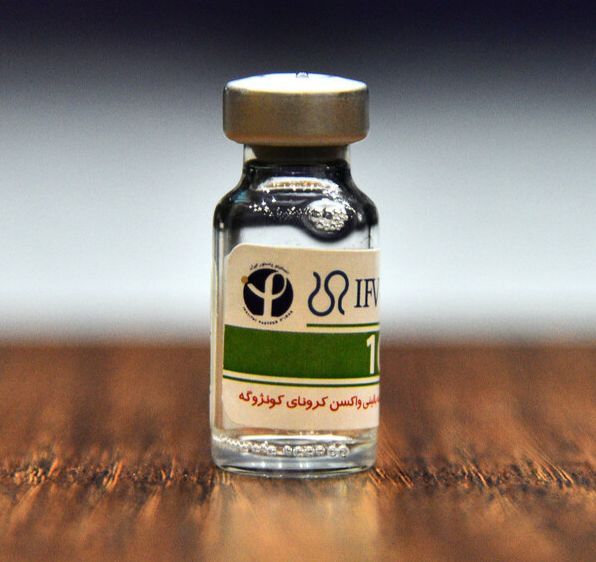
A vial of Soberana 02 vaccine in Iran for use in the phase III clinical trials

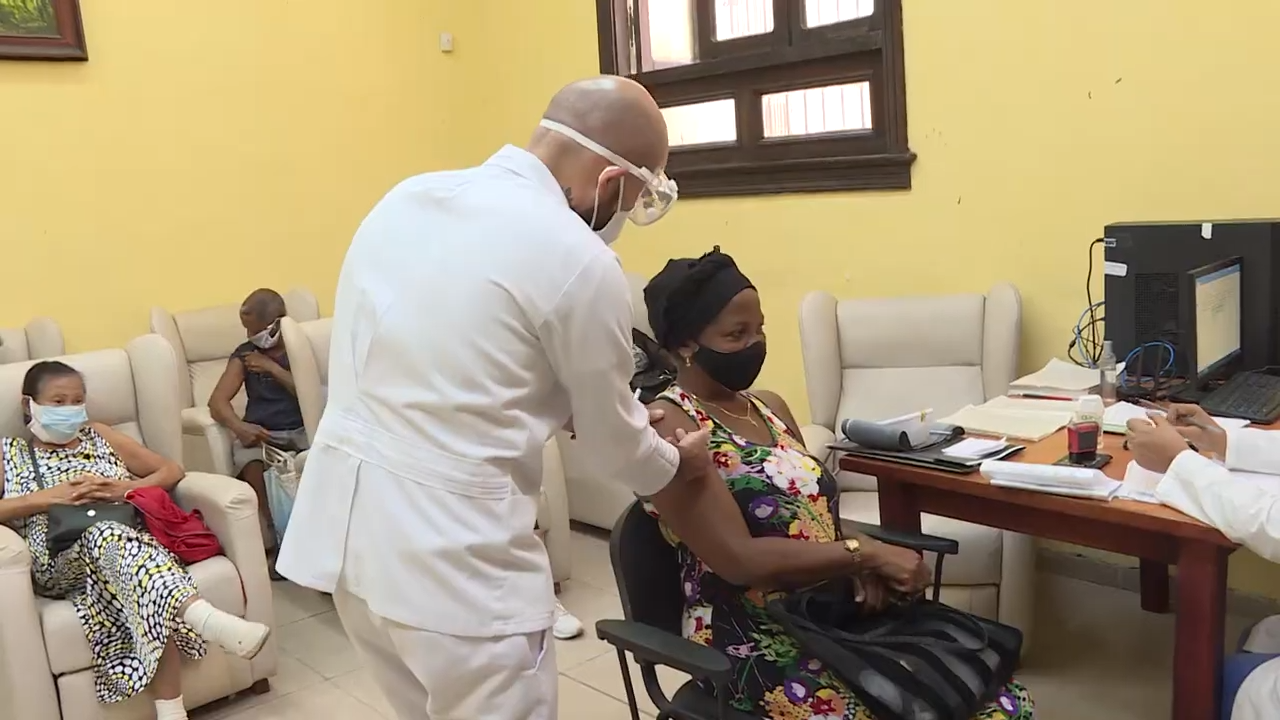
A woman getting vaccinated as part of phase III trials

Phase III commenced at the beginning of March as originally scheduled, and "ready to publish" results are expected by June. The trial volunteers are divided into three groups: some will receive two doses of the vaccine 28 days apart, another group will get two doses plus a third immune booster (Soberana Plus), and the third a placebo.

Although the trials involve thousands of adult volunteers recruited in Havana, Cuba's public health officials have said that they will also need to conduct phase III trials abroad because the island doesn't have an outbreak of sufficient scale to produce meaningful statistics on vaccine protection.

On March 13, 2021, the Cuban Biotechnology and Pharmaceutical Industries Business Group (BioCubaFarma) announced on social media that it had sent 100,000 doses of its Soberana 02 coronavirus vaccine candidate to the Pasteur Institute of Iran for clinical testing, "as part of the collaboration with other countries in the development of COVID-19 vaccines."

On April 26, 2021, it was reported that a Phase III conducted by the Pasteur Institute of Iran was approved to be started in Iran It was previously reported that the Institute will host Phase 3, but the pre-requisites were "technology transfer and joint production".

The Phase III trial in Iran has been conducted on 24,000 adults, aged between 18 and 80 years old in 8 cities. The interim results of the Phase III trial in Iran show that the efficacy of a two-dose regimen is 51.31% against symptomatic disease, 78.35% against severe disease, and 76.78% against hospitalization. A third dose of Soberana Plus increases the efficacy against symptomatic disease to 70.58%, 83.52% against severe disease, and 91.76% against hospitalization. The study was conducted when the delta variant was predominant in the country, with 89% of the cases in the Iranian trial identified as having the delta strain. Given the limited number of reported deaths in the trial, it was virtually impossible to analyze efficacy against death for both the two and three dose regimens.

Mexico plans to host a phase 3 trial.

The final results of the Phase III trials in Cuba show an efficacy against symptomatic disease of 71.0% against the beta and delta strains, while a third dose of Soberana Plus increased the efficacy up to 92.4%. Efficacy against severe disease and death is 100% for the heterologous three-dose regimen.

The final results of the Phase III trial in Iran show an efficacy of 67% against symptomatic disease and 96.5% against severe disease and hospitalization for a heterologous three-dose regimen. No deaths were observed in the trial group that received the three-dose regimen. Unlike the Phase III trials in Cuba, the majority of cases throughout the entire trial were of the delta strain (more than 90% at the time of vaccine evaluation).

=== Children and adolescents trials ===
In June 2021, Soberana started clinical trials for children and adolescents aged 3–18 from Phase I/II.

=== Interventional Study ===
The "Interventional Study" is set both in Havana, Cuba's capital and Santiago de Cuba, Cuba's second most populous city and in other provinces. On May 6, 2021, the Finlay Institute of Vaccines announced on social media that the following adverse events have been observed: injection site pain (20%), inflammation at the injection site (5%), and general discomfort (5%).

=== Authorizations ===
On June 29, 2021, Soberana 02 was authorized for emergency use in Iran.

On August 20, 2021, Soberana 02 was authorized for emergency use in Cuba. On September 3, 2021, the authorization has been expanded to children in the age 2–18 years old.

== See also ==
- COVID-19 vaccine clinical research
- COVID-19 pandemic in Cuba
- COVID-19 pandemic in Iran
- Healthcare in Cuba
- Pharmaceuticals in Iran
