= Center for Genetic Engineering and Biotechnology =

State-owned biotechnology institute in Cuba

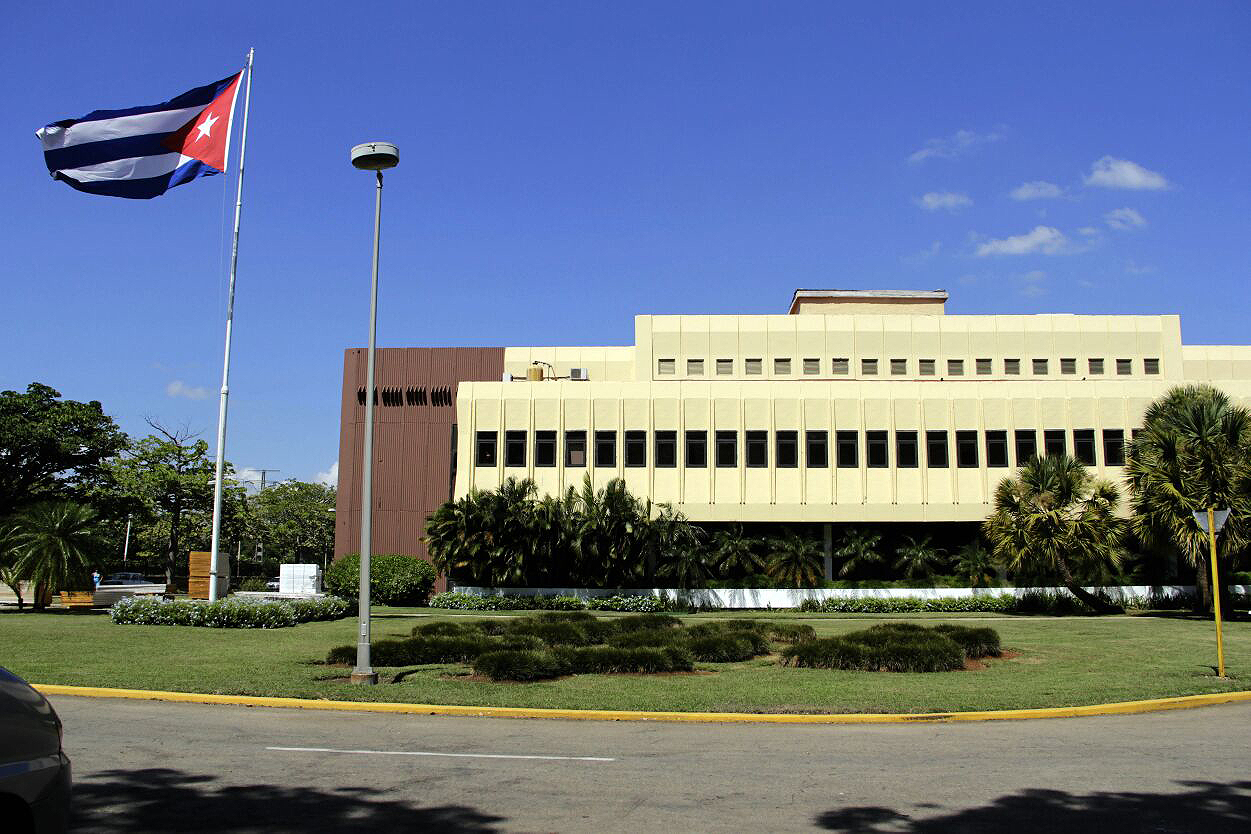
- Offices of the CIGB

Research institute overview
- Formed: July 1, 1985
- Jurisdiction: Cuba
- Headquarters: Avenida 31 No. 15802, Havana, Cuba; 23.0738°N 82.4523°W
- Website: www.cigb.edu.cu

The Center for Genetic Engineering and Biotechnology (Spanish: Centro de Ingeniería Genética y Biotecnología, CIGB) is a research institute in Havana, Cuba.

== Founding ==
In 1982, the United Nations Industrial Development Organization (UNIDO) offered grant funding via a competitive application process to facilitate biotechnology development in the Third World. Cuba sought, but did not receive funding, which instead was awarded to a joint project proposed by India and Italy. Cuba nonetheless proceeded with the development of a biotechnology research institution using its own funds, CIGB.

== Activity ==
In 2006, CIGB developed the Heberprot-P, which is used to treat foot ulcers. Its use results in rapid wound healing and a 75% decrease in amputations among diabetics with foot ulcers.

As of 2017, CIGB had 1,600 employees and sold 21 products internationally.

As of 2020, CIGB had two joint ventures with China.

It is responsible for creating the Abdala vaccine.

The Centre developed the COVID-19 vaccine Mambisa, which is in the final stages of clinical trials.

== See also ==
- BioCubaFarma
- Center of Molecular Immunology
