= Conjugate vaccine =

Type of vaccine

Pneumococcal conjugate vaccine immunization schedule

A conjugate vaccine is a type of subunit vaccine which combines a weak antigen with a strong antigen as a carrier so that the immune system has a stronger response to the weak antigen.

Vaccines are used to prevent diseases by invoking an immune response to an antigen, part of a bacterium or virus that the immune system recognizes. This is usually accomplished with an attenuated or dead version of a pathogenic bacterium or virus in the vaccine, so that the immune system can recognize the antigen later in life.

Most vaccines contain a single antigen that the body will recognize. However, the antigen of some pathogens does not elicit a strong response from the immune system, so a vaccination against this weak antigen would not protect the person later in life. In this case, a conjugate vaccine is used in order to invoke an immune system response against the weak antigen. In a conjugate vaccine, the weak antigen is covalently attached to a strong antigen, thereby eliciting a stronger immunological response to the weak antigen. Most commonly, the weak antigen is a polysaccharide that is attached to strong protein antigen. However, peptide/protein and protein/protein conjugates have also been developed.

== History ==
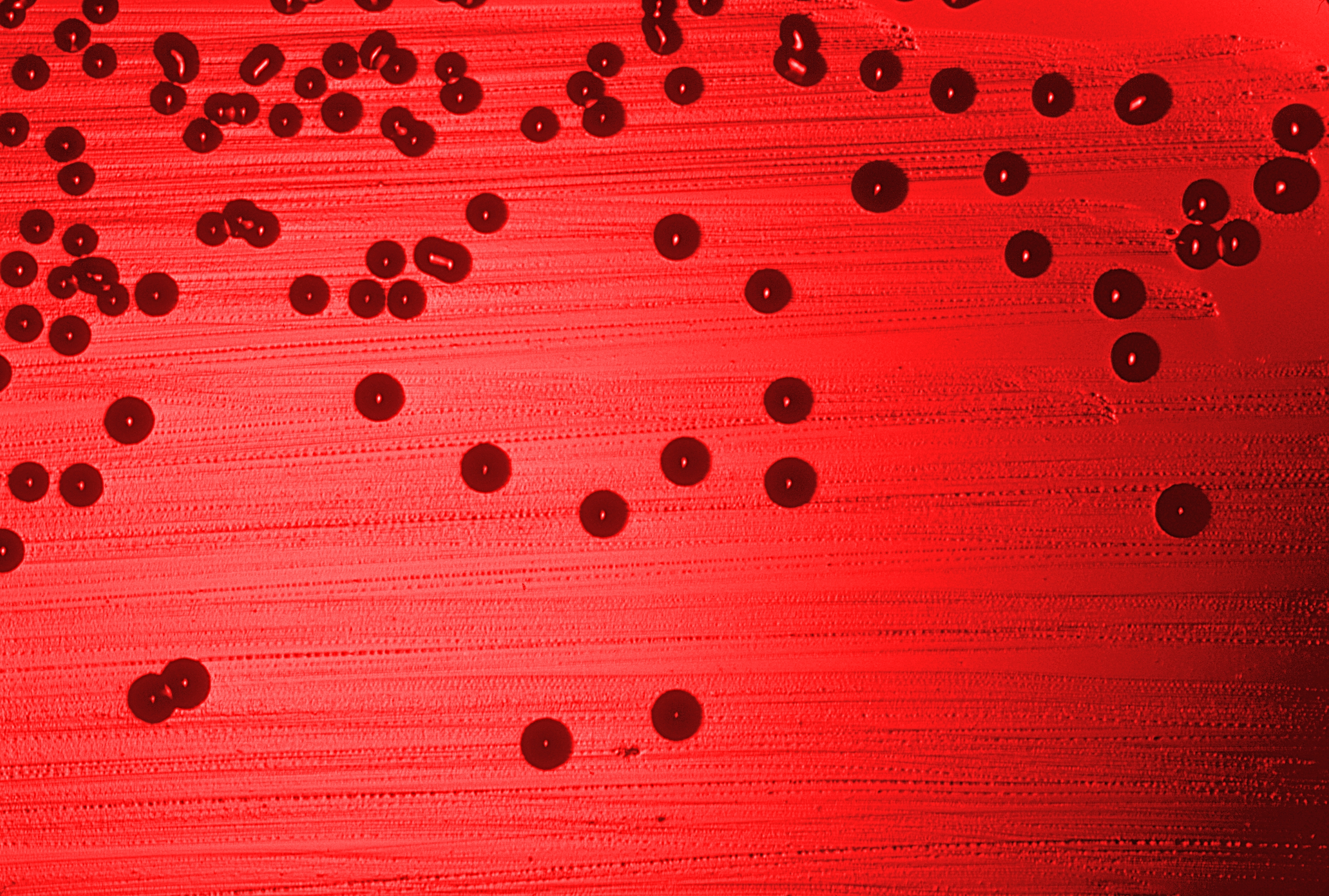
For bacteria with a polysaccharide coating, like Haemophilus influenzae type b, the best way to prevent infection is to use a conjugate vaccine.

The idea of a conjugate vaccine first appeared in experiments involving rabbits in 1927, when the immune response to the Streptococcus pneumoniae type 3 polysaccharide antigen was increased by combining the polysaccharide antigen with a protein carrier. The first conjugate vaccine used in humans became available in 1987. This was the Haemophilus influenzae type b (Hib) conjugate, which protects against meningitis. The vaccine was soon incorporated with the schedule for infant immunization in the United States. The Hib conjugate vaccine is combined with one of several different carrier proteins, such as the diphtheria toxoid or the tetanus toxoid. Soon after the vaccine was made available the rates of Hib infection dropped, with a decrease of 90.7% between 1987 and 1991. Infection rates diminished even more once the vaccine was made available for infants.

== Mechanism of action ==
Vaccines are supposed to produce an immune response that results in adaptive immune memory, the ability to quickly ramp up an appropriate response when an antigen is seen again. There are two types of adaptive immune memory, based on the antibody-producing memory B cells and TCR-producing memory T cells respectively. However, some antigens tend to go unnoticed when used on their own. One prominent group includes the polysacchides that make up the bacterial capsule, a structure that, among other functions, helps the bacteria evade being detected. The immune systems of young children are especially likely to ignore these polysaccharides, yet at the same time they are the most in need of an immune system that can stamp out the capsule-having bacteria before they spread too far. With no response, there would be no memory.

Even in adults, bacterial polysaccharides only produce a B cell response independent of T cell stimulation. The T cells cannot be activated by polysacchrides because polysaccharides by themselves cannot be loaded onto the major histocompatibility complex (MHC) of antigen presenting cells (APC) because MHC can only bind peptides. In contrast, proteins are much more effective at provoking the immune system, activating both types of cells. When the polysacchride is conjugated (chemically attached) to a protein, carrier peptide linked to the polysaccharide target antigen is able to be presented on the MHC molecule and the T cell can be activated. This improves the vaccine as T cells stimulate a more vigorous immune response and also promote a more rapid and long-lasting immunologic memory.

Conjugation can also lead the immune system to target small molecules that are not even recognized as an antigen in normal cases. A (somewhat controversial) application is the targeting of recreational substances so that a drug is intercepted by antibodies before it can enter the brain. Conjugation can also point the immune system towards "self" targets, such as in immunocontraception where an animal is made infertile by causing the immune system to intercept GnRH, a signal that activates the gonads, as an alternative to surgical neutering. The same idea is being used in cancer vaccines as a way to cause the immune system to target tumor antigens.

== Approved conjugate vaccines ==
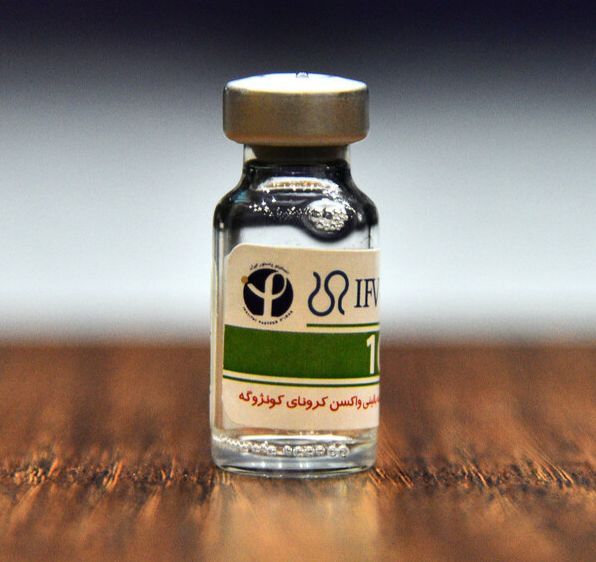
A vial of Soberana 02 vaccine in Iran for use in the phase III clinical trials

The most commonly used conjugate vaccine is the Hib conjugate vaccine. Other pathogens that are combined in a conjugate vaccine to increase an immune response are Streptococcus pneumoniae (see pneumococcal conjugate vaccine) and Neisseria meningitidis (see meningococcal vaccine), both of which are conjugated to protein carriers like those used in the Hib conjugate vaccine. Both Streptococcus pneumoniae and Neisseria meningitidis are similar to Hib in that infection can lead to meningitis.

In 2018, World Health Organization recommended the use of the typhoid conjugate vaccine which may be more effective and prevents typhoid fever in many children under the age of five years.

In 2021, Soberana 02, a conjugate COVID-19 vaccine developed in Cuba, was given emergency use authorisation in Cuba and Iran.

== Select list of other conjugate vaccines ==
- Various immunocontraception vaccines for animal use, including GonaCon (GnRH linked to keyhole limpet hemocyanin)
- NicVAX, which aims to vaccinate against nicotine using a chemically modified hapten version linked to exotoxin A
- TA-CD, cocaine linked to inactivated cholera toxin
- TA-NIC, nicotine linked to inactivated cholera toxin

== See also ==
- Toxoid
- Vaccine
- T cell
- B cell
- Immunogenicity
- Immune system
- Immune response
