= Finlay Institute =

Research institute in Cuba

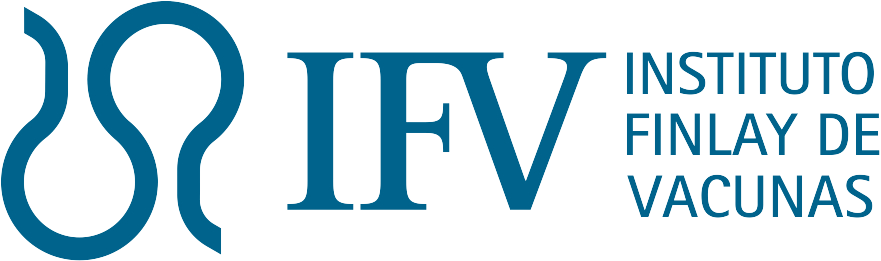
- Established: 1991
- Staff: 970 (2014)
- Address: Avenida 21 No. 19810
- Location: Havana, Cuba
- Coordinates: 23.0731°N 82.4576°W
- Interactive map of Finlay Institute
- Website: www.finlay.edu.cu

The Finlay Institute (Spanish: Instituto Finlay de Vacunas, lit. 'Finlay Vaccine Institute') is a Cuban organization that carries out medical research and mainly produces vaccines. It is named after the Cuban doctor Carlos Finlay, who was the first to hypothesize the involvement of a mosquito as a vector of yellow fever.

In response to fight against COVID-19, Finlay Institute has developed the Soberana 02. In March 2021, Vicente Vérez, director of the Finlay Institute, announced a delay in the development of vaccines and indicated the start of vaccination of the Cuban population in July 2021.
