= COVID-19 vaccination in Vietnam =

Plan to immunize against COVID-19 in Vietnam

- Number of administered second doses (by percentage of total population): 20-40% 41-60% 61-80% 81-90% 91-100%
- Date: March 8, 2021 – present
- Location: Vietnam
- Cause: COVID-19 pandemic in Vietnam
- Target: Immunization against COVID-19
- Budget: 25.2 trillion VND ($1.1 billion USD)
- Organised by: Vietnam's Ministry of Health
- Participants: 90,497,670 people with at least one dose administered of COVID-19 vaccine. 85,961,570 people have been fully vaccinated.
- Outcome: 90.7876 percent of the Vietnamese population has received at least one dose. 86.23695 percent of the Vietnamese population is fully vaccinated.

Number of people who received at least one dose of COVID-19 vaccine in Vietnam

Daily COVID-19 vaccine doses administered in Vietnam (Rolling 7-day average)

The COVID-19 vaccination in Vietnam is an ongoing immunization campaign against severe acute respiratory syndrome coronavirus 2 (SARS-CoV-2), in response to the ongoing pandemic in the country. Following the approval of the Oxford–AstraZeneca COVID-19 vaccine on 30 January 2021, vaccinations commenced on 8 March 2021, and will continue throughout the year with the goal of vaccinating 80% of the population by June 2022. The Sputnik V was later approved for use on 23 March 2021. The Sinopharm BIBP vaccine was approved for emergency use on 4 June 2021, while Pfizer–BioNTech COVID-19 vaccine, Moderna COVID-19 vaccine and Janssen COVID-19 vaccine were approved on 12 June 2021, 29 June 2021, and 15 July 2021, respectively. Vietnam approved Abdala vaccine from Center for Genetic Engineering and Biotechnology on 18 September 2021, and Covaxin from Bharat Biotech on 10 November 2021.

This is the country's largest-ever immunization campaign, aiming to administer over 150 million doses. As of 6 April 2022, Vietnam has administered 207,235,119 vaccine doses across the country.

== History ==
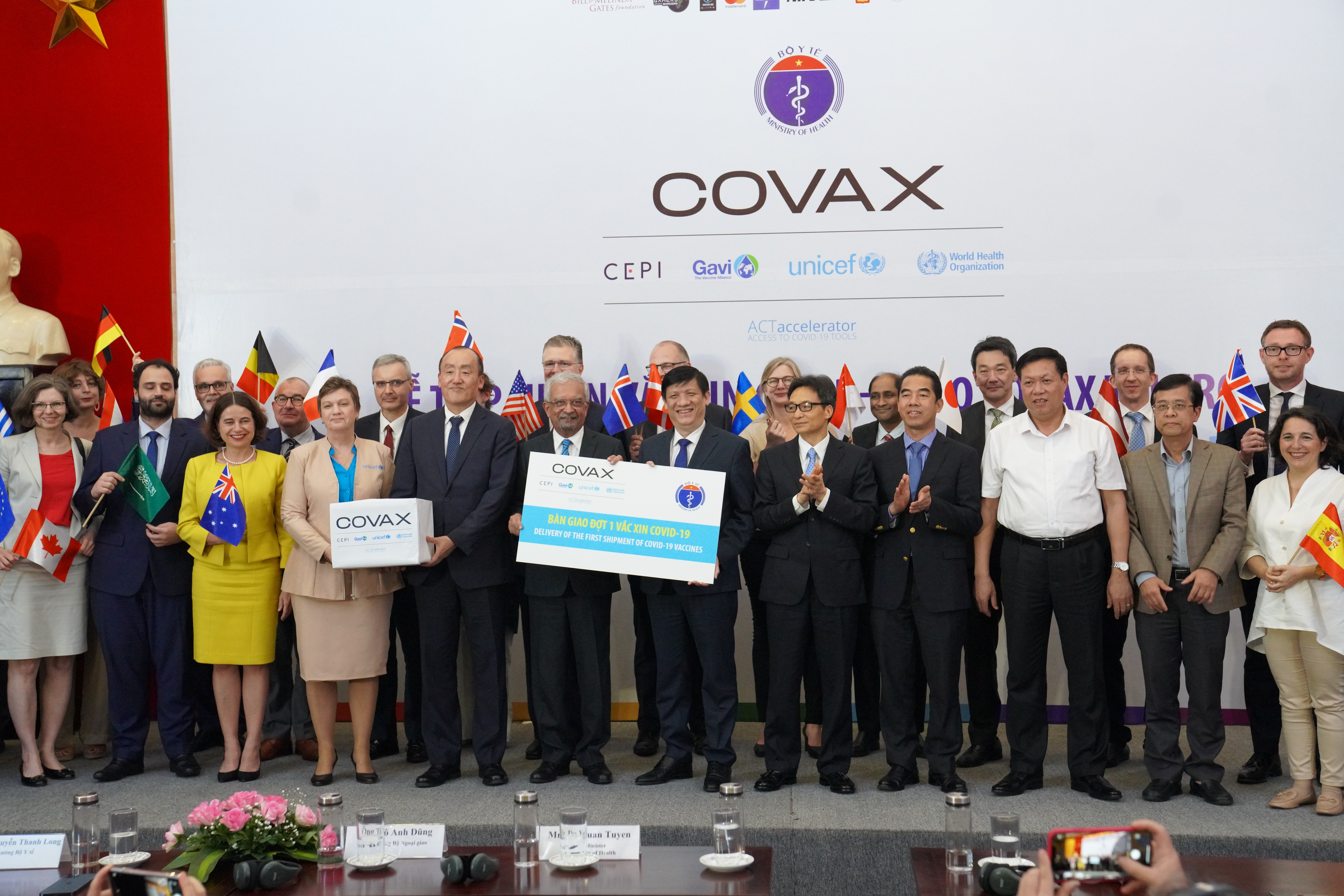
The handover ceremony of COVID-19 vaccine for Vietnam from COVAX Facility in 2021.

In August 2020, the Vietnamese government announced that they had signed up for 50 to 150 million doses of Sputnik V vaccine from Russia. The Russians will also donate a number of machines, biological products and equipment to Vietnam for COVID-19 prevention, including their vaccine. In the meantime, Vietnamese researchers will still continue developing the country's own vaccine. In early June, Minister of Health Nguyen Thanh Long confirmed that Russia had agreed to provide Vietnam with 20 million doses of Sputnik V in 2021. Vabiotech will also start packaging Sputnik V vaccine in Vietnam from July, with a monthly capacity of five million doses. On 21 July 2021, it was announced that a batch of Sputnik V had been produced for the first time in Vietnam by Vabiotech. Before that, on 12 July 2021, the Government allowed T&T Group to negotiate with the Direct Investment Fund of the Russian Federation (RDIF) for 40 million additional doses of Sputnik V vaccine, using its own fund; not from the government budget or Vietnam's vaccine fund. On August 4, 2021, Vimedimex signed an import contract with an UAE-based company called Royal Strategics Partners, for 10 million doses of COVID-19 Janssen vaccine; 5 million doses of COVID-19 vaccine Pfizer; 10 million doses of COVID-19 vaccine Sputnik V. Currently, the parties are completing legal documents to submit to the Ministry of Health for an import license.

In February 2021, the Ministry of Health suggested the government to approve COVID-19 vaccines from Gamaleya and Moderna for domestic inoculation to prevent and control the ongoing pandemic in the country. National Deployment and Vaccination plan (NDVP) was signed off by Deputy Minister of Health on 9 February 2021. Vietnam will receive the feedback of the plan from NDVP review committee as one of the required steps to receive COVID-19 vaccines through COVAX Facility – a global mechanism for developing, manufacturing, supplying and procuring COVID-19 vaccines for all country, especially for low and middle-income economies. Through COVAX, it is confirmed that Vietnam will receive 38.9 million doses of COVID vaccine in 2021. The first batch of vaccines sourced via Covax mechanism, containing 811,200 doses, arrived in Hanoi's Noi Bai International Airport on 1 April 2021. On 6 July, it was confirmed that the United States would send Vietnam two million doses of Moderna COVID-19 vaccine via Covax mechanism. 10 days later, on 16 July, the US embassy in Hanoi informed the Ministry of Health that the country will support Vietnam with 3 million additional doses of Moderna vaccine. On 25 July, the Ministry of Health said that Vietnam had received 3,000,060 doses of Moderna vaccine donated to COVAX by the US Government. 1,499,960 doses were delivered to Ho Chi Minh City on July 24 and 1,500,100 doses arrived in Hanoi on 25 July. On 25 August 2021, during a meeting in Hanoi, US Vice President Kamala Harris announced the donation of 1 million Pfizer-BioNTech vaccine doses to Vietnam, which would begin arriving within the next 24 hours. The United States sent Vietnam 1.5 million doses of Pfizer COVID-19 vaccine via Covax mechanism on 2 October 2021, 608,400 doses on 7 October and 397,800 doses on 8 October. On 24 and 25 October 2021, more than 2.6 million doses of Pfizer-BioNTech vaccine donated to COVAX by the US Government arrived in Vietnam.

AstraZeneca has also pledged to provide Vietnam with around 30 million doses via VNVC. Besides the deal with AstraZeneca, Vietnam is also stepping up negotiations with other manufacturers. In May 2021, Vietnam struck a deal to buy 31 million vaccine doses made by Pfizer and BioNTech by the end of the year, and also registered to purchase up to 10 million additional doses through COVAX under the cost-sharing scheme. On 14 July 2021, Pfizer committed to supplying Vietnam with 20 million doses of vaccine for children aged 12–18 years in the fourth quarter of 2021. In total, by the end of 2021, Pfizer will have provided 47 million doses of vaccine to Vietnam. Vietnam is also negotiating with India to buy 15 million doses of Covaxin.

In late June, Vietnam also received 500,000 doses of the Sinopharm BIBP vaccine, although the country had not ordered a single dose of this vaccine at that time. In July, The Ministry of Health also allowed a company in Ho Chi Minh City, Sapharco, to import 5 million doses of the Sinopharm BIBP vaccine. This is the second company in Vietnam allowed to import the COVID-19 vaccine, after VNVC. The Sinopharm BIBP vaccine will be administered to Chinese nationals in Vietnam, those wishing to go to, study or work in China and those living in border areas with China. On late July and early August 2021, Ho Chi Minh City received 2 million of the 5 million doses of the vero cell Sinopharm BIBP vaccine purchased by Sapharco. On 23 August, Ministry of Defence of Vietnam also received 200,000 doses of the Sinopharm BIBP vaccine donated by Ministry of National Defense of the People's Republic of China. 1 million doses of the Sinopharm - Hayat vaccine purchased by Vimedimex arrived at Noi Bai Airport on September 29, 2021.

In 2021, Japan has also donated 4.08 million doses of AstraZeneca vaccine to Vietnam, with the first batch arriving on June. On 14 July 2021, the Government of Romania announced the donation of 100,000 AstraZeneca vaccine doses to Vietnam, and considered sending more in the near future. On 19 July, Government of Romania decided to increase the number of vaccines sent to Vietnam to 300,000 doses. This donation arrived in Vietnam on 25 August 2021.

Australia also committed to provide 40 million AUD in aid and 5.2 million doses vaccine for Vietnam. 403,000 doses of the COVID-19 vaccine part of this commitment arrived on 26 August, while another 300,000 doses arrived on 6 October. On 26 July, the Czech Republic also announced the donation of 250,000 doses of vaccine to Vietnam, and 2 days later, the UK on July 28 also announced that the country would send 415,000 doses of vaccine to Vietnam. Vietnam received 415,000 doses of AstraZeneca vaccine from the UK on 3 August 2021. On August 11, the Hungarian Government decided to donate 100,000 doses of AstraZeneca vaccine to the Vietnam. On 12 August 2021, French President Emmanuel Macron announced the donation of 670,000 doses of vaccine to Vietnam through the COVAX mechanism. In late August 2021, the Polish government also decided to donate more than 501,000 doses of AstraZeneca vaccine to Vietnam, which arrived at Nội Bài International Airport on 21 August. On 25 August 2021, it was announced that the Italian government decided to donate 801,600 doses of AstraZeneca vaccine to Vietnam through the COVAX mechanism and China would donate an additional 2 million doses of vaccine to Vietnam. On 3 September, it was announced that the German Government had decided to donate about 2.5 million doses of AstraZeneca vaccine to Vietnam. 852,480 doses of AstraZeneca vaccine donated by Germany through the COVAX mechanism arrived in Vietnam on 16 September, while another batch of 2.6 million doses of AstraZeneca vaccine arrived on 26 September.

In September 2021, in total, Italy donated more than 2.8 million doses of AstraZeneca to Vietnam, making Vietnam one of the largest Italian vaccine priority partners globally. Belgium and Slovakia also donated 200,000 doses of AstraZeneca COVID-19 vaccine to Vietnam. Serbia also decided to send Vietnam 20,000 doses of COVID-19 vaccine. On 12 October 2021, South Korea also decided to donate 1.1 million doses of the AstraZeneca vaccine to Vietnam. On 14 October 2021, 560,000 doses of AstraZeneca vaccine and 12.5 tons of medical supplies from Hungary, Croatia and Slovakia arrived in Vietnam. On 15 October, the Ministry of Health received nearly 2 million doses of AstraZeneca vaccine, 890,000 doses from Poland; 1.1 million doses from South Korea and more than 2 million doses donated by Italy. On 29 October, the Prime Minister of Kuwait decided to donate 500,000 doses of COVID-19 vaccine to Vietnam.

Cuba also made pledges to supply Vietnam with 10 million doses of Abdala COVID-19 vaccine to Vietnam by the end of 2021. On 25 September, 1.05 million doses of Abdala vaccine and many medical equipment arrived in Vietnam after a visit of President Nguyen Xuan Phuc to Cuba.

In July 2021, the Ministry of Health allowed mixing first and second doses of the Oxford-AstraZeneca and Pfizer-BioNTech vaccines should there be limited vaccine supply and the vaccinated person agrees.

In late July 2021, Đồng Tháp Province allowed a local company to buy 200,000 doses of Nanocovax vaccine.

On 7 May 2021, Vietnam recorded first death after administered AstraZeneca vaccine. She was a 35-year-old medical staff in An Giang Province.

On 8 September 2021, Vietnam allowed those who received a first dose of Moderna's vaccine to get a different shot when they get their second dose due to the lack of vaccine supply.

On 14 October 2021, the Ministry of Health authorized the use of COVID-19 vaccine for children aged 12 to 17.

On December 10, the city of Ho Chi Minh initiated a campaign to administer third doses of AstraZeneca and Pfizer vaccinations to adults over 50, those with weakened immune systems, and frontline workers. The city plans to vaccinate all adults above the age of 18 with the third dosage in 2022.

=== Vaccines on order ===
As of 9 November 2023, a total of 230,910,514 doses have arrived in Vietnam. The government began to procure doses of COVID-19 vaccines from various sources:

Vaccine	Origin	Progress	Doses ordered	Doses available	Approval	Deployment	Notes
Oxford–AstraZeneca	United Kingdom, Sweden	phase III clinical trials	55 million	65,223,076 (Note: See Background and Progress to date for more information)	30 January 2021	8 March 2021	Including additional doses donated by COVAX, and other countries.
Sputnik V	Russia	phase III clinical trials	30 million	1,608,998	23 March 2021	March 2021	Including doses donated by Russia. Including 100,000 Sputnik Light doses. Produce in Vietnam by Vabiotech Pharmaceutical.
Sinopharm BIBP	China	phase III clinical trials	33 million	52,261,200 (Note: See #History and #Progress to date for more information)	4 June 2021	10 July 2021	Including additional doses donated by China.
Sinopharm BIBP	UAE	phase III clinical trials	30 million	52,261,200	10 September 2021	1 October 2021	Under the name Hayat-Vax.
Pfizer–BioNTech	Germany, United States	phase III clinical trials	51 million	92,590,080 (Note: See #History and #Progress to date for more information)	12 June 2021	17 July 2021	The first batch was delivered in July 2021. Including additional doses donated by the United States through COVAX.
Moderna	United States	phase III clinical trials	5 million	14,077,160	29 June 2021	17 July 2021	Including additional doses donated by COVAX.
Janssen	Belgium, Netherlands, United States	phase III clinical trials	10 million	None	15 July 2021	Pending	
Abdala	Cuba	phase III clinical trials	10 million	5,150,000	18 September 2021	October 2021	
Covaxin	India	phase III clinical trials	Unknown	None	10 November 2021	Pending	
Nanocovax	Vietnam	phase III clinical trials	200,000		Pending	Pending	
ARCT-154	United States, Vietnam	phase I-III clinical trials					
Covivac	Vietnam	phase II clinical trials	Unknown				
Vabiotech	Vietnam	phase I clinical trials	Unknown				

- Even when the Chinese announced it would provide priority access to CoronaVac and the Sinopharm BIBP vaccine, Vietnam is the last ASEAN nation to publicly state if it will use this due to anti-China sentiment among the public. It is also one of the last to approve a Chinese vaccine.
- For locally produced COVID-19 vaccines, the MOH expects to have the first batch ready for use at the end of the third quarter of 2021. These vaccines can be put into the country's vaccination campaign in 2022 to ensure supply source and health security, overcome the difficulties when purchasing foreign vaccines. The two locally produced vaccines, Nanocovax and COVIVAC, were put on trial on January to March 2021, respectively. On 21 July 2021, the first test batch of Russia's Sputnik V vaccine has been produced in Vietnam, according to Russia's sovereign wealth fund RDIF and Vietnamese pharmaceutical company Vabiotech. The first validation samples taken from the batch were shipped to Gamaleya Center in Russia for quality control checks. On 24 September, the vaccine began to be mass-produced when it was determined that it met the quality standards.

=== Local production ===
Vaccine	Production Capacity	Manufacturer	Notes
Nanocovax	8–12 million doses a month	Nanogen Pharmaceutical Biotechnology JSC	Able to increase capacity to 30–50 million doses a month
Covivac	6–30 million doses a year	Institute of Vaccines and Medical Biologicals	
Sputnik V	5 million doses a month	Vaccine and Biological Production Company No. 1 (Vabiotech)	
ARCT-154	200 million doses a year	Vinbiocare	

=== Vaccines in trial stage ===
COVID‑19 candidate vaccines
Vaccine candidates, developers, and sponsors	Type (technology)	Current phase (participants) design	Completed phase (participants)	Ref
VBC-COV19-154 COVID-19 vaccine Arcturus Therapeutics, Vinbiocare	mRNA	Phase III (21,000); Phase I/II/III (21,000): Randomized, double-blinded, placebo controlled. Aug–Dec 2021, Vietnam	Preclinical	
Nanocovax; Nanogen Pharmaceutical Biotechnology JSC	Subunit (SARS‑CoV‑2 recombinant spike protein with aluminum adjuvant)	Phase III (13,000); Jun–Sep 2021, Vietnam	Phase I–II (620); Phase I (60): Open label, dose escalation. Phase II (560): Randomization, double-blind, multicenter, placebo-controlled. Dec 2020 – Jun 2021, Vietnam	
Covivac; Institute of Vaccines and Medical Biologicals	Viral vector	Postponed	Phase I–II (495); Phase I (120): Open label, dose escalation. Phase II (375): Randomized, observer-blind. Mar 2021 – Dec 2021, Vietnam	
Vabiotech COVID-19 vaccine Vaccine and Biological Production Company No. 1 (Vabiotech)	Subunit	Preclinical; Awaited for the conduct on Phase I trial	?	

- A spokesman from the Covivac vaccine development team stated on November 30, 2021, that they are currently unable to locate a location with several thousand people who have not been inoculated against COVID-19 and are eligible to participate in clinical trials. As a result, the development team opted to halt the phase three experiment indefinitely.

== Rollout plan ==
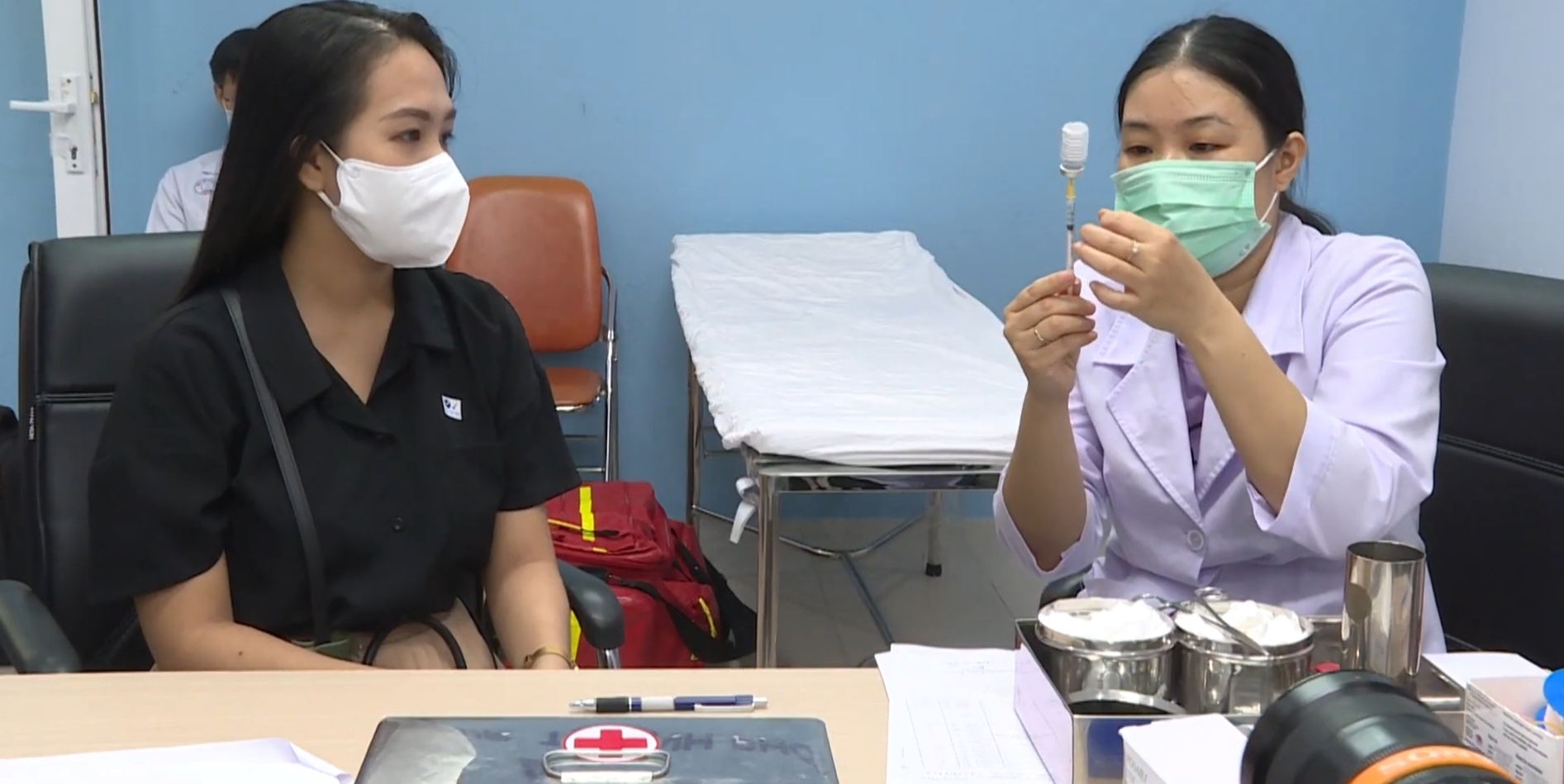
A medical staff prepares to inject the AstraZeneca COVID-19 vaccine for journalist at the Ho Chi Minh City Pasteur Institute.

VNVC – the company in charge of importing and storing vaccines in Vietnam, announced that it is ready to deploy staff and facilities that can store up to 170 million doses of vaccines. The facilities include 49 provincial vaccine warehouses, 2 cold-condition warehouses, and 3 deep-freeze warehouses designed for storing vaccines at temperatures ranging from -40 to -86°C. In February 2021, VNVC's service capacity was reported to reach up to 100,000 customers per day, with the capability to scale up to accommodate the distribution of up to 4 million doses of COVID-19 vaccines per month.

According to Deputy Minister of Health Tran Van Thuan, for the majority of the population to be protected, Vietnam needs to diversify its vaccine supply. This diversification includes using locally manufactured vaccines and the maximizing resources from businesses and local government budgets, in addition to the national government's budget, to support the vaccination program. The budget for vaccinating 20% of the population is estimated at 6.739 trillion VND ($293.67 million USD), with more than 90% of this cost covered by the COVAX Facility. The Vietnamese government will contribute 24 billion VND, complemented by municipal and provincial governments and private sources.

On 24 June 2021, the Ministry of Health established a Steering Committee for the nationwide COVID-19 vaccination campaign. The committee consists of five subcommittees:

- Subcommittee on Receiving, Transporting, and Preserving Vaccines
- Subcommittee on Immunization
- Subcommittee on Safety of Vaccination
- Subcommittee on Quality Supervision of Vaccines
- Subcommittee on Information Technology Application in Vaccination Management and Communication

along with a permanent office for the Steering Committee. The National Steering Committee for the COVID-19 vaccination campaign is headed by the Minister of Health. The command center of the vaccination campaign is located at the Ministry of Defence, led by a Deputy Chief of the General Staff of the People's Army. It is expected that the campaign will utilize eight vaccine storage warehouses, with one warehouse in each military district and another at the High Command of Capital Hanoi. Upon arrival at the airport, vaccines will be immediately transferred to the military warehouse, from where they will be transported by military vehicles to 19,000 vaccination points nationwide.

== Progress to date ==
1. AstraZeneca (28.8%)
2. Sinopharm (23.6%)
3. Pfizer and Moderna (44.6%)
4. Abdala (2.32%)
5. Sputnik V and Sputnik Light (0.73%)
1. Government procurement (47.9%)
2. COVAX (25.6%)
3. Foreign government aid (14.3%)
4. Private enterprise (12.1%)

In mid-March 2021, Vietnam received 2,000 doses of Sputnik V vaccine donated by the Government of the Russian Federation and used it for nearly 900 people. On 1 August 2021, Vietnam received another 10,000 doses of Sputnik V vaccine donated by the Government of the Russian Federation. 740,000 doses of Sputnik V vaccine, provided by the Russian Direct Investment Fund, arrived at Noi Bai airport, Hanoi, on the afternoon of September 29.

The first batch of vaccines sourced via COVAX mechanism, containing 811,200 doses, arrived in Hanoi's Noi Bai International Airport on 1 April 2021. Vietnam received the second shipment of vaccines sourced via Covax, containing nearly 1,682,400 AstraZeneca COVID-19 vaccine doses on 16 May. On 2 August 2021, COVAX delivered additional batch containing 1.18 million doses of AstraZeneca COVID-19 vaccine shipped from Laboratorio Univesal Farma, manufacturing facility in Spain, to Vietnam. On 10 August 2021, Viet Nam received 494,400 doses of COVID-19 vaccine AstraZeneca from the COVAX Facility.

117,600 doses of AstraZeneca's COVID-19 vaccine via VNVC contract arrived at Tan Son Nhat international airport in Ho Chi Minh City on 24 February. Another batch of AstraZeneca COVID-19 vaccines containing 288,100 doses arrived at Tan Son Nhat Airport on 25 May. This is the second batch under a contract for 30 million the Ministry of Health and the VNVC have struck with the company. The third batch containing 580,000 AstraZeneca COVID-19 vaccines under the VNVC contract arrived at Tan Son Nhat airport, on the morning of 9 July, while another batch with 921,400 doses arrived on 15 July. On 23 July, 1,228,500 doses of AstraZeneca vaccine arrived at Tan Son Nhat International Airport, the largest shipment so far under the contract between Vietnam Vaccine Joint Stock Company (VNVC) and AstraZeneca. On 29 July, another 659,900 doses of AstraZeneca COVID-19 vaccine arrived at Tan Son Nhat airport. On 6, 13 and 19 August 2021, 592,100, 1,113,400 and 1,209,400 doses of AstraZeneca COVID-19 vaccine under VNVC contract arrived at Tan Son Nhat airport. Another batch containing 1,442,300 doses of COVID-19 vaccine AstraZeneca, under VNVC contract, arrived at Ho Chi Minh City on 26 August. From 30 August to 1 September, Vietnam received 2,016,460 doses of COVID-19 vaccine AstraZeneca under VNVC contract.

On 16 June 2021, Vietnam also received 966,320 doses of AstraZeneca COVID-19 vaccine donated by Japan. On 25 June, it is announced that Japan will donate another 1 million doses of AstraZeneca vaccine to Vietnam. The first batch of this donation (400,000 doses) arrived at Tân Sơn Nhất International Airport on 2 July, while the second batch arrived on 9 July. On 16 July, Japan sent another 996,740 doses of AstraZeneca vaccine to Vietnam. On 3 August 2021, Vietnam received 415,000 doses of AstraZeneca vaccine donated by the UK Government. On late August, Vietnam also received 501,600 doses and 300,000 doses of AstraZeneca vaccine donated by Poland and Romania. On 26 August 2021, Vietnam received 404,000 doses of COVID-19 vaccine part of Australia's commitment to provide 1.5 million doses of AstraZeneca vaccine for Vietnam through UNICEF.

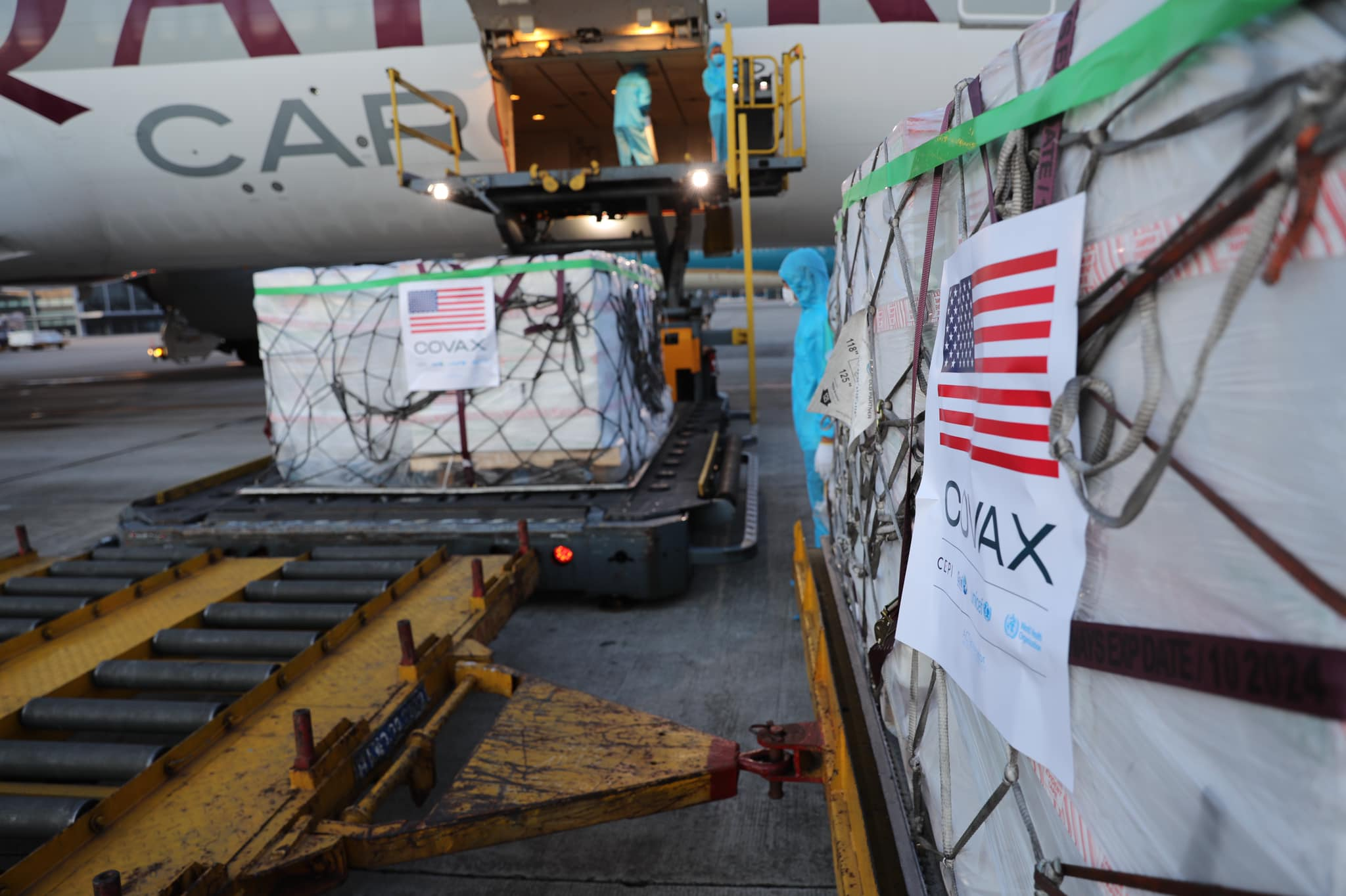
On July 10, Vietnam received 2,000,040 doses of Moderna COVID-19 vaccine donated to the COVAX Facility by the United States Government.

On 7 July 2021, the first batch of Pfizer's vaccines, containing 97,110 doses, arrived at Nội Bài International Airport. It was later confirmed that Vietnam received 746,460 doses of Pfizer's vaccines that day. A day earlier, on 6 July, it is also confirmed that the United States would send Vietnam two million doses of Moderna COVID-19 vaccine via Covax mechanism. This batch of vaccines arrived in Vietnam on 10 July. Another batch containing 3,000,060 doses of Moderna vaccine donated to COVAX by the US Government arrived in Hanoi on 24 and 25 July. On 11 August 2021 and 26 August 2021, Vietnam received 217,620 and 770,000 doses of Pfizer's vaccines purchased by the government. On 25–27 August 2021, Vietnam received 1,065,870 doses of Pfizer vaccine donated by the US government. Vietnam received 250,800 doses of AstraZeneca and Moderna COVID-19 vaccine donated by the Czech Republic on 30 August.

Vietnam's COVID-19 vaccination programme began on 8 March 2021, administering the AstraZeneca vaccine to medical workers in Hanoi, Ho Chi Minh City and Hải Dương province. As of 12 March 2022, a total of 200,179,247 administered vaccination doses have been reported.

In Ho Chi Minh City, many people have injected the first dose or have completed the second dose for more than a month but have not been updated by the authorities to the vaccination confirmation app. The rigid way of some vaccination points is to rely only on the vaccination certificate on the app caused many people to miss the opportunity to get the second dose on time.

=== By locality ===
Locality (Note: Excluding Ministry of Public Security and Ministry of Defense)	Population	Doses distributed	Doses administered	Doses administered per 100 people
Bắc Giang province	1,803,950	3,706,530	4,026,604	223.21
Bắc Kạn province	313,905	580,140	556,216	177.19
Cao Bằng province	530,341	993,120	923,137	174.06
Hà Giang province	854,679	1,722,760	1,439,333	168.41
Lạng Sơn province	781,655	1,741,530	1,541,562	197.22
Phú Thọ province	1,463,726	2,463,940	2,852,797	194.9
Quảng Ninh province	1,320,324	3,275,758	3,064,841	232.13
Thái Nguyên province	1,286,751	2,412,650	2,370,688	184.24
Tuyên Quang province	784,811	1,425,200	1,384,593	176.42
Lào Cai province	730,420	1,514,820	1,426,269	195.27
Yên Bái province	821,030	1,632,480	1,626,425	198.1
Điện Biên province	598,856	1,145,460	1,044,733	174.45
Hòa Bình province	854,131	1,646,630	1,586,085	185.7
Lai Châu province	460,196	782,870	788,203	171.28
Sơn La province	1,248,415	1,828,320	1,859,143	148.92
Bắc Ninh province	1,368,840	3,072,490	3,169,873	231.57
Hà Nam province	852,800	1,839,760	1,802,645	211.38
Hải Dương province	1,892,254	3,284,650	3,394,616	179.4
Hưng Yên province	1,252,731	2,458,262	2,393,761	191.08
Nam Định province	1,780,393	3,200,140	3,058,872	171.81
Ninh Bình province	982,487	1,747,960	2,031,105	206.73
Thái Bình province	1,860,447	3,150,960	3,235,036	173.88
Vĩnh Phúc province	1,151,154	2,292,030	2,378,445	206.61
Hà Nội	8,053,663	17,732,612	17,601,648	218.55
Hải Phòng	2,028,514	4,454,300	4,540,095	223.81
Hà Tĩnh province	1,288,866	2,270,650	2,121,051	164.57
Nghệ An province	3,327,791	5,498,900	6,241,110	187.55
Quảng Bình province	895,430	1,520,330	1,407,007	157.13
Quảng Trị province	632,375	1,306,372	1,201,431	189.99
Thanh Hóa province	3,640,128	7,685,680	6,058,145	166.43
Thừa Thiên-Huế province	1,128,620	2,428,436	2,246,567	199.05
Đắk Lắk province	1,869,322	3,400,550	3,405,571	182.18
Đắk Nông province	622,168	1,287,080	1,236,828	198.79
Gia Lai province	1,513,847	2,734,912	2,607,763	172.26
Kon Tum province	540,438	1,020,100	923,997	170.97
Lâm Đồng province	1,296,906	2,968,224	2,942,855	226.91
Bình Định province	1,486,918	2,949,670	2,940,648	197.77
Bình Thuận province	1,230,808	2,720,780	2,453,808	199.37
Khánh Hòa province	1,231,107	2,755,850	2,943,641	239.11
Ninh Thuận province	590,467	1,233,610	1,221,287	206.83
Phú Yên province	872,964	1,732,454	1,687,865	193.35
Quảng Nam province	1,495,812	3,204,860	2,926,361	195.64
Quảng Ngãi province	1,231,697	2,755,364	2,237,145	181.63
Đà Nẵng	1,134,310	2,495,582	2,631,204	231.97
Bà Rịa-Vũng Tàu province	1,148,313	2,756,640	2,665,872	232.16
Bình Dương province	2,426,561	6,222,150	5,792,367	238.71
Bình Phước province	994,679	2,212,180	2,029,846	204.07
Đồng Nai province	3,097,107	6,663,800	6,278,791	202.73
Tây Ninh province	1,169,165	2,581,560	2,568,673	219.7
Ho Chi Minh City	8,993,082	20,321,778	20,162,558	224.2
An Giang province	1,908,352	4,054,292	3,961,149	207.57
Bạc Liêu province	907,236	1,609,230	1,661,733	183.16
Bến Tre province	1,288,463	2,994,032	2,904,036	225.39
Cà Mau province	1,194,476	2,457,310	2,382,037	199.42
Đồng Tháp province	1,599,504	3,617,852	3,346,514	209.22
Hậu Giang province	733,017	1,529,630	1,509,954	205.99
Kiên Giang province	1,723,067	3,601,150	3,030,096	175.85
Long An province	1,688,547	4,333,358	4,382,424	259.54
Sóc Trăng province	1,199,653	2,581,060	2,703,917	225.39
Tiền Giang province	1,764,185	3,725,890	3,788,828	214.76
Trà Vinh province	1,009,168	2,098,550	2,031,051	201.26
Vĩnh Long province	1,022,791	2,337,120	2,314,156	226.26
Cần Thơ	1,235,171	2,765,418	2,681,102	217.06

== Adverse event following immunization ==
Of the 69 medical staff at Gia Lai Field Hospital who administered AstraZeneca vaccine on 9 March 2021, eight had mild side effects and one female nurse had severe side effects. Five minutes after injection, this nurse (with a history of bronchial asthma) experienced symptoms of perioral numbness, vomiting, dizziness, chest tightness and difficulty breathing. As of 17 March 2021, in 20,000 people were injected, 4,078 cases had common reactions like muscle pain, headaches, diarrhoea, fever or hives, five with anaphylaxis grade II and one grade III case, all of these case are in stable conditions. The health ministry has asked local health authorities which face serious post-injection reactions to set up a professional council to evaluate the causes. There has not been a single case of severe blood clots reported in some European nations.

On 7 May 2021, Vietnam recorded the first death of a person vaccinated with the AstraZeneca vaccine. She was a 35-year-old medical staff in An Giang Province. This female health worker was vaccinated with AstraZeneca vaccine in the morning of 6 May at the vaccination site in Tan Chau Regional General Hospital. Before the injection, she was screened and explained about post-injection reactions. After the injection, she had anaphylactic shock reaction. According to the conclusion of the An Giang Department of Health, the cause of death is anaphylaxis on the basis of non-steroidal allergy (anti-inflammatory painkiller).

On 21 June 2021, Vietnam recorded the second death of a person vaccinated with the AstraZeneca vaccine. He was a 26-year-old teacher in Hanoi. He was vaccinated at the medical center in Dong Anh District on 20 June, after having health checkup and being given eligibility for vaccination. He died at 23:15 on 21 June, 39 hours after getting vaccinated against COVID-19. The cause of death is not known. 100 people besides this man who got vaccinated at that center that day were all stable.

As of 5 September 2021, there were 825,305 mild adverse event following immunizations (AEFIs) (3.7%) and 51 serious AEFIs (7 fatal).

On 5 November 2021, Hanoi Department of Health gave information about the incident of injecting Pfizer vaccine for 18 children aged 2 to 6 months in Quoc Oai district. After injection, some children have fever, redness, swelling at the injection site and not recorded any cases of anaphylaxis.

On 23 November 2021, there were at least 72 workers, aged 25–30 at a shoe company showing side effects after injecting Vero Cell COVID-19 vaccine, in which 5 people had anaphylactic shock. By 25 November, four workers had died. Thanh Hoa authorities stopped injecting the remaining 43,000 doses of Vero Cell in storage and investigated the cause of this incident.

== Public opinion and vaccine effectiveness ==
A poll conducted from October to December 2020 found that Vietnam had one of the highest vaccine acceptance rate in the world. 98% of people surveyed responded they would definitely or probably get vaccinated when a COVID-19 vaccine becomes available.

A survey conducted in mid-October 2021 at the Hospital for Tropical Diseases in Ho Chi Minh City (where severe COVID-19 patients are treated) showed that 45% of the 349 patients had mild symptoms, while the rest had severe symptoms.

When comparing mild and severe symptoms in vaccinated and unvaccinated patients, 74% of the unvaccinated group had severe symptoms. 40% of those in the vaccinated group (who received one or two doses) had severe symptoms. 49% of those who received one dose experienced severe symptoms, while only 12% of those who received the second dose did. There was one case that required invasive mechanical ventilation and five cases that required an oxygen mask in the group that received the second doses. In the group that received only one injection, invasive mechanical ventilation was required in ten cases. In the unvaccinated group, there were 51 cases that required mechanical ventilation and three cases that required ECMO.
