= COVID-19 pandemic in Thailand =

- Disease: COVID-19
- Pathogen: SARS-CoV-2
- Location: Thailand
- First outbreak: Wuhan, Hubei, China
- Index case: Suvarnabhumi Airport
- Arrival date: 8 January 2020 (confirmed 12 January) (6 years, 9 months and 4 weeks)
- Confirmed cases: 5,624,839
- Recovered: 4,719,635 (updated 23 July 2023)
- Deaths: 35,030
- Vaccinations: 57,005,496 (total vaccinated); 53,486,090 (fully vaccinated); 142,635,000 (doses administered)

Government website
- ddc.moph.go.th/viralpneumonia/eng

The COVID-19 pandemic in Thailand is a part of the worldwide pandemic of COVID-19 caused by severe acute respiratory syndrome coronavirus 2 (SARS-CoV-2). Thailand was the first country to report a case outside China, on 13 January 2020. As of 2 April 2022, the country has reported a cumulative total of 3,684,755 confirmed cases, with 25,318 deaths from the disease, and currently ranked fourth in the number of cases in Southeast Asia, behind Vietnam, Indonesia, and Malaysia.

Thailand was relatively successful in containing the pandemic throughout most of 2020, but has been experiencing an uncontrolled resurgent outbreak since April 2021. An initial wave of infections, mostly traced to nightlife venues and a boxing match in Bangkok, peaked on 22 March 2020 at 188 newly confirmed cases per day. As preventive measures were implemented, the outbreak subsided by May, and the country reported almost no locally transmitted infections until December, when it saw a surge of infections primarily clustered around large migrant worker communities in Samut Sakhon province. The new outbreak spread to many provinces, with a maximum daily of 959 cases reported on 26 January 2021, before partially subsiding in February. In April, however, a new wave of infections originated from Bangkok's Thong Lo–area nightlife venues and rapidly spread in Bangkok as well as throughout the country. It was identified to be of the highly transmissible Alpha variant first reported from the United Kingdom, and by 14 April, over a thousand cases per day were being identified, causing a shortage of hospital beds as government policy required admission of all confirmed cases.

The Thai government's response to the outbreak was initially based on surveillance and contact tracing, though it was late to implement clear quarantine measures. In response to the first outbreak, Prime Minister Prayut Chan-o-cha declared a state of emergency, effective on 26 March, and the Centre for COVID-19 Situation Administration (CCSA) (Note: Also titled in full as the "Centre for the Administration of the Situation due to the Outbreak of the Communicable Disease Coronavirus 2019 (COVID-19)".) was established to coordinate the government's response, working in conjunction with the Department of Disease Control and issuing public communications through its spokesperson Taweesin Visanuyothin. Lockdown measures were implemented in varying degrees throughout the country, with public venues and businesses ordered to close. A curfew went into effect on 3 April, and all commercial international flights were suspended from 4 April. The public has cooperated relatively well with health advisories, and the country's robust public health infrastructure has been credited as a contributing factor to its relatively successful initial response. Easing of restrictions was gradually implemented from mid-May. The curfew was lifted in July and academia reopened in August. However, the state of emergency remained in effect.

With the subsequent outbreaks in December 2020 and April 2021, the government appeared reluctant to implement the same degree of restrictive measures for fear of further disruptions to the economy. In December, it focused instead on mass testing of migrant workers and travel restrictions from affected provinces, while in April, it allowed the Songkran (Thai New Year) holidays to go ahead (though without water-splashing celebrations), despite having cancelled the holidays in 2020 when the caseload was lower. Vaccinations began at the end of February 2021, mostly limited to healthcare workers and mainly using the CoronaVac vaccine imported from China's Sinovac Biotech. The majority of the country's vaccine supply is planned to rely heavily on the Oxford–AstraZeneca vaccine through a manufacturing deal secured by palace-owned Siam Bioscience company, with first batches expected in June 2021.

The pandemic has heavily disrupted the country's economy, of which tourism is a significant sector. The International Monetary Fund has predicted Thailand's GDP to shrink by 6.7 percent in 2020, a revision from a previous estimated 2.5% increase. The government has borrowed and announced several assistance measures, including cash handouts to those affected and a 1.9 trillion-baht (US$60 billion) stimulus package, though few people have actually received it. Dissatisfaction to its economic impact and government response contributed to the second wave of 2020–2021 Thai protests starting from 18 July 2020.

On 23 September 2022 General Prawit Wongsuwan, Deputy Prime Minister acting Prime Minister chair of CCSA was reported that General Supot Malaniyom Secretary-General of the National Security Council (NSC), had reported a better overview of the pandemic, new infected and the death toll decreased and the Ministry of Public Health has adjusted the COVID-19 from dangerous communicable diseases to surveillance infectious disease; therefore resolved to cancel the declared a state of emergency and collapse the Centre for COVID-19 Situation Administration (CCSA) with effect from 30 September 2022 onwards and will use the Communicable Diseases Act B.E. 2558, which was already approved by the Cabinet in 2021, to control the COVID-19 situation instead.

== Background ==
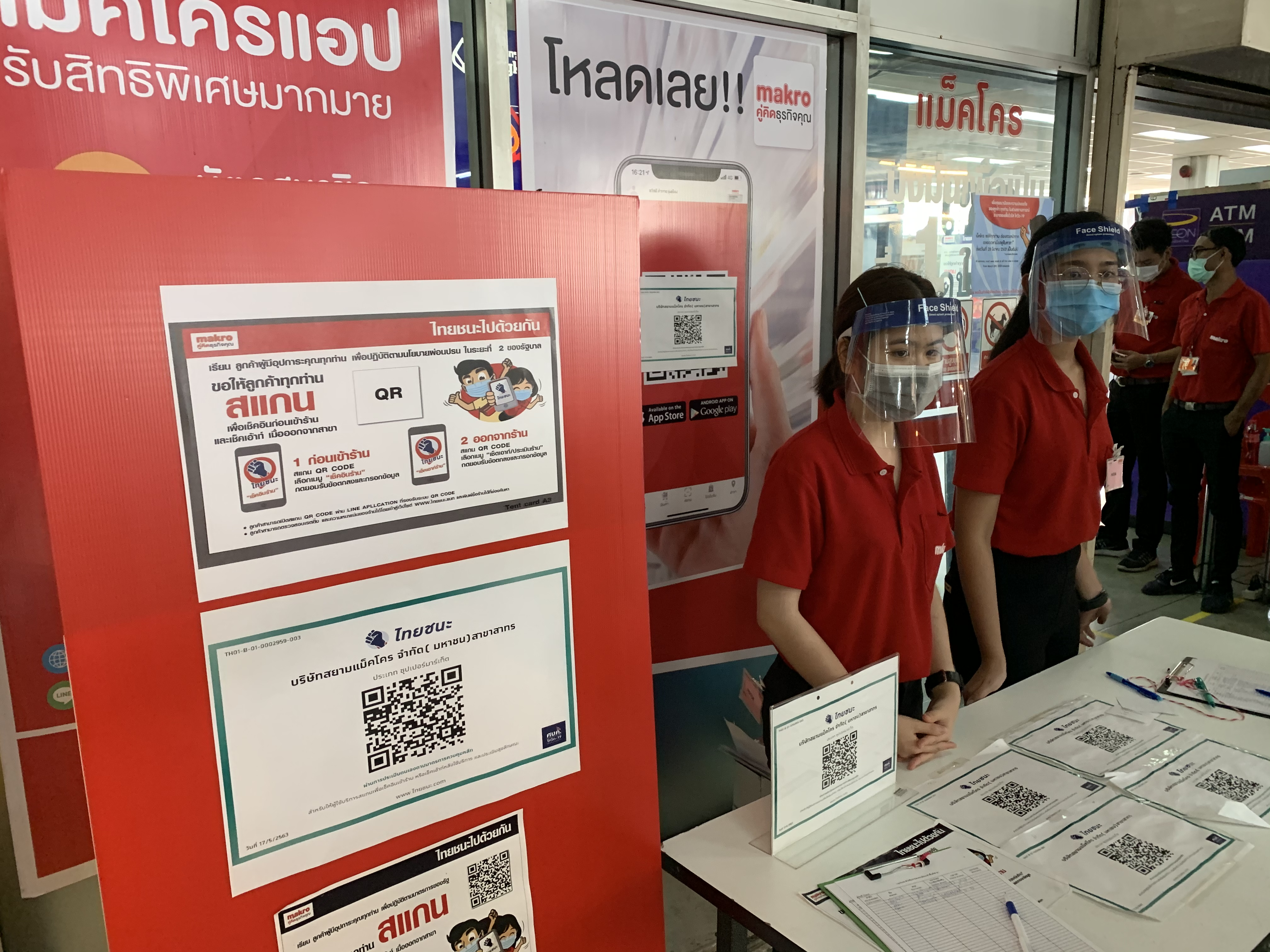
A preventive measure introduced in May; Thai Chana QR-code before entering a retail premise to track individual customers

On 12 January, the World Health Organization (WHO) confirmed that a novel coronavirus was the cause of a respiratory illness in a cluster of people in Wuhan, Hubei, China, who had initially come to the attention of the WHO on 31 December 2019.

Unlike SARS of 2003, the case fatality ratio for COVID-19 has been much lower, but the transmission has been significantly greater, with a significant total death toll.

However, the spread of the new and significantly impacting delta variant of COVID-19, the infection and death rate of COVID-19 has dramatically increased to a current new high of over 20,000 cases per day and over 160 deaths

== Timeline ==
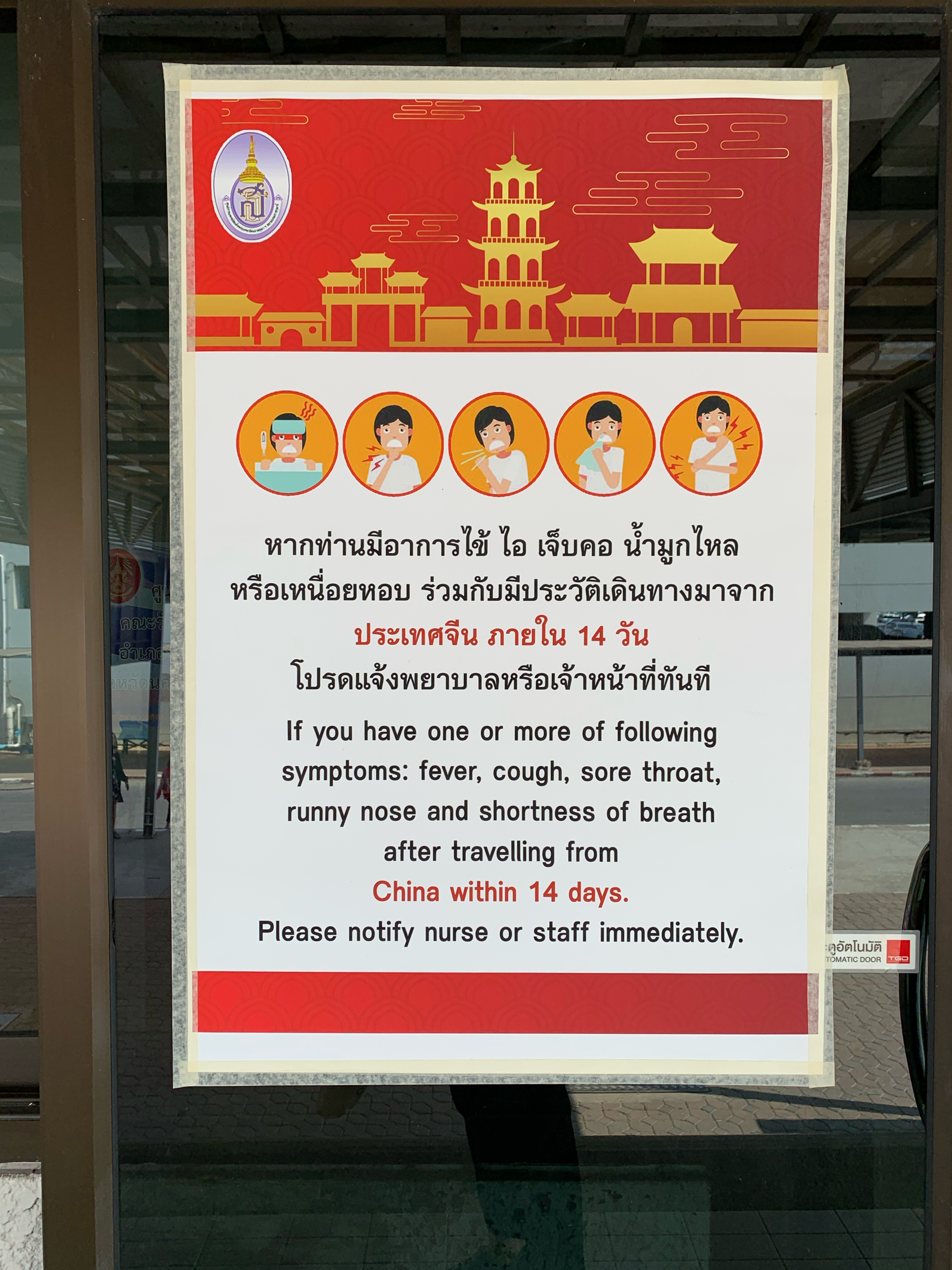
One of the earliest announcements on the disease in Thailand, concerning only those who had been travelling from China

On 13 January 2020, the Ministry of Public Health announced the first confirmed case, a 61-year-old Chinese woman who is a resident of Wuhan. She arrived at Suvarnabhumi Airport in Samut Prakan on 8 January, where she was detected using thermal surveillance and then hospitalised. Thailand's second case occurred in a 74-year-old Chinese woman who arrived in Bangkok on a flight from Wuhan on 13 January 2020. Several more cases were detected in arrivals from China throughout January.

On 31 January 2020, an additional five cases were reported, bringing the cumulative number of confirmed cases to 19. One was a local taxi driver who had no records of travelling to China and was thus suspected to have been infected by a Chinese tourist he picked up, making this the first case of human-to-human virus transmission within the country. The other cases were Chinese nationals. The number of cases remained low throughout February, totaling to 40 confirmed by the end of the month.

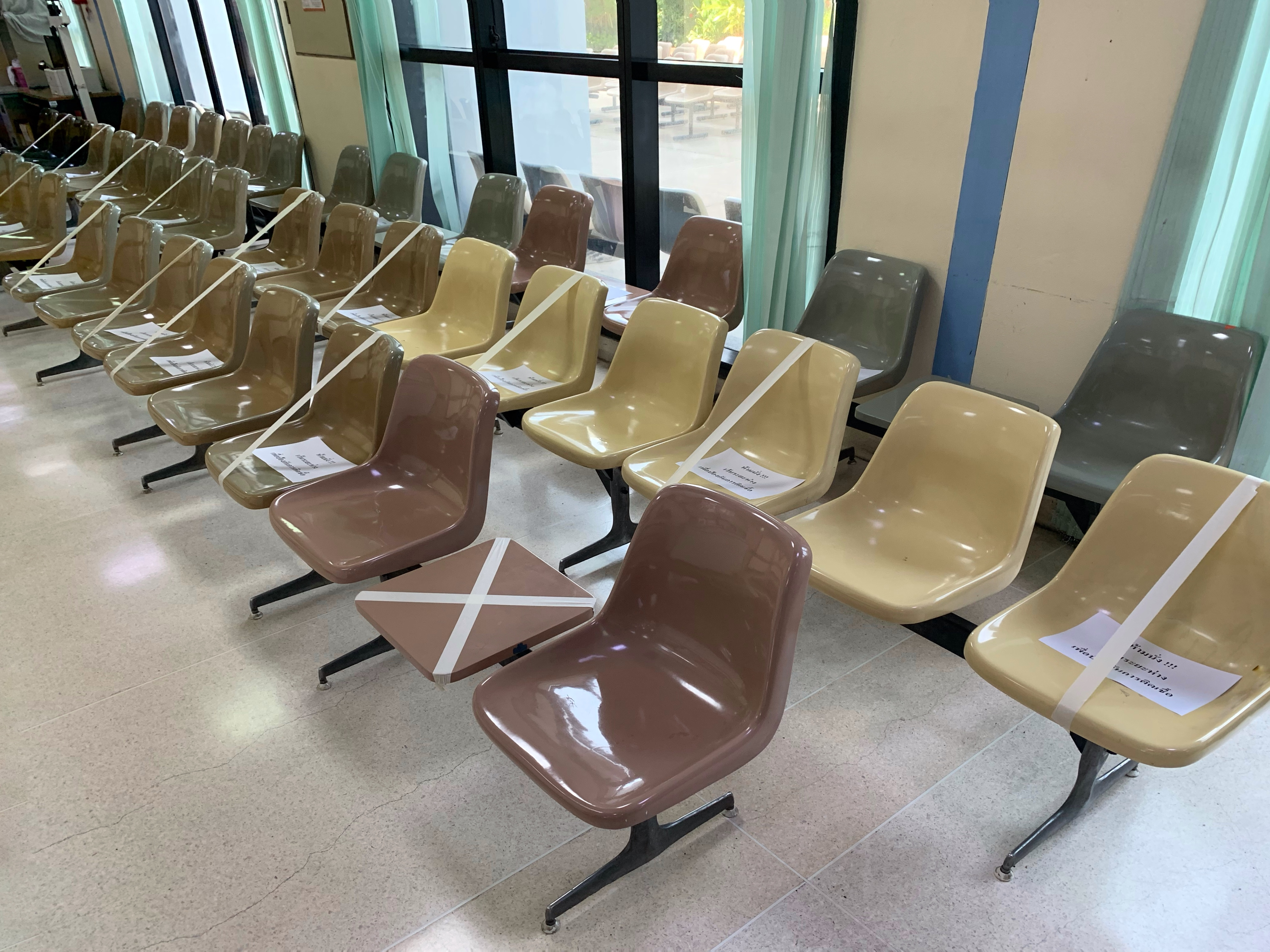
A social distancing practice by marking seats at King Chulalongkorn Memorial Hospital, Bangkok

On 1 March 2020, MOPH reported the first confirmed death in Thailand. The number of cases surged around mid-March, with 89 new cases reported on 21 March, the largest single-day rise since the virus reached the country. The outbreak was traced to several transmission clusters, the largest of which occurred at a Muay Thai fight at the military-run Lumpinee Boxing Stadium on 6 March. Confirmed cases rose to over a hundred per day over the following week, and public venues and businesses were ordered to close in Bangkok and several other provinces. The abrupt closure of Bangkok businesses prompted tens of thousands of workers to travel to their hometowns. Prime Minister Prayut Chan-o-cha declared a state of emergency, effective on 26 March, and a curfew went into effect on 3 April. All commercial international flights were suspended from 4 April, and lockdown measures were implemented in varying degrees throughout the country.

The rate of new cases gradually dropped throughout April 2020, and by mid-May, locally transmitted infection rates had fallen to near-zero, and easing of restrictions was gradually implemented. The curfew was lifted in July 2020 and academia began reopening in August.

On 15 July 2020, the national centre for COVID-19 has announced two new infected cases; an Egyptian soldier in Rayong Province, and a Sudanese diplomat's daughter in Asok neighbourhood of Bangkok. Both of them were the government's exceptions for "VIP guests," not requiring to comply with several COVID-19 measures. Many criticised the government's failure to contain the disease from those VIPs.

Even though there had been no new domestic cases since mid-May, on 21 August 2020, the CCSA announced that it decided to extend the Emergency Degree until 30 September, claiming that it was necessary to use its power to prevent incoming aliens from overseas in many routes, and that Thai people' daily lives were not affected, since CCSI had already loosen its restriction on activities such as academia reopen. International rights groups have criticized the emergency decree being employed to suppress free speech.

In September 2020, a prison inmate who had not been abroad was Thailand's first locally transmitted case in 100 days. Another domestic case was detected on 7 November, though neither cases were not traced to any further outbreaks.

In October, foreign tourists entered Thailand for the first time in seven months under the Special Tourist Visa program. A total of 1,201 visitors arrived in the month, compared to 3.07 million in the same month a year earlier. A French tourist on Ko Samui in Surat Thani contracted the disease after passing the 14-day state quarantine. She developed a fever 17 days after arriving in the country. In November, the government extended the coronavirus emergency decree for the eighth time, approving a 45-day extension until 15 January 2021.

Starting at the end of November 2020, at least ten cases were detected in women who had illegally crossed the Myanmar border into Mae Sai District from Tachileik. They made long-distance travels, including by bus and by air, and some attended large gatherings, prompting authorities to impose quarantine on people who may have come into close contact with them.

In mid-December, an outbreak occurred in Samut Sakhon, just southwest of Bangkok, increasing the country's total confirmed cases by at least 20%. Cases in the province, which is the center of the country's fishing industry, primarily impacted migrant workers from Myanmar, a major source of labour in the seafood industry. Over 1,300 cases were traced to a seafood market in Samut Sakhon, as cases were detected in 27 provinces. Before the surge, Thailand had recorded about 4,300 COVID-19 cases and just 60 deaths, while Myanmar had registered about 117,000 cases. The 576 cases reported on 20 December was Thailand's biggest daily increase and caused the nation's overall total to climb 13%. A new cluster emerged in Rayong, linked to a gambling den. On 28 December, a worker at the den died, Thailand's first COVID-19 death in nearly two months. With the clusters starting to spread into Bangkok, the Bangkok Metropolitan Administration announced that the city would close schools and daycare centres 4–17 January 2021. Soon after, the Ministry of Education ordered all schools closed for the month of January.

A third, more serious wave occurred in April 2021 following the emergence of clusters in entertainment districts in and around Bangkok early in the month. Thought to be exacerbated by the presence of the highly-transmittable B.1.1.7 variant in Thailand, the wave led to the largest surge in cases in the country to date, with sharp increases in daily cases over the course of the month. On 14 April, Thailand detected 1,335 new cases, the first time the country reported a four-figure case count; by 24 April, the number of new cases peaked at 2,839.

Thailand required anyone testing positive for the virus to be hospitalized, even those who were asymptomatic. This led to a shortage of hospital beds. Field hospitals were established in several cities. By May, almost 30,000 patients were in the country's hospitals and field hospitals.

== Government response ==
=== International travel restrictions ===
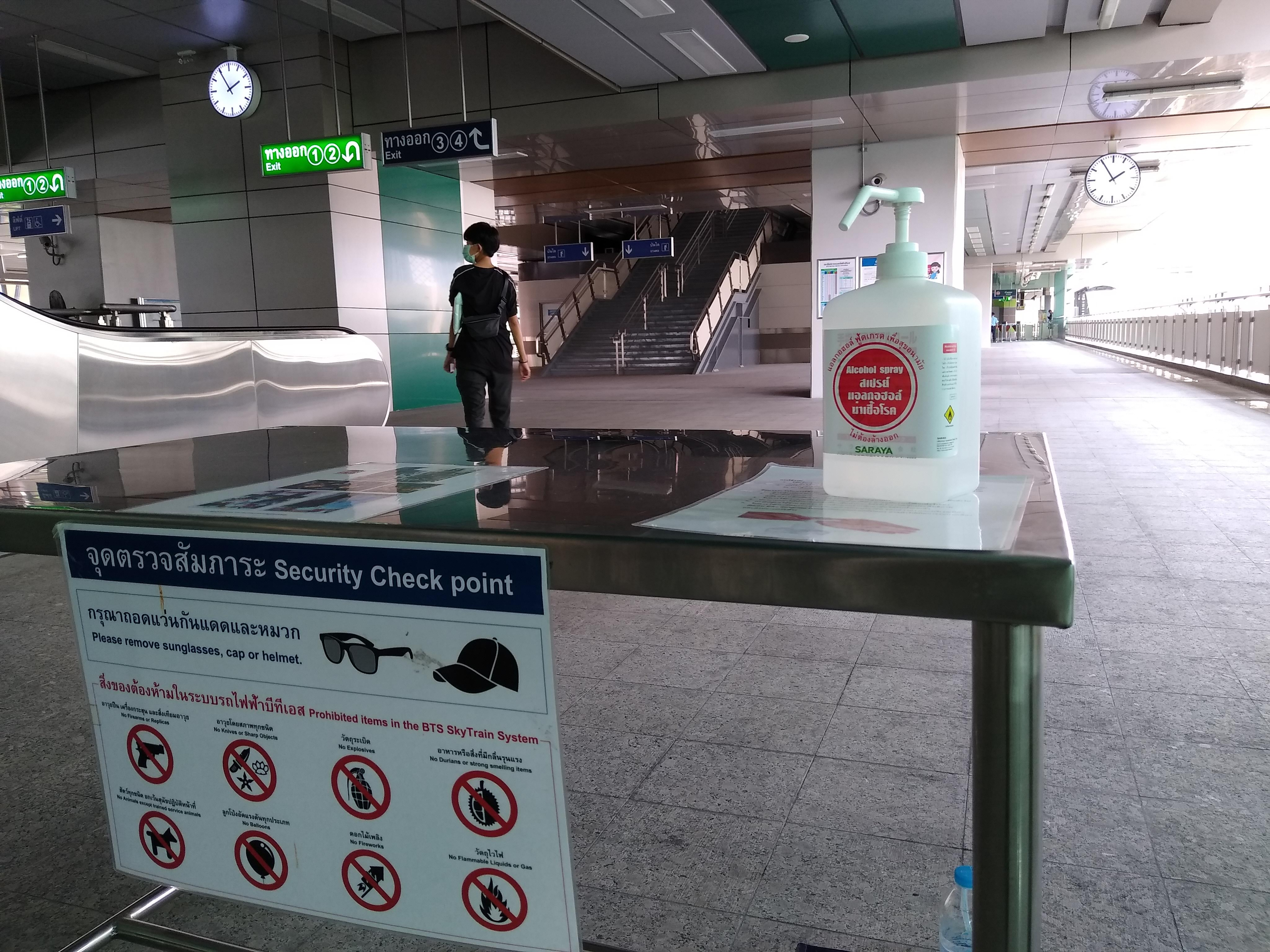
Hand sanitizer at a BTS Skytrain station in Bangkok for commuters to protect themselves against COVID-19

The screening of passengers arriving from China is ongoing at six airports, beginning on 3 January: Suvarnabhumi Airport, Don Mueang International Airport, Phuket International Airport, Chiang Mai International Airport and Krabi International Airport, with the addition of Chiang Rai International Airport since 24 January. A number of suspected cases have been found to have other common respiratory conditions.

On 11 February, the Holland America Line-operated MS Westerdam was refused permission to dock at Laem Chabang port by the country's Marine Department. The ship was previously denied entry to the Philippines, Japan, South Korea, and Guam due to similar fears.

On 13 February, two cruise ships, the MV Seabourn Ovation anchored at the Phuket Deep Sea Port and the Quantum of the Seas docked at Phuket's Patong pier. Unlike the MS Westerdam, the two ships were allowed because both had planned to make their first stop in Thailand and would depart to Singapore afterwards. The passengers on board were screened by public health officials before being given permission to step ashore.

On 17 February, a meeting between Ministry of Foreign Affairs, Ministry of Public Health, AOT and the Immigration Bureau came to the conclusion to disallow entry of all foreigners from MS Westerdam to the country after an American woman tested positive for COVID-19 in Malaysia. The number of passengers who entered Thailand before the ban was 95, 91 were transferred to connecting flights and had already left the country.

On 18 February, the health authorities had extended COVID-19 screening to cover visitors from Japan and Singapore. Passengers from these countries were treated with the same method as passengers on flights from Mainland China. The Ministry of Public Health also raised measures against COVID-19 to level 3 in preparation for a surge in transmission. Every province must have at least one hospital capable of testing for COVID-19. The Department of Medical Sciences is currently developing a virus test kit that will deliver a result in five minutes, which is planned to be available within two months.

On 21 February, the Ministry of Public Health announced a new screening criteria, with additional surveillance for visitors from Hong Kong, Macau, South Korea and Taiwan. People developing pneumonia due to unknown causes and living in eight provinces that were popular among Chinese tourists including Bangkok, Chiang Mai, Chiang Rai, Chon Buri, Krabi, Phuket, Prachuap Khiri Khan and Samut Prakan, would be automatically considered as COVID-19 suspected cases.

Further restrictions were announced on 19 March, requiring medical certification for international arrivals, and also health insurance for foreigners.

On 3 April, the Civil Aviation Authority of Thailand ordered that there would be a ban on all passengers flights landing in Thailand from the morning of 4 April to the evening of the 6 April. On the evening of 6 April, the flight ban was further extended to 18 April, and now to 30 April.

On 15 July 2021, it became possible for vaccinated holidaymakers from overseas to visit three islands in the Surat Thani province; Koh Samui, Koh Tao and Koh Phangan. The decision follows the reopening of Phuket, Thailand's largest island, on Thursday, July 1. Prior to October 2022, prior to arrival foreign tourists were required to obtain a Certificate of Entry, travel insurance of at least US$100,000 for medical expenses and prepaid reservations at a government-approved hotel. Once on the ground, travelers were subject to several PCR tests at their own expense. These restrictions were lifted in October 2022.

Starting on 1 November 2021, arrivals from 63 countries designated as low-risk were allowed to enter with only a one-day quarantine, while they awaited a negative test result. The Test and Go program required travellers to be fully vaccinated and have received a negative RT-PCR test result before travel. On 21 December, the program was suspended in response to the first reported local transmission of the Omicron variant a day earlier.

On 1 February 2022 Thai authority resume Test & Go program with additional rule that travelers will be required to take two RT-PCR tests, one on the first day and another on the fifth day. and from 1 March 2022 Thailand revised COVID-19 test requirement from 2 PCR Test (1st Day, 5th Day) to 1 PCR and 1 Self-ATK (PCR 1st day, ATK 5th day).

Starting 1 May 2022, fully-vaccinated travellers will NOT require RT-PCR on arrival but still need Thailand Pass. ATK is voluntary only.

==== Restrictions on travellers from risk areas ====
As of 22 March, the Ministry of Public Health defined two types of risk areas:

Dangerous Disease Infected Zones

The Civil Aviation Authority of Thailand (CAAT) is requiring travellers from all countries to show medical certificates prior to boarding their flights to Thailand and after arriving in Thailand when entering immigration checkpoints or their journey will not be allowed. Also, the traveller must seek quarantine in government-managed places for 14 days with no exception.

=== Medical supply regulations ===
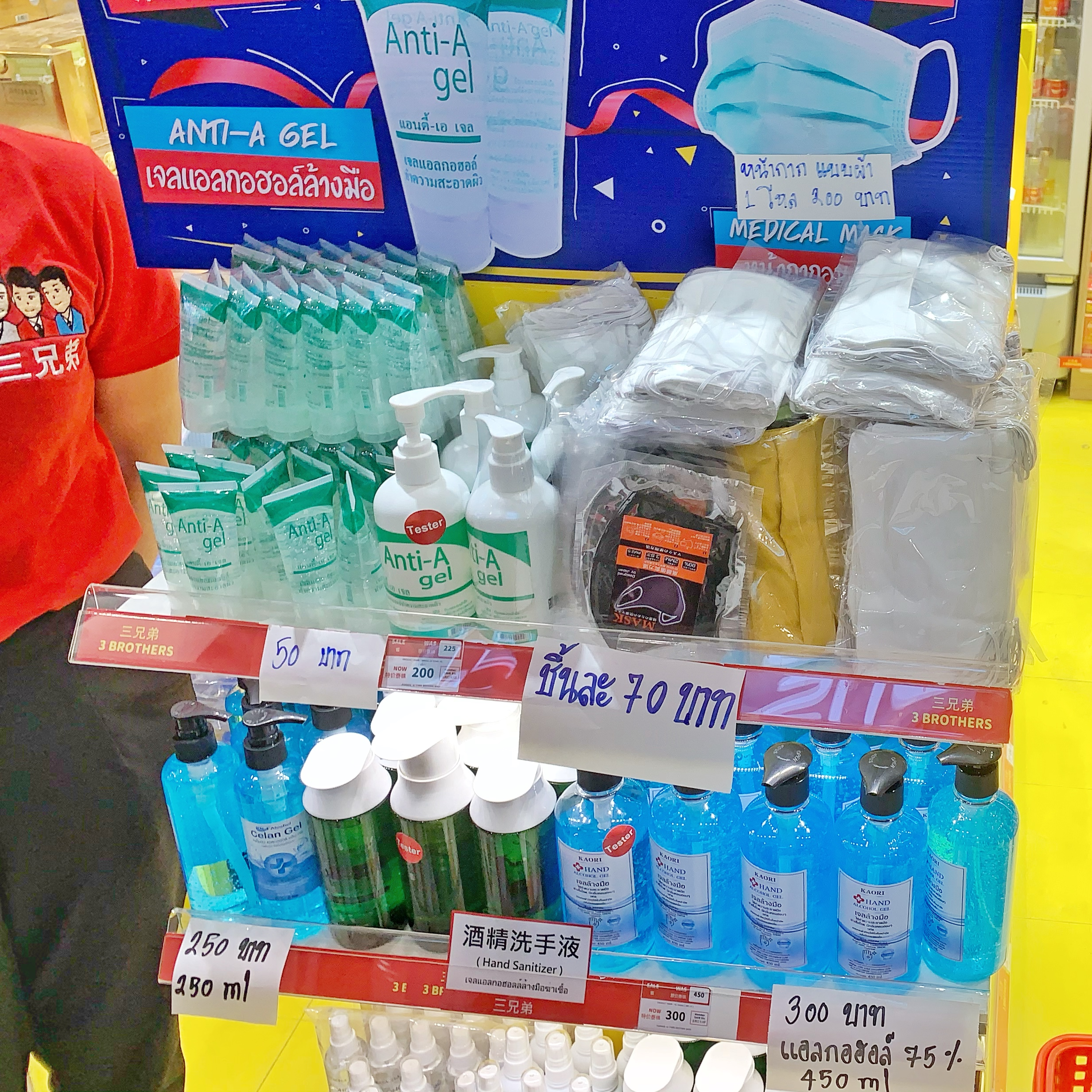
A booth in a Bangkok shopping centre selling surgical masks for ฿70 per piece, almost 70 times higher than before the pandemic

On 4 February 2020, the government announced that four products, namely surgical masks, polypropylene, alcohol-based hand sanitisers and toilet paper, are to be designated as controlled goods under the Price of Goods and Services Act, B.E. 2542 (1999) following a cabinet resolution.

On 6 February 2020, Prime Minister Prayut Chan-o-cha warned that the stockpiling and price gouging of surgical masks and hand sanitisers could lead to legal consequences.

On 12 March 2020, health officials encouraged people to make face masks at home out of cloth, stating that cloth masks can prevent droplets bigger than one micron from spreading.

=== Lockdown, curfew, and inter-provincial travel ban ===
Inside of partially-opening Iconsiam shopping complex where majority of stores were forced to close, except supermarkets, chemists and takeaway restaurants (April 2020)

On 21 March 2020, Bangkok City Hall authorities declared a wide-ranging shutdown of various businesses. Bangkok Governor Aswin Kwanmuang disclosed after the City Hall meeting that the board had passed a resolution to close establishments under Section 35 of the Communicable Diseases Act B.E. 2558 (2015), effective for a period of 22 days from 22 March to 12 April 2020. This was then extended from 12 April 2020 to 30 April 2020. Only supermarkets, pharmacies, and takeaway restaurants will be allowed to stay open at the malls.

The government issued a curfew to take effect on 3 April 2020 between 10pm-4am in order to limit the spread. The government has additionally issued a travel ban for all foreigners entering Thailand. Some critics of the government have been arrested for allegedly spreading false information about the coronavirus pandemic.

The curfew was cut from 10–4 to 11–4, then 11-3 and officially ended on 15 June 2020.

Early April 2021, Bangkok's entertainment venues were ordered to be closed for 2 weeks. Mid-April 2021, schools were ordered to be closed for 2 weeks, taking the 2000+ daily cases into consideration. Since 26 April, more businesses including gyms closed for 2 weeks.

=== Tracking application ===
Since May, the authority adopted a tracking application named "Thai Chana" [th] (lit. Thai wins) to track people who had entered an enclosed building, then would send a notice to anybody who were in there at the same time with a COVID-19 patient if later tested positive. However, critics questioned its benefits and there were reports of spam.

=== Wastewater surveillance ===
Study from Faculty of Medicine, Chulalongkorn University report SARS-CoV-2 RNA was present in the human wastewater collected from both the Bangkok city center and suburbs with increasing concentrations from October to December. This is the first dataset related to SARS-CoV-2 RNA in wastewater in Bangkok. Except for July, August and December there were no statistically significant differences in RNA copy numbers from the city center or suburbs. Between October and November, a sharp rise in copy number was observed in both places followed by two to three times increase in December, related to SARS-CoV-2 cases reported for same month. Interestingly, in December, the number of SARS-CoV-2 RNA copies from the city center and suburbs in wastewater increased, reflecting the increased number of positive SARS-CoV-2 patients. Study result suggests that a higher copy number of the viral genome could correlate with an elevation in infected people in the community and positive cases may be much higher than the reported numbers.

=== Health education ===
Public education focused on self-monitoring for at-risk groups, practising hygiene (especially hand washing), and avoiding crowds (or wearing masks if avoidance was not possible).

=== Communication ===
Prayut ordered crackdown on social media posts that the government deemed "fake news," accusing the people who did so of hampering the authorities' effort against the pandemic. The police also stressed that the crime may faced with a maximum of two years imprisonment under the Emergency Decree. In July 2021, after numerous reports of homeless people dying in the streets of Bangkok, some officials blamed the incidents as being set up to discredit the authorities.

=== Vaccine ===
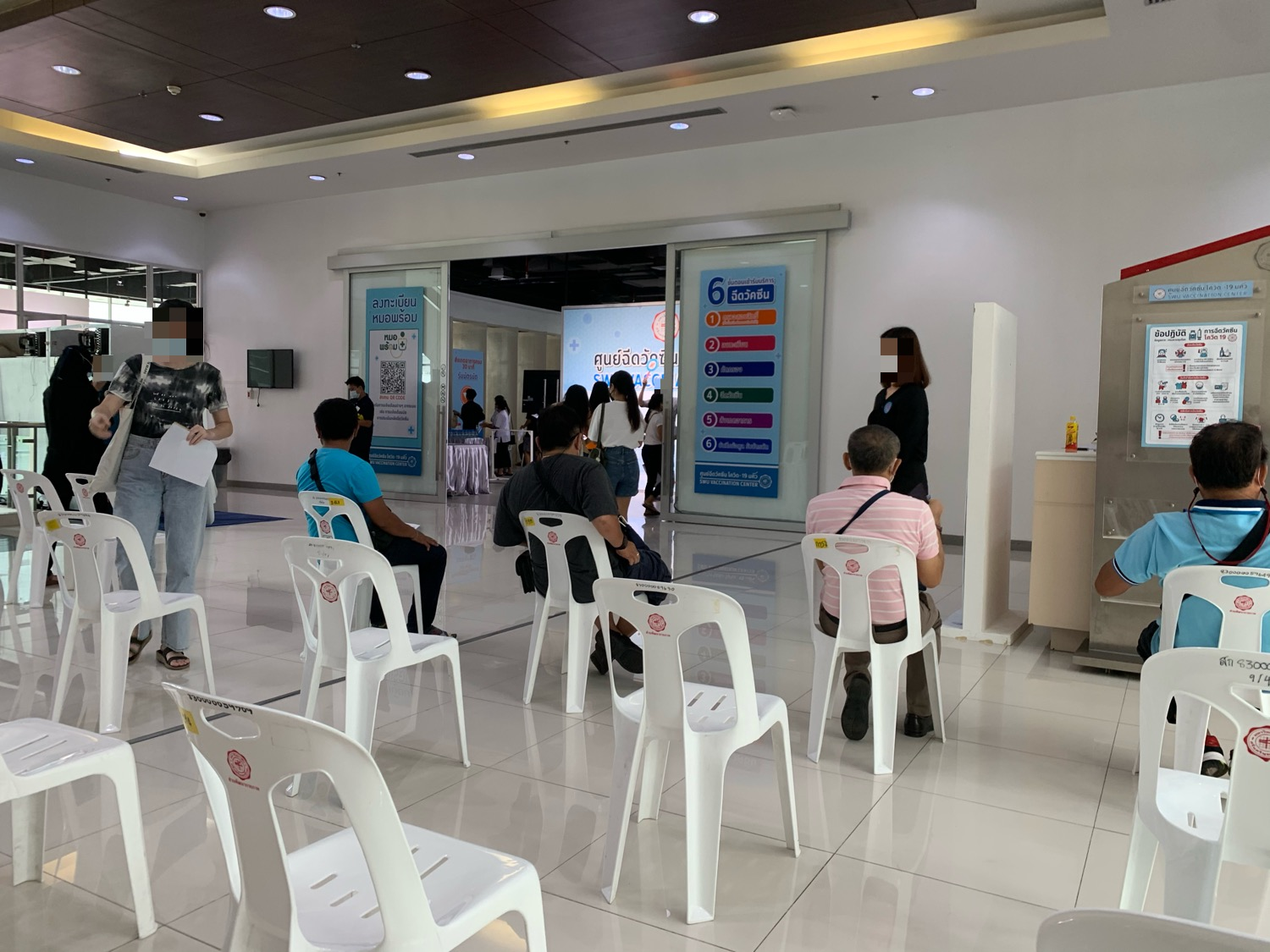
A vaccination center at Srinakharinwirot University in Bangkok

In November 2020, the authorities ordered 26 million doses of vaccine from AstraZeneca, which reported 70% overall efficacy. It requires two doses of vaccine per person, so the quantity ordered would only cover 13 million people. Prayut cabinet later approved budget for ordering 35 million additional doses in January 2021. Siam Bioscience, a company owned by King Vajiralongkorn, will received technological transfer for co-investment. The authorities would also imported two million doses of vaccine from Sinovac Biotech, a Chinese company which Thai conglomerate Charoen Pokphand invested in, during February to April 2021.

Likewise, the Thai government also stepped up its attempt to produce its homegrown vaccines amidst criticism, with "ChulaCov19" and set to begin trials in May 2021. Phase I testing of the NDV-HXP-S vaccine began at Mahidol University in March 2021.

The 1.5 million dose of Pfizer vaccine donated by the US government arrived in Thailand in early August 2021. Half of the said amount was allocated to health workers, even though the Ministry of Public Health said earlier that all would be allocated to them. Some hospitals reported allocation cuts.

== Impact ==
=== Economy ===
2020 GDP growth rate forecast by Asian Development Bank
(by percentage)
View source data.

Sources: Asian Development Bank (ADB)

Bangkok Airways announced a plan to cut their executives' salaries, reduce the number of flights, and cancel some routes; staff will be on leave without pay for 10–30 days starting from 1 March 2020 due to the economic downturn and the outbreak of COVID-19.

The United Nations Industrial Development Organization released a report in June 2020 reported that 90% or more of firms expect revenue loss of more than 50% compared to last year. Automotive sectors had a drop in manufacturing performance index (MPI) in April 2020, about 82% year on year, showing the lowest production since 1987. Four other leading negatively affected sectors include petroleum and petroleum products, malts and malt beverage, air conditioning systems, and sugar. On the other hand, sectors which had an increase in MPI include concrete and cement, medicine, electronic circuitboard, frozen seafood, and animal feeds, of which MPI increased ranging from 10% to almost 40% year on year.

In September 2020, World Bank forecast that Thai economy would contract 8.9% by the end of the year.

=== Education ===
On 29 February, The 38th Thailand National Book Fair and 18th Bangkok International Book Fair at Impact, Muang Thong Thani were cancelled. It was instead hosted online, making it the first "online national book fair" of Thailand. Chulalongkorn and Mahidol Universities, following the confirmation of COVID-19 cases among its staff and student body, began suspending classes on 16 March, while Kasetsart University took the same action as a precautionary measure.

=== Sports ===
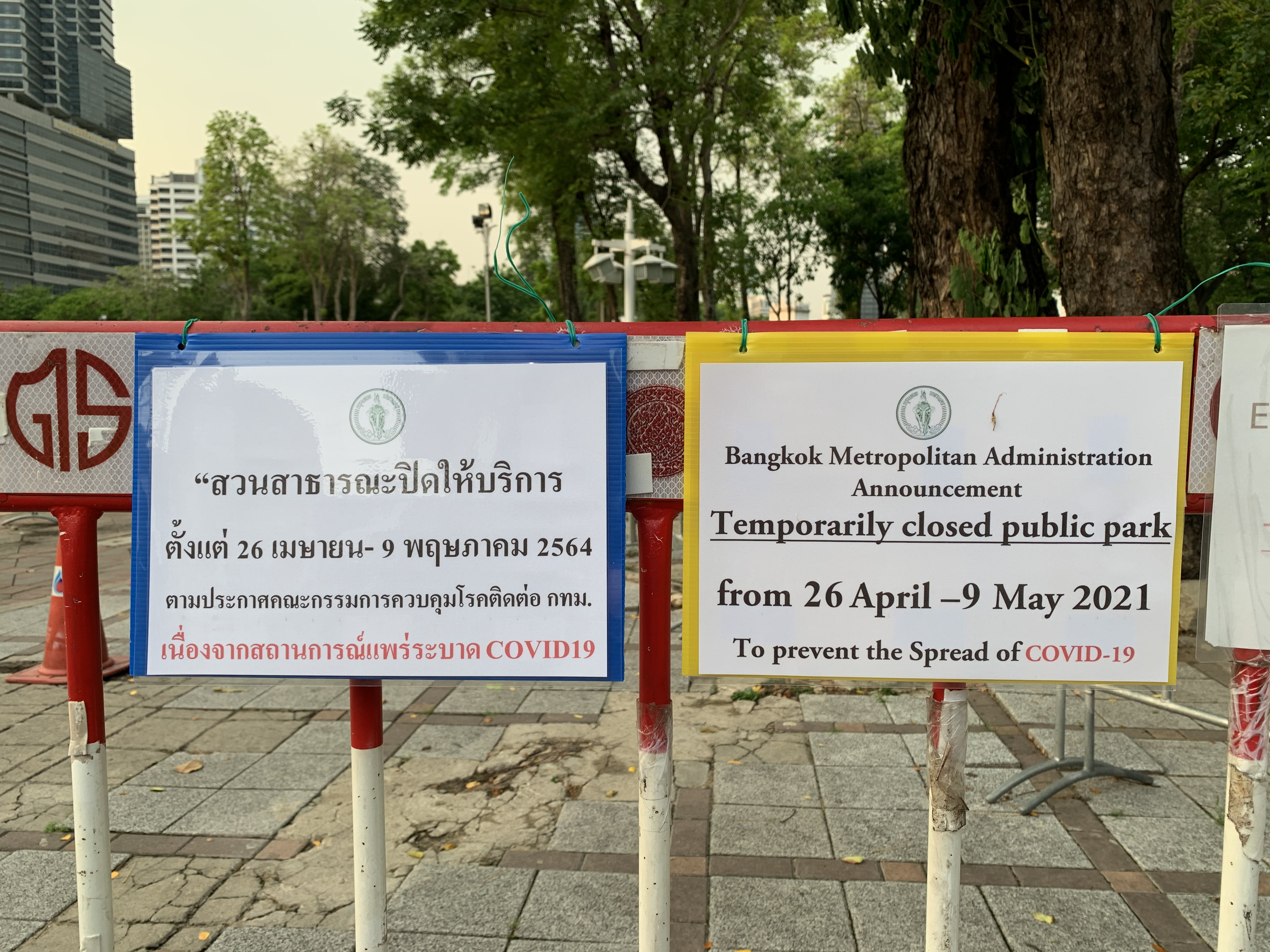
Lumphini Park, a public park in Bangkok closed due to restrictions imposed in 2021

The "THAI FIGHT" boxing tournament in Chiang Rai has been postponed indefinitely due to concerns of COVID-19.

On 1 March 2020, the Football Association of Thailand decided that all Thai League professional football matches in T1, T2, T3 and T4 between 7 and 31 March will be played behind closed doors as broadcast only events. However, on 4 March 2020, the decision was changed to postpone all matches prior to 18 April indefinitely.

The 2020 MotoGP Thailand Grand Prix was postponed due to the spread of the virus. The event has been put off until the outbreak has abated.

The 41st Bangkok International Motor Show, which was originally scheduled between 7 March to 5 April, has been postponed. The new schedule will be announced later.

Channel 7 Boxing Stadium will continue fights behind closed doors as broadcast only events, according an official statement by the channel.

=== Tourism ===
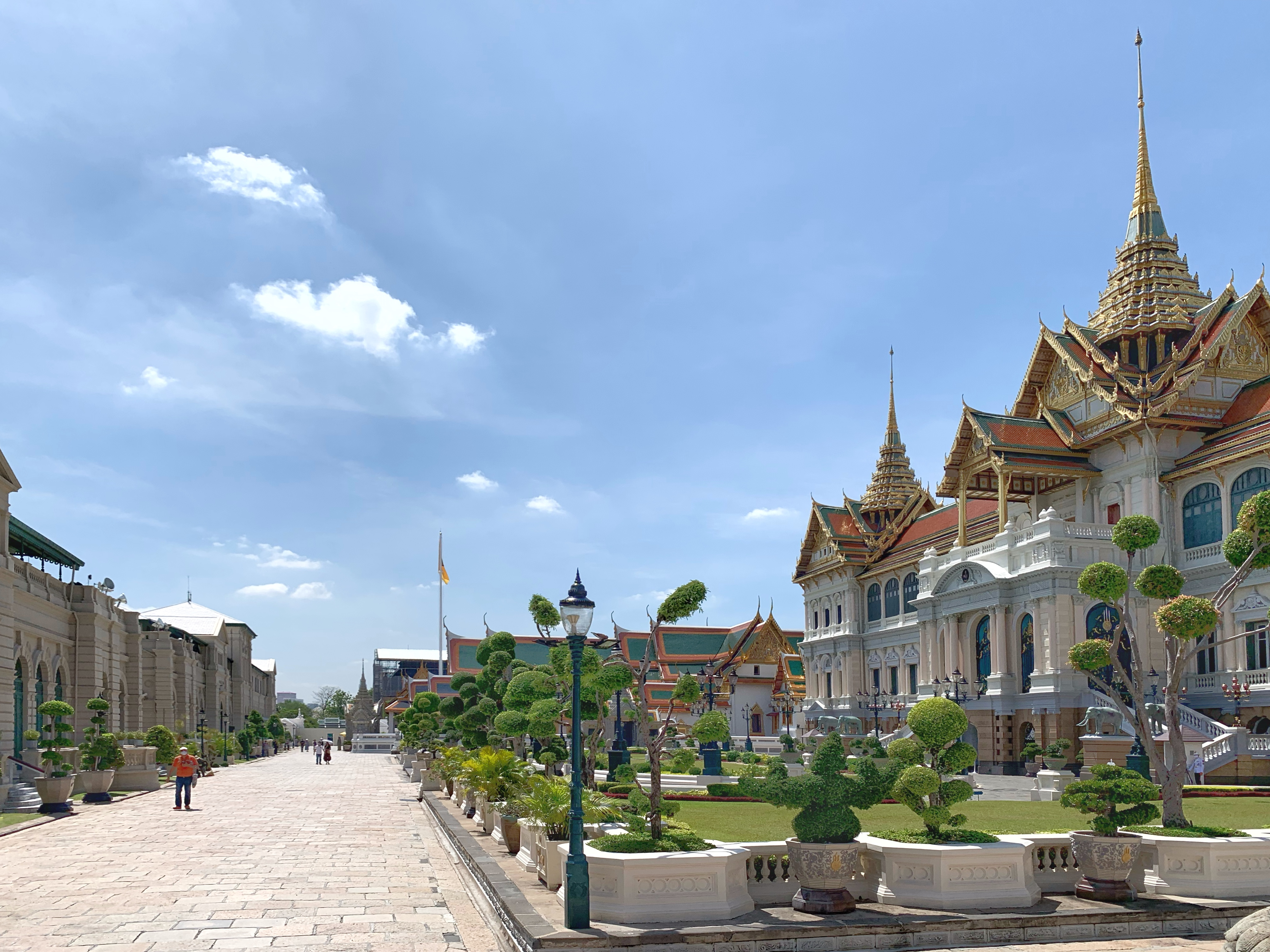
Grand Palace, a major tourist attraction in Bangkok, gone empty with no foreign tourist. (June 2020)

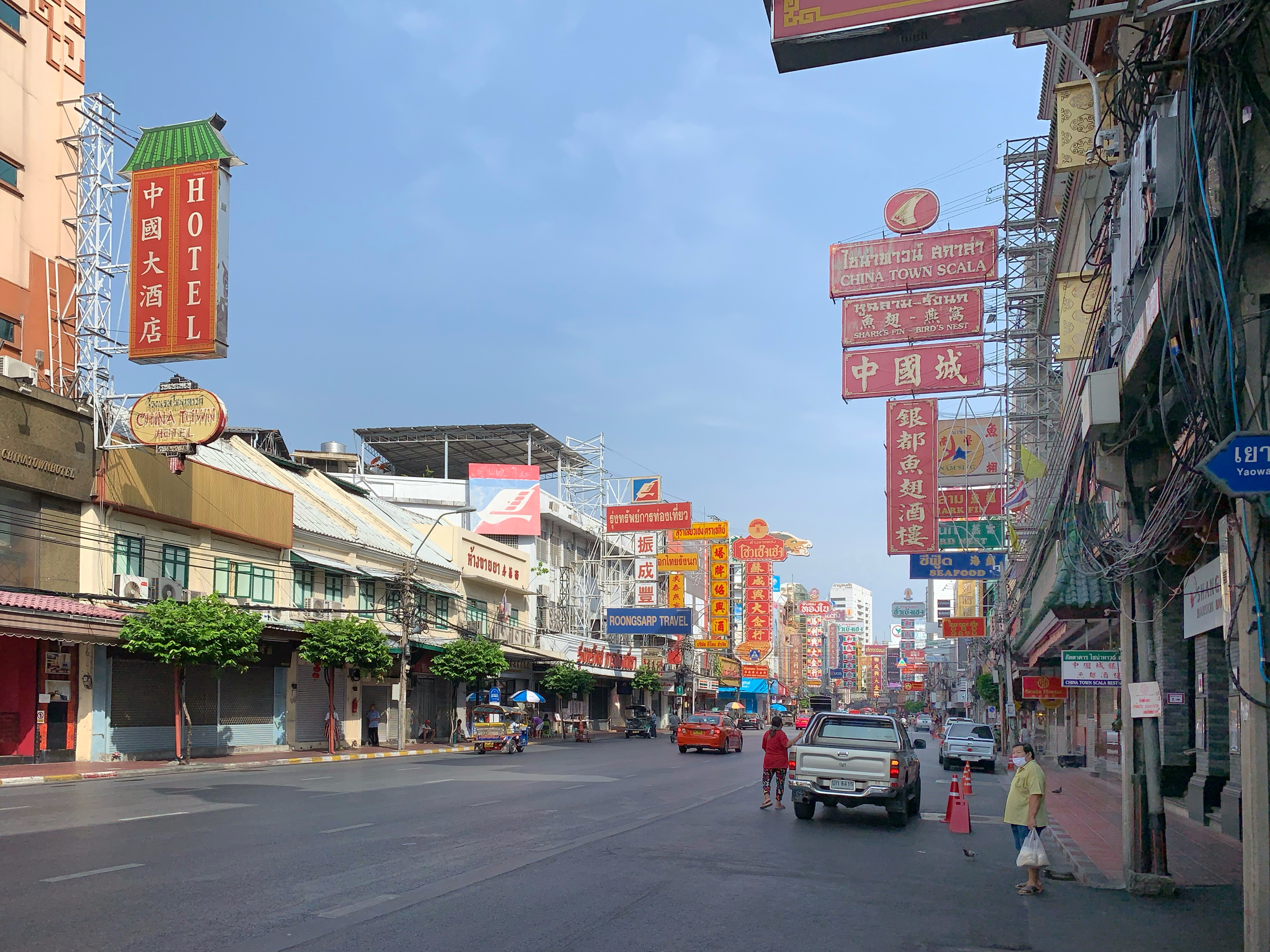
Yaowarat, one of Bangkok's crowded tourist street became empty during the pandemic. (May 2020)

Thailand's tourist industry, which accounts for one-fifth of GDP prior to the pandemic, has been severely affected; the Tourism Authority of Thailand anticipates total tourist arrivals for 2020 to decline by as much as 65%. In the January–March period, foreign tourist arrivals fell by 38% to 6.69 million; Chinese arrivals, the largest source of inbound tourists, plunged 60% to 1.25 million. With its border closed and most international flights cancelled since 4 April, tourist arrivals and spending have both dropped to zero in April, compared to 3.2 million arrivals and $4.6 billion's worth of receipts in the same month last year.

Legend Siam, a theme park in Pattaya, will temporarily close from 3 March because of the lack of tourists during the spread of the virus. The park management promised to hire all staff back when it eventually reopens.

On 16 March, the Ministry of Public Health announced that Songkran holidays and celebrations will be postponed until further notice as the number of cases continued to rise by 33 to 147. The Songkran festival in Khaosan Road, Khon Kaen Province, Pattaya, Bang Saen Beach and Patong will not be held, according to each municipality's announcement. The dates of the holiday are to be postponed as well. Ko Pha-ngan District Chief Somchai Somwong made the decision to suspend a party on Rin Beach to avoid the gathering of tourists, which could pose a risk of virus outbreak. The party had originally been scheduled on the full-moon night of 8 March.

Brian Tan and Shreya Sodhani at Barclays argued that the need for quarantine would mean "the return of tourists could be relatively slow".

=== Xenophobia and racism ===
A restaurant in Chiang Mai displayed a sign which read "We apologize we are not accepting CHINESE customers. Thank you", after a customer left the restaurant upon noticing a group of Chinese people inside. The police demanded that the sign be taken down, but suggested that it could be rewritten in Chinese as "We ran out of food". A similar sign was seen outside a restaurant in Ao Sane Beach in Phuket.

Health minister Anutin Charnvirakul posted negative comments on Twitter about "dirty" Westerners, saying they "never shower" and are more likely to spread the virus than Asians. The post attracted negative reaction in Thailand and the UK and was quickly removed. Mr. Charnvirakul stated the tweet was posted by his staff and not by him personally.

Online hate speech against Myanmar surged after the December outbreak among migrant workers in Samut Sakhon. Prayut blamed the COVID-19 resurgence on illegal immigration.

=== Criticism of government response ===
The government has been criticised for various aspects of its response to the crisis, especially over its early handling of the pandemic, slow procurement of vaccines, and the April 2021 outbreak.

In early February 2020, in response to concerns over hoarding and price gouging of face masks, the government issued price controls and intervened in their distribution. The move failed to prevent shortages among hospitals, and became a scandal over perceived corruption and siphoning of supplies. Criticism was also aimed at the government's inconsistent policy over international travel and quarantine requirements, indecisiveness and slowness to act, and poor communication—many official announcements were made available to the public, only to be quickly retracted or contradicted by other government units, and later changed. The abrupt closure of Bangkok businesses prompted tens of thousands of workers to travel to their hometowns, reflecting the failure among agencies to coordinate a unified response. After the virus's third wave in April 2021, the government was criticized for failing to acquire a sufficient stock of vaccines.

== Possible spread to other countries ==
South Korea

On 4 February 2020, a South Korean woman, who recently visited Bangkok on a vacation, was tested positive and confirmed as the 16th case of the country

Germany

On 4 March 2020, Cologne city government announced five confirmed cases, including a woman who was previously on vacation in Thailand and is believed to have been infected there.

Australia

On 5 March 2020, Queensland government confirmed that an 81-year-old man who has recently returned from Thailand tested positive and was admitted to Sunshine Coast University Hospital.

India

On 6 March 2020, India reported its 31st confirmed case. The patient is an Indian national who has a travel history from Thailand and Malaysia.

Egypt

In May 2021, the UK authorities reported that they found a COVID-19 variant that was first discovered in Thailand from immigrants from Egypt.

== Transition to endemic management ==
On 1 June 2022, the Ministry of Public Health shut down its COVID-19 location tracking app MorChana in anticipation of endemic classification of the disease. The decision was made given improvements in the local situation, and since arriving people are no longer required to use the app. The Ministry plans to declare COVID-19 an endemic disease on 1 July, with that from 23 June 2022, mask wearing is optional outdoors at the countryside areas (such as Phuket and Don Mueang) whereas mask wearing is still mandatory at indoors and at crowded areas such as Bangkok and on public transport.

On 8 August 2022, Anutin Charnvirakul, the chair of the National Communicable Disease Committee announced that COVID-19 would be downgraded from a "dangerous communicable disease" to a "communicable disease under surveillance" as part of the country's plan to enter a normal endemic period.

== Statistics ==
=== Charts ===
==== Cumulative number of confirmed cases, recoveries, active cases and deaths ====
View source data.

==== Confirmed new cases per day ====
View source data.

==== Confirmed deaths per day ====
View source data.

==== Confirmed recoveries per day ====
View source data.

== See also ==
- Timeline of the COVID-19 pandemic
- Timeline and statistics of the COVID-19 pandemic in Thailand
