= Nanocovax =

Vaccine candidate against COVID-19

Vaccine description
- Target: SARS-CoV-2
- Vaccine type: Protein subunit

Clinical data
- Routes of administration: Intramuscular

Identifiers
- CAS Number: 2695523-49-8

Nanocovax is a Vietnamese COVID-19 vaccine candidate developed by Nanogen Pharmaceutical Biotechnology JSC. It is a subunit vaccine (SARS‑CoV‑2 recombinant spike protein with aluminum adjuvant).

== Medical uses ==
The vaccine requires two doses, administered 28 days apart. It is given by intramuscular injection.

== Clinical trials ==
The Vietnamese health ministry has assessed the Nanocovax vaccine produced by Nanogen as the most promising, having been successfully produced on a laboratory scale and provoked immunogenicity during animal testing.

=== Preclinical and phase I ===
Preclinical studies of Nanocovax were conducted on hamsters and non-human primates, including a challenge test, exposing hamsters to the SARS-CoV-2 virus. On 17 December 2020, Nanogen commenced human trials of Nanocovax vaccine.

The clinical trial Phase 1 (open-label, dose-escalation) recruited 60 healthy Vietnamese adult volunteers to evaluate the safety, tolerability, and initial assessment of immunogenicity of the vaccine intramuscularly in the participants. The first-stage trials of Nanocovax showed the vaccine was safe and vaccinated volunteers had antibodies against the Alpha variant.

=== Phase II ===
On 26 February 2021, the pharmaceutical company began second phase trials in two places, Hanoi and southern province of Long An. The clinical trial Phase 2 (randomization, double-blind, multicenter, placebo-controlled) enrolled 560 healthy volunteers to evaluate the safety, immunogenicity, and determined the optimal dose of the vaccine intramuscularly in participants, with 160 volunteers receiving each dose of the vaccine and 80 receiving the placebo. From 25 March to 6 April, volunteers receiving the first jabs in phase II between 26 February and 10 March were given the second shots of the Nanocovax vaccine. Some volunteers experienced side effects around the injection site, yet did not require medical intervention.

Results of the trial issued in April 2021 show the homegrown COVID-19 vaccine is safe. According to the trial results, people injected with 25mcg dose got the highest index with more than 90% at 14 days after the second shot and 42 days since the first doses. The research team had submitted a report to the Research Ethics Committee of the Ministry of Health and proposed a plan for the third phase of human trials. Dose strength of 25 mcg is selected for phase 3 to evaluate the vaccine efficacy.

==== Safety outcome ====
Local adverse effects including pain were reported in 32.6% and 32.1% of the subjects after the first and the second doses, respectively. Systemic effects including fatigue and headache were found in about 16.9% and 13.3% of participants after each injection, respectively. Fever was rare but was reported in 3.8% of participants after both doses.

SAEs were rare; however, severe back pain was reported in three patients, whereas one patient exhibited serious sepsis, and another patient experienced a severe sore throat. Milder adverse effects such as cough and sore throat were seen in less than 5% of subjects.

Overall, adverse events were observed within two days and often resolved in seven days. No obvious relationship was observed between dose escalation and adverse events. The rate of adverse events was about 27% and 34% in the vaccinated and placebo groups, respectively.

Laboratory aberrations such as hyperglycemia and leukocytosis were also reported. However, neither phase paused vaccinations because of adverse events. Some of the events, such as angina following a stent graft, sepsis, abscesses, personal injury, and anaphylaxis, were not related to the vaccination, the scientists found.

==== Immunogenicity outcome ====
Geometric mean concentration (GMC) of anti-S IgG (BAU/ml) was reported. Before the 1st injection, anti-S IgG level of the all groups were all below the lower limit of detection (1 BAU/ml). Anti-S IgG of the vaccines groups increased remarkably after the 2nd injection (day 28). At day 35, anti-S IgG levels of group Nanocovax 25 mcg, 50 mcg and 75 mcg were 147.8 BAU/ml, 204.5 BAU/ml, and 284.3 BAU/ml, respectively. At day 42, their respective anti-S IgG increased sharply: 1318.5, 1070.6 and 1246.5 BAU/ml, respectively. By day 90, their respective anti-S IgG levels dropped to 354.5, 342.9, and 394.1 BAU/ml but were still higher than IgG level of convalescent group (154.8 BAU/ml). Anti-S IgG levels of the placebo group on days 35, 42 and 90 were 6.33, 6.28, and 6.28 BAU/ml, respectively.

Geometric mean fold rise (GMFR) of anti-S IgG was defined as the fold increase in GMC of a given timepoint compared to baseline GMC value of the same group at day 0. GMFR of groups Nanocovax 25 mcg, 50 mcg, 75 mcg at day 35 were 25.7, 34.7, and 49.8, respectively. At day 42, the GMFR of these respective groups were 229.0, 181.8 and 218.3. By day 90, GMFR of vaccinated groups decreased to 61.54, 58.21 and 69.01. Meanwhile, GMFR of the placebo group on days 35, 42 and 90 were 1.05, 1.04, and 1.04, respectively.

The seroconversion rate was defined as GMFR > 4. Based on the GMFR of anti-S IgG, the seroconversion rates of groups Nanocovax 25 mcg, 50 mcg and 75 mcg on day 35 were 84%, 84% and 85%. At day 42, the seroconversion rates of these respective groups were 100%, 99% and 100%. By day 90, seroconversion rates were still very high in vaccine groups: 100%, 100%, and 99.4%.

Surrogate virus neutralization test (sVNT) results were reported as mean inhibition rate (%). Up to day 28 (before 2nd vaccination), inhibition rates of all groups were below cut-off value of 30%. At day 35, mean inhibition of groups Nanocovax 25 mcg, 50 mcg, 75 mcg and placebo were 58.5%, 63.8% ,70.2%, and 11.1%, respectively. At day 42, their respective mean inhibition rates were 87.5%, 86.4%, 87.1%, and 10.8%. By day 90, respective sVNT were 72.7%, 74.2%, 74.4, and 19.1%. Meanwhile, mean inhibition rate of convalescent samples was 61.1%.

Neutralizing antibody levels were evaluated by plaque reduction neutralization test with inhibitory dilution greater than 50% (PRNT_{50}) and expressed as geometric mean titers (GMT). 112 serum samples of groups Nanocovax 25 mcg, 50 mcg, 75 mcg and placebo were randomly selected for PRNT_{50} on the original (Wuhan) strain and the UK variant. At day 35, GMT of groups Nanocovax 25 mcg, 50 mcg, 75 mcg were 20.9, 22.5 and 33.6, respectively. At day 42, their respective GMT were 89.2, 80.0 and 95.1. These were approximately 1.5 times higher than the GMT of convalescent samples (55.1). Meanwhile, GMT of group placebo at days 35 and 42 were 5 (half of limit of detection -LOD). Among 112 serum samples (at day 42) tested on Wuhan strain, a subset of 21 was randomly selected to evaluate neutralizing titer on Alpha variant (B.1.1.7). GMT in group Nanocovax 25 mcg, 50 mcg, 75 mcg on Alpha variant were 35.6, 56.57 and 40, an approximately 1.9-fold decrease, compared to the original strain.

Type 1 helper T cell (Th1) response of 84 randomly selected participants (28 for each vaccine group and 14 for placebo group) were undetectable. This was likely due to the nature of aluminum adjuvant which has been well established for Th2 response induction.

=== Phase III ===
The phase III study is the adaptive, multicenter, randomized, double-blind, placebo control study to evaluate the safety, immunogenicity, and efficacy of the Nanocovax vaccine against COVID-19 in volunteer subjects 18 years of age and older. The phase III human trials of Nanocovax was started on June 11, 2021, and being carried out on 13,000 people in Ha Noi, northern Hung Yen province and the Mekong Delta provinces of Tien Giang and Long An. Volunteers were administered with 25mcg – the only dose for this stage. Each person will receive two jabs. They are set to get second shots 28 days after the first one.

On September 18, 2021, the National Ethics Committee in Biomedical Research under the Ministry of Health (MoH) had reviewed and approved the clinical trial results of the phase III of Nanocovax. According to President of the National Ethics Committee in Biomedical Research, Professor Truong Viet Dung, Nanocovax vaccine is safe and produces immune response.

==== Safety outcome ====
The safety findings in the phase III study as of the time of data cut-off (August 30, 2021) are consistent with the safety findings of Nanocovax 25mcg in the phase I, II studies and continue to provide the evidence supports the safety profile of Nanocovax 25 mcg. Comparing the safety between the Nanocovax dose groups and the placebo injection group, the results recorded in this study showed that the Nanocovax vaccine was safe with no significant difference in safety between the Nanocovax injection group and the placebo group.

At the data cutoff date of August 30, 2021, the solicited local adverse events in the 7 days post-injection 1 in both the Nanocovax 25 mcg and placebo groups were similar. The incidence of pain at the injection site in the vaccine and placebo groups was 40.7% and 40.3%, respectively; pain sensitivity 26.7% and 26.4%; swelling at the injection site was 0.8% and 0.9%; redness at the injection site was 1% and 1.2%; pruritus at the injection site was 4.7% and 5%. Solicited local adverse events after dose 2 were numerically lower than those of dose 1 and were similar in both the Nanocovax 25mcg and placebo groups. The most common adverse event was pain at the injection site, which occurrence in the vaccine and placebo groups was 30.3% and 26.4%, respectively.

Several systemic adverse events were also reported, showing that the most common systemic adverse events within 7 days of injection 1 in the vaccine and placebo groups were: fatigue 23, 7% and 24.6%, headache 16% and 17.2%, myalgia 15.6% and 17.6%, joint pain 10% and 10.7%, nausea/vomiting 2.9% and 2.8%, diarrhea 3.1% and 3.3%, fever 3% and 3.4%. The solicited systemic adverse events after the 1st injection were reversible without sequelae. Solicited systemic adverse events 7 days after dose 2 were similar to those of dose 1 and were in balance between the vaccine and placebo groups. The most common solicited adverse events were: fatigue 15.4% and 13%, myalgia 9.2% and 8.8%, in the vaccine and placebo groups respectively. The others were mild and quickly recovered.

The incident of unsolicited adverse events was 0.69% in the vaccine group and 0.6% in the placebo group, including hypotension, vestibular disorders, knee pain, hand pain, hyperthyroidism, and upper respiratory tract inflammation. Almost all of the unsolicited adverse events were not related to the investigational products and the majority of unsolicited (non-SAE) adverse events in both vaccine and place groups were mild and moderate.

There were 40 serious adverse events (SAEs) (including COVID-19 cases) in both study groups (vaccine and placebo) in the trial, of which 36/40 SAEs were assessed as unrelated to the study product. Four SAEs were assessed as possibly related by the DSMB and investigator assessments, including Grade 2 anaphylactic reaction, Grade 2 allergic reactions, Grade 3 hypertension and Exacerbation of Chronic Obstructive Pulmonary Disease (COPD). All participants recovered completely.

==== Immunogenicity outcome ====
GMC of anti-S IgG binding antibody unit (BAU/ml) were shown. Before the 1st injection, anti-S IgG level of the vaccine and placebo groups were 5.7 and 6.1 BAU/ml, respectively. At day 42, anti-S IgG concentration of the vaccine group reached 1254.7 BAU/ml, while that of placebo group remained unchanged 5.9 BAU/ml. In addition, IgG response was negatively correlated with age. GMC anti-S IgG of 18–45, 46-60 and above 60 groups at day 42 were 1525.8, 983.9 and 900.7 BAU/ml, respectively. The correlation coefficient r was -0.2.

At day 42, the GMFR of vaccine group was 218.9. Meanwhile, GMFR of the placebo group was 0.96. Group age of 18-45 had the highest GMFR (269.7), followed by 46-60 (166.4) and above 60 (157.9). The seroconversion rate was defined as GMFR > 4. At day 42, the seroconversion rate of vaccine group was 100%.

Neutralizing antibody was qualitatively and quantitatively evaluated by sVNT and PRNT_{50}, respectively. sVNT results were reported as the percentage (%) of participants in each group positive for the assay. At day 0, 0.6% and 3.3% participants in the vaccine and placebo groups were positive for sVNT. At day 42, 96.4% in vaccine group was positive for the test but only 1.2% positive in placebo group.

Neutralizing antibody, assessed by PRNT_{50}, was expressed as GMT. A number of serum samples from vaccine and placebo groups at day 42 were randomly selected to assess neutralizing antibody titer on the original (Wuhan) strain, the Alpha variant and the Delta variant. GMT of neutralizing antibody on the Wuhan, Alpha and Delta were 57, 36.2 and 29.6, respectively. Meanwhile, GMT of neutralizing antibody in placebo group was 10 (half of lower limit of detection). We found the neutralizing antibody level induced by Nanocovax exceeded that of convalescent samples.

Type 1 and type 2 helper T cell (Th1/Th2) response on 77 randomly selected participants (66 in vaccine group and 11 in placebo group) were evaluated by ICS for IFNg and IL-4 signal. IL-4 signal was dominant to IFNg signal at day 42, suggesting aTh2 polarization induction by Nanocovax. These observation was consistent with the nature of aluminum adjuvant which has been well established for Th2 response induction.

==== Efficacy outcome ====
At the data cutoff date of August 30, 2021, the vaccine efficacy was yet to be concluded due to insufficiency of confirmed positive COVID-19 case. However, accumulated evidences have correlated neutralizing antibody level with the immunity against COVID-19. Khoury and Cromer et al. provided a model to predict the vaccine efficacy by comparing the neutralizing antibody titers of vaccines to those of convalescent samples. Accordingly, the neutralizing antibody titer of the Nanocovax injection group was 2 times higher than that of the recovered group, thereby estimating the protective effect to be about 90% against the original (Wuhan) strain, and 75% against infection of Delta variant. In addition, anti-S IgG antibody at 3 months after vaccination with Nanocovax vaccine was still higher than the antibody content of the convalescent group.

Comparing immunogenicity results of Nanocovax with those of COVID-19 convalescent patients evaluated by the Pasteur Institute in Ho Chi Minh City, as well as with the immunological results from other licensed vaccines, it was shown that the Nanocovax vaccine is effective in preventing COVID-19.

The National Ethics Committee for Biomedical Research concluded that the Nanocovax vaccine estimated protective efficacy based on the immunogenicity data of the research ensured scientific validity, qualified to transfer the dossier to the Advisory Council for consideration. Accordingly, all dossiers and data presenting information about the search for the only made-in-Vietnam COVID-19 vaccine have been submitted to the MoH's Advisory Council for the Registration of Circulation of Drugs and Medicinal Ingredients for emergency use authorization.

== Economics ==
The vaccine can cost up to 120,000 VND or around US$5.2 per dose. Nanogen currently possesses the ability to produce 10 to 20 million doses a year. The company is expecting to increase its capacity to 50-70 million doses a year to meet the domestic demand.

Nanocovax vaccine may be ready to deliver to the general public in the second half of 2021, if efficacy is shown. If the government goes ahead with the emergency decision, it may be rolled out in May, a Nanogen official told Nikkei Asia in February 2021. On 26 March 2021, Deputy Minister of Science and Technology Phạm Công Tạc and Deputy Prime Minister Vũ Đức Đam received the second dose of the Nanocovax COVID-19 vaccine.

On 22 June 2021, General Director of Nanogen said in an interview that the company had applied for an emergency authorization of Nanocovax in Vietnam the week before.
