= Illegal immigration to Thailand =

Thailand has become a major destination of illegal immigration, especially from neighbouring countries.

== Demographics ==
As of 2005, it was confirmed by the Thai government that there are 1.8 million registered and legal foreign workers and illegal immigration is as much as 5 million in Thailand. These illegal migrants also include refugees and the percentage of the illegal migrant population is as respectively Indonesia, Bangladesh, Nepal, Myanmar/Burma, India, Vietnam, Sri Lanka, Pakistan, Africa and China.

There are also large numbers of westerners living and working illegally in Thailand, many of whom teach English or run internet-based small businesses and use tourist visas or other types of visa obtained using fake documentation to stay in the country long-term.

== North Korean illegal immigrants ==
In recent years North Korean defectors have attempted to use Thailand as an entry route to get to South Korea. Some people continue working and staying in Thailand. By North Korean law, civilians cannot exit the country unless he/she was sent by government or was invited, which he/she has to go back and send report twice per year to North Korea.

== Illegal Rohingya migrants ==
At least 600 Rohingya Muslims believed to be illegal migrants from Myanmar detained were found in Thailand on 11 January 2013 after two raids by the authorities near the border with Malaysia. The Thai government has been criticized for its treatment of illegal immigrants. There may certainly be more Rohingya Refugees in Thailand however, legal and illegal.

== 1979 Immigration Act ==
A law passed in 1979, a time when many Vietnamese and Cambodian people were entering Thailand as refugees, gave authorities nearly unlimited powers to detain illegal immigrants indefinitely, with few guidelines regarding the treatment of detainees. The law also requires most resident foreigners to notify the government every time they leave their permanent residence for more than 24 hours. This law had fallen into disuse but as of 2019 has been revived due to a crackdown under the slogan "Good guys in, Bad guys out".

== See also ==
- Human trafficking in Thailand
