= Vabiotech COVID-19 vaccine =

Vaccine candidate against COVID-19

Vaccine description
- Target: SARS-CoV-2
- Vaccine type: Protein subunit

Clinical data
- Routes of administration: Intramuscular

Vabiotech COVID-19 vaccine is a COVID-19 vaccine candidate developed by the Vaccine and Biological Production Company No. 1 (Vabiotech) in Vietnam.

== Clinical trials ==
=== Preclinical ===
In May 2020, Vietnam declared that their COVID-19 vaccine was developed after scientists successfully generated the novel coronavirus antigen in the lab. The vaccine has been developed by collaborating scientists at VABIOTECH in Hanoi and the Bristol University. It will be tested further in animals and evaluated for safety and effectiveness before a manufacturing process is embarked on. According to the National Institute of Hygiene and Epidemiology, it will take at least 12–18 months to develop vaccine that can work safely on human. During the testing phase, researchers experimented by injecting mice in many ways and administering multiple antigen doses, with some mice injected with one or two doses of 3-10 micrograms each. After 10 days, 50 mice were in good health and being closely monitored for immune responses. After gaining positive results with immune response and antibody production, the trial vaccine would be developed into a complete and stable version qualified to be used on humans. The research team would also develop commercial production procedures for mass-production, including up to tens of millions of units.

In October 2020, the vaccine had been tested on 12 rhesus macaques (Macaca mulatta) in an island off the northern Quang Ninh province. The macaques are aged 3–5, weighing more than three kilograms each, and not infected with contagious diseases like tuberculosis or the HIV virus. Before being injected with the vaccine, they had their body temperatures, blood and swab samples taken and were kept separately in cages. They will be tested in two periods. In each period, they will be divided into two groups, with one being vaccinated and the other not. After that, they will be monitored daily on separate islands, before their blood samples are taken for further analysis. The testing will follow a similar model that maybe later performed on humans. The animals will be injected two shots of the vaccine, 18 to 21 days apart. A month after the second shot, researchers will assess the monkeys' immune response to see the difference between the injected group and the non-injected group. The result of these trials will be presented before the health ministry's ethical board within the following four months if experiments show the vaccine does produce effective immunogenicity and provide effective protection against COVID-19. It will be a foundation for the next stage for testing the vaccine on humans.
