= NDV-HXP-S =

Vaccine candidate against COVID-19

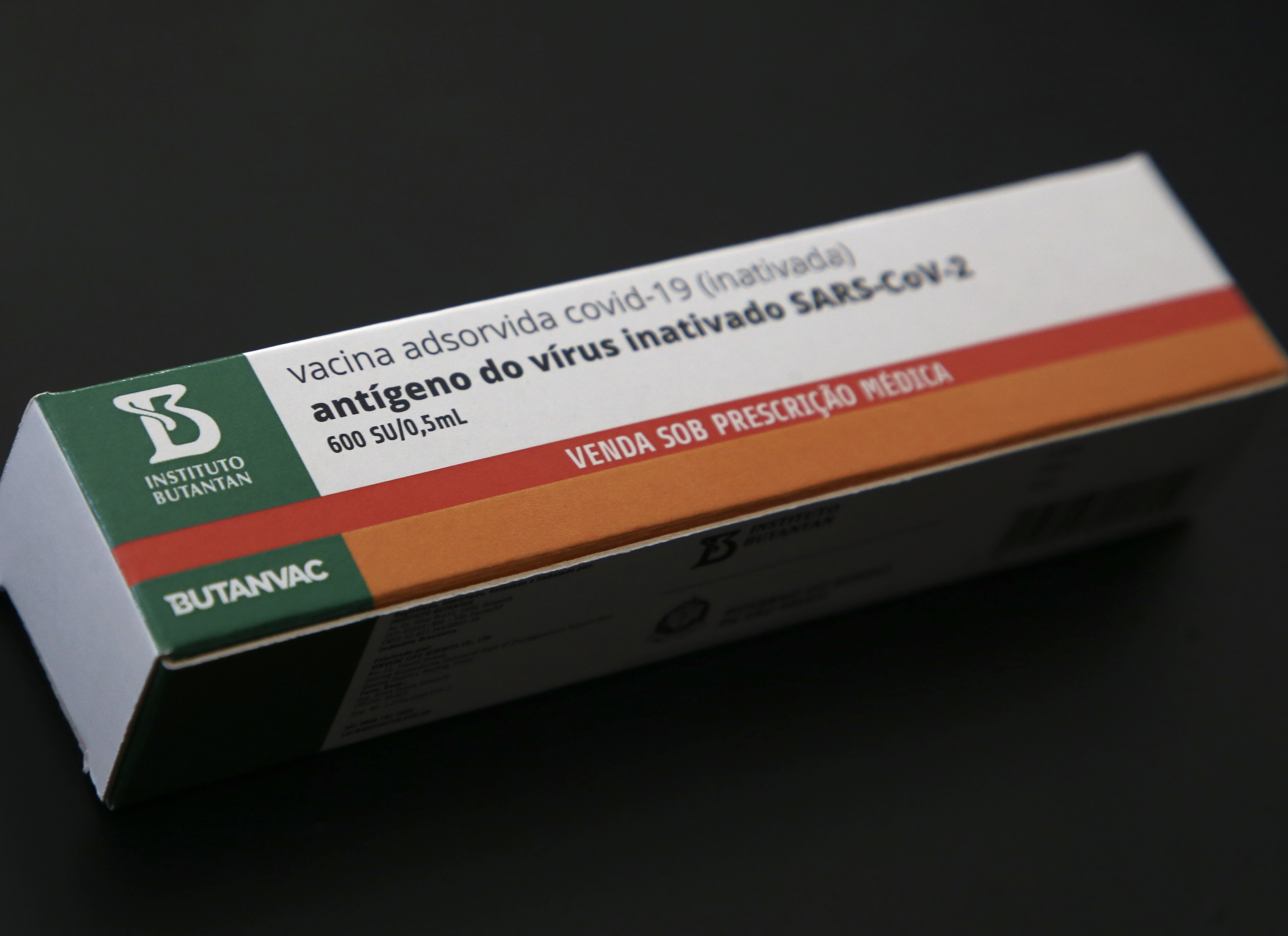
- Packaging for the Brazilian version of NDV-HXP-S, ButanVac

Vaccine description
- Target: SARS-CoV-2
- Vaccine type: viral vector or inactivated

Clinical data
- Trade names: ButanVac (Brazil); COVIVAC (Vietnam); HXP-GPOVac (Thailand); Patria (Mexico)
- Other names: ADAPTCOV
- Routes of administration: Intramuscular, Intranasal

NDV-HXP-S (known as ButanVac or ADAPTCOV in Brazil, COVIVAC in Vietnam, HXP-GPOVac in Thailand, Patria in Mexico) is a COVID-19 vaccine candidate developed under the leadership of Peter Palese, Adolfo García-Sastre, and Florian Krammer at the Icahn School of Medicine at Mount Sinai, in New York, United States.

The name NDV-HXP-S comes from the terms Newcastle disease virus, HexaPro, and spike protein. The stabilization of the S protein of SARS-CoV-2 (HexaPro) was achieved by Jason McLellan from the University of Texas at Austin.

== Pharmacology ==
NDV-HXP-S uses the Newcastle disease virus as its viral vector. The platform can be live or inactivated.

== Manufacturing ==
Unlike vaccines such as Moderna's mRNA-1273, the Janssen vaccine, and Pfizer–BioNTech's Tozinameran, which all require both specialized manufacturing facilities and also rare or expensive ingredients, NDV-HXP-S can be produced using chicken eggs in a fashion similar to influenza vaccine production, making it especially important to and for middle- and low-income countries. Those existing vaccines are based on the 2P spike, while NDV-HXP-S is further refined via the same process, resulting in a new spike called HexaPro; the 2P spike contained two prolines compared with HexaPro's six. It is also more resistant to heat and chemicals than the original 2P spike; the vaccine can be stored at 2–8 °C.

== History ==
=== Development ===
Its development was coordinated by the PATH Center for Vaccine Innovation and Access, and UT Austin and ISMMS have arranged royalty-free licensing agreements with labs and corporations in 80 countries. McLellan has noted that "the share of vaccines ['low- and middle-income countries' have] received so far is terrible".

=== Clinical trials ===
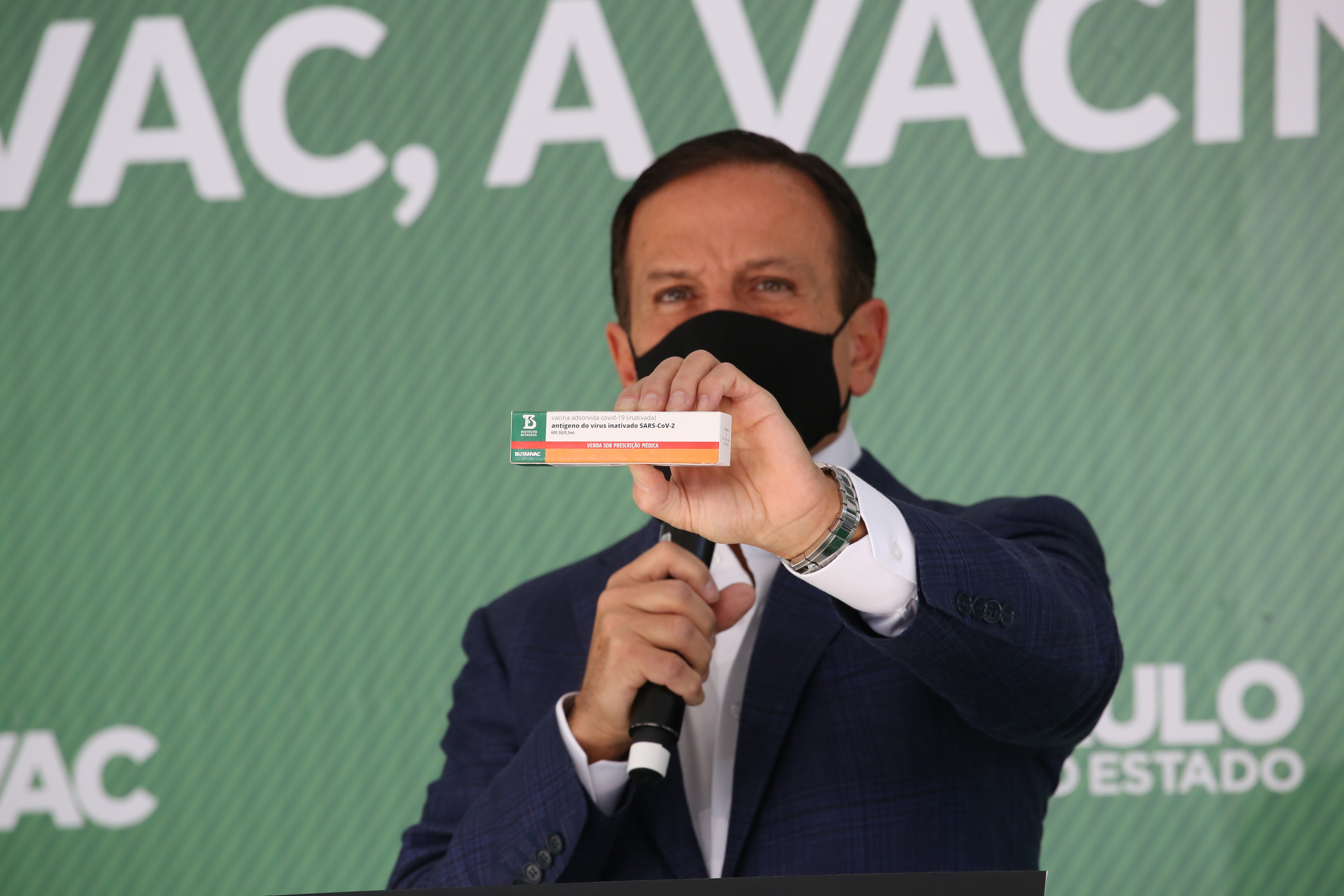
São Paulo governor João Doria displaying Butanvac at a press conference on March 26, 2021.

As of December 2021, NDV-HXP-S is undergoing clinical trials in humans in at least four countries. In Brazil, on March 26, 2021, the Butantan Institute announced it would seek to begin clinical trials. Mexico-based Avimex plans to create an intranasal spray version of the vaccine. In Thailand the Government Pharmaceutical Organization is conducting a trial in coordination with Mahidol University. Reflecting the freedom offered by the ease of the manufacturing process, Thai health minister Anutin Charnvirakul referred to the vaccine as "produced by Thai people for Thai people". A phase II study has been completed in Vietnam, but the phase III study has been discontinued due to shortage of unvaccinated volunteers.

The Butantan trials were discontinued at phase II in late 2023 due to lack of efficacy.
