= Timeline of the COVID-19 pandemic =

The timeline of the COVID-19 pandemic lists the articles containing the chronology and epidemiology of SARS-CoV-2. The first human cases of COVID-19 occurred in Wuhan, People's Republic of China, around 17 November 2019.

== Worldwide timelines by month and year ==
The 2019 and 30 January 2020 timeline articles include the initial responses as subsections, and more comprehensive timelines by nation-state are listed below this section.

Cases

Deaths

The following are the timelines of the COVID-19 pandemic in:

- 2019
- 2020
  - January 2020
  - February 2020
  - March 2020
  - April 2020
  - May 2020
  - June 2020
  - July 2020
  - August 2020
  - September 2020
  - October 2020
  - November 2020
  - December 2020
- 2021
  - January 2021
  - February 2021
  - March 2021
  - April 2021
  - May 2021
  - June 2021
  - July 2021
  - August 2021
  - September 2021
  - October 2021
  - November 2021
  - December 2021
- 2022
  - January 2022
  - February 2022
  - March 2022
  - April 2022
  - May 2022
  - June 2022
  - July 2022
  - August 2022
  - September 2022
  - October 2022
  - November 2022
  - December 2022
- 2023

=== Responses ===
The following are responses to the COVID-19 pandemic respectively in:

- 2020
  - January 2020
  - February 2020
  - March 2020
  - April 2020
  - May 2020
  - June 2020
  - July 2020
  - August 2020
  - September 2020
  - October 2020
  - November 2020
  - December 2020
- 2021
  - January 2021
  - February 2021
  - March 2021
  - April 2021
  - May 2021
  - June 2021
  - July 2021
  - August 2021
  - September 2021
  - October 2021
  - November 2021
  - December 2021
- 2022
  - January 2022
  - February 2022
  - March 2022
  - April 2022
  - May 2022
  - June 2022
  - July 2022
  - August 2022
  - September 2022
  - October 2022

== Timeline by region ==
Some of the timelines listed below also contain responses. The following are the timeline of the COVID-19 pandemic in:

=== Africa ===
- Egypt
- Ghana
  - Ghana (March–July 2020)
  - Ghana (August–December 2020)
  - Ghana (2021)
- Ivory Coast
- Nigeria
  - Nigeria (February–June 2020)
  - Nigeria (July–December 2020)
  - Nigeria (2021)
- South Africa

=== Americas ===
- Argentina
- Brazil
- Canada
  - Ontario (2020)
  - Ontario (2021)
  - Ontario (2022)
  - Quebec
  - Saskatchewan
- Mexico
- Trinidad and Tobago
- United States
  - United States (2020)
  - United States (2021)
  - California
  - Maryland
  - Massachusetts
    - Boston
  - New York City
  - Texas
- Uruguay
  - Uruguay (2020)
  - Uruguay (2021)

=== Asia ===
- Bangladesh
- India
  - India (January–May 2020)
  - India (June–December 2020)
  - India (2021)
  - Kerala
- Indonesia
  - Indonesia (2020)
  - Indonesia (2021)
  - Indonesia (2022)
- Iran
- Japan
- Malaysia
  - Malaysia (2020)
  - Malaysia (2021)
  - Malaysia (2022)
  - Malaysia (2023)
  - Malaysia (2024)
- Nepal
- Pakistan
- Philippines
  - Philippines (2020)
  - Philippines (2021)
  - Philippines (2022)
- Russia
  - Russia (January–June 2020)
  - Russia (July–December 2020)
- Singapore
  - Singapore (2020)
  - Singapore (2021)
  - Singapore (2022)
- Thailand
- Turkey
- Vietnam

=== Europe ===
- Belarus
- Croatia
- Ireland
  - Ireland (2020)
  - Ireland (2021)
  - Ireland (2022)
- Italy
- Malta
- Romania
- Serbia
- Spain
- Sweden
- United Kingdom
  - United Kingdom (January–June 2020)
  - United Kingdom (July–December 2020)
  - England (January–June 2020)
  - England (July–December 2020)
  - Northern Ireland (2020)
  - Scotland (2020)
  - Wales (2020)
  - United Kingdom (January–June 2021)
  - United Kingdom (July–December 2021)
  - England (2021)
  - Northern Ireland (2021)
  - Scotland (2021)
  - Wales (2021)
  - United Kingdom (January–June 2022)
  - United Kingdom (July–December 2022)
  - England (2022)
  - Wales (2022)
  - Scotland (2022)
  - Northern Ireland (2022)
  - United Kingdom (2023)
  - United Kingdom (2024)

=== Oceania ===
- Australia
  - Australia (2020)
  - Australia (January–June 2021)
  - Australia (July–December 2021)
  - Australia (2022)
- Fiji
- New Zealand
  - New Zealand (2020)
  - New Zealand (2021)
  - New Zealand (2022)
  - New Zealand (2023)
  - New Zealand (2024)

== See also ==
- COVID-19 pandemic deaths
