= Responses to the COVID-19 pandemic in October 2020 =

Aspect of the coronavirus outbreak

This article documents the chronology of the response to the COVID-19 pandemic in October 2020, which originated in Wuhan, China in December 2019. Some developments may become known or fully understood only in retrospect. Reporting on this pandemic began in December 2019.

== Reactions and measures in the United Nations ==
=== 1 October ===
In the Annual Report of the United Nations, the UN Secretary-General called for pandemic recovery to be assessed in "human rather than economic terms".

=== 2 October ===
The WHO Director-General wished both President Trump and the First Lady of the United States “a full and swift recovery" and called for strong leadership and comprehensive strategies so that countries could "change the trendlines" of the coronavirus pandemic.

=== 5 October ===
The WHO estimated that 10% of the world's population may have been infected with coronavirus, with 10 countries accounting for 70% of all reported cases and mortality, and only three countries accounting for half. The WHO also announced survey results showing that the pandemic has interrupted essential mental health services in 93% of countries surveyed.

=== 6 October ===
The UN High Commissioner for Human Rights (OHCHR) called on Iran to release imprisoned lawyers, human rights defenders, and political prisoners, citing concerns over the situation they are facing and the risk of their contracting COVID-19. The OHCHR, the UN Global Compact and the UN Working Group on Business and Human Rights, issued a joint statement calling for business to aid 400,000 seafarers stranded at sea by the pandemic. The head of UN ECLAC stated that economic recovery from the COVID-19 pandemic in Latin America and the Caribbean would likely be slower than the recovery following the subprime mortgage crisis.

=== 7 October ===
The World Trade Organization announced that global trade was showing signs of bouncing back from the COVID-19-induced depression, while warning that recovery could be severely disrupted by how the pandemic develops and how societies react. The UN Secretary-General launched his latest policy brief, COVID-19 and Universal Health Coverage, stating that pandemic had highlighted the importance of emergency preparedness and investing in robust public health systems.

=== 8 October ===
The UN Secretary-General, highlighting that "inadequate" global health care systems had contributed to the million deaths from the pandemic so far, stressed that universal health care was a key recommendation in the UN's COVID-19 and Universal Health Coverage policy brief.

=== 9 October ===
The UN reported that China, the Republic of Korea and Nauru had joined COVAX global vaccination programme during the week, raising the total of participating nations and economies to 171.

=== 10 October ===
The UN Secretary-General warned greater global cooperation was required, by Member States signing the UN Convention against Transnational Organized Crime to prevent criminals from profiteering from COVID-19.

=== 12 October ===
The WHO Director-General rejected the concept of "herd immunity" through exposure to COVID-19 as a solution to the COVID-19 pandemic, describing it as “unethical” and “not an option”.

=== 13 October ===
In a joint statement, the Food and Agriculture Organization, International Fund for Agricultural Development, International Labour Organization (ILO), and World Health Organization called for "global solidarity and support, especially with the most vulnerable in our societies" and highlighted that tens of millions of people, especially in the developing world, risk falling into extreme poverty, with nearly half of the global 3.3 billion workforce at risk of losing their jobs.

=== 15 October ===
Releasing new statistics, the UN Children's Fund (UNICEF) estimated that 40 per cent of the global population, or circa three billion people, do not possess home hand-washing facilities, despite soap and water being vital in combating COVID-19 and other infectious diseases. The UN Economic and Social Commission for Asia and the Pacific and the ILO in a new report focusing on the pandemic highlighted that over half of the people in the Asia-Pacific region do not have any social safety net, causing ill-health, inequality, poverty, and social exclusion. The WHO announced COVID-19 has become the fifth highest cause of death in Europe, with nearly 700,000 cases being reported in the week, the highest rate since March.

=== 16 October ===
UNICEF reported that an increase in armed violence, combined with the socioeconomic impact of the COVID-19 pandemic, were contributing to the worsening plight of children in the Central Sahel, where 7.2 million in Burkina Faso, Mali and Niger needed humanitarian assistance, a significant two-thirds increase in one year.

=== 17 October ===
The UN Secretary-General, marking the International Day for the Eradication of Poverty, called for solidarity with people living in poverty during and after the COVID-19 pandemic, highlighting that “a double crisis” of the highest risk of exposure and the least access to healthcare was facing the world's poorest people, and warning that 115 million could fall into poverty in 2020, the first increase in decades.

=== 19 October ===
As COVID-19 cases continue to increase rapidly, particularly in Europe and North America, the Director-General of the WHO warned governments and people globally not to relax, and to protect those hospitalized and front-line workers.

=== 20 October ===
A new World Bank Group and UN Children's Fund (UNICEF) analysis indicated that the number of children in extreme poverty, i.e., 356 million globally before the COVID-19 pandemic began, will likely worsen significantly. The Department of Economic and Social Affairs, launching the 2020 The World’s Women: Trends and Statistics report, noted that the pandemic is stalling and/or reversing efforts to achieve gender equality.

=== 21 October ===
A new ILO report warned that the COVID-19 pandemic had resulted in "government lockdowns, collapsed consumer demand, and disrupted imports of raw materials", heavily impacting the Asia Pacific garment industry. The UN trade and development body (UNCTAD), announcing its latest update, warned that global trade was frail, with an uncertain outlook.

== Reactions and measures in Africa ==
Map of the WHO's regional offices and their respective operating regions. Africa; HQ: Brazzaville, Republic of the Congo Western Pacific; HQ: Manila, Philippines Eastern Mediterranean; HQ: Cairo, Egypt South East Asia; HQ: New Delhi, India Europe; HQ: Copenhagen, Denmark Americas; HQ: Washington, D.C., US

== Reactions and measures in the Americas ==
=== 2 October ===
United States President Donald Trump and First Lady Melania Trump test positive for COVID-19 and go into quarantine.

== Reactions and measures in Europe ==
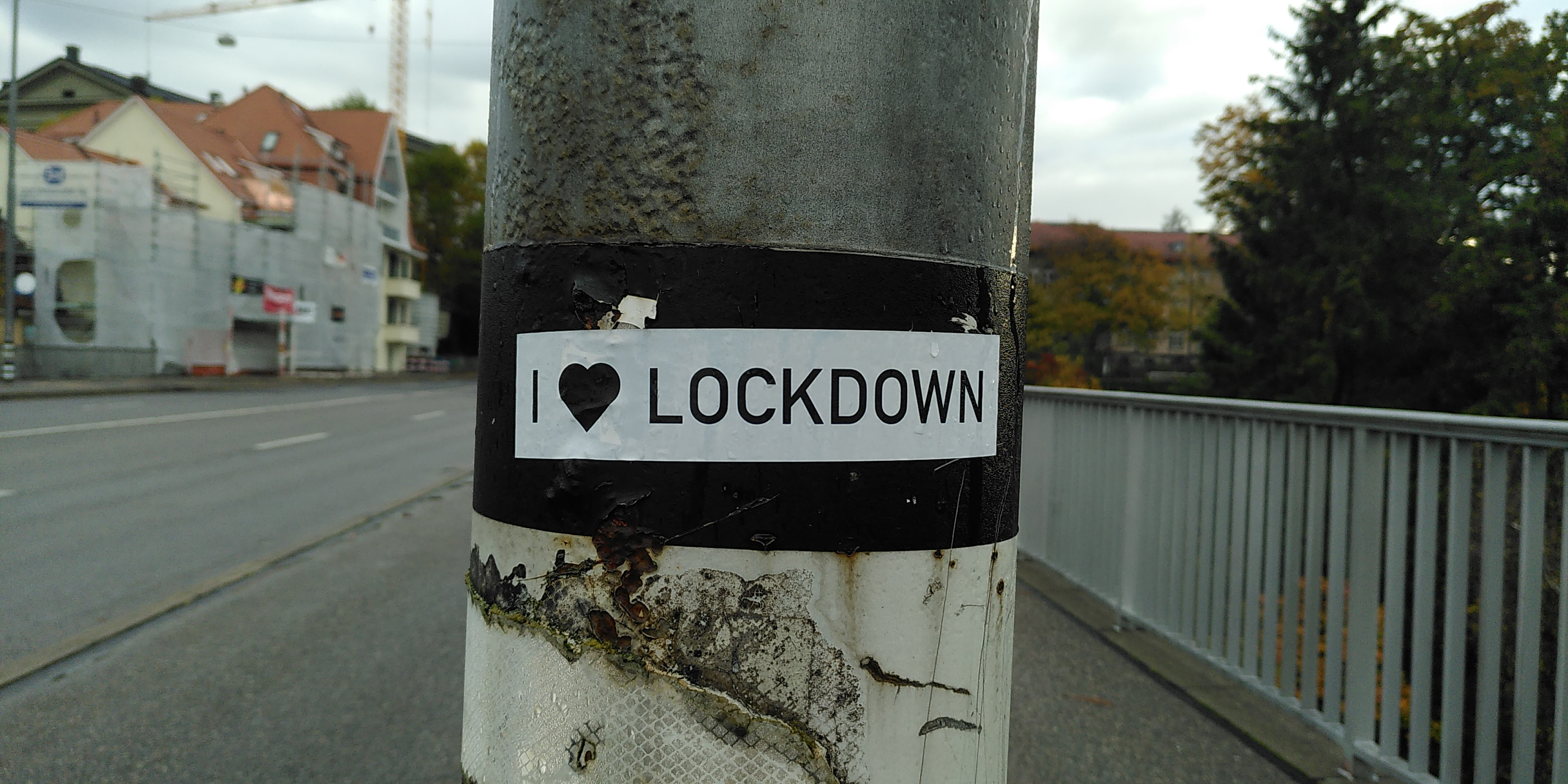

=== 25 October ===
Spain declared a national state of emergency after a surge in COVID-19 cases and imposed a countrywide curfew.

=== 28 October ===
The French Government has announced a nationwide lockdown today while the German Government has agreed to impose a four-week partial restriction period in response to a surge of cases in Europe.

=== 31 October ===
British Prime Minister Boris Johnson has announced a four-week lockdown in England after one million new cases were reported. Non-essential shops and hospitality will close for four weeks but takeaways, schools, colleges and universities will remain open.

== Reactions and measures in South and Southeast Asia ==
=== 3 October ===
Malaysian Senior Minister Ismail Sabri Yaakob has announced that the Malaysian Government would not be re-imposing lockdown measures despite a spike in cases since the majority of cases have been reported in detention centres and isolated districts.

=== 5 October ===
Malaysian Senior Minister Ismail Sabri Yaakob announced that the districts of Kota Kinabalu, Penampang, and Putatan in the state of Sabah would be placed under a Conditional Movement Control Order (MCO) commencing 7 October. Under this conditional MCO, travel and commercial activities within these districts will be limited while only essential health and food services will be allowed to operate.

=== 6 October ===
Malaysia Senior Minister Ismail Sabri Yaakob announced that the Malaysian Government would ban most travel to and from Sabah by most non-residents with the exception of those related to emergencies, deaths and essential services subject to approval from health authorities.

=== 14 October ===
The Malaysian Government places the Klang Valley in Selangor state under a Conditional Movement Control Order (CMCO), limiting inter-district movement and placing stricter controls over offices, restaurants, and shopping malls. These movement restrictions also the Federal Territories of Kuala Lumpur and Putrajaya, which lie within Selangore's boundaries.

=== 30 October ===
The Malaysian Association Of Film Exhibitors (MAFE) announced that they would be temporarily closing all cinemas in Malaysia from 2 November to help contain the spread of COVID-19 following a new wave of community transmissions throughout the month.

== Reactions and measures in the Western Pacific ==
=== 2 October ===
Australian Prime Minister Scott Morrison has announced that the Australian Government has a formalised a deal allowing New Zealanders "one-way quarantine-free travel" into New South Wales and the Northern Territory from 16 October as part of steps to establish a trans-Tasman "travel bubble" between Australia and New Zealand. New Zealand Prime Minister Jacinda Ardern however has ruled out reciprocal "quarantine-free travel" for Australians in order to keep New Zealanders safe from COVID-19.

=== 5 October ===
New Zealand Prime Minister Jacinda Ardern announced that Auckland would drop to Alert Level 1 at 11:59 pm on 7 October, bringing the region in line with the rest of the country. Under Level 1, restrictions on social gatherings are eliminated while wearing masks on public transportation will no longer be compulsory.

=== 12 October ===
The New Zealand Government signs an agreement with Pfizer and BioNTech to purchase 1.5 million COVID-19 vaccines. In addition, the Government has established a fund of $66.3 million to support a COVID-19 immunisation programme as soon as the vaccine is ready.

=== 26 October ===
In Australia, Premier of Victoria Daniel Andrews has announced the relaxation of COVID-19 lockdown restrictions. From midnight on 27 October, cafes and pubs will be allowed to reopen with a 20-person limit and public gatherings of 50 people will be allowed. However, the 25 km travel limit and border restrictions between Greater Melbourne and regional Victoria remain in force until 8 November. Lockdown restrictions in Melbourne will be progressively eased on 28 October and 8 November.

== See also ==
- Timeline of the COVID-19 pandemic
