= Timeline of the COVID-19 pandemic in Russia =

Timeline of the COVID-19 pandemic in Russia may refer to:

- Timeline of the COVID-19 pandemic in Russia (January–June 2020)
- Timeline of the COVID-19 pandemic in Russia (July–December 2020)
- Timeline of the COVID-19 pandemic in Russia (2021)
- Timeline of the COVID-19 pandemic in Russia (2022)
