= Timeline of the COVID-19 pandemic in the Republic of Ireland =

Timeline of the COVID-19 pandemic in the Republic of Ireland may refer to:

- Timeline of the COVID-19 pandemic in the Republic of Ireland (2020)
- Timeline of the COVID-19 pandemic in the Republic of Ireland (2021)
- Timeline of the COVID-19 pandemic in the Republic of Ireland (2022)
