= Timeline of the COVID-19 pandemic in India (June–December 2020) =

Sequence of major events in ongoing COVID-19 viral pandemic in India

The following is the timeline of the COVID-19 pandemic in India.

Timeline of the pandemic spread across India (since 30 January 2020 and till 3 April 2020)

Cases

Deaths

== 2020 ==
=== June ===
==== 1 June ====
204 deaths and 8,171 cases were reported. New cases were reported in the states/UTs as following:

Assam: 22 cases

Odisha: 156 cases

Delhiː 990 cases

Maharashtraː 2,361 cases

==== 2 June̝ ====
217 deaths and 8,909 cases were reported. New cases were reported in the states/UTs as following:

Andhra Pradeshː 115 cases

Tamil Naduː 1,091 cases

Keralaː 86 cases

==== 3 June̝ ====
293 deaths and 9,304 cases were reported. New cases were reported in the states/UTs as following:

Tamil Naduː 1,286 cases

Andhra Pradeshː 79 cases

Keralaː 82 cases

Maharashtraː 2,560 cases

==== 4 June ====
273 deaths and 9,851 cases were reported. New cases were reported in the states/UTs as following:

Andhara Pradesh: 98 cases

Maharashtraː 2,933 cases

Gujaratː 485 cases

Tamil Naduː 1373 cases

==== 5 June ====
294 deaths and 9,887 cases were reported. New cases were reported in the states/UTs as following:

Andhra Pradesh: 50 cases

Maharashtraː 2436 cases

Tamil Nadu: 1,438 cases

Karnataka: 515 cases

==== 6 June ====
287 deaths and 9,971 cases were reported. New cases were reported in the states/UTs as following:

Karnataka: 378 cases

Bihar: 147 cases

Andhra Pradesh: 161 cases

Maharashtraː 2,739 cases

Gujaratː 498 cases

==== 7 June ====
271 deaths and 9,983 cases were reported. New cases were reported in the states/UTs as following:

Andhra Pradesh: 130 cases

Delhi: 1,320 cases

==== 8 June ====
271 deaths and 9,983 cases were reported. New cases were reported in the states/UTs as following: New cases were reported in the states/UTs as following:

Andhra Pradesh: 125 cases

Odisha: 138 cases

Kerala: 91 cases

==== 9 June ====
274 deaths and 9985 cases were reported.

Tamil Nadu: 1,685 cases

Andhra Pradesh: 147 cases

Karnataka: 161 cases

==== 10 June ====
New cases were reported in the states/UTs as following:

Tamil Nadu: 1927 cases

Karnataka: 120 cases

Andhra Pradesh: 218 cases

==== 11 June ====
New cases were reported in the states/UTs as following:

Tamil Nadu: 1875 cases

Karnataka: 204 cases

Andhra Pradesh: 135 cases

==== 12 June ====
New cases were reported in the states/UTs as following:

Tamil Nadu: 1982 cases

Andhra Pradesh: 141 cases

==== 14 June ====
New cases were reported in the states/UTs as following:

Tamil Nadu: 1974 cases.

Karnataka: 176 cases.

Andhra Pradesh: 253 cases.

==== 15 June ====
New cases were reported in the states/UTs as following:

Kartataka: 213 cases.

Tamil Nadu: 1843 cases.

==== 16 June ====
New cases were reported in the states/UTs as following:

Tamil Nadu: 1515 cases.

Karnataka: 317 cases.

==== 17 June ====
New cases were reported in the states/UTs as following:

Tamil Nadu: 2174 cases.

West Bengal: 391 cases.

Andhra Pradesh: 275 cases.

==== 18 June ====
New cases were reported in the states/UTs as following:

Tamil Nadu: 2141 cases.

Karnataka: 210 cases.

Andhra Pradesh: 210 cases.

==== 19 June ====
New cases were reported in the states/UTs as following:

Tamil Nadu: 2115 cases.

Gujarat: 540 cases.

==== 20 June ====
New cases were reported in the states/UTs as following:

Karnataka: 416 cases.

Tamil Nadu: 2396 cases.

==== 21 June ====
New cases were reported in the states/UTs as following:

Tamil Nadu: 2352 cases.

Karnataka:453 cases.

Andhra Pradesh: 477 cases.

==== 23 June ====
New cases were reported in the states/UTs as following:

Tamil Nadu: 2516 cases.

Andhra ̪Pradesh: 462 cases.

==== 24 June ====
New cases were reported in the states/UTs as following:

Maharastra: 3890 cases.

Tamil Nadu:2865 cases.

==== 25 June ====
New cases were reported in the states/UTs as following:

Tamil Nadu: 2509 cases.

Andhra Pradesh: 553 cases.

==== 26 June ====
New cases were reported in the states/UTs as following:

Tamil Nadu: 3523 cases.

Maharashtraː 5024 cases.

==== 27 June ====
New cases were reported in the states/UTs as following:

Delhiː 2948 cases.

Tamil Naduː 3713 cases.

==== 28 June ====
New cases were reported in the states/UTs as following:

Delhiː 2889 cases.

Tamil Naduː 3940 cases.

==== 29 June ====
New cases were reported in the states/UTs as following:

Tamil Naduː 3949 cases.

==== 30 June ====
New cases were reported in the states/UTs as following:

Tamil Naduː 3943 cases.

Keralaː 131 cases.

=== July ===
==== 1 July ====
New cases were reported in the states/UTs as following:

Tamil Nadu: 3882 cases

Uttar Pradesh: 564 cases

==== 2 July ====
New cases were reported in the states/UTs as following:

Tamil Nadu: 4343 cases.

Punjab: 120 cases.

==== 3 July ====
New cases were reported in the states/UTs as following:

Tamil Nadu: 4329 cases.

Kerala: 211 cases.

==== 4 July ====
New cases were reported in the states/UTs as following:

Delhi: 2505 cases.

Tamil Nadu: 4280 cases.

==== 5 July ====
New cases were reported in the states/UTs as following:

Delhi: 2244 cases.

Andhra Pradesh: 2244 cases.

==== 6 July ====
New cases were reported in the states/UTs as following:

Maharashtra: 5368 cases.

Tamil Nadu: 3827 cases.

==== 7 July ====
New cases were reported in the states/UTs as following:

Uttar Pradesh: 1346 cases.

Maharashtra: 5134 cases.

==== 8 July ====
New cases were reported in the states/UTs as following:

Kerala: 301 cases.

Tamil Nadu: 3756 cases.

==== 9 July ====
New cases were reported in the states/UTs as following:

Andhra Pradesh: 155 cases.

Delhi: 2187 cases.

==== 10 July ====
New cases were reported in the states/UTs as following:

Tamil Nadu: 3680 cases.

Andhra Pradesh: 1608 cases.

==== 11 July ====
New cases were reported in the states/UTs as following:

Tamil Nadu: 3965 cases.

Andhra Pradesh: 1813 cases.

==== 12 July ====
New cases were reported in the states/UTs as following:

Tamil Nadu: 4244 cases.

Delhi: 1574 cases.

==== 13 July ====
New cases were reported in the states/UTs as following:

Uttar Pradesh: 1644 cases.

Tamil Nadu: 4328 cases.

==== 15 July ====
New cases were reported in the states/UTs as following:

Kerala: 623 cases.

Andhra Pradesh: 2432 cases.

==== 16 July ====
New cases were reported in the states/UTs as following:

Maharashtra: 8641 cases.

Karnataka: 4169 cases.

==== 17 July ====
New cases were reported in the states/UTs as following:

Maharashtra: 8308 cases.

Karnataka: 3693 cases.

==== 18 July ====
New cases were reported in the states/UTs as following:

Delhi: 1475 cases.

Tamil Nadu: 4807 cases.

==== 19 July ====
New cases were reported in the states/UTs as following:

Delhi: 1211 cases.

==== 20 July ====
New cases were reported in the states/UTs as following:

Andhra Pradesh: 4074 cases.

Kerala: 794 cases.

==== 21 July ====
New cases were reported in the states/UTs as following:

Delhi: 1349 cases.

Tamil Nadu: 4965 cases.

==== 22 July ====
New cases were reported in the states/UTs as following:

Maharashtra: 10576 cases.

==== 23 July ====
New cases were reported in the states/UTs as following:

Maharashtra: 9895 cases.

==== 24 July ====
New cases were reported in the states/UTs as following:

Tamil Nadu: 6785 cases.

==== 25 July ====
New cases were reported in the states/UTs as following:

Delhi: 1142 cases.

Tamil Nadu: 6988 cases.

==== 26 July ====
New cases were reported in the states/UTs as following:

Rajasthan: 1120 cases.

==== 27 July ====
New cases were reported in the states/UTs as following:

Maharashtra: 7924 cases.

==== 28 July ====
New cases were reported in the states/UTs as following:

Maharashtra: 7717 cases.

==== 29 July ====
New cases were reported in the states/UTs as following:

Tamil Nadu: 6426 cases.

==== 30 July ====
New cases were reported in the states/UTs as following:

Andhra Pradesh: 10167 cases.

==== 31 July ====
New cases were reported in the states/UTs as following:

Maharashtra: 10167 cases.

=== August ===
==== 1 August ====
Kerala: 1129 cases. Tamil Nadu: 5879 cases.

==== 2 August ====
Maharashtra: 9509 cases.

==== 8 August ====
Indian Medical Association says nearly 198 doctors died due to COVID.
