= Timeline of the COVID-19 pandemic in Malaysia =

Timeline of the COVID-19 pandemic in Malaysia may refer to:

- Timeline of the COVID-19 pandemic in Malaysia (2020)
- Timeline of the COVID-19 pandemic in Malaysia (2021)
- Timeline of the COVID-19 pandemic in Malaysia (2022)
- Timeline of the COVID-19 pandemic in Malaysia (2023)
- Timeline of the COVID-19 pandemic in Malaysia (2024)
