= 2020 Tablighi Jamaat COVID-19 hotspot in Malaysia =

COVID-19 super-spreader event in Kuala Lumpur

- Date: 27 February–1 March 2020
- Venue: Masjid Jamek Sri Petaling
- Location: Kuala Lumpur, Malaysia
- Type: Religious congregation
- Participants: At least 16,000 people (MOH estimation); 12,500 people only (Leaders of the Sri Petaling tabligh group claim)
- Outcome: Biggest cluster during the second wave of COVID-19 in Malaysia with 3,375 positive cases
- Deaths: 34

A Tablighi Jamaat religious conference held at the "Masjid Jamek Sri Petaling" in Kuala Lumpur's Sri Petaling district from 27 February to 1 March 2020 became a COVID-19 super-spreader event, with more than 3,300 cases linked to it. By 19 May 2020, the Malaysian Director-General of Health, Noor Hisham Abdullah, confirmed that 48% of the country's COVID-19 cases (3,347) had been linked to the Kuala Lumpur Tablighi Jamaat cluster. Additionally, nearly 10% of attendees were overseas visitors, which contributed to the spread of COVID-19 to other countries in Southeast Asia. On 8 July 2020, the Ministry of Health declared this cluster officially over.

Although much more widespread, the Tabligh event was not the first wave of coronavirus in Malaysia.

== Event ==
Between 27 February and 1 March 2020, the Tablighi Jamaat movement organized an international conference at the "Masjid Jamek Sri Petaling" in Sri Petaling, Kuala Lumpur, Malaysia. The religious gathering attracted approximately 16,000 attendees (though Sri Petaling Tabligh group leaders claimed only 12,500 attended), including about 1,500 from outside Malaysia. Attendees shared food, sat close together, and held hands during the event. According to guests, the event leaders did not address COVID-19 precautions, though most attendees washed their hands during the gathering. Malaysian authorities faced criticism for allowing the event to proceed.

== Spread ==
The Sri Petaling Tablighi Jamaat gathering was linked to more than 620 COVID-19 cases in March 2020, making it the largest known center of transmission of the virus in Southeast Asia at that time. At least seven countries traced cases back to the Malaysia event: most of the 73 COVID-19 cases in Brunei were linked to it, as were 22 in Cambodia, 13 in Indonesia, 10 in Thailand, 5 in Singapore, 2 in the Philippines, and 2 in Vietnam.

By 13 March, the Malaysian Ministry of Health had revised the number of Malaysian Tablighi Jamaat participants from 5,000 to 14,500, which raised concerns that more positive cases might emerge. Of the 14,500 participants, 41 tested positive for COVID-19, which brought Malaysia's total case count to 238. By 17 March, the Sri Petaling event had caused the largest spike in COVID-19 cases in Malaysia, with nearly two-thirds of the 673 confirmed cases nationwide linked to it.

On 29 March, Director-General Noor Hisham Abdullah announced that the Tabligh cluster had reached its fifth generation. By 19 May, Noor Hisham confirmed that 48% of Malaysia's COVID-19 cases (3,347) had been linked to the Sri Petaling Tabligh cluster.

== Aftermath ==
The Sri Petaling Tablighi Jamaat gathering coincided with a domestic political crisis triggered by the resignation of Prime Minister Mahathir Mohamad on 24 February, which led to the collapse of the Pakatan Harapan coalition government and the resignation of Health Minister Dzulkefly Ahmad. Before the formation of a new Perikatan Nasional government under Prime Minister Muhyiddin Yassin on 1 March, the Health Ministry lacked a minister for over two weeks until Adham Baba was appointed on 10 March. During that period, the Health Ministry only advised minimizing public exposure.

In response to a rapid rise in cases, Malaysian health authorities began tracking approximately 5,000 citizens suspected of exposure to COVID-19 at the Sri Petaling Tablighi Jamaat gathering on 11 March. Many of those infected had returned to their respective states and communities, which led to a surge in community transmissions across Malaysia.

In mid-April, Adham criticized the former PH government's handling of the Sri Petaling Tabligh Jamaat cluster. In response, Dzulkefly defended the PH government's COVID-19 preparations and suggested that Prime Minister Muhyiddin, the former Home Affairs Minister, bore responsibility for the outbreak, as public gatherings like the Tabligh event fell under his portfolio.

By late 2020, a Top Glove factory became the largest COVID-19 cluster in Malaysia to date, surpassing the Tablighi Jamaat event, with over 7,000 cases reported.

=== Stigmatization ===
Reports emerged of viral infections being blamed on various communities. The spread in Indonesia was attributed to weak government regulations on Chinese workers and tourists, and to the Tablighi Jamaat for the Malaysian outbreak. Members of the Chinese community also engaged in religious and racial profiling following the spread linked to the Tablighi cluster. Additionally, Rohingyas faced accusations of spreading COVID-19.

== See also ==
- 2020 Tablighi Jamaat coronavirus hotspot in Delhi
- 2020 Tablighi Jamaat COVID-19 hotspot in Pakistan
- Timeline of the COVID-19 pandemic in Malaysia
