= Timeline of the COVID-19 pandemic in Malaysia (2020) =

Timeline of ongoing pandemic in Malaysia

The following is a timeline of the COVID-19 pandemic in Malaysia during 2020.

== Timeline ==
=== January ===
Eight Chinese nationals were quarantined at a hotel in Johor Bahru on 24 January after coming into contact with an infected person in neighbouring Singapore. Despite early reports of them testing negative for the virus, three of them were confirmed to be infected on 25 January and subsequently quarantined at the Sungai Buloh Hospital in Selangor. The Malaysian health ministry published guidelines on the virus and established designated hospitals in each of Malaysia's states to manage any positive cases. The Malaysian public were reminded by local authorities to take precautionary measures in the wake of the virus threat with those travelling to China have been advised to stay away from animal farms and markets in the country and to not eat raw or semi-cooked meats. Following several earlier suspected cases in Sabah's capital of Kota Kinabalu, all direct flights between the state with China were stopped indefinitely.

On 24 January, a two-year-old child who was suspected to have been infected was detained along with their parents. The parents refused quarantine and were detained the next day by police at Senai International Airport before returning to China. The patient including others who refused quarantine were subsequently placed under close monitoring by the local Health Ministry. On 26 January, a fourth case of the virus, unconnected to previous cases, was detected. A suspected case was also detected in the state of Kedah's island of Langkawi involving two female Chinese nationals with both victims quarantined at the Sultanah Maliha Hospital; one later confirmed positive on 29 January. With the increasing number of cases reported in neighbouring Thailand, both the state of Kedah and Penang tightened their borders by conducting stringent checks at its international entry points. A Chinese female national in Bintulu of Sarawak also suspected of having contracted the virus led to the state tightening its border and postponing direct flights to Hainan, despite a recently signed memorandum of understanding (MoU) establishing direct flights with Sarawak.

Of the total of 25 Chinese nationals in Sabah earlier suspected of having contracted the virus, most of them tested negative as of 28 January although one of them later tested positive for the virus upon reaching China. Another eight suspected cases were recorded in Sarawak on 29 January; five in Kuching and one each in Sibu, Bintulu and Miri. Of the total eight suspected cases in the state, six have tested negative. Within the same day, three additional positive cases were confirmed in West Malaysia, involving a four-year-old child quarantined at the Sultanah Maliha Hospital in Kedah, a 52-year-old man at Sultanah Aminah Hospital in Johor and a woman at Sungai Buloh Hospital in Selangor. An eighth case was reported at the Permai Hospital in Johor on the next day.

=== February ===
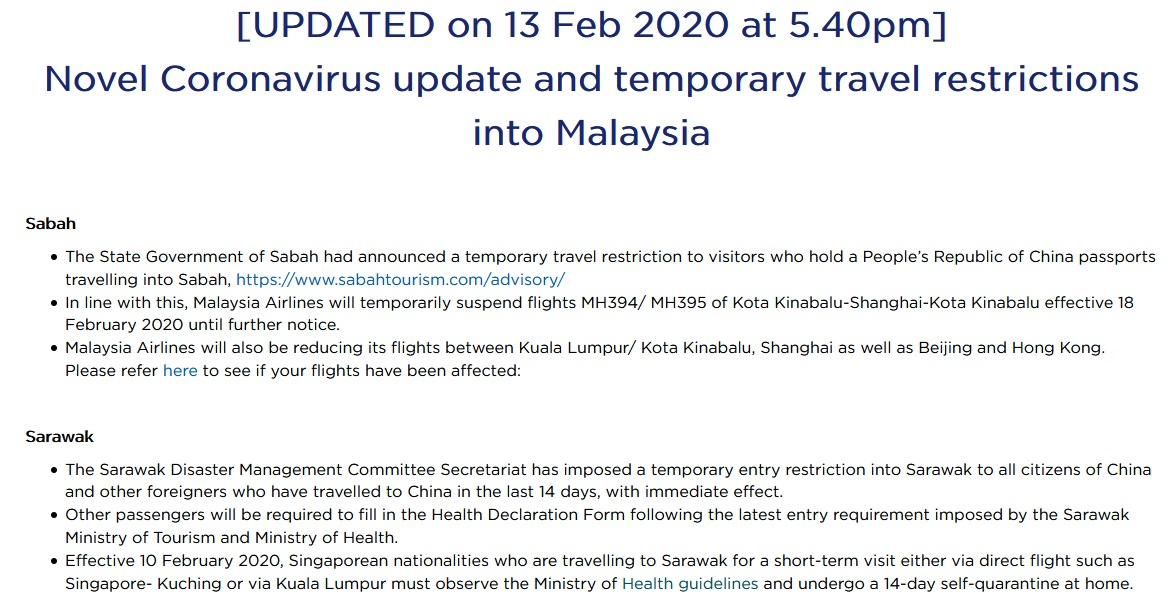
Temporary travel restrictions into Malaysia on 13 February 2020, particularly to the states of Sabah and Sarawak as released by Malaysia Airlines.

On 4 February, Malaysia reported two new cases, including a 41-year-old local male, which was the first case involving a Malaysian. The case patient had a recent trip to Singapore and is quarantined in Sungai Buloh Hospital. The other case involved a 63-year-old male from China. That same day, a Chinese girl recovered from COVID-19 and was discharged from hospital.

On 5 February, two Malaysian evacuees from Wuhan tested positive for COVID-19, bringing the total number of cases in the country to 12.

On 6 February, Malaysia reported its first local transmission, the younger sister of the 41-year-old Malaysian who tested positive for COVID-19 on 4 February. She was warded at Sultanah Bahiyah Hospital in Alor Setar. A positive case involving a 37-year-old woman from Wuhan, who had arrived in Malaysia on 25 January, was reported on the same day.

On 7 February, one new case was reported, bringing the total number to 15.

On 8 February, 11 new patients were admitted to Sibu Hospital, Miri Hospital and the Sarawak General Hospital in Kuching. The following day, the Sarawak Health Department established a hotline in response to the virus outbreak. That same day, the total number of cases reached 16. In addition, the total number of recoveries reached two.

On 9 February, one new case was reported, bringing the total number of cases to 17. One recovery was reported, bringing the total number of recoveries to three.

On 10 February, the Sarawak Disaster Management Committee prohibited entry by Singaporeans due to a major increase of positive cases in the neighbouring country. That same day, the total number of cases rose to 18. The latest case was a Malaysian citizen who had recently traveled to China.

On 13 February, one new case was reported, bringing the total number to 13. The new case was a 39-year old woman from China.

On 15 February, three new cases were reported, bringing the total number to 22. Four new recoveries were reported, bringing the total number of recoveries to seven. That same day, an elderly American woman, who was among hundreds of passengers who disembarked from the MS Westerdam cruise ship in Cambodia and flew to Kuala Lumpur in Malaysia, was identified as Malaysia's 22nd confirmed case. Meanwhile, the remaining 143 passengers, including a further six passengers from the same flight with the woman, had been declared free from the virus and were allowed to return into their respective countries.

On 16 February, one recovery was reported, bringing the total number of recoveries to eight. That same day, the Holland America Line and Cambodian health ministry requested that Malaysian health authorities re-test the US citizen to ensure the accuracy of its findings. The American woman tested positive for COVID-19 during the second test. Following this second test confirmation, the Malaysian authorities announced that the remaining passengers of the MS Westerdam would not be allowed to enter the country despite several flights being chartered by Holland America Line with Malaysia Airlines. The cruise liner's passengers had not been able to depart from Cambodia since the country did not have any direct flights to Europe and the United States. During a third check-up, the American woman tested negative for COVID-19. In response, the Cambodian government questioned the accuracy of the Malaysian authorities' testing of the American woman, while claiming there were no diplomatic tensions between Cambodia and Malaysia over the testing of the American woman. On 22 February, the Malaysian Health Ministry issued a statement that the America female patient was recovering after 72 hours of treatment.

On 17 February, one new recovery was reported, bringing the total number of recoveries to nine. The individual was the first Malaysia who had tested positive for COVID-19.

On 20 February, two new recoveries were reported, bringing the total number of COVID-19 patients in hospital down to five.

On 26 February, 20 of Malaysia's 22 positive cases had recovered. Two remained in hospital. That same day, a female Malaysian hospital worker in Sabah's Kudat District suspected of having contracted the virus was quarantined when she developed symptoms after returning from South Korea. Although she was later declared free from the virus, the Malaysian government imposed a ban on travelers from South Korea in response to the rise in positive cases within that country.

On 27 February, one new case was reported, bringing the total number to 23. Two new recoveries were reported, bringing the total number of recoveries to 22.

On 28 February, two new cases were reported, bringing the total number to 25.

=== March ===
Date	Cases		Recoveries		Deaths		Current cases			Sources
Date	New	Total	New	Total	New	Total	Active	ICU	Ventilators	Sources
1	0	29	-	-	-	-	-	-	-	
2	4	33	-	-	-	-	-	-	-	
3	7	36	22	-	-	-	14	-	-	
4	14	50	-	-	-	-	-	-	-	
5	5	55	-	-	-	-	-	-	-	
6	28	83	-	-	-	-	-	-	-	
7	10	93	-	-	-	-	-	-	-	
8	6	99	-	-	-	-	-	-	-	
9	19	118	-	-	-	-	-	-	-	
10	12	130	-	-	-	-	-	-	-	
11	10	149	-	-	-	-	-	-	-	
12	9	158	6	32	-	-	-	-	-	
13	39	200	-	-	-	-	-	-	-	
14	41	238	2	35	-	-	203	-	-	
15	190	428	7	42	-	-	-	-	-	
16	125	553	0	42	-	-	-	-	-	
17	120	673	7	49	2	2	-	-	12	
18	117	790	11	60	0	2	-	15	1	
19	110	900	-	-	0	2	-	-	-	
20	130	1,030	12	87	1	3	-	-	26	
21	153	1,183	-	-	5	8	-	-	-	
22	123	1,306	-	-	3	11	-	-	-	
23	112	1,518	-	-	3	14	-	-	-	
24	106	1,624	-	-	2	16	-	-	-	
25	172	1,796	-	-	4	20	-	45	34	
26	235	2,031	-	-	4	24	-	-	-	
27	130	2,161	-	-	2	26	-	-	-	
28	159	2,320	-	-	1	27	-	-	-	
29	150	2,470	-	-	8	35	-	-	-	
30	156	2,626	-	-	2	37	-	-	-	
31	140	2,766	58	537	6	43	-	94	60	

In March 2020, several countries in Southeast Asia recorded a significant increase in the number of COVID-19 cases as a result of a Tablighi Jamaat religious gathering held at "Masjid Jamek Sri Petaling", Sri Petaling, Kuala Lumpur, which was suspected to have infected many participants with the virus. The event, which was held from 27 February to 1 March 2020, was attended by about 12,500 participants, including about 1,500 participants from outside Malaysia. Following the surge of COVID-19 infection cases in Malaysia stemming from the Kuala Lumpur religious gathering, the Ministry of Health announced that Malaysia was in the late containment stage and that a special meeting would be held to discuss the next course of action.

We have a slim chance to break the chain of COVID-19 infections. Help the Ministry of Health (MOH) by playing your part, as every individual is responsible taking every step to protect of their family. I appeal to all Malaysians to take this movement control order seriously. Stay home and do not go out. Failure is not an option here. If we continue to maintain a "so what" attitude, we may face a third wave of this virus greater than a tsunami.

— Director-General of Health Noor Hisham Abdullah's Facebook address to Malaysians following a rise in the number of positive cases in the country, 18 March 2020.

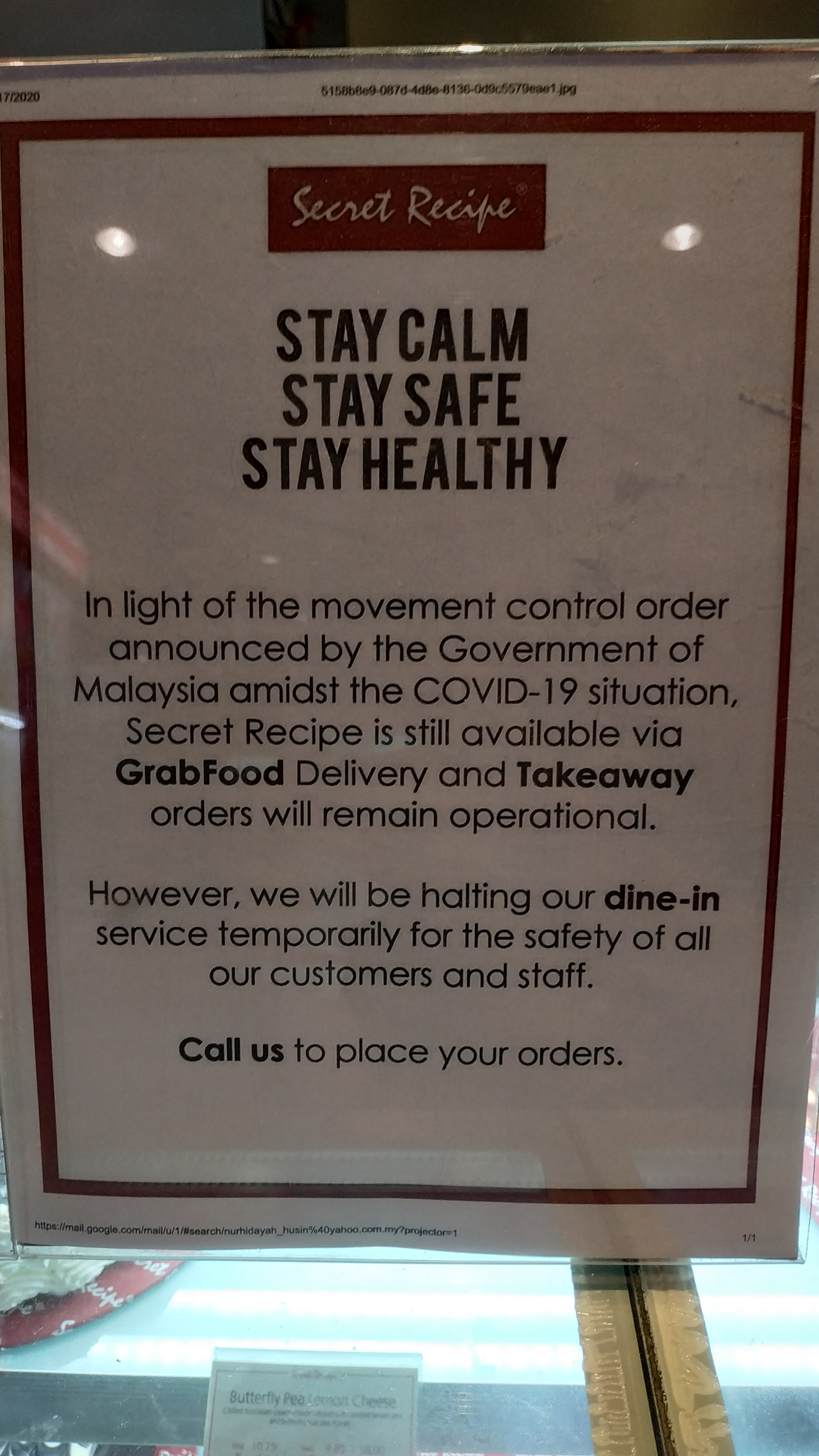
Only take-away and delivery is allowed during the movement control order as seen in this notice released by Malaysia's restaurant outlet of Secret Recipe on 18 March 2020.

On 16 March, Prime Minister Muhyiddin Yassin announced that the federal government would be imposing a nationwide lockdown known as the Movement Control Order (MCO), which would come into effect on 18 March and last for two weeks.

On 17 March, Malaysia reported its first two deaths from the coronavirus, a 60-year-old priest from Emmanuel Baptist Church in Kuching, Sarawak and a 34-year-old participant of the Muslim religious gathering in Sri Petaling from Johor Bahru, Johor.

On 18 March, the Attorney-General's Chambers (AGC) also published a federal gazette that restricted individuals from interstate travelling to other states to curb the spread of COVID-19 within the country.

On 19 March, Health Director-General Noor Hisham once again urged people to stay home, saying that Malaysia has a small chance of blocking the rapid spread of coronavirus disease as compared to the current situation facing by Italy; stating that if it misses the third wave of infection, the situation will be out of control similar to what happened in Italy. He also indicated that the Government would extend the "movement restriction order" for another 14 days. The Prime Minister also appealed to all Malaysians to adhere to the movement control in order to prevent further infections within the country.

On 20 March, it was reported that 15 medical personnel had contracted COVID-19, with one being placed in an intensive care unit (ICU). On 21 March, it was reported that a total of six Malaysian police officers had been infected by the virus while serving their duty.

On 25 March, a total of 72 Malaysia's health workers have been infected by the virus. On the same day, the government extended the movement control order until 14 April. On 26 March, the Malaysian royal household confirmed that seven officers from the nation's National Palace had been confirmed positive, which caused Malaysia's head of state, Abdullah of Pahang and his spouse to be put into quarantine, although they themselves had undergone COVID-19 tests with negative results.

=== April ===
Date	Cases		Recoveries		Deaths		Current cases			Sources
Date	New	Total	New	Total	New	Total	Active	ICU	Ventilators	Sources
1	142	2,908	108	-	2	45	-	-	-	
2	208	3,116	-	-	5	50	-	-	-	
3	217	3,333	-	-	3	53	-	3	-	
4	150	3,486	-	-	4	57	-	-	-	
5	-	-	-	-	4	61	-	-	-	
6	131	3,793	236	-	1	62	-	-	-	
7	170	3,963	80	1,321	1	63	-	-	-	
8	-	-	-	-	2	65	-	-	-	
9	109	4,228	121	-	2	67	-	72	-	
10	118	4,346	222	1,830	3	70	-	-	-	
11	184	4,530	165	1,995	3	73	-	72	38	
12	153	4,683	-	-	3	76	-	66	37	
13	134	4,817	168	2,276	1	77	-	-	-	
14	170	4,987	202	2,427	5	82	-	-	-	
15	85	5,072	169	2,647	1	83	-	-	-	
16	110	5,182	-	2766	1	84	2,332	-	-	
17	69	5,251	201	2,967	2	86	2,198	-	-	
18	54	5,305	135	3,102	2	88	2,115	49	26	
19	84	5,389	95	3,197	1	89	-	46	26	
20	36	5,425	98	3,295	0	89	2,041	45	28	
21	57	5,482	54	3,349	3	92	-	43	27	
22	50	5,532	103	3,452	1	93	1,987	43	25	
23	71	5,603	90	3,542	2	95	1,996	-	-	
24	88	5,691	121	3,663	1	96	1,932	41	18	
25	51	5,742	99	3,762	2	98	1,882	36	16	
26	38	5,870	100	3,862	0	98	-	-	-	
27	40	5,820	95	3,957	1	99	1,764	37	17	
28	31	5,851	75	4,032	1	100	1,719	36	17	
29	94	5,945	55	4,087	0	100	1,785	40	18	
30	57	6,002	84	4,171	2	102	-	-	-	

On 2 and 3 April, there was a drastic increase in daily cases in the country to above 200 cases a day. Thus, on 3 April, Director-General Noor Hisham stated the sudden spike in new cases were not the 'third wave', but largely due to active case detections on areas affected by Enhanced Movement Controlled Order, a stricter version of the MCO. On 5 April, the Director-General notified that a new cluster had been identified, which involved a person with a travel history to Italy, and now had grown as far as the third generation, with 37 positive cases and five fatalities as of the day. On 6 April two more clusters had been identified: a church gathering at Kuching which resulted in 83 cases and two fatalities and a wedding at Bandar Baru Bangi which led to 88 cases. Both clusters infected people across five generations. On 8 April, the number of cases breached the 4,000 mark with a new subcluster identified in Rembau which was linked to the religious event in Kuala Lumpur and infected 27 people across three generations.

On 10 April, the government extended the movement control order until 28 April.

By 11 April, a total of 224 healthcare workers had become infected which through investigation were found to be caused by patients with SARI symptoms, patients whose conditions were unknown before getting treatment and from on the ground screening and other activities. The death on 13 April was of a 62-year-old man who had attended the Kuala Lumpur tabligh jamaat gathering. On 14 April, the Director-General mentioned a detection of a new cluster in Sendayan, Negeri Sembilan involving a madrasa with at least 39 cases, and 28 virus clusters were detected nationwide so far.

15 April was the first date that Malaysia recorded fewer than 100 new cases since 14 March. On 18 April a new cluster had been identified among healthcare workers in three government hospitals in Sabah with 31 cases. On 19 April new cluster had been identified which consisted of 43 students returning from Temboro, Magetan, Indonesia. On 22 April a new cluster had been identified in Pengerang with 15 cases. 72 of the cases reported on 29 April came from the Magetan cluster.

At the end of April 2020, daily cases in the country had shown a decline when registering double-digit daily cases. The Director General of Health noted that the decline in cases of this infection was a result of government action implementing the Movement Control Order (MCO) nationwide.

=== May ===
Date	Cases		Recoveries		Deaths		Current cases			Sources
Date	New	Total	New	Total	New	Total	Active	ICU	Ventilators	Sources
1	69	6,071	39	4,210	1	103	1,758	37	14	
2	105	6,176	116	4,326	0	103	-	-	-	
3	122	6,297	-	-	2	105	-	27	13	
4	55	6,353	71	4,484	0	105	1,764	28	13	
5	30	6,383	83	4,567	1	106	1,710	24	8	
6	45	6,248	135	4,702	1	107	1,619	-	-	
7	39	6,467	74	4,776	0	107	1,584	19	18	
8	68	6,535	88	4,864	0	107	1,564	17	7	
9	54	6,589	65	4,929	1	108	1,552	-	-	
10	67	6,656	96	5,025	0	108	1,525	18	6	
11	70	6,726	88	5,113	1	109	1,504	20	-	
12	16	6,742	110	5,223	0	109	1,140	16	3	
13	37	6,779	58	5,281	2	111	1,387	16	4	
14	40	6,819	70	5,351	1	112	1,356	16	4	
15	36	6,855	88	5,439	0	112	1,304	14	5	
16	17	6,872	73	5,512	1	113	-	13	5	
17	22	6,894	59	5,571	0	113	1,210	13	7	
18	47	6,941	44	5,615	0	113	1,213	13	6	
19	37	6,978	31	5,646	1	114	1,218	11	6	
20	31	7,009	60	5,706	0	114	1,189	11	7	
21	50	7,050	90	5,796	0	114	1,149	10	7	
22	78	7,137	63	5,859	1	115	1,163	9	5	
23	48	7,185	53	5,912	0	115	1,158	9	5	
24	60	7,245	33	5,945	0	115	1,185	9	4	
25	172	7,417	34	5,979	0	115	1,410	-	-	
26	187	7,604	62	6,041	0	115	1,448	8	5	
27	15	7,619	42	6,083	0	115	1,421	6	4	
28	10	7,629	86	6,169	0	115	1,345	8	4	
29	103	7,732	66	6,235	0	115	1,382	8	2	
30	30	7,762	96	6,330	0	115	1,137	9	2	
31	57	7,819	23	6,353	0	115	1,351	9	2	

On 4 May, a cluster was identified at a housing area in Kuching. This was linked to the Tablighi Jamaat event in Kuala Lumpur and infected 37 people across three generations. On 7 May, a cluster was identified among security guards at a shopping mall in Cheras with nine Nepalese and a Malaysian infected. On 8 May, a cluster was identified at a factory in Pedas consisting of 60 cases. On 9 May, a cluster was identified in Setia Alam with 12 Bangladeshis testing positive. On 21 May, a cluster was detected at the Bukit Jalil Immigration Depot after 35 foreigners (17 Myanmar nationals, 15 Indian nationals, one Sri Lankan, one Bangladeshi, and one Egyptian) tested positive.

On 22 May, Prime Minister Muhyiddin Yassin also entered into quarantine for 14 days after an officer who attended the post-Cabinet meeting at the Prime Minister's Office on 21 May tested positive. On 23 May, the Director-General confirmed that a new cluster had been identified at Immigration Detention Depot in Semenyih, Selangor. 1,631 detainees and 121 staff had been tested; of whom 21 tested positive. On 25 May, Immigration Director-General Datuk Khairul Dzaimee Daud confirmed that 207 of the 13,929 illegal immigrants detained at three immigration detention centres in peninsular Malaysia had tested positive. 110 of the infected were sent to the COVID-19 quarantine and treatment centre at the Malaysia Agro Exposition Park Serdang (MAEPS). The Director-General also confirmed that a cluster of 44 cases was detected at a construction site in Kuala Lumpur. On 26 May, a surge of 173 cases was reported among foreigners detained at the Bukit Jalil immigration detention centre as well as 13 from the Cheras security guard cluster.

On 29 May, a surge in cases occurred due to the discovery of two clusters consisting of 53 cases in Pedas and 24 Bangladeshi workers who were linked to a cleaning company.

=== June ===
Date	Cases		Recoveries		Deaths		Current cases			Sources
Date	New	Total	New	Total	New	Total	Active	ICU	Ventilators	Sources
1	38	7,857	51	6,404	0	115	1,338	8	2	
2	20	7,877	66	6,470	0	115	1,292	6	2	
3	93	7,970	61	6,531	0	115	1,324	6	2	
4	277	8,247	28	6,559	0	115	1,573	6	2	
5	19	8,266	51	6,610	1	116	1,540	6	1	
6	37	8,303	25	6,645	1	117	1,551	5	0	
7	19	8,322	39	6,674	0	117	1,531	5	-	
8	7	8,329	20	6,694	0	117	1,518	6	1	
9	7	8,336	281	6,975	0	117	1,244	6	1	
10	2	8,338	39	7,014	1	118	1,206	5	0	
11	31	8,369	51	7,065	0	118	1,186	11	20	
12	33	8,402	103	7,168	1	119	1,115	4	0	
13	43	8,445	143	7,311	1	120	-	-	-	
14	8	8,453	35	7,346	1	121	-	-	-	
15	41	8,494	54	7,400	0	121	-	-	-	
16	11	8,505	333	7,733	0	121	-	-	-	
17	10	8,515	140	7,873	0	121	642	4	-	
18	14	8,529	127	8,000	0	121	408	4	0	
19	6	8,535	70	8,070	0	121	344	4	0	
20	21	8,556	76	8,146	0	121	289	3	0	
21	16	8,572	10	8,156	0	121	295	3	0	
22	15	8,587	21	8,177	0	121	289	2	0	
23	3	8,590	9	8,186	0	121	283	3	0	
24	6	8,596	45	8,231	0	121	244	-	-	
25	4	8,600	40	8,271	0	121	208	2	0	
26	6	8,606	23	8,294	0	121	200	2	0	
27	10	8,616	14	8,307	0	121	187	2	0	
28	18	8,634	10	8,318	0	121	195	2	0	
29	3	8,637	16	8,334	0	121	182	-	-	
30	2	8,639	20	8,354	0	121	164	-	-	

On 3 June, a surge of cases was reported among foreigners, 55 of them were from the Bukit Jalil detention centre and 36 were from the Pedas cluster.

On 6 June, the Director-General encouraged people to wear face masks in response to a new directive from the World Health Organization, which found that face masks helped to reduce infections.

On 15 June, there were 32 community transmissions involving foreigners including 14 from the Akademi Imigresen Malaysia in Port Dickson, 15 from the Pedas cluster in Negri Sembilan, and two from the cleaning services company cluster.

As of 18 June, 13,149 individuals have been tested, with 782 testing positive, 11,564 negative, and 803 awaiting results. Out of the 782 positive cases, seven are Malaysians and 775 are foreigners.

On 19 June, the Director-General confirmed that a new cluster consisting of six cases had been detected in Kidurong, Sarawak. The index case was a university student who had tested positive for COVID-19 on 12 June. Contact tracing identified 231 people who had been contact with the patient, 163 of whom had tested negative for the virus.

On 20 June, the Director-General confirmed the discovery of a new cluster in Labu Lanjut, Sepang.

On 23 June, the Director-General announced the closure of the Kuching Church Conference cluster, which had caused three deaths and 191 infections since it was first discovered on 15 March 2020.

On 24 June, three new clusters were identified at a Hulu Langat condominium, a Bukit Bintang cluster, and a Kuching construction site.

On 27 June, the Director-General confirmed that 61,576 Malaysians have returned from overseas with 610 testing positive for COVID-19 as of 25 June. All returnees are subject to a 14 quarantine period.

=== July ===
Date	Cases		Recoveries		Deaths		Current cases			Sources
Date	New	Total	New	Total	New	Total	Active	ICU	Ventilators	Sources
1	1	8,640	21	8,375	0	121	144	-	-	
2	3	8,643	62	8,437	0	121	85	-	-	
3	5	8,648	9	8,446	0	121	81	-	-	
4	10	8,658	15	8,461	0	121	76	-	2	
5	5	8,663	4	8,465	0	121	77	-	-	
6	5	8,668	11	8,476	0	121	71	-	-	
7	5	8,674	5	8,481	0	121	72	-	-	
8	3	8,677	5	8,486	0	121	70	-	-	
9	6	8,683	13	8,499	0	121	63	2	1	
10	13	8,696	12	8,511	0	121	64	-	-	
11	8	8,704	4	8,515	1	122	67	3	2	
12	14	8,718	4	-	0	122	-	-	-	
13	7	8,725	1	8,520	0	122	83	4	3	
14	4	8,720	4	8,524	0	122	83	4	2	
15	5	8,734	2	8,526	0	122	86	5	-	
16	3	8,737	12	8,538	0	122	77	3	1	
17	18	8,755	3	8,541	0	122	92	3	1	
18	9	8,764	5	8,546	0	122	96	1	-	
19	15	8,779	7	8,553	1	123	103	2	1	
20	21	8,800	2	8,555	0	123	122	3	1	
21	15	8,815	7	8,562	0	123	130	4	1	
22	16	8,831	4	-	0	123	-	5	1	
23	9	8,840	8	8,574	0	123	143	5	2	
24	21	8,861	3	8,577	0	123	161	5	2	
25	23	8,884	17	8,594	0	123	167	3	2	
26	13	8,897	6	8,600	1	124	-	-	-	
27	7	8,904	1	8,601	0	124	179	-	-	
28	39	8,943	6	8,607	0	124	212	-	-	
29	13	8,956	10	8,612	0	124	220	-	-	
30	8	8,964	5	8,617	0	124	-	-	-	
31	12	8,976	27	8,644	1	125	207	3	1	

On 17 July, the Director-General confirmed that four new clusters had been identified including a Malaysian who had returned from Nigeria, a foreigner from a professional group that had visited Malaysia, a frontliner who was admitted to the Sarawak General Hospital, and a ship crew member with a history of travel to Japan and Singapore.

On 18 July, the Health Ministry confirmed the discovery of a new cluster in Stutong, Sarawak. The Government has also screened 218 petty traders including 213 Malaysians and five foreigners.

On 24 July, the Director-General also identified three new clusters: the Elsa cluster, PUI Ramnad and PUI Al Khobar.

On 25 July, the Director-General identified two new clusters in Bukit Tiram and at a Kuching construction company.

On 30 July, the Director-General announced the closure of the Bukit Bintang cluster and urged people to follow standard operating procedures (SOPs) during the Hari Raya Aidiladha celebrations held the following day.

=== August ===
Date	Cases		Recoveries		Deaths		Current cases			Sources
Date	New	Total	New	Total	New	Total	Active	ICU	Ventilators	Sources
1	9	8,985	3	8,647	0	125	213	2	1	
2	14	8,999	17	8,664	0	125	-	-	-	
3	2	9,001	4	8,670	0	125	208	-	-	
4	1	9,002	14	8,684	0	125	193	-	-	
5	21	9,023	18	8,702	0	125	-	-	-	
6	15	9,038	11	8,713	0	125	200	2	1	
7	25	9,063	15	8,728	0	125	-	-	-	
8	7	9,070	47	8,775	0	125	170	2	1	
9	13	9,083	9	8,784	0	125	-	-	-	
10	11	9,094	19	8,803	0	125	-	-	-	
11	9	9,103	6	8,809	0	125	-	-	-	
12	11	9,114	8	-	0	125	-	-	-	
13	15	9,129	4	8,821	0	125	183	2	0	
14	20	9,149	7	8,828	0	125	196	4	1	
15	26	9,715	3	-	0	125	219	-	-	
16	25	9,200	28	8,859	0	125	216	-	-	
17	12	9,212	17	8,876	0	125	211	-	-	
18	7	9,219	26	8,902	0	192	-	-	125	
19	16	9,235	23	8,925	0	125	185	-	-	
20	5	9,240	7	8,932	0	125	183	-	-	
21	9	13	0	179	-	-	125	8,945	9,249	
22	8	4	0	183	8	4	125	8,949	9,257	
23	10	9,267	10	8,959	0	125	183	9	2	
24	7	9,274	6	8,965	0	126	184	8	5	
25	11	9,285	6	8,971	0	125	189	8	6	
26	6	9,291	7	8,978	0	125	188	9	6	
27	5	9,296	16	8,994	0	125	177	8	6	
28	10	9,306	36	9,030	0	125	151	8	6	
29	11	9,317	8	9,038	0	125	154	8	6	
30	17	9,334	10	9,048	1	126	160	7	5	
31	6	9,340	6	9,054	1	127	159	6	4	

On 3 August, four sub-district in Kubang Pasu, Kedah was placed under an "Enhanced Movement Control Order" due to the increased number of cases there following two village in Sanglang, Perlis and a Surau in Shah Alam, Selangor five days later.

On 16 August, Malaysian Director-General of Health Noor Hisham Abdullah confirmed that the Malaysian Institute for Medical Research had detected the D614G type mutation after testing three cases from the Sivagangga Cluster and one case from the Ulu Tiram Cluster. This mutation, more infectious than the D614 type, is now the dominant form of the COVID-19 virus in the pandemic.

On 18 August, four of the new locally transmitted cases were connected to clusters in Tawar and Sala in Kedah.

On 20 August, the authorities designated a new cluster at Bintulu port called "Alam", which was linked to an oil tanker.

On 25 August, the Director-General reported that five of the new cases were linked to the Tawar cluster in Kedah, bringing the total in that cluster to 70.

On 30 August, one death was reported, bringing the death toll to 126. The patient was a 75-year-old man with a history of chronic illnesses. This is the first COVID-19 death in Malaysia in August 2020 since the last reported death on 31 July.

=== September ===
Date	Cases		Recoveries		Deaths		Current cases			Sources
Date	New	Total	New	Total	New	Total	Active	ICU	Ventilators	Sources
1	14	9,354	21	9,075	1	128	151	5	3	
2	6	9,360	4	9,079	0	128	153	4	3	
3	14	9,374	4	9,083	0	128	163	4	3	
4	11	9,385	9	9,092	0	128	165	4	3	
5	6	9,391	21	9,113	0	128	150	5	3	
6	6	9,397	2	9,115	0	128	154	6	3	
7	62	9,459	9	9,124	0	128	207	6	4	
8	100	9,559	12	9,136	0	128	295	7	4	
9	24	9,583	7	9,143	0	128	312	7	4	
10	45	9,628	24	9,167	0	128	333	9	5	
11	182	9,810	14	9,181	0	128	501	9	5	
12	58	9,868	8	9,189	0	128	551	9	5	
13	47	9,915	7	9,196	0	128	591	9	4	
14	31	9,946	7	9,203	0	128	615	11	5	
15	23	9,969	6	9,209	0	128	632	14	4	
16	62	10,031	26	9,235	0	128	668	15	3	
17	21	10,052	15	9,252	0	128	674	13	2	
18	95	10,147	14	9,264	1	129	754	11	2	
19	20	10,167	51	9,315	1	130	722	12	2	
20	52	10,219	40	9,355	0	130	734	10	2	
21	57	10,276	40	9,395	0	130	751	9	2	
22	82	10,358	168	9,563	0	130	665	9	2	
23	147	10,505	39	9,602	3	133	770	8	2	
24	71	10,576	64	9,666	0	133	777	6	2	
25	111	10,685	30	9,696	0	133	858	4	3	
26	82	10,769	89	9,785	0	133	851	8	4	
27	150	10,919	50	9,835	1	134	950	6	4	
28	115	11,034	54	9,889	0	134	1,011	8	5	
29	101	11,135	50	9,939	0	134	1,062	13	5	
30	89	11,124	28	9,967	2	136	1,124	16	3	

On 7 September, the Director-General confirmed that 50 of the newly reported community transmissions were linked to the Benteng Lahad Datu police headquarters cluster and Tawau prison in Sabah. The Director-General also announced the new Sungai cluster in the state of Kedah.

On 8 September, the Director-General confirmed that 62 of the cases came from the Benteng Lahad Datu cluster while 23 came from the Sungai cluster in Kedah.

On 10 September, 40 new cases were linked to the Benteng Lahad Datu cluster. On 11 September 167 new cases were reported in the Benteng Lahad Datu cluster, bringing the total number of cases in that cluster to 337, making it the biggest current cluster in Malaysia.

On 19 September, the Director-General identified a new COVID-19 cluster in Semporna, Sabah. The index case was a Filipino woman (case 10,145), who was the 129th fatal case. A total of 109 people have been screened, with 106 awaiting test results.

On 23 September, a spike of 147 cases was reported, with 134 of these occurring in Sabah. The Director-General also identified a new cluster in Udin, Sabah. On 24 September, 63 of the new cases occurred in Sabah, with 47 being linked to the Bangau-bangau cluster in Semporna and the Laut cluster in Kunak.

On 27 September, the Director-General identified three new clusters at Buang Sayang in Sipitang, Sabah; Kg Sakong in Semperna, Sabah; and Setapak in Kuala Lumpur.

On 29 September, the Director-General identified four new clusters: the Jalan Bomba and Jalan Utara clusters in Sabah, the Benteng Pk cluster in Selangor, and the Bakawali cluster in Johor.

=== October ===
Date	Cases		Recoveries		Deaths		Current cases			Sources
Date	New	Total	New	Total	New	Total	Active	ICU	Ventilators	Sources
1	260	11,484	47	10,014	0	136	1,334	20	3	
2	287	11,771	81	10,095	0	136	1,540	22	4	
3	317	12,088	121	10,216	1	137	1,735	29	4	
4	293	12,381	67	10,283	0	137	1,961	28	4	
5	432	12,813	57	10,340	0	137	2,336	32	8	
6	691	13,504	87	10,427	4	141	2,936	31	8	
7	489	13,993	74	10,501	0	141	3,351	40	13	
8	375	14,368	18	10,519	6	146	3,703	60	20	
9	354	14,722	188	10,707	6	152	3,863	68	25	
10	374	15,096	73	10,780	3	155	4,161	73	28	
11	561	15,657	133	10,913	2	157	4,587	90	29	
12	563	16,220	109	11,022	2	159	5,039	98	29	
13	660	16,880	350	11,372	4	163	5,345	101	32	
14	660	17,540	233	11,605	4	167	5,768	108	35	
15	589	18,129	409	12,014	3	170	5,419	103	31	
16	629	18,758	245	12,259	6	176	6,323	99	31	
17	869	19,627	302	12,561	4	180	6,886	91	30	
18	871	20,498	701	13,262	7	187	7,049	86	28	
19	865	21,363	455	13,717	3	190	7,436	99	32	
20	862	22,225	634	14,351	3	193	7,681	95	29	
21	732	22,957	580	14,391	6	199	7,827	102	31	
22	847	23,804	486	15,417	5	204	8,183	90	29	
23	710	24,514	467	15,884	10	214	8,416	90	28	
24	1,228	25,742	671	16,555	7	221	8,966	92	31	
25	823	26,565	579	17,134	8	229	9,202	99	30	
26	1,240	27,805	691	17,825	7	236	9,744	94	31	
27	835	28,640	674	18,499	2	238	9,903	89	32	
28	801	29,441	573	19,072	8	246	10,123	94	25	
29	649	30,090	685	19,757	0	246	10,087	106	23	
30	799	30,889	491	20,248	3	249	10,392	90	20	
31	659	31,548	1,000	21,248	0	249	10,051	83	19	

On 1 October, the Director-General Noor Hisham Abdullah confirmed that 118 of the 260 new cases reported that day had occurred in Sabah while 31 cases reported in other Malaysian states were linked to travel in Sabah. The Health Ministry also identified four new clusters: the Bah Ketil cluster in Kedah, the Joo Hwa cluster in Sabah, and the Selasih cluster in Putrajaya.

On 3 October, the Director-General identified three new clusters: two in Kedah and one in Sabah.

On 5 October, Malaysia recorded 432 new cases, the highest daily increase since the pandemic hit the country. Kedah and Sabah recorded the highest number of new cases that day, 241 and 130 respectively. Zulkifli Mohamad Al-Bakri, the Minister in the Prime Minister's Department in charge of religious affairs, tested positive for COVID-19 that day.

On 7 October 489 were reported, with 282 coming from Sabah and 153 from Kedah. Most of these cases came from the red zones in Sabah and Kedah's Tembok cluster. On 8 October, the Health Ministry identified five new clusters: the Tujuh Serangkai and Tanamera clusters in Sabah, Jalan Pantai Cluster in Kuala Lumpur, Bah Arnab Cluster in Sarawak, and Bah Bangat Cluster in Labuan.

On 17 October, the Director General Noor Hisham identified five new clusters: Teduh in Sabah's Lahad Datu district, Menara in Selangor, Keladi in Selangor's Klang District, the Sentral cluster in Kuala Lumpur, and the Bah Bemban cluster involving Dungun, Terengganu and Kota Kinabalu in Sabah.

On 23 October, the Director General Noor Hisham identified three new clusters: the Samudera cluster in Sandakan, Sabah; the Palma cluster in Gombak, Hulu Selangor and Kepong, Kuala Lumpur; and the Jaya cluster at Sepang in Selangor, and Seremban in Negri Sembilan.

On 24 October, Malaysian health authorities recorded a record 1,228 cases, the highest number of cases to date. Of this figure, 889 cases were reported in Sabah, the site of the "third wave" of outbreaks.

On 25 October, the Ministry of Health identified nine new clusters: four in Sabah and one each in Selangor, Penang, Sarawak, Johor and Negeri Sembilan.

=== November ===
Date	Cases		Recoveries		Deaths		Current cases			Sources
Date	New	Total	New	Total	New	Total	Active	ICU	Ventilators	Sources
1	957	32,505	972	22,220	0	249	10,036	97	27	
2	834	33,339	900	23,129	2	9,968	91	32	251	
3	1,054	34,393	875	23,995	12	263	10,135	94	32	
4	1,032	35,425	820	24,815	8	271	10,339	82	27	
5	1,009	36,434	839	25,654	6	277	10,503	78	28	
6	1,755	38,189	726	26,380	2	279	11,530	83	32	
7	1,168	39,357	1,029	27,409	3	282	11,666	87	32	
8	852	40,209	825	28,234	4	286	11,689	94	32	
9	972	41,181	1,345	29,579	8	294	11,308	86	31	
10	869	42,050	725	30,304	6	300	11,446	82	27	
11	822	42,872	769	31,073	2	302	11,497	86	30	
12	919	43,791	996	32,069	1	303	11,419	92	35	
13	1,304	45,095	900	32,969	1	304	11,822	96	39	
14	1,114	46,209	803	33,772	2	306	12,131	103	43	
15	1,208	47,417	1,013	34,785	3	309	12,323	104	42	
16	1,103	48,520	821	35,606	4	313	12,601	102	39	
17	1,210	49,730	1,018	36,624	5	318	12,788	105	40	
18	660	50,390	630	37,254	4	322	12,814	103	41	
19	1,290	51,680	878	38,132	4	326	13,222	110	37	
20	958	52,638	956	39,088	3	329	13,221	110	42	
21	1,041	53,679	1,405	40,493	3	332	12,854	108	45	
22	1,096	54,775	1,104	41,597	3	335	12,843	106	46	
23	1,884	56,659	883	42,480	2	337	13,842	115	48	
24	2,188	58,847	1,673	44,153	4	341	14,353	112	49	
25	970	59,817	2,348	46,501	4	345	12,971	110	47	
26	935	60,752	2,555	49,056	3	348	11,348	110	45	
27	1,109	61,861	1,148	50,204	2	350	11,307	113	41	
28	1,315	63,716	1,110	51,314	4	354	11,508	118	43	
29	1,309	64,485	1,333	52,647	3	347	11,481	116	42	
30	1,212	65,697	2,112	54,759	3	360	10,578	113	42	

On 1 November, the Director-General identified two new clusters: the Usaha cluster in the Klang Valley and the Tembaga cluster in Penang.

On 6 November, the Director General reported that 1,199 of the 1,755 cases reported that date occurred in Sabah, marking the first time that the state has recorded new four digit figures in a single day and the highest number of new positive cases in the state so far.

On 11 November, the Director-General identified three new clusters in Sabah: the Karamunting cluster, Saga cluster and Haven cluster.

On 15 November, the Klang Valley including Kuala Lumpur reported a spike of 661 cases with the Damanlela Construction Site cluster in Kuala Lumpur recording 460 cases.

On 19 November, the Director General announced that over 9,000 of the country's COVID-19 cases were detected through the MySejahtera contact tracing app launched on 20 April.

On 16 November 2020, several COVID-19 cases were detected in one of the Top Glove dormitories in Klang which has led to an enhanced movement control order being implemented in the surrounding area between 17 November and 30 November. By 27 November 2020, more than 4000 cases were linked to the Top Glove dormitories cluster. On 30 November, the EMCO at Top Glove's dormitories throughout the country was extended until 14 December.

=== December ===
Date	Cases		Recoveries		Deaths		Current cases			Sources
Date	New	Total	New	Total	New	Total	Active	ICU	Ventilators	Sources
1	1,472	67,169	1,552	56,311	3	363	10,495	120	44	
2	851	68,020	658	56,969	2	365	10,686	122	47	
3	1,075	69,095	948	57,917	11	376	10,802	116	46	
4	1,141	70,236	1,144	59,062	0	376	10,799	129	53	
5	1,123	71,359	1,143	60,204	4	380	10,775	130	54	
6	1,135	72,694	1,069	61,273	2	382	11,039	125	57	
7	1,600	74,294	1,033	62,306	2	384	11,604	129	57	
8	1,012	75,306	1,750	64,056	4	388	10,862	126	62	
9	959	76,265	1,068	65,124	5	393	10,748	127	61	
10	2,234	78,499	1,112	66,236	3	396	11,867	124	60	
11	1,810	80,309	937	67,173	6	402	12,734	123	63	
12	1,937	82,246	911	68,084	9	411	13,751	121	66	
13	1,229	83,457	1,309	69,393	4	415	13,667	115	65	
14	1,371	84,846	1,204	70,597	4	419	13,830	114	62	
15	1,772	86,618	1,084	71,161	3	422	14,515	118	56	
16	1,295	87,913	1,052	72,733	7	429	14,751	113	53	
17	1,220	89,133	1,297	74,030	3	432	14,671	106	53	
18	1,683	90,816	1,214	75,244	0	432	15,140	106	51	
19	1,153	91,969	998	76,242	1	433	15,294	112	56	
20	1,340	93,309	1,067	77,309	4	437	15,563	116	57	
21	2,018	95,327	1,084	78,393	1	438	16,496	109	55	
22	2,062	97,389	911	79,304	1	439	17,646	111	51	
23	1,348	98,737	710	80,014	5	444	18,279	102	44	
24	1,581	100,318	1,085	81,099	2	446	18,773	102	45	
25	1,247	101,565	1,441	82,540	3	449	18,576	108	47	
26	2,335	103,900	874	83,414	2	451	20,035	108	50	
27	1,196	105,096	997	84,411	1	452	20,233	111	50	
28	1,594	106,690	1,181	85,592	3	455	20,643	116	53	
29	1,925	108,615	1,123	86,715	2	457	21,443	117	55	
30	1,870	110,485	745	87,460	6	463	22,562	131	62	
31	2,525	113,010	1,481	88,941	8	471	23,598	131	60	

On 1 December, a total of 778 cases came from the Teratai cluster in Selangor, which was linked to an outbreak among foreign workers at Top Glove factories in the Klang District, Kuala Selangor, and Kepong.

On 4 December, the total number of cases exceeded the 70,000 mark.

On 10 December, Malaysia reported a new record of 2,234 new cases. The following day, Malaysia reached the 80,000 mark while the death toll reached 402.

On 16 December, Malaysia surpassed China's case numbers. On 18 December, the total number of cases in Malaysia exceeded the 90,000 mark.

On 21 December, Panasonic Malaysia confirmed that 116 employees at its two manufacturing facilities in Shah Alam, Selangor had tested positive for COVID-19.

On 22 December, Noor Hisham reported eight new clusters: the Bukit Naga and Pasadena Babu clusters in Selangor; the Tapak Bina Resident cluster and two other clusters in Kuala Lumpur; the Tampoi Jaya cluster in Johor; the Rapat cluster in Perak; and the Paginatan cluster in Sabah.

By 23 December, the number of recoveries in Malaysia had exceeded 80,000. That same day, the Malaysian Health Ministry confirmed that it had identified a new COVID-19 strain dubbed the "A701B" strain, which is similar to a strain found in South Africa, Australia, and the Netherlands. On 24 December, Malaysia exceeded more than 100,000 COVID-19 cases.

On 26 December, a record number of 2,335 new cases were confirmed that day.

On 30 December, Johor recorded the highest number of cases since the COVID-19 outbreak with a total of 607 cases, with 374 of them coming from the Tembok Choh prison cluster.
