= Timeline of the COVID-19 pandemic in Malaysia (2021) =

Timeline of ongoing pandemic in Malaysia

The following is a timeline of the COVID-19 pandemic in Malaysia during 2021.

== Timeline ==
=== January ===
Date	Cases		Recoveries		Deaths		Current cases			Sources
Date	New	Total	New	Total	New	Total	Active	ICU	Ventilators	Sources
1	2,068	115,078	2,230	91,171	3	474	23,433	126	54	
2	2,295	117,373	3,321	94,492	9	483	22,398	125	51	
3	1,704	119,077	2,726	97,218	11	494	21,365	124	51	
4	1,741	120,818	1,010	98,228	7	501	22,089	122	53	
5	2,207	122,845	1,221	99,449	8	509	22,887	123	52	
6	2,593	125,438	1,129	100,578	4	513	24,437	141	67	
7	3,027	128,465	2,145	102,273	8	521	25,221	142	63	
8	2,641	131,108	2,708	105,431	16	537	25,140	170	82	
9	2,451	133,559	1,401	106,832	5	542	26,185	177	82	
10	2,433	135,992	1,277	108,109	9	551	27,332	171	76	
11	2,232	138,224	1,006	109,115	4	555	28,554	187	87	
12	3,309	141,533	1,469	110,584	4	559	30,390	190	83	
13	2,985	144,518	994	111,578	4	563	32,377	197	79	
14	3,337	147,855	1,710	113,288	15	578	33,989	195	86	
15	3,211	151,066	1,939	115,227	8	586	35,253	204	87	
16	4,029	155,095	2,148	117,375	8	594	37,126	205	79	
17	3,339	158,434	2,676	120,051	7	601	37,782	240	93	
18	3,306	161,740	2,293	122,344	4	605	38,791	226	94	
19	3,631	165,371	2,944	125,288	14	619	39,464	238	96	
20	4,008	169,379	2,374	127,662	11	630	41,087	246	96	
21	3,170	172,549	2,490	130,152	12	642	41,755	260	103	
22	3,631	176,180	2,554	132,706	18	660	42,814	251	102	
23	4,275	180,455	4,313	137,019	7	667	42,769	260	103	
24	3,346	183,801	4,427	141,446	11	678	41,677	265	102	
25	3,048	186,849	3,638	145,084	11	689	41,076	261	101	
26	3,585	190,434	4,076	149,160	11	700	40,574	280	111	
27	3,680	194,114	1,858	151,018	7	707	42,389	314	122	
28	4,094	198,208	3,281	154,299	10	717	43,192	303	118	
29	5,725	203,933	3,423	157,722	16	733	45,478	301	115	
30	5,728	209,661	3,805	161,527	13	746	47,388	319	120	
31	5,298	214,959	4,522	166,049	14	760	48,150	313	127	

On 3 January 2021, Sabah's Deputy Chief Minister II Jeffrey Kitingan tested positive for COVID-19 and underwent treatment at Queen Elizabeth Hospital in the state capital Kota Kinabalu.

By 6 January 2021, the director-general had reported there were 252 active clusters left of the total 561. He also confirmed the closure of the Kobena, Mengketil and UD SS2 clusters. That same day, the number of recoveries reached 100,578. On 7 January, a record number of 3,027 new cases were reported with Johor the highest of the day, with 1,103 new cases reported. On January 8, Malaysia recorded 16 new confirmed COVID-19 deaths, the highest number ever.

By 10 January 2021, the director-general had confirmed the identification of five new clusters: the Cyber Construction Site and Texmile clusters in Selangor, the Alo Durian and Wakaf Lanas clusters in Kelantan, and the Jalan Sibuga cluster in Sandakan, Sabah. That same day, Mustapa Mohamed, a Minister in the Prime Minister's Department (with responsibility for the economy) tested positive for COVID-19.

By 17 January 2021, the death toll had reached the 600 mark while the total number of recoveries had reached 120,051.

By 25 January, the Health Ministry reported nine new clusters: the Jalan Sebelas cluster in Hulu Langat, Selangor, the Bukit Emas cluster in Negri Sembilan, the Tapak Bina Sri Petaling cluster, the Ladang Segama and Jalan Segama clusters in Lahad Datu, Sabah, the Tapak Bina Flora cluster in the federal territory of Putrajaya, the Jalan Tengar cluster in Johor Baru, and the Tembok Taiping cluster in Perak.

=== February ===
Date	Cases		Recoveries		Deaths		Current cases			Sources
Date	New	Total	New	Total	New	Total	Active	ICU	Ventilators	Sources
1	4,214	219,173	4,280	170,329	10	770	48,074	316	137	
2	3,455	222,628	3,661	173,990	21	791	47,847	327	145	
3	4,284	226,912	3,804	177,794	18	809	48,309	307	141	
4	4,571	231,483	4,092	181,886	17	826	48,771	308	135	
5	3,391	234,874	3,392	185,278	19	845	48,751	310	134	
6	3,847	238,721	1,692	186,970	12	857	50,894	305	139	
7	3,731	242,452	3,369	190,339	15	872	51,241	292	140	
8	3,100	245,552	2,340	192,679	24	896	51,977	282	134	
9	2,764	248,316	3,887	196,566	13	909	50,841	289	127	
10	3,288	251,604	1,929	198,495	14	923	52,186	285	131	
11	3,384	254,988	3,774	202,269	13	936	51,783	259	122	
12	3,318	258,306	3,505	205,774	17	953	51,597	258	119	
13	3,499	261,805	3,515	209,289	5	958	51,558	263	118	
14	2,464	264,269	4,525	213,814	7	965	49,490	260	111	
15	2,176	266,445	4,521	218,335	10	975	47,135	260	112	
16	2,720	269,195	5,718	224,053	8	983	44,129	253	118	
17	2,998	272,163	5,709	229,762	22	1,005	41,396	231	115	
18	2,712	274,875	5,320	235,082	25	1,030	38,763	227	103	
19	2,936	277,811	4,889	239,971	13	1,043	37,797	220	104	
20	2,461	280,272	4,782	244,753	8	1,051	34,468	207	91	
21	3,297	283,569	4,456	249,202	5	1,056	33,304	209	91	
22	2,192	285,671	3,414	252,623	6	1,062	32,076	199	91	
23	2,468	288,228	4,055	256,678	14	1,076	30,475	196	92	
24	3,545	291,774	3,331	260,009	12	1,088	30,677	189	88	
25	1,924	293,698	3,752	263,761	12	1,100	28,837	205	91	
26	2,253	295,951	3,085	266,846	11	1,111	27,994	201	93	
27	2,364	298,315	3,320	270,166	10	1,121	27,028	190	99	
28	2,437	300,752	3,251	273,417	9	1,130	26,205	202	93	

On 4 February, the director-general Noor Hisham Abdullah identified ten new clusters in Selangor (3), Johor (3), Sarawak (1), Negri Sembilan (1), and Pahang (2), bringing the total number of clusters to 421.

By 7 February, Senior Minister Ismail Sabri Yaakob confirmed that 312,363 foreign workers had been screened for COVID-19 since 1 December 2020. Of those screened, 6,093 tested positive for COVID-19 while 306,530 tested negative. This screening involved 13,533 employers and 1,268 clinics.

On 16 February, the director-general identified six new clusters in Sarawak: Jalan Geronggang and Sungai Merah in Sibu; a primary school in Kidurong Dua, Biru; the Univista cluster in Samarahan; Kampung Sungai Maong in Kuching, and the Gelong cluster in Taman Sri Gelong, Kapit. That same day, the director-general said that allowing low-risk COVID-19 patients to self-isolate at home had helped to reduce the strain on hospitals. As a result, bed occupancy for COVID-19 patients at hospitals, quarantine centers, and intensive care units had dropped by 47%, 37% and 55% respectively.

On 17 February, the director-general identified 13 new clusters: five in Selangor, four in Johor, and one each in Terengganu, Negri Sembilan, Kuala Lumpur and Sarawak. Ten of these clusters are work-related clusters.

On 25 February, the director-general announced the closure of 18 clusters after no cases were linked to them for 18 days. Since the beginning of the COVID-19 pandemic, Malaysia had experienced a total of 1,111 clusters, of which 612 have ended.

=== March ===
Date	Cases		Recoveries		Deaths		Current cases			Sources
Date	New	Total	New	Total	New	Total	Active	ICU	Ventilators	Sources
1	1,828	302,580	2,486	275,903	5	1,135	25,542	198	90	
2	1,555	304,135	2,528	278,431	6	1,141	24,563	204	96	
3	1,745	305,880	2,276	280,707	7	1,148	24,025	195	95	
4	2,063	307,943	2,922	283,629	5	1,153	23,161	193	99	
5	2,154	310,097	3,257	286,904	6	1,159	22,034	184	87	
6	1,680	311,777	2,548	289,452	7	1,166	21,159	172	84	
7	1,683	313,460	2,506	291,958	3	1,169	20,333	174	81	
8	1,529	314,989	2,076	294,034	8	1,177	19,778	160	79	
9	1,280	316,629	2,345	296,379	9	1,186	18,704	155	76	
10	1,448	317,717	2,137	298,516	5	1,191	18,010	151	72	
11	1,647	319,364	2,104	300,620	9	1,200	17,544	147	61	
12	1,575	320,939	2,042	302,662	3	1,203	17,074	147	67	
13	1,470	322,409	1,830	304,492	3	1,206	16,711	162	70	
14	1,354	323,763	1,782	306,724	4	1,210	16,279	158	71	
15	1,208	324,971	1,973	308,247	3	1,213	15,511	155	70	
16	1,063	326,034	1,365	309,612	5	1,218	15,204	152	68	
17	1,219	327,253	1,346	310,958	2	1,220	15,075	154	64	
18	1,213	328,466	1,503	312,461	3	1,223	14,782	155	54	
19	1,576	330,042	1,996	314,457	2	1,225	14,360	151	57	
20	1,671	331,713	1,585	316,042	4	1,229	14,442	151	64	
21	1,327	333,040	1,247	317,289	4	1,233	14,518	154	65	
22	1,116	334,156	1,495	318,784	5	1,238	14,134	156	60	
23	1,384	335,540	1,058	319,842	6	1,244	14,454	148	62	
24	1,268	336,808	1,083	320,925	2	1,246	14,637	161	73	
25	1,360	338,168	1,491	322,416	2	1,248	14,504	157	72	
26	1,275	339,443	1,509	323,925	1	1,249	14,269	161	70	
27	1,199	340,642	1,257	325,182	2	1,251	14,209	167	72	
28	1,302	341,944	1,127	326,309	4	1,255	14,380	169	76	
29	941	342,885	1,097	327,406	5	1,260	14,219	166	73	
30	1,133	344,018	1,148	328,554	5	1,265	14,199	161	76	
31	1,482	345,500	1,070	329,624	7	1,272	14,604	164	81	

On 1 March, the director-general Noor Hisham Abdullah confirmed that seven new clusters were detected in Johor (three), Selangor (two), Kelantan (one), and Kuala Lumpur (one), bringing the total number of active clusters to 488.

On 6 March, the director-general Noor Hisham confirmed Malaysia's first two cases resulting from the B.1525 variant through overseas travel from the United Arab Emirates.

On 12 March, the director-general confirmed there were 440 active clusters in the country.

On 18 March, the director-general confirmed that over 99 cases (roughly 11% of cases reported that day) were linked to prisons and detention clusters.

On 25 March, the director-general confirmed that there have been 41 clusters originating in schools and universities since January 2021, resulting in 2,268 positive cases. 1,058 of these cases originated in institutions of higher learning, 631 cases in secondary schools, 419 in preschools and primary schools, and 120 in others.

=== April ===
Date	Cases		Recoveries		Deaths		Current cases			Sources
Date	New	Total	New	Total	New	Total	Active	ICU	Ventilators	Sources
1	1,178	346,678	1,377	331,001	6	1,278	14,399	163	81	
2	1,294	347,972	1,442	332,443	5	1,283	14,246	168	78	
3	1,638	349,610	1,449	333,892	3	1,286	14,432	167	81	
4	1,349	350,959	1,270	335,162	2	1,288	14,509	186	94	
5	1,070	352,029	1,294	336,456	7	1,295	14,278	180	89	
6	1,300	353,329	1,412	337,868	5	1,300	14,161	189	88	
7	1,139	354,468	1,199	339,067	4	1,304	14,907	194	86	
8	1,285	355,753	1,175	340,242	4	1,308	14,203	186	81	
9	1,854	357,607	1,247	341,489	5	1,313	14,805	169	79	
10	1,510	359,117	1,248	342,737	8	1,321	15,059	194	81	
11	1,739	360,856	1,216	343,953	8	1,329	15,574	183	81	
12	1,317	362,173	1,052	345,005	4	1,333	15,835	188	84	
13	1,767	363,940	1,290	346,295	12	1,345	16,300	199	82	
14	1,889	365,829	1,485	347,780	8	1,353	16,696	204	79	
15	2,148	367,977	1,259	349,039	10	1,363	17,575	212	82	
16	2,551	370,528	1,524	350,563	2	1,365	18,600	227	91	
17	2,331	372,859	1,832	352,395	5	1,370	19,094	225	92	
18	2,195	375,054	1,427	352,822	8	1,378	19,854	219	90	
19	2,078	377,132	1,402	355,224	8	1,386	20,522	228	93	
20	2,341	379,473	1,592	356,816	3	1,389	21,268	249	95	
21	2,340	381,813	1,910	358,726	11	1,400	21,687	248	101	
22	2,875	384,688	2,541	361,267	7	1,407	22,014	248	115	
23	2,847	387,535	2,341	363,608	8	1,415	22,512	260	125	
24	2,717	390,252	2,292	365,900	11	1,426	22,926	272	124	
25	2,690	392,942	1,853	367,753	10	1,436	23,753	283	121	
26	2,776	395,718	1,803	369,556	13	1,449	24,713	300	133	
27	2,733	398,451	2,019	371,575	13	1,462	25,414	294	138	
28	3,142	401,593	1,822	373,397	15	1,477	26,719	306	151	
29	3,332	404,925	1,943	375,340	15	1,492	28,093	309	147	
30	3,788	408,713	2,640	377,980	14	1,506	29,277	328	161	

On 2 April, the director general Noor Hisham Abdullah confirmed that there were 363 active clusters throughout Malaysia. He also confirmed that nine clusters (Seberang Prai Prison, Damai Pelangi, Teknologi Berendam, Pasar Borong KL 2, Jalan Jasmine, Jalan Empat, Jalan Industri Kidamai, Subang Tiga and Persiaran Alam) have ended. In addition, ten new clusters were identified in Banjaran Gading, Simpang Empat, Industri Bukit Angkat, Jalan Taat, Jalan Bukit Nanas, Jalan Padang, Wakaf Chagak, Kalindukan, Permatang Pasir and Pekan Batu.

On 7 April, the director-general reported ten new clusters in Johor, Selangor, Penang and Sarawak, bringing the number of active clusters to 354.

On 13 April, a total of 1,767 new cases were reported, bringing the number of active cases to 16,300. That day, Sarawak reported 607 new cases, the highest reported in a single day in that state.

In response to rising cases, the Health Minister Adham Baba proposed retaining a ban on interstate travel during the Eid al-Fitr period. In addition, the director-general confirmed two new cases of the B.1.1.7 variant on 15 April.

According to Health Minister Adham Baba, 4,868 COVID-19 infections and 89 clusters have been linked to the education sector as of 20 April 2021.

On 28 April, the National Security Council (NSC) agreed to allow students of institutions of higher learning (IPT) to travel interstate from their campus to their homes for the Eid al-Fitr break, except for Sarawak, from 7 to 12 of May and return to campus on designated dates.

=== May ===
Date	Cases		Recoveries		Deaths		Current cases			Sources
Date	New	Total	New	Total	New	Total	Active	ICU	Ventilators	Sources
1	2,881	411,594	2,462	380,442	15	1,521	29,631	337	176	
2	3,418	415,012	2,698	383,140	12	1,533	30,339	345	175	
3	2,500	417,512	2,068	385,508	18	1,551	30,753	352	186	
4	3,120	420,632	2,334	387,542	23	1,574	31,516	338	181	
5	3,744	424,376	2,304	389,846	17	1,591	32,939	328	185	
6	3,551	427,927	2,709	392,555	19	1,610	33,762	354	199	
7	4,498	432,425	3,449	396,004	22	1,632	34,789	375	211	
8	4,519	436,944	2,719	398,721	25	1,657	36,564	393	210	
9	3,733	440,677	3,211	401,934	26	1,683	37,060	416	216	
10	3,807	444,484	3,454	405,388	17	1,700	37,396	434	224	
11	3,973	448,457	2,848	408,236	22	1,722	38,499	453	224	
12	4,765	453,222	3,124	411,360	39	1,761	40,101	469	244	
13	4,855	458,077	3,347	414,707	27	1,788	41,582	481	247	
14	4,113	462,190	4,190	418,897	34	1,822	41,471	482	250	
15	4,140	466,430	3,423	422,329	44	1,866	42,135	503	272	
16	3,780	470,110	3,990	426,319	36	1,902	41,889	520	272	
17	4,446	474,556	2,784	429,103	45	1,947	43,506	522	273	
18	4,865	479,421	3,497	432,600	47	1,994	44,827	531	277	
19	6,075	485,496	3,516	436,116	46	2,040	47,340	559	303	
20	6,806	492,302	3,916	440,032	59	2,099	50,171	587	330	
21	6,493	498,795	4,503	444,540	50	2,149	52,106	643	363	
22	6,320	505,115	4,694	449,234	50	2,199	53,628	652	370	
23	6,976	512,091	3,587	452,821	49	2,248	57,022	681	361	
24	6,509	518,600	3,452	456,273	61	2,309	60,018	711	369	
25	7,289	525,889	3,789	460,062	60	2,369	63,458	726	373	
26	7,487	533,367	4,665	464,727	63	2,432	66,208	756	377	
27	7,857	541,224	4,598	469,325	59	2,491	69,408	771	392	
28	8,290	549,514	4,814	474,139	61	2,552	72,823	808	403	
29	9,020	558,534	5,527	479,666	98	2,650	76,218	844	430	
30	6,999	565,533	5,121	484,787	79	2,729	78,017	846	419	
31	6,824	572,357	5,121	490,038	67	2,796	79,523	851	422	

On 2 May, Malaysia reported its first case of the Indian variant of COVID-19 from an Indian national who had landed at Kuala Lumpur International Airport.

On 4 May, 17 new clusters were identified in Sarawak, Johor, Kedah, Labuan, Selangor, Kuala Lumpur, Penang, Perak and Sabah. Seven of these involved the community, five involved the workplace, four involved the education sector, and one religious-linked cluster.

On 12 May, Malaysia's daily death toll reached a new record of 39 deaths. On 15 May, this record was surpassed with 44 deaths recorded that day, bringing the death toll to 1,866.

On 17 May, Malaysia's daily death toll reached a new record of 45 deaths. That day, Selangor topped the highest number of infections (1,650) and deaths (20). Sarawak recorded the highest infection rate (433) followed by Johor (391) and Kelantan (343). On 18 May, the country recorded a new daily record of 47 deaths.

On 19 May, the national death toll reached the 2,000 mark, with a total of 2,040 deaths. On 20 May, the country reached a new daily record of 59 deaths. On 22 May, the total number of cases exceeded the 500,000 mark, reaching 505,115.

By 24 May, the daily death toll had reached a new record of 61 deaths, with a total of 2,309 deaths. By 25 May, the daily death toll had reach a new record of 63 deaths, bringing the death toll to 2,432. By 29 May, the daily death toll had reached a record of 98 deaths, bringing the death toll to 2,650.

=== June ===
Date	Cases		Recoveries		Deaths		Current cases			Sources
Date	New	Total	New	Total	New	Total	Active	ICU	Ventilators	Sources
1	7,105	579,462	6,083	496,121	71	2,867	80,474	872	419	
2	7,703	587,165	5,777	501,898	126	2,993	82,274	878	441	
3	8,209	595,374	7,049	508,947	103	3,096	83,331	880	446	
4	7,748	603,122	6,624	515,571	86	3,182	84,369	883	459	
5	7,452	610,754	6,105	521,676	109	3,291	85,607	886	446	
6	6,241	616,815	5,133	526,809	87	3,378	86,628	890	444	
7	5,271	622,086	7,548	534,357	82	3,460	84,269	902	447	
8	5,566	627,652	6,962	541,319	76	3,536	82,797	903	458	
9	6,239	633,891	7,386	548,705	75	3,611	81,575	905	453	
10	5,671	639,562	7,362	556,030	73	3,684	79,848	911	461	
11	6,849	646,411	7,749	563,779	84	3,768	78,864	912	458	
12	5,793	652,204	8,334	572,113	76	3,844	76,247	914	459	
13	5,304	657,508	8,163	580,276	64	3,908	73,324	917	452	
14	4,949	662,457	6,588	586,864	60	3,968	71,625	921	459	
15	5,419	667,876	6,831	593,695	101	4,069	70,112	922	450	
16	5,150	673,026	7,240	600,935	73	4,142	67,949	924	453	
17	5,738	678,764	7,530	608,465	60	4,202	66,097	909	441	
18	6,440	685,204	6,861	615,326	74	4,276	65,602	894	451	
19	5,911	691,115	6,918	622,244	72	4,348	64,523	886	441	
20	5,293	696,408	5,941	628,185	60	4,408	63,815	880	454	
21	4,611	701,019	5,439	633,624	69	4,477	62,918	880	452	
22	4,743	705,762	5,577	639,181	77	4,554	62,027	875	445	
23	5,244	711,006	6,372	645,553	83	4,637	60,816	879	433	
24	5,841	716,847	5,411	650,964	84	4,721	61,162	869	438	
25	5,812	722,659	6,775	657,739	82	4,803	60,117	870	433	
26	5,803	728,462	5,193	662,932	81	4,884	60,646	866	435	
27	5,586	734,048	4,777	667,709	60	4,944	61,395	886	446	
28	5,218	739,266	4,744	672,453	57	5,001	61,812	899	451	
29	6,437	745,703	5,298	677,751	107	5,108	62,844	905	455	
30	6,276	751,979	4,929	682,680	62	5,170	64,129	905	452	

On 2 June, Malaysia reported a daily record of 126 deaths, bringing the death toll to 2,993. In addition, the number of recoveries met the 500,000 mark, reaching 501,898. By 3 June, the death toll had exceeded the 3,000 mark, reaching 3,096. By 4 June, the total number of cases had reached the 600,000 hallmark, reaching 603,122.

By 6 June, a record of 30 new clusters were reported in Malaysia, bringing the total number of active clusters to 713. 18 of the new clusters were linked to workplaces, seven in the community while two originated from education institutions.

On 15 June, 101 new deaths were reported, bringing the death toll to 4,069. By 16 June, the total number of recoveries had risen to 600,935.

By 21 June, the total number of cases exceeded 700,000, reaching 701,019.

On 23 June, Malaysia officially surpassed China's death numbers.

On 28 June, Malaysia's death toll reached a new record of 5,001 cases.

=== July ===
Date	Cases		Recoveries		Deaths		Current cases			Sources
Date	New	Total	New	Total	New	Total	Active	ICU	Ventilators	Sources
1	6,988	758,967	5,580	688,260	84	5,254	65,453	917	445	
2	6,982	765,949	6,278	694,538	73	5,327	66,084	905	443	
3	6,685	772,607	5,677	700,215	107	5,434	66,958	892	443	
4	6,045	778,652	5,271	705,486	63	5,497	67,660	917	443	
5	6,387	785,039	4,523	710,018	77	5,547	69,447	923	433	
6	7,654	792,693	4,797	714,815	103	5,677	72,201	943	450	
7	7,097	799,790	4,863	719,678	91	5,768	74,344	948	441	
8	8,868	808,658	5,082	725,678	135	5,903	77,275	952	445	
9	9,180	817,838	5,713	731,193	77	5,980	80,665	959	465	
10	9,353	827,191	5,910	737,103	87	6,067	84,021	959	451	
11	9,105	836,296	5,194	742,297	91	6,158	87,841	961	455	
12	8,574	844,870	5,041	747,338	102	6,260	91,272	964	452	
13	11,079	855,949	5,990	735,328	125	6,385	96,236	972	436	
14	11,618	867,567	6,377	759,705	118	6,503	101,359	878	432	
15	13,215	880,782	6,095	765,800	110	6,613	108,369	885	432	
16	12,541	893,323	6,742	772,542	115	6,728	114,053	896	459	
17	12,528	905,851	6,629	779,171	138	6,866	119,814	908	425	
18	10,710	916,561	5,778	784,949	153	7,019	123,593	909	445	
19	10,972	927,533	6,439	791,388	129	7,148	128,997	915	435	
20	12,366	939,899	7,567	798,955	93	7,241	133,703	924	448	
21	11,985	951,884	7,902	806,857	199	7,440	137,587	927	459	
22	13,034	964,918	8,436	815,293	134	7,574	142,051	938	459	
23	15,573	980,491	10,094	825,387	144	7,718	147,386	939	456	
24	15,902	996,393	9,471	834,858	184	7,902	153,633	950	468	
25	17,045	1,013,438	9,683	844,451	92	7,994	160,903	970	501	
26	14,516	1,027,954	9,372	853,913	207	8,207	165,840	1,009	524	
27	16,117	1,044,071	11,526	865,439	207	8,408	170,224	1,023	524	
28	1,7405	1,061,476	12,373	877,812	143	8,551	175,113	1,016	529	
29	17,170	1,078,646	12,930	890,742	174	8,725	179,179	1,043	531	
30	16,840	1,095,486	12,179	902,921	134	8,859	183,706	1,055	532	
31	17,786	1,113,272	11,718	914,649	165	9,024	189,609	1,062	534	

On 3 July, the total number of recoveries exceeded the 700,000 mark, reaching 700,215.

On 8 July, the total number of cases exceeded the 800,000 mark, reaching 800,658.

On 10 July, the death toll exceeded the 6,000 mark, reaching 6,067.

On 14 July, the number of active cases exceeded the 100,000 mark, reaching 101,359.

On 17 July, the total number of cases exceeded the 900,000 mark, reaching 905,851.

On 18 July, a new record of 153 deaths were reported, bringing the death toll to 7,019.

On 21 July, a new record of 199 deaths were reported, bringing the death toll to 7,440. The total number of recoveries also met the 800,00 mark, reaching 806,857.

On 25 July, the total number of cases exceeded the one million mark, reaching 1,013,438.

On 26 July, a new record of 207 deaths were reported, bringing the death toll to 8,207.

On 30 July, the total number of recoveries exceeded the 900,000 mark, reaching 902,921.

On 31 July, the death toll exceeded the 9,000 mark, reaching 9,024.

=== August ===
Date	Cases		Recoveries		Deaths		Current cases			Sources
Date	New	Total	New	Total	New	Total	Active	ICU	Ventilators	Sources
1	17,150	1,130,422	11,326	925,965	160	9,184	195,273	1,059	531	
2	15,764	1,146,186	11,767	937,732	219	9,403	199,501	1,063	532	
3	17,105	1,163,291	12,297	950,029	195	9,598	203,664	1,066	537	
4	19,819	1,183,110	12,704	962,733	257	9,855	210,522	1,069	553	
5	20,596	1,203,706	13,893	976,626	164	10,019	217,061	1,078	549	
6	20,889	1,224,595	16,394	993,020	158	10,179	221,396	1,096	545	
7	19,257	1,243,852	16,323	1,009,343	210	10,389	224,120	1,097	575	
8	18,688	1,262,540	17,055	1,026,398	360	10,749	225,393	1,095	571	
9	17,236	1,279,776	15,187	1,041,585	212	10,961	227,230	1,095	579	
10	19,991	1,299,767	16,258	1,057,843	201	11,162	230,762	1,096	570	
11	20,780	1,320547	17,973	1,075,816	211	11,373	233,358	1,053	546	
12	21,668	1,342,215	17,687	1,093,503	318	11,691	237,021	1,059	543	
13	21,468	1,363,683	17,025	1,110,528	277	11,968	241,187	1,075	537	
14	20,670	1,384,353	17,655	1,128,183	260	12,228	243,942	1,096	540	
15	20,546	1,404,899	16,945	1,145,128	282	12,510	247,261	1,059	526	
16	19,740	1,424,639	17,450	1,162,578	274	12,784	249,277	1,047	520	
17	19,631	1,444,270	16,468	1,179,046	293	13,077	252,147	1,054	525	
18	22,242	1,466,512	19,690	1,198,726	225	13,302	254,484	1,060	540	
19	22,948	1,489,460	21,720	1,220,446	178	13,480	255,534	1,060	528	
20	23,564	1,513,024	21,448	1,241,894	233	13,713	257,417	1,062	518	
21	22,262	1,535,286	18,576	1,260,470	223	13,936	260,880	1,035	513	
22	19,807	1,555,093	18,200	1,278,670	232	14,168	262,255	1,026	496	
23	17,672	1,572,765	19,053	1,297,723	174	14,342	260,700	1,040	502	
24	20,837	1,593,602	18,613	1,316,336	211	14,553	262,713	1,093	511	
25	22,642	1,616,244	20,798	1,337,134	265	14,818	264,292	1,003	490	
26	24,599	1,640,843	22,657	1,359,791	393	15,211	265,841	990	487	
27	22,055	1,662,913	21,877	1,381,668	339	15,550	265,695	982	470	
28	22,597	1,685,510	19,492	1,401,160	252	15,802	268,548	986	451	
29	20,579	1,706,089	20,845	1,422,005	285	16,087	267,997	1,009	477	
30	19,628	1,725,357	21,257	1,443,262	295	16,382	265,713	1,033	476	
31	20,897	1,746,254	18,465	1,461,727	282	16,664	267,863	1,005	464	

On 3 August, the total number of active cases exceeded the 200,000 mark, reaching 203,664.

On 4 August, Malaysia reported a new record of 19,819 new cases and a new record of 257 deaths.

On 5 August, Malaysia reached a new record of 20,596 new cases while the death toll exceeded 10,000, reaching 10,019.

On 6 August, Malaysia reported a new record of 20,889 new cases.

On 7 August, the total number of recoveries exceed 1 million, reaching 1,009,343.

On 8 August, a record of 360 deaths were reported.

On 9 August, singer and businesswoman, Siti Sarah died from COVID-19 after she gave birth to her fourth child three days prior. Before her death, she was 8 months pregnant at that time.

On 10 August, the death toll peaked the 11,000 mark, reaching 11,162.

On 14 August, the death toll peaked the 12,000 mark, reaching 12,228.

On 17 August, the death toll peaked the 13,000 mark, reaching 13,077.

On 22 August, the death toll peaked the 14,000 mark, reaching 14,168.

On 23 August, a record 393 deaths were reported, bringing the death toll to 15,211.

On 29 August, the death roll peaked the 16,000 mark, reaching 16,087.

=== September ===
Date	Cases		Recoveries		Deaths		Current cases			Sources
Date	New	Total	New	Total	New	Total	Active	ICU	Ventilators	Sources
1	18,762	1,765,016	21,073	1,482,800	278	16,942	265,274	1,007	464	
2	20,988	1,786,004	23,473	1,506,273	249	17,191	265,540	1,001	470	
3	19,378	1,805,382	22,399	1,528,672	330	17,521	259,189	975	463	
4	19,057	1,824,439	21,582	1,550,254	362	17,883	256,302	978	460	
5	20,396	1,844,835	20,573	1,570,827	336	18,219	255,789	959	436	
6	17,352	1,862,187	20,201	1,591,208	272	18,491	252,668	975	435	
7	18,457	1,880,734	18,902	1,609,930	311	18,802	252,002	997	447	
8	19,730	1,895,865	22,701	1,632,628	361	19,163	248,676	1,282	744	
9	19,307	1,919,774	24,835	1,657,486	323	19,486	242,802	1,310	737	
10	21,176	1,940,950	21,476	1,678,959	341	19,827	242,161	1,310	773	
11	19,550	1,960,500	21,771	1,700,730	592	20,419	239,351	1,272	724	
12	19,193	1,975,074	20,980	1,721,710	292	20,711	237,277	1,338	721	
13	16,073	1,991,126	24,813	1,746,523	413	21,124	228,124	1,301	687	
14	15,669	2,011,440	18,053	1,764,576	463	21,587	225,277	1,242	692	
15	19,495	2,030,935	18,760	1,783,336	422	22,009	225,590	1,280	638	
16	18,815	2,049,750	16,939	1,800,278	346	22,355	227,210	1,234	710	
17	17,577	2,067,327	22,970	1,823,245	388	22,743	221,339	1,204	708	
18	15,549	2,078,188	17,205	1,840,450	324	23,067	219,359	1,165	690	
19	14,954	2,097,830	23,469	1,863,919	376	23,433	210,468	1,191	662	
20	14,345	2,112,175	16,814	1,880,733	301	23,744	207,698	1,154	633	
21	15,759	2,127,934	16,650	1,897,393	334	24,078	206,473	1,116	635	
22	14,990	2,142,924	19,702	1,917,085	487	24,565	201,274	1,115	618	
23	13,754	2,156,678	16,628	1,933,713	116	24,681	198,284	1,117	615	
24	14,554	2,171,232	16,751	1,950,464	250	24,932	195,837	1,049	599	
25	13,899	2,185,131	18,074	1,968,538	228	25,159	191,434	1,070	598	
26	13,104	2,198,235	20,971	1,989,509	278	25,437	183,289	1,050	582	
27	10,959	2,209,194	16,430	2,005,942	258	25,695	177,560	980	579	
28	11,332	2,220,526	14,160	2,020,099	240	25,935	174,492	985	563	
29	12,434	2,232,960	17,000	2,037,099	208	26,143	169,718	978	565	
30	12,735	2,245,695	17,725	2,054,824	192	26,335	164,536	924	510	

On 2 September, the death toll exceeded the 17,000 figure, reaching 17,191.

On 5 September, the death toll exceeded the 18,000 figure, reaching 18,219.

On 8 September, the death toll exceeded the 19,000 figure, reaching 19,163.

On 11 September, a record of 592 deaths were reported. The death toll exceeded the 20,000 figure, reaching 20,419.

On 13 September, the death toll exceeded the 21,000 figure, reaching 21,124.

On 14 September, the total number of cases reached the two million mark, reaching 2,011,440.

On 23 September, the total number of active cases dropped below the 200,000 mark, reaching 198,284.

On 27 September, the total number of recoveries reached the two million mark, reaching 2,005,942.

=== October ===
Date	Cases		Recoveries		Deaths		Current cases			Sources
Date	New	Total	New	Total	New	Total	Active	ICU	Ventilators	Sources
1	11,889	2,257,584	15,891	2,070,715	121	26,456	160,413	900	488	
2	10,915	2,268,499	15,396	2,086,111	109	26,565	155,823	890	485	
3	9,066	2,277,565	14,454	2,100,565	116	26,683	150,317	835	535	
4	8,075	2,285,640	15,456	2,116,021	76	26,759	142,860	867	461	
5	8,817	2,294,457	15,615	2,131,636	117	26,876	135,495	846	441	
6	9,380	2,303,837	13,045	2,144,681	105	26,981	132,175	847	445	
7	9,890	2,313,727	12,884	2,157,565	132	27,113	129,049	827	445	
8	9,751	2,323,478	12,724	2,170,289	78	27,191	125,998	792	385	
9	8,743	2,332,221	14,422	2,184,711	74	27,265	120,246	768	418	
10	7,373	2,339,594	10,959	2,195,669	64	27,329	116,596	762	410	
11	6,709	2,346,303	10,883	2,206,502	93	27,422	112,379	756	397	
12	7,726	2,353,579	10,555	2,217,057	103	27,525	108,997	724	398	
13	7,950	2,361,529	10,832	2,227,889	68	27,593	106,047	725	380	
14	8,084	2,369,613	12,456	2,240,345	88	27,681	101,587	702	367	
15	7,240	2,377,033	11,413	2,251,758	89	27,770	97,505	700	364	
16	7,493	2,384,542	9,531	2,261,289	88	95,395	694	344		
17	6,145	2,390,687	9,231	2,270,529	63	27,921	92,246	688	348	
18	5,434	2,396,121	8,435	2,278,955	72	27,993	89,173	679	347	
19	5,745	2,401,866	8,933	2,287,888	69	28,026	85,916	676	330	
20	5,516	2,407,382	9,401	2,297,289	76	28,138	81,955	666	329	
21	6,210	2,413,592	7,562	2,304,851	96	28,234	89,337	666	306	
22	6,630	2,420,222	7,630	2,311,213	78	28,312	80,697	643	320	
23	5,828	2,426,050	9,178	2,320,391	42	28,354	77,305	630	297	
24	5,666	2,431,716	6,978	2,327,369	46	28,400	75,947	603	300	
25	4,782	2,436,498	7,414	2,334,783	92	28,492	73,223	602	300	
26	5,726	2,442,224	5,607	2,340,390	84	28,576	73,258	584	309	
27	6,148	2,448,372	7,595	2,347,985	98	28,674	71,713	562	292	
28	6,377	2454,749	6,637	2,354,622	95	28,769	71,358	464	299	
29	6,060	2,460,809	7,297	2,361,919,	63	28,832	70,058	667	300	
30	5,854	2,466,663	6,715	2,368,634	44	28,876	69,153	570	293	
31	4,979	2,471,642	6,127	2,374,761	36	28,912	67,969	562	326	

On 4 October, the number of active cases dropped below the 150,000 threshold, reaching 142,860.

As of 7 October, there are 911 active clusters, out of a total of 5,560 clusters reported since the stated of the pandemic.

As of 14 October, 17 new clusters were reported, bringing the total number of active clusters to 744.

On 15 October, the number of active cases dropped below the 100,000 threshold to 97,505.

=== November ===
Date	Cases		Recoveries		Deaths		Current cases			Sources
Date	New	Total	New	Total	New	Total	Active	ICU	Ventilators	Sources
1	4,626	2,476,268	5,299	2,380,060	63	28,975	67,233	569	301	
2	5,071	2,481,339	5,372	2,385,432	70	29,045	66,862	557	300	
3	5,291	2,486,630	4,947	2,390,379	46	29,091	67,160	546	286	
4	5,713	2,492,343	5,865	2,396,244	65	29,155	66,944	555	280	
5	4,922	2,497,265	5,579	2,401,823	47	29,202	66,240	549	282	
6	4,701	2,501,966	5,382	2,407,205	54	29,256	65,505	544	280	
7	4,343	2,506,309	5,190	2,412,395	35	29,291	64,623	552	272	
8	4,534	2,510,852	7,348	2,419,743	58	29,349	61,760	534	263	
9	5,403	2,517,173	5,311	2,425,943	78	29,427	61,803	542	268	
10	6,243	2,522,498	5,068	2,430,122	59	29,486	62,890	544	280	
11	6,323	2,528,821	5,337	2,435,459	49	29,535	63,827	538	274	
12	6,517	2,535,338	6,026	2,441,485	41	29,576	64,277	543	268	
13	5,809	2,541,147	4,712	2,446,197	55	29,631	65,319	527	277	
14	5,612	2,546,309	5,019	2,451,216	45	29,676	65,417	524	265	
15	5,143	2,551,452	4,551	2,455,767	53	29,729	65,956	526	250	
16	5,413	2,556,865	6,013	2,461,780	40	29,769	65,316	545	264	
17	6,228	2,563,153	4,743	2,466,523	68	29,837	66,793	536	251	
18	6,380	2,569,533	5,760	2,472,383	55	29,892	67,358	541	263	
19	6,355	2,575,888	5,031	2,477,314	45	29,937	68,637	542	268	
20	5,859	2,581,747	4,970	2,482,284	38	29,978	69,485	529	261	
21	4,854	2,586,601	5,525	2,487,809	24	30,002	68,790	541	267	
22	4,885	2,591,486	5,628	2,493,437	63	30,063	67,986	549	274	
23	5,994	2,597,080	4,098	2,498,345	47	30,110	68,625	532	266	
24	5,755	2,602,835	5,082	2,503,427	37	30,147	69,261	506	270	
25	6,144	2,608,979	6,602	2,510,029	48	30,195	68,755	516	272	
26	5,501	2,614,480	6,664	2,516,693	45	30,240	67,547	519	267	
27	5,097	2,619,577	5,352	2,522,045	40	30,280	67,252	510	258	
28	4,239	2,623,816	5,007	2,527,052	29	30,309	66,455	511	261	
29	4,087	2,627,903	4,984	2,532,036	61	30,370	65,497	507	272	
30	4,879	2,632,782	5,168	2,537,204	55	30,425	65,153	509	252	

On 2 November, the death toll met the 29,000 threshold, reaching 29,045.

On 21 November, the death toll met the 30,000 threshold, reaching 30,002.

=== December ===
Date	Cases		Recoveries		Deaths		Current cases			Sources
Date	New	Total	New	Total	New	Total	Active	ICU	Ventilators	Sources
1	5,439	2,638,221	6,803	2,544,007	49	30,474	63,740	500	258	
2	5,806	2,644,027	7,246	2,551,253	47	30,521	62,253	511	266	
3	5,551	2,649,578	5,301	2,556,554	17	30,538	62,486	499	269	
4	4,896	2,654,474	4,678	2,561,232	36	30,574	62,668	490	269	
5	4,298	2,658,772	4,929	2,566,159	40	30,614	61,999	471	264	
6	4,262	2,663,034	5,894	2,572,053	38	30,652	60,329	463	249	
7	4,965	2,667,999	4,817	2,576,870	66	30,718	60,411	437	240	
8	5,020	2,673,019	4,525	2,581,395	28	30,746	60,878	428	237	
9	5,446	2,678,465	5,427	2,586,822	41	30,787	60,856	419	232	
10	5,058	2,683,523	4,997	2,591,819	44	30,831	60,873	393	212	
11	4,626	2,688,149	4,690	2,596,509	31	30,862	60,778	396	211	
12	3,490	2,691,639	5,399	2,601,908	17	30,879	58,852	407	216	
13	3,504	2,695,143	4,401	2,606,309	29	30,908	57,926	408	206	
14	4,097	2,699,240	4,301	2,610,610	48	30,956	57,674	382	201	
15	3,900	2,703,140	4,552	2,615,162	33	30,989	56,989	384	213	
16	4,262	2,707,402	4,985	2,620,147	37	31,026	56,229	383	198	
17	4,362	2,711,764	5,098	2,625,245	18	31,044	55,475	400	198	
18	4,083	2,715,847	5,435	2,630,680	29	31,073	54,094	391	215	
19	3,108	2,718,955	3,701	2,634,381	19	31,092	53,482	390	211	
20	2,589	2,721,544	3,810	2,638,191	43	31,135	52,218	379	210	
21	3,082	2,724,684	4,278	2,642,469	57	31,192	51,023	353	189	
22	3,519	2,728,203	5,118	2,647,587	29	31,221	49,395	338	186	
23	3,510	2,731,713	4,998	2,652,585	44	31,265	47,863	329	179	
24	3,528	2,735,241	4,489	2,657,074	25	31,290	46,877	339	180	
25	3,160	2,738,401	4,421	2,661,495	25	31,315	45,591	324	175	
26	2,778	2,741,179	3,539	2,665,030	19	31,334	44,815	306	170	
27	2,757	2,743,936	4,620	2,669,650	35	31,369	42,917	297	169	
28	2,897	2,746,833	3,434	2,673,084	23	31,392	42,357	302	169	
29	3,683	2,750,516	4,322	2,677,406	36	31,428	41,682	288	162	
30	3,997	2,754,513	3,984	2,677,068	34	31,462	45,983	281	155	
31	3,573	2,758,086	3,988	2,685,378	25	41,221	31,487	269	163	

On 3 December, Malaysia reported its first case of the Omicron variant. The individual was a foreign student who had returned from visiting her family in South Africa.

On 18 December, Director-general of Health Noor Hisham Abdullah confirmed 11 new cases of the Omicron variant, all resulting from overseas travel. These cases are connected to the 18 suspected cases dating back to 16 December.

On 22 December, the number of active cases dropped below the 50,000 threshold, reaching 49,395.
