= Timeline of the COVID-19 pandemic in Malaysia (2024) =

The following is a timeline of the COVID-19 pandemic in Malaysia during 2024. These two countries are the very last to report COVID-19 cases, which is Malaysia and New Zealand.

== Timeline ==
=== January ===
Date	Cases		Recoveries		Deaths		Current cases			Sources
Date	New	Total	New	Total	New	Total	Active	ICU	Ventilators	Sources
6	2,330	5,244,578	2,821	5,182,800	22	37,315	23,792	37	20	
13	1,355	5,257,009	2,316	5,199,997	8	37,323	19,689	27	13	
20	857	5,265,367	1,343	5,212,384	12	37,335	15,684	17	10	
27	411	5,269,967	863	5,220,707	5	37,340	11,920	11	9	

On 1 January 2024, the Deputy Education Minister Wong Kah Woh encouraged teachers and students to wear face masks, and staff members to do self-tests if they have COVID-19 symptoms.

On 12 January, Health Minister Dr. Dzulkefly Ahmad stated that the Health Ministry would not be setting up field hospitals following a decrease in COVID-19 cases.

On 13 January, four COVID-19 cases including a baby were detected at temporary flood evacuation centres in Johor state.

=== February ===
Date	Cases		Recoveries		Deaths		Current cases			Sources
Date	New	Total	New	Total	New	Total	Active	ICU	Ventilators	Sources
3	190	5,272,517	409	5,225,276	7	37,347	9,894	9	6	
10	170	5,273,996	188	5,227,828	0	37,347	8,821	4	3	
17	142	5,274,786	166	5,229,308	0	37,347	8,131	3	2	
24	97	5,275,667	143	5,230,084	0	37,347	8,236	3	2	

On 13 February, several health authorities including Medical Practitioners Coalition Association of Malaysia president Dr Raj Kumar Maharajah and Health Minister Datuk Seri Dr. Dzulkefly Ahmad reported a downward trend in COVID-19 cases, hospitalisation and deaths in the 14 day period leading up to 10 February.

=== March ===
Date	Cases		Recoveries		Deaths		Current cases			Sources
Date	New	Total	New	Total	New	Total	Active	ICU	Ventilators	Sources
1	63	5,276,312	97	5,230,953	1	37,348	8,011	1	1	
8	65	5,276,880	66	5,231,597	0	37,348	7,935	1	1	
15	82	5,277,473	64	5,232,165	0	37,348	7,960	2	2	
22	74	5,277,929	94	5,232,678	0	37,348	7,833	0	0	
29	60	5,278,355	75	5,233,212	0	37,348	7,795	0	0	

On 25 March, the Health Ministry confirmed that COVID-19 would be integrated into the country's broader health approach as Malaysia transitioned into the endemic phase.

=== April ===
Date	Cases		Recoveries		Deaths		Current cases			Sources
Date	New	Total	New	Total	New	Total	Active	ICU	Ventilators	Sources
6	83	5,278,836	60	5,233,636	1	37,349	7,851	0	0	
13	27	5,279,145	63	5,234,074	0	37,349	7,722	0	0	
20	118	5,279,855	27	5,234,377	0	37,349	8,129	3	3	
27	86	5,280,589	114	5,234,988	1	37,350	8,251	2	1	

On 8 April, Health Ministry spokesperson Datuk Dr Muhammad Radzi Abu Hassan confirmed that the number of COVID-19 cases had dropped by 97.1% to 493 cases between 31 March and 6 April, compared to 17,256 cases in the first week of January 2024.

=== May ===
Date	Cases		Recoveries		Deaths		Current cases			Sources
Date	New	Total	New	Total	New	Total	Active	ICU	Ventilators	Sources
4	108	5,281,323	88	5,235,721	0	37,350	8,252	2	0	
11	155	5,282,394	109	5,236,457	0	37,350	8,587	1	0	
18	164	5,283,624	155	5,237,526	0	37,350	8,748	-1	1	
25	222	5,284,992	162	5,238,755	1	37,351	8,886	1	0	

On 19 May, the Ministry of Health reported that the number of COVID-19 cases increased by 14.8 per cent to 1,230 cases between 12 and 18 May 2024. The Ministry confirmed that Malaysia had reported no COVID-19 fatalities since 25 April. The Ministry also announced it had heightened preparedness measures following a recent wave in Singapore between 5 and 11 May, which had seen a twofold increase in cases there.

=== June ===
Date	Cases		Recoveries		Deaths		Current cases			Sources
Date	New	Total	New	Total	New	Total	Active	ICU	Ventilators	Sources
1	234	5,287,104	223	5,240,356	-1	37,350	9,398	1	0	
15	323	5,291,716	323	5,243,699	1	37,351	10,666	0	3	
22	488	5,294,537	315	5,246,584	0	37,351	10,602	0	0	
29	419	5,298,347	485	5,249,401	0	37,351	11,595	0	6	

On 3 June, several public health professionals including Universiti Putra Malaysia Public Health Medicine expert Prof Dr Malina Osman, Universiti Kebangsaan Malaysia health economics and public health specialist Prof Dr Sharifa Ezat Wan Puteh and former Health Ministry official Datuk Zainal Ariffin Omar have urged people to take COVID-19 and flu vaccines in response to rising cases in Singapore and Australia.

On 9 June, Health Minister Datuk Seri Dr Dzulkefly Ahmad announced that post-Cabinet meeting had decided that Malaysia would continue a "living with COVID-19" approach.

On 13 June, Penang state health authorities confirmed they were monitoring COVID-19 and encouraged people to wear masks, practise social distancing and seek medical assistance for COVID-19 symptoms.

On 30 June, the Health Ministry announced that it would revise its COVID-19 standard operating procedure (SOP) to reflect the country's transition towards living with the COVID-19 pandemic.

=== July ===
Date	Cases		Recoveries		Deaths		Current cases			Sources
Date	New	Total	New	Total	New	Total	Active	ICU	Ventilators	Sources
6	416	5,302,017	415	5,253,207	0	37,351	11,459	-1	5	
13	309	5,304,850	412	5,256,882	0	37,351	10,617	0	5	
20	224	5,306,834	300	5,259,714	0	37,351	9,769	2	1	
27	182	5,308,325	215	5,261,703	0	37,351	9,271	-1	3	

On 5 July, the Health Ministry ended its policies of issuing Home Surveillance Orders (HSOs) to COVID-19 positive individuals and requiring positive individuals to report their COVID-19 self-test results to the MySejahtera app.

=== August ===
Date	Cases		Recoveries		Deaths		Current cases			Sources
Date	New	Total	New	Total	New	Total	Active	ICU	Ventilators	Sources
3	102	5,309,410	177	5,263,186	0	37,351	8,873	0	2	
10	131	5,310,340	95	5,264,271	0	37,351	8,718	0	0	
17	75	5,311,106	130	5,265,187	0	37,351	8,568	0	1	
24	113	5,311,920	77	5,265,955	0	37,351	8,614	0	0	

On 22 August, public health medicine specialist Professor Sharifa Ezat Wan Puteh warned members of the public to be vigilant about Long COVID while Dr Balwant Singh Gendeh of the Academy of Sciences Malaysia advised those showing COVID-19 symptoms for more than three weeks to seek medical attention.

=== September ===
Date	Cases		Recoveries		Deaths		Current cases			Sources
Date	New	Total	New	Total	New	Total	Active	ICU	Ventilators	Sources
1	84	5,312,619	108	5,266,784	0	37,351	8,484	0	1	
8	88	5,313,264	91	5,267,476	0	37,351	8,437	0	1	
15	75	5,313,862	87	5,268,108	0	37,351	8,403	0	1	
22	83	5,314,299	71	5,268,712	0	37,351	8,236	1	0	
29	74	5,314,962	81	5,269,150	0	37,351	8,352	1	1	

On 9 September, several NGOs including the Malaysian Society of Infection Control and Infectious Diseases (MyICID), National Cancer Society of Malaysia (NCSM), Malaysian Red Crescent Society (MRC) and Diabetes Malaysia (DM) urged the Malaysian public to continue with hygienic practises to protect vulnerable groups including unvaccinated children.

=== October ===
Date	Cases		Recoveries		Deaths		Current cases			Sources
Date	New	Total	New	Total	New	Total	Active	ICU	Ventilators	Sources
6	112	5,315,773	72	5,269,821	0	37,351	8,601	-1	1	
13	128	5,316,624	111	5,270,620	0	37,351	8,653	0	1	
20	93	5,317,521	122	5,271,486	0	37,351	8,684	0	0	
27	106	5,318,412	88	5,272,376	0	37,351	8,685	0	0	

=== November ===
Date	Cases		Recoveries		Deaths		Current cases			Sources
Date	New	Total	New	Total	New	Total	Active	ICU	Ventilators	Sources
3	86	5,319,203	106	5,273,260	0	37,351	8,592	0	1	
10	142	5,320,257	82	5,274,050	0	37,351	8,856	1	1	
17	145	5,321,424	135	5,275,125	0	37,351	8,948	0	1	
24	141	5,322,672	146	5,276,273	0	37,351	9,048	0	0	

=== December ===
Date	Cases		Recoveries		Deaths		Current cases			Sources
Date	New	Total	New	Total	New	Total	Active	ICU	Ventilators	Sources
1	179	5,324,043	129	5,277,524	0	37,351	9,168	-1	3	
8	192	5,325,663	182	5,278,911	0	37,351	9,401	-1	3	
15	187	5,327,385	210	5,280,533	0	37,351	9,501	0	0	
22	182	5,328,862	192	5,282,257	0	37,351	9,254	0	1	

On 4 December, Malaysian Prime Minister Anwar Ibrahim postponed the signing of the Johor-Singapore Special Economic Zone (JS-SEZ) agreement, initially scheduled for 9 December, to January 2025 after Singaporean Prime Minister Lawrence Wong tested positive for COVID-19.

On 23 December, the Malaysian Ministry of Health reported that the COVID-19 situation in Malaysia remained under control, with the number of reported bases dropping from 1,722 cases between 8 and 14 December to 1,477 cases between 15 and 21 December. The Ministry also reported that non-critical bed occupancy had fallen from 0.16 pe cent to 0.13 percent while ICU bed occupancy had declined from 0.14 percent to 0.10 percent. The Ministry also reported there had been no COVID-19 deaths since 25 April, with the total death toll for 2024 standing at 58 deaths.
