= Timeline of the COVID-19 pandemic in Malaysia (2022) =

The following is a timeline of the COVID-19 pandemic in Malaysia during 2022.

== Timeline ==
=== January ===
Date	Cases		Recoveries		Deaths		Current cases			Sources
Date	New	Total	New	Total	New	Total	Active	ICU	Ventilators	Sources
1	3,386	2,761,472	3,547	2,688,925	26	31,513	41,034	273	159	
2	2,882	2,764,354	3,291	2,692,216	19	31,352	40,606	284	156	
3	2,690	2,767,044	3,535	2,695,751	28	31,560	39,733	265	147	
4	2,842	2,769,886	2,862	2,698,613	31	31,591	39,682	252	134	
5	3,270	2,773,156	3,195	2,701,808	18	31,609	39,739	257	137	
6	3,543	2,776,699	3,484	2,705,292	19	31,628	39,779	253	130	
7	3,381	2,780,080	3,447	2,708,739	16	31,644	39,697	254	114	
8	3,251	2,783,331	3,161	2,711,900	11	31,655	39,776	253	115	
9	2,888	2,786,219	2,714	2,714,614	23	31,678	39,927	248	117	
10	2,641	2,788,860	2,808	2,717,422	18	31,696	39,742	253	106	
11	3,175	2,792,035	2,977	2,720,399	27	31,723	39,913	229	99	
12	3,198	2,795,233	3,200	2,723,599	15	31,738	39,896	215	105	
13	3,684	2,798,917	3,292	2,726,891	12	31,750	40,276	198	105	
14	3,346	2,802,263	3,052	2,729,943	12	31,762	40,558	204	95	
15	3,074	2,805,337	2,828	2,732,771	19	31,718	40,785	193	90	
16	3,010	2,808,347	2,584	2,735,355	12	31,793	41,199	182	83	
17	2,342	2,810,689	2,907	2,738,262	16	31,809	40,618	184	87	
18	3,245	2,813,934	3,093	2,741,355	9	31,818	40,761	183	84	
19	3,229	2,817,163	2,848	2,744,203	13	31,831	41,129	162	76	
20	3,764	2,820,927	3,254	2,747,457	22	31,853	41,167	160	72	
21	4,046	2,824,973	2,804	2,750,261	16	31,869	42,843	149	71	
22	4,116	2,829,089	2,858	2,753,119	14	31,882	44,088	141	62	
23	3,856	2,832,945	2,814	2,755,933	9	31,892	45,120	143	53	
24	3,214	2,836,159	3,116	2,759,049	10	31,902	45,208	146	65	
25	4,066	2,840,225	3,559	2,762,608	16	31,918	45,699	131	65	
26	4,744	2,844,969	3,646	2,766,254	12	31,930	46,785	129	72	
27	5,439	2,850,408	4,409	2,770,663	10	31,940	47,805	124	70	
28	5,522	2,855,930	3,285	2,773,948	12	31,952	50,030	127	70	
29	5,139	2,861,069	3,767	2,777,715	5	31,957	51,397	119	69	
30	4,915	2,865,984	3,056	2,780,771	8	31,965	53,248	120	65	
31	4,774	2,870,758	3,232	2,784,003	13	31,978	54,777	114	62	

On 12 January 2022, Health Minister Khairy Jamaluddin confirmed that fully-vaccinate travellers and travellers who had previously contracted COVID-19 would not need to undergo mandatory quarantine. Those who had been infected with COVID-19 had to present evidence they had been infected 11 to 60 days prior to travelling to Malaysia and a "fit to travel" letter.

On 16 January, the Malaysian Ministry of Health updated its isolation procedures for COVID-19 positive cases. Fully-vaccinated individuals with no symptoms have to isolate for seven days while individuals with incomplete vaccinations or are asymptomatic cases have to isolate for ten days.

=== February ===
Date	Cases		Recoveries		Deaths		Current cases			Sources
Date	New	Total	New	Total	New	Total	Active	ICU	Ventilators	Sources
1	5,566	2,876,324	3,187	2,787,187	7	31,985	57,152	113	59	
2	5,736	2,882,060	3,196	2,790,383	7	31,992	59,685	112	54	
3	5,720	2,887,780	3,968	2,794,354	8	32,000	61,426	114	56	
4	7,234	2,895,014	5,254	2,799,608	11	32,011	63,395	118	57	
5	9,117	2,904,131	6,546	2,806,154	14	32,025	65,952	123	67	
6	10,089	2,914,220	6,460	2,812,614	9	32,034	69,572	137	71	
7	11,034	2,925,254	6,036	2,818,650	9	32,043	74,561	135	81	
8	8,510	2,939,198	5,421	2,824,071	13	32,056	83,701	138	71	
9	17,134	2,956,332	5,681	2,829,752	9	32,065	94,515	147	79	
10	19,090	2,975,422	5,712	2,835,464	10	32,075	107,883	158	78	
11	20,939	2,996,361	5,807	2,841,271	24	32,099	122,991	155	80	
12	22,708	2,998,909	5,422	2,846,713	15	32,114	140,336	176	98	
13	21,072	3,040,235	5,274	2,852,437	11	32,125	155,673	187	109	
14	21,315	3,061,550	8,517	2,860,954	24	32,149	168,447	199	115	
15	22,053	3,063,203	7,584	2,868,538	31	32,180	182,965	194	120	
16	27,713	3,090,916	7,912	2,876,450	21	32,180	202,884	204	116	
17	26,569	3,117,485	11,744	2,888,194	39	32,239	217,781	216	141	
18	27,689	3,166,023	12,488	2,900,682	36	32,726	233,065	235	132	
19	28,825	3,194,848	18,514	2,919,196	34	32,310	243,342	238	130	
20	26,832	3,221,680	18,459	2,937,655	37	32,347	251,678	247	139	
21	25,099	3,246,779	17,749	2,955,404	43	32,390	258,985	272	164	
22	27,179	3,273,958	19,037	2,974,441	43	32,433	267,084	286	180	
23	31,199	3,305,157	20,399	2,994,840	55	32,488	277,829	305	191	
24	32,070	3,337,227	23,332	3,018,172	46	32,534	286,521	327	201	
25	30,644	3,367,871	22,678	3,040,850	57	32,591	294,430	332	196	
26	27,299	3,395,170	22,710	3,063,560	43	32,634	298,976	348	203	
27	24,466	3,419,636	22,710	3,086,270	40	32,674	300,692	353	193	
28	23,100	3,442,736	30,624	3,116,564	75	32,749	293,423	361	193	

On 9 February, former Malaysian Prime Minister Muhyiddin Yassin tested positive for COVID-19.

On 13 February, the total number of cases in Malaysia exceeded the 3 million mark, reaching 3,040,235.

By 24 February, the total number of recoveries in Malaysia had exceeded the 3 million mark, reaching 3,018,172.

By 24 February, the number of cases among children below the age of 11 had risen from 2,492 cases on 13 February to 3,863 on 25 February. In addition, cases among adolescents aged 12 to 17 rose from 1,496 on 13 February to 1,849 on 25 February. Similarly, cases among adults aged between 18 and 59 years rose from 12,634 on 13 February to 20,771 on 25 February. Likewise, cases among senior citizens (aged 60 years and above) rose from 1,334 on 13 February to 2,261 on 25 February.

=== March ===
Date	Cases		Recoveries		Deaths		Current cases			Sources
Date	New	Total	New	Total	New	Total	Active	ICU	Ventilators	Sources
1	25,854	3,468,590	25,548	3,142,112	78	32,827	293,651	374	213	
2	27,500	3,496,090	0	3,142,112	115	32,942	321,036	360	194	
3	32,467	3,528,557	27,629	3,197,298	86	33,028	298,231	355	208	
4	33,209	3,561,766	26,352	3,223,650	22	33,106	305,010	348	211	
5	33,406	3,595,172	27,143	3,250,793	67	33,173	311,206	371	226	
6	27,435	3,622,607	30,335	3,281,128	55	33,228	308,251	379	216	
7	26,856	3,649,463	30,726	3,311,854	77	33,305	304,304	368	223	
8	31,490	3,680,953	29,035	3,340,889	79	33,384	306,680	373	223	
9	30,246	3,711,199	26,653	3,367,542	113	33,497	310,160	388	225	
10	30,787	3,741,986	36,457	3,393,999	70	33,567	314,420	389	229	
11	32,800	3,774,786	24,444	3,418,443	76	33,643	322,700	380	231	
12	26,250	3,801,036	25,089	3,443,532	77	33,720	323,784	367	211	
13	22,535	3,823,571	25,356	3,468,888	87	33,807	320,876	384	222	
14	22,030	3,845,601	33,872	3,502,760	92	33,899	308,942	388	215	
15	26,534	3,872,135	31,234	3,533,994	95	33,994	304,147	376	222	
16	28,298	3,900,433	33,009	3,567,003	105	34,099	299,331	374	233	
17	27,004	3,927,437	29,450	3,596,453	85	34,185	296,799	373	225	
18	24,241	3,951,678	26,615	3,623,068	59	34,244	294,366	383	222	
19	11,091	3,974,019	33,347	3,656,415	85	34,329	283,275	390	219	
20	19,105	3,993,124	28,250	3,684,665	71	34,400	274,059	371	203	
21	17,828	4,010,952	28,003	3,712,668	63	34,463	263,821	358	199	
22	21,483	4,032,435	32,561	3,745,229	73	34,535	252,671	339	209	
23	22,491	4,054,926	26,234	3,771,463	63	34,60	248,863	332	189	
24	24,316	4,079,242	25,212	3,796,975	64	34,664	-	-	-	
25	21,787	4,101,081	0	3,796,975	52	34,717	269,389	291	181	
26	20,923	4,122,004	25,467	3,844,766	34	34,751	242,487	302	198	
27	16,863	4,138,867	26,171	3,870,937	37	34,751	233,179	299	187	
28	13,336	4,152,203	25,552	3,896,489	54	34,842	220,872	288	185	
29	15,215	4,167,418	24,154	3,920,643	64	34,906	211,869	282	176	
30	15,941	4,183,359	21,186	3,941,829	33	34,939	206,591	275	168	
31	18,560	4,201,919	18,252	3,960,082	44	34,983	206,854	267	164	

On 15 March, Malaysia allowed fully vaccinated travellers from Thailand and Cambodia to enter the country without having to undergo quarantine.

On 16 March, Malaysia reported its first case of the BA5.2 variant of the SARS-CoV-2 Omicron variant.

On 21 March, the total number of cases exceeded the 4 million mark, reaching 4,010,952.

=== April ===
Date	Cases		Recoveries		Deaths		Current cases			Sources
Date	New	Total	New	Total	New	Total	Active	ICU	Ventilators	Sources
1	17,416	4,219,395	17,321	3,977,403	30	35,013	206,979	263	162	
2	14,692	4,234,087	20,383	3,997,786	56	35,069	201,232	261	153	
3	12,380	4,246,467	20,635	4,018,421	30	35,099	192,947	253	157	
4	10,002	4,256,469	23,302	4,041,723	28	35,127	179,619	236	140	
5	12,017	4,268,486	20,431	4,062,154	33	35,160	171,172	234	131	
6	12,105	4,280,591	21,029	4,083,183	32	35,192	162,216	221	122	
7	11,994	4,292,585	16,603	4,099,786	36	35,228	157,571	197	108	
8	14,944	4,307,529	14,045	4,113,831	31	35,259	158,439	206	109	
9	10,177	4,317,706	15,132	4,128,963	21	35,280	153,463	195	108	
10	8,112	4,325,818	15,765	4,144,728	12	35,292	145,798	174	110	
11	7,739	4,333,557	19,049	4,163,777	19	35,311	134,469	174	102	
12	9,002	4,342,559	16,986	4,180,763	30	35,341	126,455	151	97	
13	10,052	4,352,611	15,893	4,196,656	22	35,363	120,592	161	99	
14	10,413	4,363,024	13,202	4,209,858	18	35,381	117,785	154	89	
15	9,673	4,372,697	14,267	4,224,125	16	35,397	113,175	152	87	
16	9,705	4,382,402	14,436	4,238,471	12	35,409	108,522	134	81	
17	6,623	4,389,025	11,233	4,249,704	12	35,421	103,900	126	76	
18	7,140	4,396,165	14,423	4,264,127	16	35,437	96,601	110	68	
19	6,069	4,402,234	10,619	4,274,746	12	35,449	92,039	97	64	
20	6,968	4,409,202	8,267	4,283,013	16	35,465	90,724	97	63	
21	5,899	4,415,101	8,434	4,291,447	5	35,470	88,184	92	61	
22	6,342	4,421,443	9,111	4,300,558	12	35,482	85,403	91	61	
23	5,624	4,427,067	10,041	4,310,599	9	35,491	80,977	89	57	
24	4,006	4,431,073	10,223	4,320,822	8	35,499	74,752	98	61	
25	2,478	4,433,551	9,215	4,330,037	8	35,507	68,007	98	63	
26	3,361	4,436,912	9,484	4,339,521	13	35,520	61,871	101	63	
27	3,471	4,440,383	6,900	4,346,421	6	35,526	58,436	98	63	
28	2,935	4,443,318	7,585	4,354,006	10	35,536	53,776	84	56	
29	2,579	4,445,897	6,055	4,360,061	6	35,542	50,294	78	50	
30	2,107	4,448,004	6,890	4,366,951	5	35,547	45,506	69	45	

From 1 April, Malaysia allowed quarantine-free travel for fully-vaccinated travellers, ending two years of COVID-19 border restrictions. That same day, testing and isolation requirements for travellers on private transports were eased at the Malaysia-Singapore border.

On 3 April, the total number of recoveries exceeded the 4 million threshold, reaching 4,018,421.

=== May ===
Date	Cases		Recoveries		Deaths		Current cases			Sources
Date	New	Total	New	Total	New	Total	Active	ICU	Ventilators	Sources
1	1,503	4,449,507	5,839	4,372,790	3	35,550	41,167	69	45	
2	1,352	4,450,859	6,074	4,378,864	5	35,555	36,440	66	44	
3	922	4,451,781	5,520	4,384,384	9	35,564	31,833	69	46	
4	1,054	4,452,835	4,107	4,388,491	3	35,567	28,777	74	41	
5	1,278	4,454,113	2,599	4,391,090	2	35,569	27,454	66	36	
6	1,251	4,455,364	3,181	4,394,271	7	35,576	25,517	76	39	
7	1,372	4,456,736	3,610	4,397,881	3	35,579	23,276	86	46	
8	2,153	4,458,889	2,869	4,400,750	4	35,583	22,556	88	59	
9	2,246	4,461,135	2,433	4,403,183	1	35,584	22,368	69	39	
10	2,605	4,463,740	2,014	4,405,197	6	35,590	21,612	67	38	
11	3,321	4,467,061	1,416	4,406,613	8	35,598	24,850	59	34	
12	3,410	4,470,471	1,430	4,408,043	4	35,602	26,826	51	34	
13	3,029	4,473,500	1,116	4,409,159	5	35,607	28,734	33	9	
14	2,373	4,475,873	1,340	4,410,499	5	35,612	29,762	47	31	
15	2,239	4,478,112	1,263	4,411,762	3	35,615	30,735	45	23	
16	1,697	4,479,809	1,548	4,413,310	5	35,620	30,879	40	22	
17	1,469	4,481,278	1,836	4,415,146	3	35,623	30,509	36	17	
18	2,017	4,483,295	2,548	4,417,694	7	35,630	29,971	38	20	
19	2,124	4,485,419	2,303	4,419,997	3	35,633	29,789	35	22	
20	2,063	4,487,482	2,618	4,422,615	5	35,638	29,229	36	20	
21	2,021	4,489,503	3,162	4,425,777	3	35,641	28,085	39	24	
22	1,817	4,491,320	3,389	4,429,166	2	35,643	26,511	40	23	
23	1,544	4,492,864	2,905	4,432,071	2	35,645	25,148	39	25	
24	1,918	4,494,782	2,124	4,434,195	2	35,647	24,940	32	19	
25	2,430	4,497,212	2,192	4,436,387	6	35,653	25,172	31	18	
26	1,845	4,499,057	1,825	4,438,212	3	35,656	25,189	27	18	
27	1,877	4,500,934	1,680	4,439,892	2	35,658	25,384	30	18	
28	1,645	4,502,579	1,809	4,441,701	2	35,660	25,218	34	17	
29	1,155	4,503,734	1,975	4,443,676	5	35,665	24,393	34	18	
30	1,325	4,505,059	1,935	4,445,611	4	35,669	23,779	32	15	
31	1,451	4,506,510	2,071	4,447,682	7	35,676	23,152	38	15	

From 1 May, the Malaysian Government eliminated pre-flight and on-arrival testing requirements for fully vaccinated travellers and those who have just recovered from COVID-19. While the Government lifted mask requirements for outdoor settings, they remained mandatory for indoor activities and public transport. In addition, unvaccinated individuals without COVID-19 symptoms were allowed to enter premises without using the MySejahtera app.

=== June ===
Date	Cases		Recoveries		Deaths		Current cases			Sources
Date	New	Total	New	Total	New	Total	Active	ICU	Ventilators	Sources
1	1,809	4,508,319	1,911	4,449,593	2	35,678	23,048	26	16	
2	1,877	4,510,196	1,715	4,451,308	2	35,680	23,208	29	17	
3	1,844	4,512,040	2,005	4,453,313	1	35,681	23,046	27	17	
4	1,591	4,513,631	2,185	4,455,498	5	35,686	22,447	27	17	
5	1,358	4,514,989	1,620	4,514,989	2	35,688	22,183	26	12	
6	1,330	4,516,319	1,881	4,458,999	2	35,690	20,659	22	11	
7	1,128	4,517,447	1,547	4,460,546	9	35,699	21,202	25	12	
8	1,518	4,518,965	1,125	4,461,671	6	35,705	21,589	26	14	
9	1,887	4,520,852	1,399	4,463,070	3	35,708	22,074	25	17	
10	2,166	4,523,018	1,488	4,464,558	1	35,709	22,571	24	13	
11	1,709	4,524,727	1,746	4,466,304	2	35,711	22,712	24	14	
12	1,571	4,526,298	1,887	4,468,191	1	35,712	22,395	26	15	
13	2,092	4,528,390	1,876	4,470,067	4	35,716	22,607	24	12	
14	1,922	4,530,312	1,564	4,471,631	4	35,720	22,961	32	18	
15	2,320	4,532,632	1,390	4,473,021	5	35,725	23,886	38	22	
16	2,033	4,534,665	1,337	4,474,358	5	35,730	24,577	32	18	
17	2,130	4,536,795	1,080	4,475,438	1	35,371	25,626	35	19	
18	2,127	4,538,922	1,390	4,476,828	1	35,732	26,362	23	16	
19	1,690	4,540,612	2,108	4,478,936	0	35,732	25,944	23	15	
20	2,093	4,542,705	2,082	4,481,018	3	35,735	25,952	23	18	
21	1,921	4,544,626	1,716	4,482,734	2	35,737	26,155	29	20	
22	2,425	4,547,051	1,550	4,484,284	4	35,741	27,026	30	16	
23	2,796	4,549,847	2,503	4,486,787	1	35,742	27,318	38	21	
24	2,512	4,552,359	1,580	4,488,367	3	35,745	28,247	34	21	
25	2,302	4,554,661	2,539	4,490,906	0	35,745	28,010	31	18	
26	2,003	4,556,664	1,861	4,492,767	1	35,746	28,151	31	19	
27	1,894	4,558,558	1,944	4,494,711	8	35,754	28,093	34	20	
28	2,025	4,560,583	2,367	4,497,078	4	35,758	27,747	37	19	
29	2,605	4,563,188	1,633	4,498,711	5	35,673	28714	40	24	
30	2,867	4,566,055	2,145	4,500,856	2	35,765	29,434	43	25	

On 13 June, the Health Ministry's COVIDNow portal reported that the number of recoveries had outpaced new infections for a second day in a row; with 1,887 individuals recovering from COVID-19 on that day.

On 18 June, the Malaysian and Indian governments agreed to recognise each other's COVID-19 vaccination certificates.

=== July ===
Date	Cases		Recoveries		Deaths		Current cases			Sources
Date	New	Total	New	Total	New	Total	Active	ICU	Ventilators	Sources
1	2,773	4,568,828	1,984	4,502,840	6	35,771	30,217	47	28	
2	2,527	4,571,355	2,359	4,505,199	0	35,771	30,385	43	22	
3	2,536	4,573,891	3,123	4,508,322	5	35,776	29,793	45	26	
4	1,918	4,575,809	2,321	4,510,643	8	35,784	29,382	44	24	
5	2,932	4,578,741	2,292	4,512,935	3	35,787	30,019	42	25	
6	3,561	4,582,302	2,035	4,514,970	5	35,792	31,540	40	23	
7	4,020	4,586,322	1,718	4,516,688	3	35,795	33,839	45	23	
8	3,589	4,589,911	2,224	4,518,912	6	35,801	35,198	42	25	
9	2,799	4,592,710	2,666	4,521,578	8	35,809	35,323	41	26	
10	3,264	4,595,974	2,703	4,524,281	2	35,811	35,882	43	26	
11	2,417	4,598,391	2,536	4,526,817	5	35,816	35,758	48	25	
12	2,345	4,600,736	2,384	4,529,201	3	35,819	35,716	52	31	
13	3,934	4,604,670	2,747	4,531,948	9	35,828	36,894	53	30	
14	4,098	4,608,768	2,071	4,534,019	8	35,836	38,913	53	35	
15	5,230	4,613,998	2,297	4,536,946	8	35,844	41,208	64	44	
16	5,047	4,619,045	3,770	4,540,716	4	35,848	42,481	60	34	
17	3,936	4,622,981	3,899	4,544,615	7	35,855	42,511	61	38	
18	3,080	4,626,061	3,399	4,548,014	7	35,862	42,185	57	37	
19	3,902	4,629,963	2,935	4,550,949	8	35,870	43,144	55	39	
20	5,685	4,635,648	3,337	4,554,286	8	35,878	45,484	56	35	
21	4,587	4,640,235	2,652	4,556,938	10	35,888	47,409	63	32	
22	3,880	4,644,115	2,607	4,559,545	14	35,902	48,668	50	28	
23	4,816	4,648,931	3,928	4,563,473	9	35,911	49,547	49	28	
24	2,720	4,651,651	4,012	4,567,485	3	35,914	48,252	54	32	
25	3,300	4,654,951	5,227	4,572,712	9	35,923	46,316	51	28	
26	4,759	4,659,710	4,806	4,577,518	9	35,932	46,260	52	28	
27	4,503	4,664,213	3,847	4,581,365	10	35,942	46,906	59	30	
28	3,926	4,668,139	3,542	4,584,907	4	35,946	47,286	60	35	
29	4,860	4,672,999	3,836	4,588,743	10	35,956	48,300	60	34	
30	4,271	4,677,270	5,553	4,594,296	4	35,960	47,014	62	34	
31	2,783	4,680,053	4,482	4,598,778	9	35,969	45,306	54	32	

By 30 July, there were 47,014 active cases with 96.8% in home quarantine and 19 being treated at quarantine centres. In addition, three percent of patients (1,446) were being treated at hospital, with 62 in intensive care and 34 on ventilator support.

=== August ===
Date	Cases		Recoveries		Deaths		Current cases			Sources
Date	New	Total	New	Total	New	Total	Active	ICU	Ventilators	Sources
1	3,213	4,683,266	3,847	4,602,625	8	35,977	44,664	54	33	
2	4,204	4,687,470	4,582	4,607,207	8	35,985	44,278	56	36	
3	5,330	4,692,800	3,075	4,610,282	10	35,995	46,253	49	34	
4	4,413	4,697,213	3,394	4,613,676	3	36,003	47,534	52	32	
5	3,927	4,701,140	4,949	4,618,625	6	36,009	46,506	52	38	
6	4,684	4,705,824	4,275	4,622,900	11	36,020	46,904	56	35	
7	2,728	4,708,552	3,856	4,626,756	6	36,026	45,770	52	36	
8	2,863	4,711,415	4,752	4,631,508	6	36,032	43,875	55	38	
9	3,083	4,714,498	4,229	4,635,737	12	36,044	42,717	62	35	
10	4,896	4,719,394	2,979	4,638,716	12	36,056	44,622	68	37	
11	4,831	4,724,225	3,362	4,642,078	10	36,066	46,081	60	40	
12	3,943	4,728,168	4,645	4,646,723	4	36,070	45,375	66	45	
13	4,334	4,732,502	5,082	4,651,805	10	36,080	44,617	68	44	
14	3,045	4,735,547	4,226	4,656,031	5	36,085	43,431	72	46	
15	2,437	4,737,984	3,658	4,659,688	8	36,093	42,203	81	50	
16	3,429	4,741,413	4,882	4,664,570	9	36,102	40,741	84	58	
17	3,516	4,744,929	2,541	4,667,111	15	36,117	41,701	92	49	
18	4,071	4,749,000	3,289	4,670,400	7	36,124	42,476	81	45	
19	3,490	4,752,490	3,193	4,673,593	6	36,130	42,767	75	30	
20	2,798	4,755,288	4,669	4,678,262	6	36,136	40,890	65	39	
21	2,464	4,757,752	4,427	4,682,689	9	36,145	38,918	69	33	
22	2,078	4,759,830	3,290	4,685,979	10	36,155	37,696	69	39	
23	2,722	4,762,552	4,856	4,690,835	11	36,166	35,551	68	41	
24	2,636	4,765,188	3,206	4,694,041	11	36,177	34,970	67	36	
25	3,206	4,768,394	2,180	4,696,221	8	36,185	35,988	69	42	
26	3,118	4,771,512	3,363	4,699,584	6	36,191	35,737	75	45	
27	2,491	4,774,003	3,715	4,703,299	5	36,196	34,508	72	49	
28	2,191	4,776,194	3,796	4,707,095	2	36,198	32,901	73	48	
29	1,946	4,778,140	3,271	4,710,366	8	36,206	31,568	75	50	
30	2,144	4,780,284	2,549	4,712,915	4	36,210	31,159	72	50	
31	2,340	4,782,624	2,502	4,715,417	6	36,216	30,991	69	42	

On 1 August, the Malaysian Government allowed all travelers to enter Malaysia regardless of vaccination status and eliminated pre-departure and on-arrival COVID-19 test requirements.

On 21 August, Malaysia reported its first case of the BF.7 variant of the Omicron variant of COVID-19.

=== September ===
Date	Cases		Recoveries		Deaths		Current cases			Sources
Date	New	Total	New	Total	New	Total	Active	ICU	Ventilators	Sources
1	2,356	4,784,980	1,875	4,717,292	9	36,225	31,463	74	46	
2	2,328	4,787,308	2,618	4,719,910	9	36,234	31,164	79	44	
3	2,244	4,789,552	3,202	4,723,112	9	36,243	30,197	75	40	
4	1,904	4,791,456	3,138	4,726,250	2	36,245	28,961	73	36	
5	1,486	4,792,942	2,897	4,729,147	4	36,249	27,546	79	43	
6	2,067	4,795,009	2,279	4,731,426	6	36,255	27,328	69	40	
7	2,428	4,797,437	2,673	4,734,099	7	36,262	27,076	67	38	
8	2,226	4,799,663	1,894	4,735,993	8	36,270	27,400	64	38	
9	1,990	4,801,653	2,016	4,738,009	4	36,274	27,370	67	46	
10	1,971	4,803,624	2,389	4,740,398	3	36,277	26,949	69	49	
11	1,483	4,805,107	2,090	4,742,488	3	36,280	26,339	68	48	
12	1,847	4,806,954	2,148	4,744,636	5	36,285	26,033	67	45	
13	1,942	4,808,896	2,276	4,746,912	6	36,291	25,693	62	39	
14	2,431	4,811,327	1,820	4,748,732	5	36,296	26,299	62	40	
15	2,375	4,813,702	1,466	4,750,198	3	36,299	27,205	53	41	
16	1,977	4,815,679	2,018	4,752,216	6	36,305	27,158	60	41	
17	1,572	4,817,251	2,695	4,754,911	3	36,308	26,032	60	37	
18	1,639	4,818,890	2,056	4,756,967	4	36,312	25,611	60	39	
19	1,307	4,820,197	1,830	4,758,797	5	36,317	25,083	55	36	
20	1,667	4,821,864	2,028	4,760,825	7	36,324	24,715	59	37	
21	2,111	4,823,975	1,493	4,762,318	6	36,330	25,327	57	37	
22	2,245	4,826,220	1,901	4,764,219	12	36,342	25,659	55	35	
23	2,070	4,828,290	2,009	4,766,228	3	36,345	25,717	54	33	
24	1,924	4,830,214	2,360	4,768,588	3	36,348	25,278	51	28	
25	1,608	4,831,822	2,352	4,770,940	2	36,350	24,532	51	29	
26	1,186	4,833,008	1,690	4,772,630	7	36,357	24,021	52	35	
27	1,552	4,834,560	1,684	4,774,314	6	36,363	23,883	46	26	
28	2,445	4,837,005	1,613	4,775,927	2	36,365	24,713	41	22	
29	1,867	4,838,872	1,402	4,777,329	4	36,369	25,174	43	24	
30	2,007	4,840,879	1,407	4,778,736	5	36,374	25,769	42	19	

=== October ===
Date	Cases		Recoveries		Deaths		Current cases			Sources
Date	New	Total	New	Total	New	Total	Active	ICU	Ventilators	Sources
1	-	-	-	-	-	-	-	-	-	
2	1,360	4,843,865	2,271	4,783,393	1	36,375	24,097	45	28	
3	1,244	4,845,109	2,005	4,785,398	5	36,380	23,331	46	25	
4	1,483	4,846,592	1,852	4,787,250	5	36,385	22,957	42	23	
5	1,722	4,848,314	1,639	4,788,889	2	36,387	23,038	48	26	
6	1,794	4,850,108	1,227	4,790,116	4	36,391	23,601	36	24	
7	1,788	4,851,896	1,509	4,791,625	3	36,394	23,837	38	24	
8	1,627	4,853,523	2,379	4,794,004	4	36,398	23,121	43	27	
9	1,453	4,854,976	1,800	4,795,804	2	36,400	22,722	37	22	
10	1,241	4,856,217	1,843	4,797,647	3	36,403	22,167	38	25	
11	1,291	4,857,508	1,592	4,799,239	3	36,406	21,863	46	22	
12	1,628	4,859,136	1,345	4,800,584	1	36,407	22,145	41	20	
13	2,090	4,861,226	1,428	4,802,012	3	36,410	22,804	33	16	
14	2,231	4,863,457	1,473	4,803,485	5	36,415	23,557	34	21	
15	2,023	4,865,480	1,699	4,805,184	0	36,415	23,881	34	20	
16	1,712	4,867,192	1,699	4,806,883	2	36,417	22,854	36	19	
17	1,210	4,868,402	2,026	4,808,909	6	36,423	23,070	43	19	
18	1,873	4,870,275	1,515	4,810,424	3	36,426	23,425	43	12	
19	2,295	4,872,570	1,386	4,811,810	3	36,429	24,331	44	11	
20	2,561	4,875,131	1,248	4,813,058	8	36,437	25,636	51	23	
21	2,256	4,877,387	1,363	4,814,421	3	36,440	26,526	47	17	
22	2,618	4,880,005	1,841	4,816,262	4	36,444	27,299	47	18	
23	2,054	4,882,059	1,975	4,818,237	0	36,444	27,378	43	16	
24	1,737	4,883,796	2,118	4,820,355	3	36,447	26,994	52	19	
25	1,743	4,885,539	1,935	4,822,290	5	36,452	26,797	44	23	
26	2,136	4,887,675	1,695	4,823,984	6	36,458	27,233	48	27	
27	2,762	4,890,437	1,271	4,825,255	4	36,462	28,720	47	30	
28	3,296	4,893,733	1,960	4,827,215	1	36,463	30,055	58	35	
29	3,189	4,896,922	2,541	4,829,756	1	36,464	30,702	60	34	
30	3,129	4,900,051	2,464	4,832,220	2	36,466	31,365	66	39	
31	2,913	4,902,964	2,833	4,835,053	9	36,475	31,436	56	3	

On 6 October, the Ministry of Health retired the COVIDNOW website, with COVID-19 daily reports being transferred to the KKMNOW website, which is jointly run by the Health Ministry and the Department of Statistics.

=== November ===
Date	Cases		Recoveries		Deaths		Current cases			Sources
Date	New	Total	New	Total	New	Total	Active	ICU	Ventilators	Sources
1	2,913	4,905,877	2,599	4,837,652	3	36,478	31,747	60	43	
2	3,969	4,909,846	2,696	4,840,348	2	36,480	33,018	63	47	
3	4,711	4,914,557	3,120	4,843,468	0	36,480	34,609	67	47	
4	4,360	4,918,917	3,429	4,846,897	1	36,481	35,539	73	53	
5	4,621	4,923,538	3,577	4,850,474	1	36,482	36,582	70	50	
6	3,913	4,927,451	3,774	4,854,248	5	36,487	36,716	67	50	
7	2,521	4,929,972	4,695	4,858,943	8	36,495	34,534	73	47	
8	3,781	4,933,753	2,979	4,861,792	9	36,504	35,457	75	47	
9	3,267	4,937,020	4,026	4,865,677	10	36,514	34,829	91	63	
10	3,436	4,940,456	4,292	4,869,969	8	36,522	33,965	92	60	
11	3,245	4,943,701	4,208	4,874,177	15	36,537	32,987	87	63	
12	2,882	4,946,583	4,730	4,878,828	9	36,546	31,209	84	62	
13	2,234	4,948,817	3,836	4,882,664	2	36,548	29,605	91	57	
14	1,749	4,950,566	2,564	4,885,228	6	36,554	28,784	89	54	
15	2,852	4,953,418	3,710	4,888,938	12	36,566	27,914	97	57	
16	3,304	4,956,722	3,045	4,891,983	8	36,574	28,165	90	49	
17	3,457	4,960,179	3,736	4,895,719	9	36,583	27,877	89	46	
18	3,037	4,963,216	3,198	4,898,917	5	36,588	27,711	106	53	
19	2,450	4,965,666	3,000	4,901,917	5	36,593	27,156	91	63	
20	1,633	4,967,299	1,989	4,903,906	2	36,595	26,798	94	55	
21	2,121	4,969,420	1,764	4,905,670	14	36,609	27,141	92	58	
22	2,516	4,971,936	2,643	4,908,313	11	36,620	27,003	93	59	
23	3,537	4,975,473	3,319	4,911,632	8	36,628	27,213	101	61	
24	2,877	4,978,350	3,226	4,914,858	8	36,636	26,856	97	62	
25	3,024	4,981,374	2,969	4,917,827	8	36,644	26,903	92	52	
26	2,898	4,984,272	2,789	4,920,616	4	36,648	27,008	97	57	
27	2,022	4,986,294	1,819	4,922,435	4	36,652	27,207	101	53	
28	2,465	4,988,759	2,029	4,924,464	5	36,657	27,638	92	51	
29	1,672	4,990,431	2,722	4,927,186	10	36,667	26,578	94	52	
30	1,737	4,992,168	3,338	4,930,524	17	36,684	24,960	94	57	

By 26 November, the Sarawak state government confirmed that 86% of the state's population (roughly 2,430,627 people) have been fully vaccinated with two doses. In addition, 73% of eligible people aged 12 and above (roughly 1,584,620 people) had received the first booster dose. However, only 2% of the eligible population (roughly 51,372 people) had received the second booster dose.

On 30 November, Sarawak Deputy Premier Datuk Seri Dr Sim Kui Hian confirmed that the previous four weeks of November 2023 had seen a progressive increase in COVID-19 transmissions. 1,046 cases were reported between 1,046 cases while 814 cases, 616 cases, and 459 cases were reported in the previous three weeks respectively. The overall number of COVID-19 cases reported in Sarawak declined from a total of 46,668 cases between January and March 2022 to 7,999 cases reported between August and November 2022.

=== December ===
Date	Cases		Recoveries		Deaths		Current cases			Sources
Date	New	Total	New	Total	New	Total	Active	ICU	Ventilators	Sources
1	2,375	4,994,543	2,857	4,933,381	11	36,695	24,467	91	57	
2	2,421	4,996,964	2,826	4,936,207	9	36,704	24,053	97	62	
3	1,866	4,998,830	2,814	4,939,021	6	36,710	23,099	102	69	
4	1,502	5,000,332	2,093	4,941,114	3	36,713	22,505	104	70	
5	1,576	5,001,908	2,278	4,943,392	3	36,716	21,800	98	69	
6	1,649	5,003,557	1,675	4,945,067	16	36,732	21,758	101	64	
7	1,682	5,005,239	1,428	4,946,495	6	36,738	22,006	91	58	
8	1,616	5,006,855	2,145	4,948,64	4	36,742	21,473	81	53	
9	1,597	5,008,452	2,596	4,951,236	6	36,748	20,468	86	54	
10	1,315	5,009,767	2,601	4,953,837	5	36,753	19,177	73	50	
11	867	5,010,634	1,313	4,955,150	10	36,763	18,721	78	50	
12	809	5,011,443	1,552	4,956,702	6	36,769	17,972	72	49	
13	1,040	5,012,483	1,456	4,958,158	9	36,778	17,547	69	52	
14	1,241	5,013,724	1,567	4,959,725	6	36,784	17,215	67	43	
15	1,161	5,014,885	1,562	4,961,287	3	36,787	16,811	68	34	
16	1,138	5,016,023	1,420	4,962,707	8	36,795	16,521	56	37	
17	993	5,017,016	1,460	4,964,167	5	36,800	16,049	53	29	
18	847	5,017,863	1,154	4,965,321	6	36,806	15,736	49	26	
19	721	5,018,584	914	4,966,235	2	36,808	15,541	44	23	
20	816	5,019,400	940	4,967,175	4	36,814	15,411	41	24	
21	984	5,020,384	1,534	4,968,709	7	36,821	14,854	37	22	
22	858	5,021,242	1,119	4,969,828	3	36,824	14,590	46	23	
23	902	5,022,144	1,104	4,970,932	6	36,830	14,382	42	31	
24	766	5,022,910	1,026	4,971,955	1	36,381	14,124	42	21	
25	609	5,023,519	737	4,972,691	0	36,381	13,997	43	19	
26	480	5,023,999	655	4,973,346	4	36,835	13,818	45	20	
27	423	5,024,422	834	4,974,180	6	36,841	13,401	43	19	
28	480	5,024,902	957	4,975,137	4	36,845	12,920	41	19	
29	679	5,025,581	923	4,976,060	6	36,851	12,670	34	21	
30	583	5,026,164	930	4,976,990	1	36,852	12,322	32	16	
31	513	5,026,677	833	4,977,822	1	36,853	12,002	33	15	

On 4 December, the total number of cases exceeded the five million mark, reaching 5,000,332.

On 5 December, Menteri Besar (Chief Minister) Datuk Seri Amirudin Shari estimated that the state of Selangor recorded six deaths on average per week, as well as between 1,000 and 2,000 new cases daily. Amirudin credited vaccination with reducing the state's 0.7% case-to-fatality ratio at the start of the COVID-19 pandemic to 0.1% at the start of the year.

On 13 December, Director-General Noor Hisham Abdullah confirmed that no COVID-19 cases had been detected among flood victims at relief centres since 19 November. He confirmed that 14 COVID-19 cases were detected at relief centres between 11 and 18 November but that the victims had completed their isolation and returned home.

On 27 December, Noor Hisham Abdullah announced that the Health Ministry would take steps to prepare for a possible surge in COVID-19 cases originating in China including boosting the country's vaccine booster rollout.
