= Timeline of the COVID-19 pandemic in Singapore =

Timeline of the COVID-19 pandemic in Singapore may refer to:

- Timeline of the COVID-19 pandemic in Singapore (2020)
- Timeline of the COVID-19 pandemic in Singapore (2021)
- Timeline of the COVID-19 pandemic in Singapore (2022)
- Timeline of the COVID-19 pandemic in Singapore (2023)
