= Timeline of the COVID-19 pandemic in Singapore (2021) =

The following is a timeline of the COVID-19 pandemic in Singapore in 2021.

== Timeline ==
=== January ===
Day	New cases				New recoveries	Active cases	In ICU	Total deaths	Total recovered	Total cases	Ref.
Day	Dorm Residents	Community	Imported	Total	New recoveries	Active cases	In ICU	Total deaths	Total recovered	Total cases	Ref.
1	-	3	27	30	10	141	1	29	58,459	58,629	
2	-	-	33	33	17	157	1	29	58,476	58,662	
3	-	-	35	35	11	181	1	29	58,487	58,697	
4	-	-	24	24	10	195	1	29	58,497	58,721	
5	-	2	26	28	20	203	1	29	58,517	58,749	
6	-	2	29	31	24	210	1	29	58,541	58,780	
7	-	2	31	33	21	222	1	29	58,562	58,813	
8	-	2	21	23	18	227	1	29	58,580	58,836	
9	-	-	29	29	31	225	1	29	58,611	58,865	
10	-	-	42	42	25	242	1	29	58,636	58,907	
11	-	-	22	22	32	232	1	29	58,668	58,929	
12	-	-	17	17	26	223	1	29	58,694	58,946	
13	1	-	37	38	28	233	1	29	58,722	58,984	
14	-	1	44	45	35	243	-	29	58,757	59,029	
15	-	1	29	30	14	259	-	29	58,771	59,059	
16	1	4	19	24	13	270	-	29	58,784	59,083	
17	-	2	28	30	62	238	-	29	58,846	59,113	
18	-	2	12	14	22	230	-	29	58,868	59,127	
19	-	4	26	30	26	234	-	29	58,894	59,157	
20	-	4	36	40	32	242	1	29	58,926	59,197	
21	-	4	34	38	33	247	1	29	58,959	59,235	
22	-	1	14	15	24	238	1	29	58,983	59,250	
23	-	-	10	10	32	216	-	29	59,015	59,260	
24	-	-	48	48	26	238	-	29	59,041	59,308	
25	-	-	44	44	25	257	-	29	59,066	59,352	
26	-	-	14	14	20	251	-	29	59,086	59,366	
27	-	-	25	25	18	258	-	29	59,104	59,391	
28	-	-	34	34	44	248	-	29	59,148	59,425	
29	-	-	24	24	33	239	-	29	59,181	59,449	
30	-	3	55	58	15	282	-	29	59,196	59,507	
31	-	-	29	29	32	279	-	29	59,228	59,536	

- 1 January: Following reports of a more contagious strain of COVID-19 circulating in South Africa, MOH announced that long-term pass holders and short-term visitors from South Africa, as well as those who have traveled there in the last 14 days (except for Singaporean citizens and permanent residents) would be barred from entering or transiting through Singapore from 4 January.
- 2 January:
  - Two employees in the marine sector who tested positive for COVID-19 in November and December 2020 were put under investigation for suspected breaching of safety measures, with one company, Master Systems Marine, being suspended from sending its personnel to work on board ships. Another company, Lloyd's Register Singapore, has suspended all shipboard survey and audit activities.
  - 44 people were put under investigation for suspected breaching of COVID-19 safety measures by gathering at an industrial building along Boon Lay Way on New Year's Day.
- 6 January: The Maritime and Port Authority (MPA) announced that the tanker NewOcean 6 would temporarily cease operations, following reports of 9 COVID-19 cases linked to it.
- 7 January: MOH announced that the Crowne Plaza Changi Airport Hotel would be closed until 21 January for investigation, following reports that the 2 unlinked community cases on that day were workers at the hotel.
- 8 January: Oh Bee Hiok, a COVID-19 case who was part of the SAFRA Jurong cluster in March 2020, was sentenced to five months' imprisonment for deliberately obstructing MOH workers and withholding information.
- 16 January: In the wake of the emergence of new COVID-19 variants and reports of the deteriorating global situation, MOH announced that all travelers from foreign countries – including Singaporean citizens and permanent residents – would be required from 24 January to take a PCR test upon arrival in Singapore. In addition, those who have traveled from the UK and South Africa will be required from 18 January to serve an extra 7-day self-isolation at their place of residence, after their 14-day stay-home notice (SHN) at dedicated facilities.
- 20 January: Following the recent increase of COVID-19 cases in the community, MHA and MTI announced that the planned pilot programme for reopening nightclubs and KTV lounges would be deferred until further notice.
- 21 January:
  - MINDEF announced the start of COVID-19 vaccinations for Singapore Armed Forces personnel, with plans to vaccinate the bulk of the active forces by mid-2021.
  - MTI announced that from 22 January, cargo drivers from Malaysia entering Singapore through the Tuas and Woodlands checkpoints will be required to take a COVID-19 test; only those with a negative result will be allowed entry.
- 22 January:
  - Nurul Afiqah Binte Mohammed was sentenced to 7 weeks' imprisonment for repeatedly leaving her home during her 14-day SHN.
  - MOH announced the tightening of COVID-19 safety measures ahead of the Chinese New Year period; from 26 January, households will be allowed only a maximum of 8 visitors per day, and that people – if possible – should not visit more than 2 households per day. In addition, conducting of the traditional "lohei" in restaurants should be done so without verbalisation of the auspicious phrases.
- 30 January: MFA announced that the reciprocal green lanes between Singapore and Malaysia, Germany and South Korea would be suspended for three months from 1 February, due to the resurgence of new COVID-19 cases in those countries. However, travelers who have already been approved under the green lane are still allowed to enter Singapore.
- 31 January: A 72-year old aviation officer who was among the 3 community cases on 30 January was put under investigation for meeting with 12 other people for tennis after developing COVID-19 symptoms.

=== February ===
Day	New cases				New recoveries	Active cases	In ICU	Total deaths	Total recovered	Total cases	Ref.
Day	Dorm Residents	Community	Imported	Total	New recoveries	Active cases	In ICU	Total deaths	Total recovered	Total cases	Ref.
1	-	-	29	29	43	265	-	29	59,271	59,565	
2	-	-	19	19	30	254	-	29	59,301	59,584	
3	-	-	18	18	19	253	-	29	59,320	59,602	
4	-	-	22	22	28	247	-	29	59,348	59,624	
5	1	1	23	25	25	247	1	29	59,373	59,649	
6	-	-	26	26	32	241	1	29	59,405	59,675	
7	-	1	23	24	28	237	1	29	59,433	59,699	
8	-	2	20	22	51	208	1	29	59,484	59,721	
9	-	-	11	11	22	197	1	29	59,506	59,732	
10	1	-	14	15	20	192	1	29	59,526	59,747	
11	-	3	9	12	32	172	1	29	59,558	59,759	
12	-	2	16	18	11	179	1	29	59,569	59,777	
13	-	-	9	9	35	153	1	29	59,604	59,786	
14	-	-	14	14	17	150	1	29	59,621	59,800	
15	-	-	9	9	20	139	1	29	59,641	59,809	
16	-	-	1	1	20	120	1	29	59,661	59,810	
17	-	1	10	11	15	116	1	29	59,676	59,821	
18	-	-	11	11	3	124	1	29	59,679	59,832	
19	-	-	14	14	18	120	1	29	59,697	59,846	
20	-	-	12	12	22	110	1	29	59,719	59,858	
21	-	-	11	11	12	109	1	29	59,731	59,869	
22	-	1	9	10	15	104	1	29	59,746	59,879	
23	1	-	3	4	7	101	1	29	59,753	59,883	
24	-	1	6	7	8	100	1	29	59,761	59,890	
25	-	2	8	10	24	86	1	29	59,785	59,900	
26	-	-	13	13	18	81	1	29	59,803	59,913	
27	-	-	12	12	13	80	1	29	59,816	59,925	
28	1	-	10	11	7	84	1	29	59,823	59,936	

- 1 February: Senior Minister of State for Health Janil Puthucheary announced that all polyclinics nationwide would begin offering COVID-19 vaccinations.
- 3 February:
  - MOM announced that from 5 February, foreign domestic workers and confinement nannies arriving in Singapore would be required to take a COVID-19 serology test. In addition, newly arrived work permit and S-pass holders who work in the construction, marine and process sectors would be required to go through an extra 7-day testing regime after their 14-day SHN.
  - HSA announced that the Moderna COVID-19 vaccine had been approved for use in Singapore, with the first shipment expected to arrive in March.
- 5 February: 10 people (9 British nationals and 1 Singaporean permanent resident) were charged in court for breaching COVID-19 safety measures by hosting a party on a yacht on 26 December 2020, during Phase 2 of reopening. In addition, MPA announced the suspension of the yacht for 30 days due to the incident.
- 6 February: The first case of COVID-19 re-infection in Singapore is reported, a Bangladeshi dorm resident who had first tested positive on 12 April 2020.
- 9 February: Following reports of the improving situation in New South Wales, Australia and the rising number of COVID-19 cases in Vietnam, MOH announced that travelers from New South Wales (from 11 February for Singaporean citizens, permanent residents and long-term pass holders, and 16 February for short-term visitors) would only be required to take a PCR test upon arrival instead of a serving a SHN. Meanwhile, travelers from Vietnam would be required from 13 February to serve a 14-day SHN upon arrival, with short-term visitors who have traveled to Vietnam in the past 14 days barred from entering. Travelers on the BTP Scheme would also be required to take additional COVID-19 tests upon their return to Singapore.
- 17 February: The first shipment of the Moderna COVID-19 vaccine arrives in Singapore.
- 23 February: The first shipment of China's CoronaVac COVID-19 vaccine arrives in Singapore, with HSA's authorisation for use pending.

=== March ===
Day	New cases			New recoveries	New deaths	Active cases	In ICU	Total deaths	Total recovered	Total cases	Ref.
Day	Community	Imported	Total	New recoveries	New deaths	Active cases	In ICU	Total deaths	Total recovered	Total cases	Ref.
1	-	12	12	7	-	89	1	29	59,830	59,948	
2	-	8	8	12	-	85	1	29	59,842	59,956	
3	2	21	23	7	-	101	1	29	59,849	59,979	
4	1	18	19	8	-	112	1	29	59,857	59,998	
5	-	9	9	13	-	108	1	29	59,870	60,007	
6	-	13	13	9	-	112	1	29	59,879	60,020	
7	-	13	13	15	-	110	1	29	59,894	60,033	
8	-	13	13	6	-	117	1	29	59,900	60,046	
9	-	6	6	5	-	118	1	29	59,905	60,052	
10	-	10	10	6	-	122	1	29	59,911	60,062	
11	1	7	8	28	-	102	1	29	59,939	60,070	
12	-	10	10	11	-	101	1	29	59,950	60,080	
13	-	8	8	11	1	97	-	30	59,961	60,088	
14	-	17	17	7	-	107	-	30	59,968	60,105	
15	-	12	12	6	-	113	-	30	59,974	60,117	
16	-	11	11	10	-	114	-	30	59,984	60,128	
17	-	9	9	17	-	106	-	30	60,001	60,137	
18	-	15	15	13	-	108	-	30	60,014	60,152	
19	-	15	15	5	-	118	-	30	60,019	60,167	
20	-	17	17	3	-	132	-	30	60,022	60,184	
21	-	12	12	16	-	128	-	30	60,038	60,196	
22	-	12	12	13	-	127	-	30	60,051	60,208	
23	-	13	13	12	-	128	-	30	60,063	60,221	
24	-	15	15	15	-	128	-	30	60,078	60,236	
25	-	17	17	8	-	137	-	30	60,086	60,253	
26	-	12	12	17	-	132	1	30	60,103	60,265	
27	-	23	23	10	-	145	1	30	60,113	60,288	
28	-	12	12	9	-	148	1	30	60,122	60,300	
29	-	21	21	9	-	160	1	30	60,131	60,321	
30	-	26	26	7	-	179	1	30	60,138	60,347	
31	-	34	34	11	-	202	1	30	60,149	60,381	

- 8 March:
  - MOH announced that COVID-19 vaccinations for people aged 60 to 69 would be brought forward from its initial planned date of end-March, due to an increase in vaccine stocks arriving in Singapore.
  - MOH announced that Singapore would offer COVID-19 vaccinations to cargo drivers from Malaysia, who will be selected based on their frequency of travel between the two countries.
- 11 March: Director of the International Air Transport Association (IATA) Alexandre de Juniac announced that overseas travel for personal and leisure purposes would resume from the second half of 2021.
- 15 March: MFA announced that Singapore was in discussions with Australia of a possible air travel bubble between the two countries.
- 18 March: MTI announced that cargo drivers and accompanying personnel from Malaysia would receive an immunization certificate upon completing their vaccination regimen, and would also be exempt from daily on-arrival tests.
- 24 March: MOH announced that from 5 April 2021, more people can return to work, as it will boost the central business district (CBD) and industrial park sector to 80%. Separately, pre-event testing will be carried out for any event larger than the original threshold, to the new threshold which was introduced in April. Guidelines were updated during the Phase 2 (Heightened Alert), Phase 3 (Heightened Alert) and now; Preparatory Stage of Transition to Endemic COVID-19.

=== April ===
Day	New cases				New recoveries	Active cases	In ICU	Total deaths	Total recovered	Total cases	Ref.
Day	Dorm Residents	Community	Imported	Total	New recoveries	Active cases	In ICU	Total deaths	Total recovered	Total cases	Ref.
1	-	-	26	26	12	216	1	30	60,161	60,407	
2	-	-	43	43	15	244	1	30	60,176	60,450	
3	-	-	18	18	9	253	1	30	60,185	60,468	
4	-	-	10	10	17	246	1	30	60,202	60,478	
5	-	-	17	17	12	251	1	30	60,214	60,495	
6	-	-	24	24	25	250	1	30	60,239	60,519	
7	-	1	34	35	21	264	1	30	60,260	60,554	
8	-	-	21	21	24	261	1	30	60,284	60,575	
9	-	-	26	26	20	267	1	30	60,304	60,601	
10	-	-	32	32	18	281	1	30	60,322	60,633	
11	1	-	19	20	13	288	1	30	60,335	60,653	
12	-	-	25	25	22	291	1	30	60,357	60,678	
13	-	-	14	14	17	288	1	30	60,374	60,692	
14	-	1	26	27	18	297	2	30	60,392	60,719	
15	-	-	16	16	25	288	2	30	60,417	60,735	
16	-	1	33	34	29	293	2	30	60,446	60,769	
17	-	4	35	39	17	315	2	30	60,463	60,808	
18	-	1	22	23	22	316	2	30	60,485	60,831	
19	-	1	19	20	18	318	1	30	60,503	60,851	
20	1	-	13	14	37	295	1	30	60,540	60,865	
21	-	-	15	15	36	274	1	30	60,576	60,880	
22	1	1	22	24	27	271	1	30	60,603	60,904	
23	1	-	38	39	10	300	1	30	60,613	60,943	
24	-	5	18	23	16	307	1	30	60,629	60,966	
25	-	-	40	40	33	314	1	30	60,662	61,006	
26	1	1	43	45	20	339	-	30	60,682	61,051	
27	-	1	11	12	22	329	-	30	60,704	61,063	
28	-	2	21	23	14	338	-	30	60,718	61,086	
Start of Delta variant
29	-	16	19	35	20	353	-	30	60,738	61,121	
30	-	8	16	24	13	364	-	30	60,751	61,145	

- 12 April: The Singapore Tourism Board (STB) announced that from 14 April, the 8-hour time limit for local tours would be removed, with the maximum number of participants increased from 20 to 50.
- 20 April: MOH announced that from 23 April, all travelers from India (except for Singaporean citizens and permanent residents) would be required to serve an additional 7-day SHN at their place of residence, after their 14-day SHN at dedicated facilities. Meanwhile, the SHN period for travelers from Hong Kong would be reduced from 14 days to 7, with the option of serving it at their place of residence. In addition, long-term pass holders and short-term visitors from the UK and South Africa would be reallowed entry into or transit through Singapore.
- 22 April:
  - MOH announced that from 1 June, only the TraceTogether app or token would be accepted for SafeEntry checking-in at all high-risk avenues (such as malls, workplaces, schools, and places of worship).
  - MOH announced that travelers from India who have not completed their 14-day SHN would now be required to serve their extra 7 days at dedicated facilities, instead of their place of residence. In addition, from 24 April, all long-term pass holders and short-term visitors with recent travel history to India in the past 14 days (including those who had gained prior approval for entry into Singapore) would be barred from entering or transiting through Singapore.
- 26 April: Singapore and Hong Kong announced that the air travel bubble between the two cities would officially re-launch on 26 May, with COVID-19 safety measures in place; daily flights are expected to begin in June.
- 29 April: Tan Tock Seng Hospital announced that no visitors would be allowed until further notice, after it was reported that a community case on that day was a fully-vaccinated nurse working at the hospital.
- 30 April: MOH announced that from 2 May, all long-term pass holders and short-term visitors with recent travel history to Bangladesh, Nepal, Pakistan and Sri Lanka in the past 14 days (including those who had gained prior approval for entry into Singapore) would be barred from entering or transiting through Singapore. Travelers from those countries who have yet to complete their 14-day SHN by 3 May would now be required to serve their extra 7 days at dedicated facilities. In addition, all travelers from Thailand would be required from 3 May onwards to serve their 14-day SHN at dedicated facilities.

=== May ===
Day	New cases				New recoveries	New deaths	Active cases	In ICU	Total deaths	Total recovered	Total cases	Ref.
Day	Dorm Residents	Community	Imported	Total	New recoveries	New deaths	Active cases	In ICU	Total deaths	Total recovered	Total cases	Ref.
1	2	7	25	34	14	1	383	-	31	60,765	61,179	
2	-	13	26	39	21	-	401	-	31	60,786	61,218	
3	-	10	7	17	20	-	398	-	31	60,806	61,235	
4	-	5	12	17	17	-	398	2	31	60,823	61,252	
5	-	1	15	16	21	-	393	2	31	60,844	61,268	
6	-	2	16	18	29	-	382	1	31	60,873	61,286	
7	-	4	21	25	33	-	374	2	31	60,906	61,311	
8	-	7	13	20	6	-	388	2	31	60,912	61,331	
9	-	10	18	28	21	-	395	2	31	60,933	61,359	
10	-	3	16	19	20	-	394	3	31	60,953	61,378	
11	-	13	12	25	22	-	397	3	31	60,975	61,403	
12	-	10	6	16	31	-	382	3	31	61,006	61,419	
13	-	24	10	34	23	-	393	3	31	61,029	61,453	
14	-	24	28	52	18	-	427	3	31	61,047	61,505	
15	-	19	12	31	15	-	443	3	31	61,062	61,536	
Start of Phase 2 (Heightened Alert)
16	-	38	11	49	42	-	450	2	31	61,104	61,585	
17	-	21	7	28	19	-	459	3	31	61,123	61,613	
18	-	27	11	38	11	-	486	5	31	61,134	61,651	
19	-	34	4	38	49	-	475	5	31	61,183	61,689	
20	-	27	14	41	46	1	469	4	32	61,229	61,730	
21	-	30	10	40	13	-	496	4	32	61,242	61,770	
22	-	22	7	29	35	-	490	5	32	61,277	61,799	
23	1	21	3	25	17	-	498	3	32	61,294	61,824	
24	-	24	12	36	22	-	512	3	32	61,316	61,860	
25	3	18	9	30	13	-	529	2	32	61,329	61,890	
26	1	23	2	26	31	-	524	2	32	61,360	61,916	
27	1	14	9	24	12	-	536	2	32	61,372	61,940	
28	-	15	15	30	35	-	531	3	32	61,407	61,970	
29	-	23	10	33	16	-	548	3	32	61,423	62,003	
30	-	19	6	25	11	1	561	3	33	61,434	62,028	
31	-	16	7	23	25	-	559	2	33	61,459	62,051	

- 4 May:
  - It was announced that travelers from all countries (except Australia, Brunei, China, New Zealand, Taiwan, Hong Kong and Macau) in the past consecutive 21 days would be required from 8 May onwards to serve a 21-day SHN at dedicated facilities upon arrival, though they will be allowed to serve the last 7 days at their place of residence.
  - MOH announced that Singapore would temporarily revert to Phase 2 from 8 to 30 May due to multiple virulent strains worldwide, with the possibility of enhanced penalties for not following the new rules, in order to prevent the need for a second "circuit breaker" or a full-blown lockdown.
  - MOH announced that the mandatory TraceTogether-only SafeEntry measures at higher-risk avenues would be brought forward from 1 June to 17 May.
- 7 May: MOM announced that effective immediately, Singapore would not accept entry applications for work pass holders from higher-risk countries and regions (including those who have received approval to enter Singapore before 5 July).
- 13 May: MOH announced that effective immediately, travelers from Vietnam in the past 21 days would be required to fully serve their 21-day SHN at dedicated facilities.
- 14 May: Following the recent surge of cases in the community, MOH announced that Singapore would enter Phase 2 (Heightened Alert) from 16 May to 13 June 2021.
- 16 May: MOH announced that all Singaporean citizens, permanent residents and long-term pass holders with recent travel history to Taiwan would be required from 17 May onwards to serve a 21-day SHN (14 days at dedicated facilities, followed by 7 days at their place of residence) upon arrival. In addition, all short-term visitors would be barred from entering or transiting through Singapore.
- 17 May:
  - MOT announced that the Singapore-Hong Kong air travel bubble would once again be deferred, with a new launch date to be reviewed around 13 June.
  - Tan Tock Seng Hospital announced that it would progressively resume admissions from 18 May.
- 18 May: MOH announced the authorization of the Pfizer-BioNTech COVID-19 vaccine for use on those aged 12 to 15, as well as the extension of the interval between doses from 3–4 weeks to 6–8 weeks.
- 20 May: Brunei announced that its "reciprocal green lane" arrangement with Singapore would be suspended until further notice.
- 24 May: HSA announced the provisional authorization of NUS's BreFrence Go COVID-19 breath test.
- 26 May: MOH announced that all travelers entering or transiting through Singapore (including Singaporean citizens and permanent residents) would be required from 30 May onwards to present a valid negative COVID-19 PCR test before their departure for and upon their arrival in Singapore; those with travel history to lower-risk countries in the past 21 days would be exempt.
- 27 May: MOH announced that all travelers from Victoria State, Australia (including Singaporean citizens, permanent residents, and long-term pass holders) would be required from 30 May onwards to serve a 7-day SHN at their place of residence, while short-term travelers would be barred from entering or transiting through Singapore.
- 31 May: It was announced that the mass vaccination exercise would begin on 1 June for all Singaporeans and permanent residents aged 12 and above, with ITE Colleges being opened for students to get vaccinated. In addition, remote work and home-based learning guidance would fully cease when herd immunity is achieved, while border restrictions and contact tracing would be retained to prevent dangerous variants from entering.

=== June ===
Day	New cases				New recoveries	New deaths	Active cases	In ICU	Total deaths	Total recovered	Total cases	Ref.
Day	Dorm Residents	Community	Imported	Total	New recoveries	New deaths	Active cases	In ICU	Total deaths	Total recovered	Total cases	Ref.
1	-	15	3	18	22	-	555	2	33	61,481	62,069	
2	-	24	7	31	42	-	544	2	33	61,523	62,100	
3	-	35	10	45	34	-	555	2	33	61,557	62,145	
4	-	7	6	13	23	-	545	2	33	61,580	62,158	
5	-	12	6	18	33	-	530	2	33	61,613	62,176	
6	-	6	14	20	22	-	528	2	33	61,635	62,196	
7	-	5	9	14	25	-	517	2	33	61,660	62,210	
8	1	3	5	9	42	1	483	2	34	61,702	62,219	
9	-	2	2	4	38	-	449	1	34	61,740	62,223	
10	-	4	9	13	25	-	437	1	34	61,765	62,236	
11	-	3	6	9	34	-	412	1	34	61,799	62,245	
12	-	9	9	18	39	-	391	1	34	61,838	62,263	
Move from Phase 2 (Heightened Alert) to Phase 3 (Heightened Alert)
13	-	10	3	13	31	-	373	1	34	61,869	62,276	
14	1	18	6	25	25	-	373	2	34	61,894	62,301	
15	-	14	-	14	17	-	370	2	34	61,911	62,315	
16	-	19	5	24	20	-	374	1	34	61,931	62,339	
17	-	20	7	27	29	-	372	1	34	61,960	62,366	
18	-	14	2	16	27	-	361	1	34	61,987	62,382	
19	-	14	7	21	36	-	346	1	34	62,023	62,403	
20	-	9	2	11	19	-	338	1	34	62,042	62,414	
21	-	13	3	16	28	1	325	-	35	62,070	62,430	
22	-	15	3	18	28	-	315	2	35	62,098	62,448	
23	-	13	9	22	15	-	322	5	35	62,113	62,470	
24	-	14	9	23	27	-	318	4	35	62,140	62,493	
25	-	15	5	20	21	-	317	4	35	62,161	62,513	
26	-	13	4	17	20	1	313	4	36	62,181	62,530	
27	-	12	2	14	14	-	313	4	36	62,195	62,544	
28	-	4	5	9	17	-	305	3	36	62,212	62,553	
29	-	5	5	10	7	-	308	3	36	62,219	62,563	
30	-	5	11	16	9	-	315	4	36	62,228	62,579	

- 2 June: MOH announced that China's CoronaVac COVID-19 vaccine would be approved for use in Singapore under the special access route, though it will not be covered under the Vaccine Injury Financial Assistance Programme.
- 4 June:
  - MOH announced that all travelers from Guangdong, China (including Singaporean citizens, permanent residents, and long-term pass holders) would be required from 5 June onwards to serve a 7-day SHN at their place of residence, while short-term travelers would be barred from entering or transiting through Singapore.
  - MOH announced that visits to all elderly care centers would be suspended from 5 to 20 June.
- 10 June: MOH announced that Singapore would move back to Phase 3 (Heightened Alert) in two steps on 14 June; the limit for social gatherings and distinct visitors allowed per household would be increased to 5, with the possibility of more restrictions being lifted (such as the resumption of dining-in) on 21 June.
- 14 June: MOH announced that effective immediately, all travelers from Fiji would be required to fully serve their 21-day SHN at dedicated facilities, while all travelers from Israel would be required from 16 June onwards to serve a 14-day SHN at dedicated facilities, followed by an additional 7 days at their place of residence.
- 18 June: MOH announced that dining-in and mask-off indoor fitness activities would resume on 21 June in groups of up to 2 people, with the possibility of the limit increasing to 5 in mid-July.
- 23 June: MOH announced that the duration of SHN at dedicated facilities for all new travelers from higher-risk countries and regions would be reduced from 21 days to 14 days from 24 June onwards, due to the lack of evidence proving that the emerging Variants of Concern possess longer incubation periods.
- 24 June:
  - Health Minister Ong Ye Kung announced that MOH had signed advanced purchase agreements with Novavax to procure its non-mRNA COVID-19 vaccine, with the possibility of the first shipment arriving before the end of the year.
  - MOH announced that from 27 June, Singaporean citizens, permanent residents and long-term pass holders traveling from New South Wales, Australia would be required to serve a 7-day SHN at their place of residence, with short-term pass holders barred from entering or transiting through Singapore. Meanwhile, all travelers from Victoria State would no longer be required to serve an SHN upon arrival.
- 29 June: It was announced that the interval between COVID-19 vaccination doses would be reduced from 6–8 weeks to 4 weeks.
- 30 June: MOH announced that from 3 July, all Singaporean citizens, permanent residents and long-term pass holders traveling from Australia would be required to serve a 7-day SHN at their place of residence, with short-term pass holders barred from entering or transiting through Singapore. Meanwhile, all travelers from Guangdong, China would no longer be required to serve an SHN upon arrival.

=== July ===
Day	New cases				New recoveries	New deaths	Active cases	In ICU	Total deaths	Total recovered	Total cases	Ref.
Day	Dorm Residents	Community	Imported	Total	New recoveries	New deaths	Active cases	In ICU	Total deaths	Total recovered	Total cases	Ref.
1	-	4	6	10	6	-	319	3	36	62,234	62,589	
2	-	3	7	10	16	-	313	2	36	62,250	62,599	
3	-	4	3	7	15	-	305	2	36	62,265	62,606	
4	-	1	10	11	21	-	295	2	36	62,286	62,617	
5	-	6	7	13	13	-	295	3	36	62,299	62,630	
6	1	1	8	10	14	-	291	3	36	62,313	62,640	
7	-	5	7	12	28	-	275	3	36	62,341	62,652	
8	-	3	13	16	22	-	269	2	36	62,363	62,668	
9	-	1	9	10	11	-	268	2	36	62,374	62,678	
10	-	-	6	6	23	-	251	2	36	62,397	62,684	
11	-	1	7	8	17	-	242	2	36	62,414	62,692	
12	-	8	18	26	18	-	250	2	36	62,432	62,718	
13	-	19	7	26	21	-	255	2	36	62,453	62,744	
14	-	56	4	60	14	-	301	1	36	62,467	62,804	
15	-	42	6	48	14	-	335	1	36	62,481	62,852	
16	-	53	8	61	17	-	379	1	36	62,498	62,913	
17	-	60	8	68	14	-	433	1	36	62,512	62,981	
18	1	87	4	92	14	-	511	1	36	62,526	63,073	
19	-	163	9	172	6	-	677	1	36	62,532	63,245	
20	-	182	13	195	11	-	861	1	36	62,543	63,440	
21	-	179	2	181	17	-	1,025	1	36	62,560	63,621	
Move from Phase 3 (Heightened Alert) to Phase 2 (Heightened Alert) till 9 August
22	2	160	8	170	16	-	1,179	1	36	62,576	63,791	
23	-	130	3	133	11	-	1,301	2	36	62,587	63,924	
24	1	126	3	130	8	1	1,422	1	37	62,595	64,054	
25	1	116	8	125	10	-	1,537	2	37	62,605	64,179	
26	1	128	6	135	12	-	1,660	2	37	62,617	64,314	
27	8	128	3	139	20	-	1,779	2	37	62,637	64,453	
28	3	127	6	136	26	-	1,889	2	37	62,663	64,589	
29	3	126	4	133	16	-	2,006	3	37	62,679	64,722	
30	4	127	8	139	54	-	2,091	7	37	62,733	64,861	
31	1	116	3	120	130	-	2,081	7	37	62,863	64,981	

- 7 July: It was announced that from 12 July, dining-in and social gatherings at the workplace in groups of up to 5 would resume, though remote work remains the default.
- 9 July: MOH announced that the interval between doses of the Pfizer-BioNTech COVID-19 vaccine would be further shortened to 3 weeks, as per the recommendation of the manufacturers.
- 10 July: MOH announced that from 13 July onwards, all travelers with travel history to Indonesia in the past 21 days (except Singaporean citizens and permanent residents) would be barred from transiting through Singapore. In addition, those entering Singapore would be required to present a negative PCR test taken 48 hours before departure.
- 14 July:
  - MOH announced that from 16 July onwards, all long-term pass holders and short-term visitors with travel history to Myanmar in the past 21 days would be barred from entering or transiting through Singapore.
  - MOH announced that all Singaporean citizens, permanent residents and long-term pass holders who have been inoculated against COVID-19 overseas (with vaccines either approved by the HSA or on WHO's Emergency Use Listing) would be able to update their vaccination records in the National Immunisation Registry upon their return to Singapore.
  - HSA announced that it would complete its evaluation of the CoronaVac COVID-19 Vaccine within 4 to 6 weeks, after having received additional data from Sinovac.
- 16 July: Following reports of the rising number of cases in the recent KTV cluster, MOH announced that all nightlife establishments that have pivoted to F&B establishments would be suspended from 16 to 30 July. In addition, the group limit for dining-in and mask-off activities would revert to 2 from 19 July to 8 August, though fully-vaccinated people may continue with the 5-people limit.
- 17 July: MOH announced that all fishmongers islandwide were to undergo testing for COVID-19, following reports of infected cases at Jurong Fishery Port on 16 July.
- 20 July: MOH announced that Singapore would revert to Phase 2 Heightened Alert from 22 July to 18 August.
- 28 July: It was announced that HSA had given the approval for the Sinopharm BIBP vaccine to be imported to and distributed in Singapore under the Special Access Route.
- 31 July: MOH announced that from 3 August, all travelers with travel history to Australia in the past 21 days would be required to serve a 14-day SHN at dedicated facilities, with the option to serve it at their place of residence; meanwhile, all travelers from Jiangsu Province, China, would be required to serve a 7-day SHN at their place of residence.

=== August ===
Day	New cases				New recoveries	New deaths	Active cases	In ICU	Total deaths	Total recovered	Total cases	Ref.
Day	Dorm Residents	Community	Imported	Total	New recoveries	New deaths	Active cases	In ICU	Total deaths	Total recovered	Total cases	Ref.
1	4	109	8	121	94	-	2,108	8	37	62,957	65,102	
2	4	102	5	111	76	1	2,142	7	38	63,033	65,213	
3	6	92	4	102	219	-	2,025	7	38	63,252	65,315	
4	6	86	3	95	105	1	2,014	7	39	63,357	65,410	
5	5	91	2	98	100	1	2,011	8	40	63,457	65,508	
6	18	75	4	97	79	1	2,028	7	41	63,536	65,605	
7	19	56	6	81	122	1	1,986	4	42	63,658	65,686	
8	4	69	5	78	200	-	1,864	8	42	63,858	65,764	
9	12	57	3	72	204	-	1,732	10	42	64,062	65,836	
Move from Phase 2 (Heightened Alert) to Preparatory Stage. For health and safety, several places are allowed to gather up to 5 pax and selected areas/unvaccinated are allowed to gather up to 2 pax
10	6	47	1	54	90	-	1,696	11	42	64,152	65,890	
11	8	53	2	63	141	1	1,617	8	43	64,293	65,953	
12	4	55	-	59	87	-	1,589	9	43	64,380	66,012	
13	2	43	4	49	157	1	1,480	10	44	64,537	66,061	
14	4	53	1	58	132	-	1,406	9	44	64,669	66,119	
15	4	46	3	53	123	-	1,336	8	44	64,792	66,172	
16	14	34	5	53	110	-	1,279	7	44	64,911	66,225	
17	14	38	4	56	160	1	1,174	6	45	65,062	66,281	
18	2	47	4	53	90	1	1,136	6	46	65,152	66,334	
19	-	29	3	32	90	-	1,078	8	46	65,242	66,366	
20	2	34	4	40	160	1	957	7	47	65,402	66,406	
21	-	32	5	37	126	-	868	7	47	65,528	66,443	
22	3	26	6	35	73	2	828	7	49	65,601	66,478	
23	60	34	4	98	99	1	826	7	50	65,700	66,576	
24	23	88	5	116	72	-	870	7	50	65,772	66,692	
25	26	92	2	120	53	2	935	7	52	65,825	66,812	
26	13	99	4	116	84	-	967	7	52	65,909	66,928	
27	7	113	2	122	59	3	1,027	6	55	65,968	67,050	
28	14	99	8	121	54	-	1,094	6	55	66,022	67,171	
29	15	109	9	133	70	-	1,157	6	55	66,092	67,304	
30	24	123	8	155	40	-	1,272	5	55	66,132	67,459	
31	20	136	5	161	42	-	1,391	5	55	66,174	67,620	

- 2 August: Senior Minister of State for Health Janil Puthucheary announced that those who have suffered allergic reactions after the first dose of an mRNA vaccine would be allowed to take the CoronaVac vaccine; they would also be considered fully-vaccinated.
- 4 August: MOH announced that barring several exceptions, all visits to hospital wards would be suspended from 5 to 18 August.
- 5 August: MOH announced that from 8 August, travellers from Taiwan would no longer be required to serve an SHN upon arrival.
- 6 August: MOH announced that from 10 August, the limit on social gatherings and visitors to households, as well as the resumption of dining-in at restaurants, would increase to 5 persons for fully-vaccinated people (while the limit remains 2 for non-vaccinated people and dining-in at hawker centres); from 19 August, limited number of employees currently working remotely would be allowed to return to the workplace due to rising number of cases; temperature screenings at public places would also no longer be required.
- 27 August: MOH announced that all households would each receive 6 DIY antigen rapid test (ART) kits from 28 August, with pre-school staff and students each receiving 3 kits from 13 September.
- 28 August: MOH announced that from 31 August, all travellers (including Singaporean citizens, permanent residents and long-term pass holders) with travel history to New Zealand in the past 21 days would be required to serve a 7-day SHN at their place of residence, with short term-travellers barred from entering or transiting through Singapore. Meanwhile, all travellers from Jiangsu Province, China, would no longer be required to serve an SHN upon arrival.

=== September ===
Day	New cases				New recoveries	New deaths	Active cases	In ICU	Total deaths	Total recovered	Total cases	Ref.
Day	Dorm Residents	Community	Imported	Total	New recoveries	New deaths	Active cases	In ICU	Total deaths	Total recovered	Total cases	Ref.
1	11	166	3	180	48	-	1,523	5	55	66,222	67,800	
2	11	177	3	191	90	-	1,624	5	55	66,312	67,991	
3	6	210	3	219	56	-	1,787	5	55	66,368	68,210	
4	7	246	6	259	144	-	1,902	5	55	66,512	68,469	
5	11	175	5	191	88	-	2,005	5	55	66,600	68,660	
6	20	215	6	241	119	-	2,127	6	55	66,719	68,901	
7	28	300	4	332	148	-	2,311	6	55	66,867	69,233	
From 8 September 2021, MOH will no longer report daily unlinked cases.
8	18	329	2	349	345	1	2,314	6	56	67,212	69,582	
9	31	419	7	457	221	1	2,549	7	57	67,433	70,039	
10	108	460	5	573	334	1	2,787	6	58	67,767	70,612	
11	64	486	5	555	221	-	3,121	7	58	67,988	71,167	
12	63	454	3	520	200	-	3,441	7	58	68,188	71,687	
13	63	534	10	607	247	-	3,801	8	58	68,435	72,294	
14	77	756	4	837	165	-	4,473	9	58	68,600	73,131	
15	34	770	3	807	277	-	5,003	9	58	68,877	73,938	
16	103	803	4	910	374	1	5,538	12	59	69,251	74,848	
17	96	838	1	935	363	-	6,110	14	59	69,614	75,783	
18	78	927	4	1,009	510	1	6,608	18	60	70,124	76,792	
19	90	920	2	1,012	476	-	7,144	21	60	70,600	77,804	
20	78	832	7	917	487	2	7,572	18	62	71,087	78,721	
21	135	1,039	4	1,178	541	3	7,572	17	65	71,628	79,899	
22	176	1,277	4	1,457	462	3	9,198	19	68	72,090	81,356	
23	273	1,219	12	1,504	321	2	10,379	23	70	72,411	82,860	
24	277	1,369	4	1,650	984	3	11,042	23	73	73,395	84,510	
25	371	1,053	19	1,443	740	3	11,742	27	76	74,135	85,953	
26	398	1,537	4	1,939	517	2	13,162	30	78	74,652	87,892	
27	362	1,280	5	1,647	524	2	14,283	27	80	75,176	89,539	
28	515	1,713	8	2,236	1,045	5	15,469	30	85	76,221	91,775	
29	448	1,811	9	2,258	1,086	8	16,643	34	93	77,307	94,043	
30	452	2,023	3	2,478	867	2	18,252	34	95	78,174	96,521	

- 9 September: MOM announced that from 13 September, all foreign workers who have been confined to dormitories for the past 18 months would gradually be allowed to visit the community, albeit under a strictly-controlled itinerary.
- 10 September: MOH announced that from 14 September, the quarantine period for those who have been exposed to COVID-19 (except for dormitory residents and travellers entering Singapore) would be reduced from 14 days to 10 days.
- 22 September: MOH announced that all visits to hospital wards would be suspended from 24 September to 23 October, though patient groups such as those requiring additional care support and birthing/post-partum mothers would be allowed one pre-designated visitor and one visit per day. Patients in critical condition would be allowed 5 visitors with a maximum of 2 at their bedside.
- 24 September: MOH announced that from 27 September, in-person gathering sizes would be cut back from 5 to 2 amid a rise in infections.

=== October ===
Day	New cases				New recoveries	New deaths	Active cases	In ICU	Total deaths	Total recovered	Total cases	Ref.
Day	Dorm Residents	Community	Imported	Total	New recoveries	New deaths	Active cases	In ICU	Total deaths	Total recovered	Total cases	Ref.
1	819	2,078	12	2,909	950	8	20,203	34	103	79,124	99,430	
2	412	1,938	6	2,356	1,603	4	20,952	31	107	80,727	101,786	
3	373	1,676	8	2,057	1,199	6	21,804	35	113	81,926	103,843	
4	601	1,859	15	2,475	2,540	8	21,731	35	121	84,466	106,318	
5	713	2,767	6	3,486	1,745	9	23,463	34	130	86,211	109,804	
6	630	2,932	15	3,577	2,899	3	24,138	37	133	89,110	113,381	
7	692	2,783	8	3,483	3,445	3	24,173	40	136	92,555	116,864	
8	765	2,825	-	3,590	2,454	6	25,303	41	142	95,009	120,454	
9	832	2,868	3	3,703	3,019	11	25,976	40	153	98,028	124,157	
10	631	2,176	2	2,809	2,469	9	26,307	41	162	100,497	126,966	
11	306	1,949	8	2,263	2,249	10	26,311	42	172	102,746	129,229	
12	251	2,721	4	2,976	2,110	11	27,166	42	183	104,856	132,205	
13	498	2,686	6	3,190	3,215	9	27,132	46	192	108,071	135,395	
14	517	2,412	3	2,932	3,427	15	26,622	46	207	111,498	138,327	
15	620	2,823	2	3,445	3,284	8	26,775	48	215	114,782	141,772	
16	656	2,688	4	3,348	3,429	9	26,685	62	224	118,211	145,120	
17	601	2,454	3	3,058	3,754	9	25,980	66	233	121,965	148,178	
18	544	2,008	1	2,553	3,071	6	25,456	67	239	125,036	150,731	
19	501	3,480	13	3,994	2,535	7	26,908	71	246	127,571	154,725	
20	630	3,221	11	3,862	2,715	18	28,037	67	264	130,286	158,587	
21	500	2,937	2	3,439	2,606	16	28,854	61	280	132,892	162,026	
22	592	3,039	6	3,637	2,825	14	29,652	57	294	135,717	165,663	
23	790	2,804	4	3,598	3,512	6	29,732	58	300	139,229	169,261	
24	667	2,708	8	3,383	3,369	15	29,731	58	315	142,598	172,644	
25	322	2,843	9	3,174	2,954	14	29,937	64	329	145,552	175,818	
26	288	2,984	5	3,277	2,856	10	30,348	67	339	148,408	179,095	
27	661	4,651	12	5,324	3,172	10	32,490	66	349	151,580	184,419	
28	252	3,171	9	3,432	4,348	15	31,559	61	364	155,928	187,851	
29	536	3,710	2	4,248	3,011	16	32,780	59	380	158,939	192,099	
30	500	2,608	4	3,112	3,912	14	31,966	60	394	162,851	195,211	
31	414	2,745	4	3,163	3,759	13	31,357	61	407	166,610	198,374	

- 9 October: MOH announced that from 13 October, non-vaccinated persons (except for those with a negative pre-event test result, recovered individuals, and children aged 12 and below) would be barred from entering shopping malls and dining-in at hawker centres/coffee shops.
- 20 October: MOH announced that restrictions on social gathering sizes to 2 people would be extended to 21 November 2021.
- 21 October: MOH announced that restrictions on visitors to hospitals and residential care homes would be extended to 21 November 2021.
- 23 October:
  - MOH announced that from 1 January 2022, in a bid to open up the economy, all non-vaccinated individuals would be barred from returning to the workplace, unless they have tested negative; those who are medically-ineligible for the vaccines would be exempt. As such, workplace restrictions can be eased only from 1 January 2022.
  - It was announced that Sinovac's Coronavac vaccine would be included in Singapore's national vaccination programme as a 3-dose regime, for those medically-ineligible for the mRNA-type vaccines.
  - MOH announced that from 27 October, individuals with travel history to Bangladesh, India, Myanmar, Nepal, Pakistan and Sri Lanka in the past 14 days would be allowed to enter or transit through Singapore.

=== November ===
Day	New cases				New recoveries	New deaths	Active cases	In ICU	Total deaths	Total recovered	Total cases	Ref.
Day	Dorm Residents	Community	Imported	Total	New recoveries	New deaths	Active cases	In ICU	Total deaths	Total recovered	Total cases	Ref.
1	278	2,189	3	2,470	3,552	14	30,261	62	421	170,162	200,844	
2	141	3,352	3	3,496	3,006	9	30,742	64	430	173,168	204,340	
3	409	3,223	3	3,635	3,340	12	31,025	69	442	176,508	207,975	
4	220	2,780	3	3,003	5,087	17	28,924	72	459	181,595	210,978	
5	120	1,639	8	1,767	3,657	9	27,025	70	468	185,252	212,745	
6	102	2,928	5	3,035	3,871	12	26,177	74	480	189,123	215,780	
7	205	2,343	5	2,553	2,926	17	25,787	64	497	192,049	218,333	
8	156	2,307	7	2,470	3,216	14	25,027	67	511	195,265	220,803	
9	169	3,222	6	3,397	2,834	12	25,578	72	523	198,099	224,200	
10	229	3,244	8	3,481	2,495	17	26,547	75	540	200,594	227,681	
11	136	2,243	17	2,396	4,410	8	24,525	70	548	205,004	230,077	
12	128	2,965	6	3,099	2,979	14	24,631	75	562	207,983	233,176	
13	120	2,179	5	2,304	2,539	14	24,382	72	576	210,522	235,480	
14	66	1,651	6	1,723	2,202	10	23,893	69	586	212,724	237,203	
15	101	1,964	4	2,069	3,270	8	22,684	72	594	215,994	239,272	
16	43	2,021	5	2,069	2,361	18	22,374	68	612	218,355	241,341	
17	144	3,320	10	3,474	2,555	7	23,286	64	619	220,910	244,815	
18	67	1,964	7	2,038	3,772	6	21,546	60	625	224,682	246,853	
19	97	1,633	4	1,734	2,874	16	20,390	64	641	227,556	248,587	
20	58	1,866	7	1,931	2,533	13	19,775	60	654	230,089	250,518	
21	80	1,577	13	1,670	2,640	8	18,797	60	662	232,729	252,188	
22	40	1,413	8	1,461	2,127	5	18,126	62	667	234,856	253,649	
23	21	1,753	8	1,782	1,778	5	18,125	64	672	236,634	255,431	
24	40	2,030	9	2,079	2,275	6	17,923	59	678	238,909	257,510	
25	31	1,228	16	1,275	3,223	3	15,972	55	681	242,132	258,785	
26	22	1,063	5	1,090	2,233	3	14,826	52	684	244,365	259,875	
27	63	1,689	9	1,761	1,897	6	14,684	58	690	246,262	261,636	
28	25	719	3	747	2,061	11	13,359	55	701	248,323	262,383	
29	25	1,070	8	1,103	1,812	9	12,641	62	710	250,135	263,486	
30	24	1,193	22	1,239	1,398	8	12,474	65	718	251,533	264,725	

- 8 November: MOH announced that from 8 December 2021, those who are eligible for vaccination but choose not to do so would have to pay their own medical bills, should they be hospitalized or admitted to COVID-19 treatment facilities.
- 26 November: Following reports of a new, potentially more contagious COVID-19 strain circulating in Botswana, Eswatini, Lesotho, Mozambique, Namibia, South Africa, and Zimbabwe, MOH announced that from 28 November, all long-term pass holders and short-term visitors who have travelled to those countries in the last 14 days would be barred from entering or transiting through Singapore; returning citizens and permanent residents would be required to serve a 10-day SHN at dedicated facilities upon arrival. As COVID-19 Omicron variant becomes widespread, travellers from European Union, United Kingdom and United States will be required to serve 10-day SHN upon arrival.
- 28 November: MTI announced that from 29 November, travellers from Malaysia entering Singapore via the newly-launched land VTL would be required to take an on-arrival ART test.
- 30 November:
  - In view of the global presence of the Omicron variant, MOH announced that it would halt relaxations on social measures until February 2022.
  - MOH announced that from 3 December, all travellers entering or transiting through Singapore would be required to take PCR tests upon arrival, as well as undergo additional supervised ATR tests.

=== December ===
Day	New cases				New recoveries	New deaths	Active cases	In ICU	Total deaths	Total recovered	Total cases	Ref.
Day	Dorm Residents	Community	Imported	Total	New recoveries	New deaths	Active cases	In ICU	Total deaths	Total recovered	Total cases	Ref.
1	45	1,266	13	1,324	1,535	8	12,255	61	726	253,068	266,049	
2	41	1,051	9	1,101	2,056	9	11,291	60	735	255,124	267,150	
3	11	738	17	766	1,393	9	10,655	50	744	256,517	267,916	
4	24	707	12	743	1,521	2	9,875	54	746	258,038	268,659	
5	14	523	15	552	1,518	13	8,896	52	759	259,556	269,211	
6	13	638	11	662	1,198	4	8,356	47	763	260,754	269,873	
From 7 December 2021, MOH will no longer issue daily COVID-19 reports, though statistics will still be updated on the website.
7	5	700	10	715	884	8	8,179	43	771	261,638	270,588	
8	20	679	10	709	1,113	3	7,772	40	774	262,751	271,297	
9	16	649	17	682	1,474	5	6,975	40	779	264,225	271,979	
10	4	436	14	454	1,017	4	6,408	40	783	265,242	272,433	
11	6	530	23	559	956	6	6,005	32	789	266,198	272,992	
12	4	355	11	370	830	5	5,540	30	794	267,028	273,362	
13	6	316	17	339	669	4	5,206	30	798	267,697	273,701	
14	8	400	34	442	603	6	5,039	31	804	268,300	274,143	
15	10	441	23	474	636	3	4,874	28	807	268,936	274,617	
16	9	314	32	355	847	1	4,381	30	808	269,783	274,942	
17	6	369	37	412	570	1	4,222	33	809	270,353	275,384	
18	6	220	45	271	501	1	3,991	30	810	270,854	275,655	
19	6	180	69	255	503	3	3,740	29	813	271,357	275,910	
20	5	141	49	195	396	2	3,537	29	815	271,753	276,105	
21	5	221	54	280	428	2	3,387	26	817	272,181	276,385	
22	14	243	78	335	494	1	3,227	23	818	272,675	276,720	
23	7	225	90	322	417	2	3,130	20	820	273,092	277,042	
24	9	178	78	265	388	-	3,007	19	820	273,480	277,307	
25	5	176	67	248	379	1	2,875	19	821	273,859	277,555	
26	4	105	100	209	345	1	2,738	18	822	274,204	277,764	
27	5	140	135	280	319	3	2,696	17	825	274,523	278,044	
28	1	191	173	365	285	-	2,776	17	825	274,808	278,409	
29	6	183	152	341	276	1	2,840	16	826	275,084	278,750	
30	4	192	115	311	273	1	2,877	16	827	275,357	279,061	
31	7	165	172	344	352	1	2,868	16	828	275,709	279,405	

- 10 December: MOH announced the authorization of the Pfizer-BioNTech COVID-19 vaccine for use on those aged 5 to 11, as well as the extension of boosters to those aged 18 to 29. The Pfizer-BioNTech COVID-19 vaccine is also approved for full registration.
- 11 December: It was announced that Singapore had concluded a purchase agreement with AstraZeneca for its Evusheld COVID-19 treatment drug, with the first shipment to arrive at the end of 2021.
- 14 December: MOH announced that Singapore will ease work-from-home requirements, where all must be fully vaccinated from 1 January 2022, and priority will be given to those who took the third booster jab to return to office fully. Those who did not do so will return to office partially up to 80%. In addition, Vaccinated Measures will be extended to all places and events from 1 January 2022.
- 26 December:
  - MOH announced that those infected with the Omicron variant would be allowed to recover at home or community facilities, and would no longer be isolated in dedicated facilities by default.
  - MOH announced that unvaccinated workers, even those with a negative pre-event test result, would be barred from returning to the workplace from 15 January 2022. Those who are partially-vaccinated will still be allowed to return with a negative test result, though they have until 31 January to complete their regimen.
  - It was announced that Singapore would lift its travel ban on Botswana, Eswatini, Ghana, Lesotho, Malawi, Mozambique, Namibia, Nigeria, South Africa and Zimbabwe from 27 December.
- 31 December: MOH announced that from 8 January 2022, non-VTL travellers to Singapore would no longer be required to be tested on arrival, while the 7-day testing regime for VTL travellers would be extended by 4 weeks to 30 January 2022.
