= Timeline of the COVID-19 pandemic in Singapore (2022) =

The following is a timeline of the COVID-19 pandemic in Singapore in 2022.

== January ==
| Day | New cases | | | | New recoveries | New deaths | Active cases | In ICU | Total deaths | Total recovered | Total cases | Ref. |
| Day | Dorm Residents | Community (Note: From 10 January, dormitory cases will be re-classified together with community cases under "local cases" on the MOH website.) | Imported | Total | New recoveries | New deaths | Active cases | In ICU | Total deaths | Total recovered | Total cases | Ref. |
|---|---|---|---|---|---|---|---|---|---|---|---|---|
| 1 | 9 | 187 | 260 | 456 | 324 | 1 | 2,999 | 14 | 829 | 276,033 | 279,861 | |
| 2 | 4 | 128 | 297 | 429 | 246 | - | 3,182 | 14 | 829 | 276,279 | 280,290 | |
| 3 | 2 | 177 | 285 | 464 | 364 | - | 3,282 | 13 | 829 | 276,643 | 280,754 | |
| 4 | 6 | 335 | 501 | 842 | 271 | 3 | 3,850 | 13 | 832 | 276,914 | 281,596 | |
| 5 | 13 | 353 | 439 | 805 | 453 | 2 | 4,200 | 14 | 834 | 277,367 | 282,401 | |
| 6 | 19 | 405 | 389 | 813 | 392 | 1 | 4,620 | 13 | 835 | 277,759 | 283,214 | |
| 7 | 15 | 366 | 396 | 777 | 338 | 2 | 5,057 | 12 | 837 | 278,097 | 283,991 | |
| 8 | 14 | 253 | 544 | 811 | 336 | - | 5,532 | 11 | 837 | 278,433 | 284,802 | |
| 9 | 16 | 242 | 587 | 845 | 431 | 1 | 5,945 | 11 | 838 | 278,864 | 285,647 | |
| 10 | 13 | 250 | 487 | 750 | 530 | - | 6,165 | 11 | 838 | 279,394 | 286,397 | |
| 11 | 35 | 411 | 400 | 846 | 529 | - | 6,482 | 11 | 838 | 279,923 | 287,243 | |
| 12 | 45 | 441 | 396 | 882 | 636 | 1 | 6,727 | 11 | 839 | 280,559 | 288,125 | |
| 13 | 31 | 450 | 479 | 960 | 850 | - | 6,837 | 9 | 839 | 281,409 | 289,085 | |
| 14 | 55 | 527 | 363 | 945 | 938 | 1 | 6,843 | 11 | 840 | 282,347 | 290,030 | |
| 15 | 74 | 478 | 404 | 956 | 710 | 3 | 7,086 | 12 | 843 | 283,057 | 290,986 | |
| 16 | 51 | 448 | 364 | 863 | 823 | - | 7,125 | 13 | 843 | 283,880 | 291,849 | |
| 17 | 66 | 565 | 534 | 1,165 | 699 | - | 7,592 | 13 | 843 | 284,579 | 293,014 | |
| 18 | 73 | 917 | 458 | 1,448 | 772 | - | 8,268 | 13 | 843 | 285,351 | 294,462 | |
| 19 | 101 | 1,104 | 410 | 1,615 | 686 | 1 | 9,196 | 13 | 844 | 286,037 | 296,077 | |
| 20 | 121 | 1,012 | 339 | 1,472 | 966 | 1 | 9,701 | 14 | 845 | 287,003 | 297,549 | |
From 21 January, MOH will include Protocol 2 cases in their daily case count, with cases backdated to 6 January on the website.
| 21 | 136 | 2,658 | 361 | 3,155 | 4,453 | 1 | 11,962 | 13 | 846 | 295,005 | 307,813 | |
| 22 | 71 | 2,147 | 245 | 2,463 | 2,120 | 1 | 12,304 | 11 | 847 | 297,125 | 310,276 | |
| 23 | 150 | 2,907 | 439 | 3,496 | 2,323 | 1 | 13,476 | 9 | 848 | 299,448 | 313,772 | |
| 24 | 59 | 2,565 | 378 | 3,002 | 3,017 | - | 13,461 | 11 | 848 | 302,465 | 316,774 | |
| 25 | 134 | 5,444 | 418 | 5,996 | 3,067 | 2 | 16,388 | 10 | 850 | 305,532 | 322,770 | |
| 26 | 159 | 4,401 | 272 | 4,832 | 2,948 | - | 18,272 | 11 | 850 | 308,480 | 327,602 | |
| 27 | 127 | 4,963 | 379 | 5,469 | 3,109 | - | 20,632 | 12 | 850 | 311,589 | 333,071 | |
| 28 | 126 | 5,146 | 282 | 5,554 | 5,454 | 3 | 20,729 | 10 | 853 | 317,043 | 338,625 | |
| 29 | 103 | 4,856 | 248 | 5,207 | 4,798 | 1 | 21,137 | 13 | 854 | 321,841 | 343,832 | |
| 30 | 53 | 4,173 | 272 | 4,498 | 5,155 | - | 20,480 | 12 | 854 | 326,996 | 348,330 | |
| 31 | 44 | 4,197 | 240 | 4,481 | 5,529 | 1 | 19,431 | 10 | 855 | 332,525 | 352,811 | |
Notes:

- 1 January: It was announced that work-related events of up to 1,000 participants (vaccinated, recovered or medically ineligible for vaccines) without food and drinks would be allowed from 3 January onwards; participants would be required to be placed in zones of 100 participants each, with 2-metre distancing between them.
- 3 January: Siblings will be allowed to walk in to any paediatric vaccination centre every Monday to Thursday, subject to conditions, from 10 January onwards.
- 13 January: Taxi drivers who have yet to be fully vaccinated before 1 February will be allowed to suspend their contracts until they have completed their regimen.

== February ==
| Day | New cases | | | | New recoveries | New deaths | Active cases | In ICU | Total deaths | Total recovered | Total cases | Ref. |
| Day | Dorm Residents | Community | Imported | Total | New recoveries | New deaths | Active cases | In ICU | Total deaths | Total recovered | Total cases | Ref. |
|---|---|---|---|---|---|---|---|---|---|---|---|---|
| 1 | 41 | 6,079 | 144 | 6,264 | 5,218 | 3 | 20,474 | 12 | 858 | 337,743 | 359,075 | |
| 2 | 19 | 2,900 | 182 | 3,101 | 4,874 | 1 | 18,700 | 12 | 859 | 342,617 | 362,176 | |
| 3 | 25 | 4,061 | 210 | 4,297 | 4,614 | 1 | 18,382 | 16 | 860 | 347,231 | 366,473 | |
| 4 | 75 | 12,971 | 162 | 13,208 | 5,936 | 6 | 25,648 | 15 | 866 | 353,167 | 379,681 | |
| 5 | 71 | 10,137 | 182 | 10,390 | 2,444 | 2 | 33,592 | 23 | 868 | 355,611 | 390,071 | |
| 6 | 49 | 7,590 | 113 | 7,752 | 4,732 | 3 | 36,609 | 21 | 871 | 360,343 | 397,823 | |
| 7 | 52 | 7,577 | 177 | 7,806 | 12,041 | 3 | 32,371 | 26 | 874 | 372,384 | 405,629 | |
| 8 | 70 | 12,721 | 220 | 13,011 | 8,892 | 3 | 36,487 | 23 | 877 | 381,276 | 418,640 | |
| 9 | 76 | 10,098 | 140 | 10,314 | 8,052 | 4 | 38,745 | 30 | 881 | 389,328 | 428,954 | |
| 10 | 63 | 10,480 | 143 | 10,686 | 8,371 | 1 | 41,059 | 29 | 882 | 397,699 | 439,640 | |
| 11 | 84 | 9,687 | 159 | 9,930 | 12,732 | 3 | 38,254 | 21 | 885 | 410,431 | 449,570 | |
| 12 | 61 | 10,265 | 179 | 10,505 | 9,521 | 8 | 39,230 | 22 | 893 | 419,952 | 460,075 | |
| 13 | 37 | 9,157 | 226 | 9,420 | 10,133 | 4 | 38,513 | 24 | 897 | 430,085 | 469,495 | |
| 14 | 30 | 8,897 | 155 | 9,082 | 10,298 | 9 | 37,288 | 23 | 906 | 440,383 | 478,577 | |
| 15 | 74 | 19,105 | 241 | 19,420 | 10,432 | 7 | 46,269 | 23 | 913 | 450,815 | 497,997 | |
| 16 | 76 | 16,615 | 192 | 16,883 | 9,453 | 13 | 53,686 | 35 | 926 | 460,268 | 514,880 | |
| 17 | 62 | 18,218 | 265 | 18,545 | 9,425 | 4 | 62,802 | 32 | 930 | 469,693 | 533,425 | |
| 18 | 73 | 17,813 | 208 | 18,094 | 19,606 | 7 | 61,283 | 39 | 937 | 489,299 | 551,519 | |
| 19 | 50 | 15,649 | 137 | 15,836 | 15,217 | 4 | 61,898 | 43 | 941 | 504,516 | 567,355 | |
| 20 | 44 | 15,026 | 213 | 15,283 | 17,073 | 4 | 60,104 | 39 | 945 | 521,589 | 582,638 | |
| 21 | 29 | 13,447 | 147 | 13,623 | 18,698 | 7 | 55,022 | 44 | 952 | 540,287 | 596,261 | |
| 22 | 55 | 25,676 | 301 | 26,032 | 17,163 | 4 | 63,887 | 46 | 956 | 557,450 | 622,293 | |
| 23 | 41 | 20,111 | 160 | 20,312 | 15,298 | 7 | 68,894 | 46 | 963 | 572,748 | 642,605 | |
| 24 | 28 | 18,406 | 159 | 18,593 | 13,935 | 12 | 73,540 | 44 | 975 | 586,683 | 661,198 | |
| 25 | 48 | 18,335 | 214 | 18,597 | 25,327 | 11 | 66,799 | 46 | 986 | 612,010 | 679,795 | |
| 26 | 29 | 16,685 | 143 | 16,857 | 19,308 | 13 | 64,335 | 50 | 999 | 631,318 | 696,652 | |
| 27 | 24 | 14,040 | 164 | 14,228 | 19,041 | 8 | 59,514 | 46 | 1,007 | 650,359 | 710,880 | |
| 28 | 18 | 13,432 | 94 | 13,544 | 18,884 | 12 | 54,162 | 49 | 1,019 | 669,243 | 724,424 | |

- 3 February:
  - HSA announced that it had approved Pfizer's Paxlovid COVID-19 treatment tablet for use in Singapore.
  - Two politicians, Minister of State for Communications and Information and National Development Tan Kiat How and Parliamentary Secretary for Culture, Community and Youth and Social and Family Development Eric Chua, have revealed that they tested positive for COVID-19.
- 12 February: The first shipment of Pfizer's Paxlovid COVID-19 treatment tablet has arrived in Singapore.
- 16 February: It was announced that current COVID-19 safety measures would be streamlined from 25 February onwards: the limit of unique visitors per household would be altered from 5 per day to 5 at any one time. Safe distancing between people in mask-on settings would no longer be mandatory, and border measures for travellers would also be relaxed from 22 February.
- 24 February: MOH announced that the planned streamlining of COVID-19 safety measures on 25 February would be postponed, due to the recent surge in cases.

== March ==
| Day | New cases | | | | New recoveries | New deaths | Active cases | In ICU | Total deaths | Total recovered | Total cases | Ref. |
| Day | Dorm Residents | Community | Imported | Total | New recoveries | New deaths | Active cases | In ICU | Total deaths | Total recovered | Total cases | Ref. |
|---|---|---|---|---|---|---|---|---|---|---|---|---|
| 1 | 43 | 23,848 | 189 | 24,080 | 17,205 | 11 | 61,026 | 53 | 1,030 | 686,448 | 748,504 | |
| 2 | 40 | 18,958 | 161 | 19,159 | 14,722 | 10 | 65,453 | 51 | 1,040 | 701,170 | 767,663 | |
| 3 | 30 | 17,961 | 171 | 18,162 | 14,249 | 9 | 69,357 | 53 | 1,049 | 715,419 | 785,825 | |
| 4 | 22 | 17,383 | 159 | 17,564 | 23,545 | 18 | 63,358 | 45 | 1,067 | 738,964 | 803,389 | |
| 5 | 32 | 16,087 | 155 | 16,274 | 18,777 | 6 | 60,849 | 48 | 1,073 | 757,741 | 819,663 | |
| 6 | 28 | 12,990 | 140 | 13,158 | 18,172 | 5 | 55,830 | 47 | 1,078 | 775,913 | 832,821 | |
| 7 | 16 | 13,355 | 149 | 13,520 | 18,174 | 6 | 51,170 | 54 | 1,084 | 794,087 | 846,341 | |
| 8 | 33 | 21,950 | 218 | 22,201 | 16,667 | 15 | 56,689 | 49 | 1,099 | 810,754 | 868,542 | |
| 9 | 36 | 16,822 | 193 | 17,051 | 13,707 | 11 | 60,022 | 50 | 1,110 | 824,461 | 885,593 | |
| 10 | 25 | 15,965 | 175 | 16,165 | 13,375 | 6 | 62,806 | 36 | 1,116 | 837,836 | 901,758 | |
| 11 | 25 | 15,105 | 215 | 15,345 | 21,481 | 13 | 56,657 | 39 | 1,129 | 859,317 | 917,103 | |
| 12 | 21 | 12,499 | 112 | 12,632 | 16,614 | 10 | 52,665 | 37 | 1,139 | 875,931 | 929,735 | |
| 13 | 12 | 9,585 | 104 | 9,701 | 16,291 | 6 | 46,069 | 32 | 1,145 | 892,222 | 939,436 | |
| 14 | 9 | 8,932 | 101 | 9,042 | 16,069 | 8 | 39,034 | 37 | 1,153 | 908,291 | 948,478 | |
| 15 | 29 | 15,657 | 165 | 15,851 | 12,945 | 6 | 41,934 | 40 | 1,159 | 921,236 | 964,329 | |
| 16 | 13 | 11,128 | 137 | 11,278 | 10,871 | 11 | 42,330 | 36 | 1,170 | 932,107 | 975,607 | |
| 17 | 10 | 10,575 | 128 | 10,713 | 9,994 | 12 | 43,037 | 29 | 1,182 | 942,101 | 986,320 | |
| 18 | 11 | 10,424 | 159 | 10,594 | 15,684 | 9 | 37,938 | 30 | 1,191 | 957,785 | 996,914 | |
| 19 | 20 | 10,081 | 143 | 10,244 | 11,536 | 3 | 36,643 | 27 | 1,194 | 969,321 | 1,007,158 | |
| 20 | 10 | 7,723 | 126 | 7,859 | 11,284 | 4 | 33,214 | 23 | 1,198 | 980,605 | 1,015,017 | |
| 21 | 14 | 7,380 | 144 | 7,538 | 10,706 | 10 | 30,036 | 25 | 1,208 | 991,311 | 1,022,555 | |
| 22 | 22 | 12,903 | 241 | 13,166 | 9,716 | 6 | 33,480 | 24 | 1,214 | 1,001,027 | 1,035,721 | |
| 23 | 20 | 8,729 | 191 | 8,940 | 8,381 | 6 | 34,033 | 26 | 1,220 | 1,009,408 | 1,044,661 | |
| 24 | 23 | 8,281 | 174 | 8,478 | 8,258 | 6 | 34,247 | 24 | 1,226 | 1,017,666 | 1,053,139 | |
| 25 | 11 | 7,365 | 208 | 7,584 | 12,655 | 13 | 29,163 | 28 | 1,239 | 1,030,321 | 1,060,723 | |
| 26 | 13 | 6,299 | 122 | 6,434 | 8,606 | 7 | 26,984 | 24 | 1,246 | 1,038,927 | 1,067,157 | |
| 27 | 15 | 4,731 | 102 | 4,848 | 7,391 | 4 | 24,437 | 22 | 1,250 | 1,046,318 | 1,072,005 | |
| 28 | 3 | 4,810 | 112 | 4,925 | 8,779 | 4 | 20,579 | 25 | 1,254 | 1,055,097 | 1,076,930 | |
| 29 | 17 | 7,993 | 154 | 8,164 | 6,876 | 4 | 21,863 | 25 | 1,258 | 1,061,973 | 1,085,094 | |
| 30 | 14 | 5,576 | 139 | 5,729 | 5,496 | 5 | 22,091 | 26 | 1,263 | 1,067,469 | 1,090,823 | |
| 31 | 19 | 5,440 | 146 | 5,605 | 5,152 | 5 | 23,807 | 27 | 1,268 | 1,072,621 | 1,096,428 | |

- 9 March: MOM announced that employers who deliberately refuse to comply with established guidelines on leave arrangements for employees infected with COVID-19 would have their work pass privileges suspended.
- 11 March: MOH announced that the planned streamlined COVID-19 safety measures would take effect on 15 March.
- 21 March: MOH announced that it would be suspending its vaccination channels for overseas Singaporeans, in the wake of increased ease of access to the vaccines and the relaxation of border measures.
- 24 March:
  - Prime Minister Lee Hsien Loong announced that from 29 March, the limit on group gatherings would be increased from 5 to 10, with 75 percent of employees working from home allowed to return to the workplace. Mask-wearing would also be made optional outdoors, though it would still be mandatory indoors.
  - MOH announced that from 29 March, dining-in would be allowed for groups of up to 10 vaccinated persons, with restrictions on live performances and the sale and consumption of alcohol after 10:30 P.M. to be lifted. Routine testing for workers in all sectors would also no longer be required.
- 31 March: MOH announced that in-person visits for fully-vaccinated persons to all hospital wards and care homes would resume from 4 April, though those who are medically ineligible for the vaccine would be exempted.

== April ==
| Day | New cases | | | | New recoveries | New deaths | Active cases | In ICU | Total deaths | Total recovered | Total cases | Ref. |
| Day | Dorm Residents | Community | Imported | Total | New recoveries | New deaths | Active cases | In ICU | Total deaths | Total recovered | Total cases | Ref. |
|---|---|---|---|---|---|---|---|---|---|---|---|---|
| 1 | 16 | 4,877 | 117 | 5,010 | 8,201 | 2 | 19,346 | 23 | 1,270 | 1,080,822 | 1,101,438 | |
| 2 | 4 | 4,468 | 91 | 4,563 | 5,742 | 2 | 18,165 | 22 | 1,272 | 1,086,564 | 1,106,001 | |
| 3 | 8 | 3,666 | 69 | 3,743 | 5,612 | 4 | 16,292 | 21 | 1,276 | 1,092,176 | 1,109,744 | |
| 4 | 6 | 3,274 | 54 | 3,334 | 5,155 | 7 | 14,464 | 20 | 1,283 | 1,097,331 | 1,113,078 | |
| 5 | 6 | 6,215 | 120 | 6,341 | 4,644 | 1 | 16,160 | 16 | 1,284 | 1,101,975 | 1,119,419 | |
| 6 | 10 | 4,360 | 97 | 4,467 | 3,918 | 3 | 16,706 | 15 | 1,287 | 1,105,893 | 1,123,886 | |
| 7 | 8 | 4,137 | 124 | 4,269 | 3,595 | 3 | 17,377 | 15 | 1,290 | 1,109,488 | 1,128,155 | |
| 8 | 14 | 3,866 | 134 | 4,014 | 6,261 | 7 | 15,123 | 18 | 1,297 | 1,115,749 | 1,132,169 | |
| 9 | 8 | 3,127 | 124 | 3,259 | 4,439 | 2 | 13,941 | 18 | 1,299 | 1,120,188 | 1,135,428 | |
| 10 | 3 | 2,508 | 62 | 2,573 | 4,341 | 2 | 12,171 | 17 | 1,301 | 1,124,529 | 1,138,001 | |
| 11 | 2 | 2,490 | 76 | 2,568 | 4,188 | 2 | 10,549 | 18 | 1,303 | 1,128,717 | 1,140,569 | |
| 12 | 11 | 4,409 | 132 | 4,552 | 3,329 | 4 | 11,768 | 19 | 1,307 | 1,132,046 | 1,145,121 | |
| 13 | 5 | 3,405 | 125 | 3,535 | 2,885 | 2 | 12,416 | 13 | 1,309 | 1,134,931 | 1,148,656 | |
| 14 | 3 | 3,404 | 114 | 3,521 | 2,725 | - | 13,212 | 9 | 1,309 | 1,137,656 | 1,152,177 | |
| 15 | 4 | 3,287 | 113 | 3,404 | 4,488 | 1 | 12,127 | 10 | 1,310 | 1,142,144 | 1,155,581 | |
| 16 | 1 | 1,619 | 50 | 1,670 | 3,458 | 3 | 10,336 | 8 | 1,313 | 1,145,602 | 1,157,251 | |
| 17 | 1 | 2,954 | 94 | 3,049 | 3,546 | 3 | 9,836 | 4 | 1,316 | 1,149,148 | 1,160,300 | |
| 18 | 2 | 2,400 | 78 | 2,480 | 3,396 | - | 8,920 | 9 | 1,316 | 1,152,544 | 1,162,780 | |
| 19 | 8 | 4,536 | 174 | 4,718 | 1,842 | 1 | 11,795 | 9 | 1,317 | 1,154,386 | 1,167,498 | |
| 20 | - | 3,324 | 148 | 3,472 | 3,127 | 2 | 12,138 | 8 | 1,319 | 1,157,513 | 1,170,970 | |
| 21 | 7 | 3,238 | 175 | 3,420 | 2,572 | 3 | 12,983 | 6 | 1,322 | 1,160,085 | 1,174,390 | |
| 22 | 4 | 2,905 | 116 | 3,025 | 4,546 | 2 | 11,460 | 10 | 1,324 | 1,164,631 | 1,177,415 | |
| 23 | 3 | 2,627 | 79 | 2,709 | 3,375 | 1 | 10,793 | 9 | 1,325 | 1,168,006 | 1,180,124 | |
| 24 | 6 | 1,984 | 54 | 2,044 | 3,521 | - | 9,316 | 8 | 1,325 | 1,171,527 | 1,182,168 | |
| 25 | 2 | 2,008 | 48 | 2,058 | 3,067 | 6 | 8,301 | 7 | 1,331 | 1,174,594 | 1,184,226 | |
| 26 | 6 | 3,627 | 55 | 3,688 | 2,778 | 2 | 9,209 | 7 | 1,333 | 1,177,372 | 1,187,914 | |
| 27 | 4 | 2,598 | 44 | 2,646 | 2,115 | 1 | 9,739 | 8 | 1,334 | 1,179,487 | 1,190,560 | |
| 28 | 4 | 2,648 | 38 | 2,690 | 2,205 | - | 10,224 | 6 | 1,334 | 1,181,692 | 1,193,250 | |
| 29 | 8 | 2,455 | 54 | 2,517 | 3,564 | - | 9,177 | 6 | 1,334 | 1,185,256 | 1,195,767 | |
| 30 | 4 | 2,079 | 58 | 2,141 | 2,562 | 1 | 8,755 | 6 | 1,335 | 1,187,818 | 1,197,908 | |

- 4 April: It was announced that all nightlife businesses would be allowed to fully reopen from 19 April, with a negative ART required for establishments that feature dancing among patrons.
- 19 April: HSA announced that it had approved the traditional Chinese medicine Lianhua Qingwen for clinical trials and the antiviral drug Lagevrio for use in COVID-19 treatment in Singapore.
- 22 April: MOH announced that from 26 April, Singapore's DORSCON level would be lowered from Orange to Yellow; limits on groups and safe distancing would no longer be required, with all employees allowed to return to the workplace. Employees would also be allowed to remove their masks at the workplace when not interacting with others. Health risk notices (HRCs) would no longer be issued, with TraceTogether and SafeEntry would be removed from all settings save for F&B outlets, nightlife establishments, and events with more than 500 people. Fully-vaccinated and well travellers to Singapore would also no longer be required to take a pre-departure test.
- 24 April: The Ministry of Sustainability and the Environment (MSE) announced that it would gradually reduce the number of safe-distancing ambassadors, in the wake of the easing of COVID-19 safety measures.

== May ==
| Day | New cases | | | | New recoveries | New deaths | Active cases | In ICU | Total deaths | Total recovered | Total cases | Ref. |
| Day | Dorm Residents | Community | Imported | Total | New recoveries | New deaths | Active cases | In ICU | Total deaths | Total recovered | Total cases | Ref. |
|---|---|---|---|---|---|---|---|---|---|---|---|---|
| 1 | 2 | 1,692 | 38 | 1,732 | 2,698 | 1 | 7,788 | 7 | 1,336 | 1,190,516 | 1,199,640 | |
| 2 | - | 1,301 | 35 | 1,336 | 2,561 | 2 | 6,561 | 6 | 1,338 | 1,193,077 | 1,200,976 | |
| 3 | 5 | 1,503 | 62 | 1,570 | 2,186 | - | 5,945 | 5 | 1,338 | 1,195,263 | 1,202,546 | |
| 4 | - | 1,557 | 81 | 1,638 | 1,811 | 2 | 5,770 | 6 | 1,340 | 1,197,074 | 1,204,184 | |
| 5 | 1 | 4,474 | 258 | 4,733 | 1,423 | 4 | 9,076 | 6 | 1,344 | 1,198,497 | 1,208,917 | |
| 6 | 4 | 3,197 | 219 | 3,420 | 1,770 | 2 | 10,724 | 5 | 1,346 | 1,200,267 | 1,212,337 | |
| 7 | 3 | 2,944 | 215 | 3,162 | 1,720 | 4 | 12,162 | 5 | 1,350 | 1,201,987 | 1,215,499 | |
| 8 | 1 | 2,268 | 154 | 2,423 | 4,529 | 2 | 10,054 | 6 | 1,352 | 1,206,516 | 1,217,922 | |
| 9 | 3 | 2,170 | 98 | 2,271 | 3,070 | - | 9,255 | 6 | 1,352 | 1,209,586 | 1,220,193 | |
| 10 | 5 | 4,614 | 212 | 4,831 | 3,119 | 4 | 10,963 | 6 | 1,356 | 1,212,705 | 1,225,024 | |
| 11 | 5 | 3,711 | 174 | 3,890 | 2,485 | 2 | 12,366 | 6 | 1,358 | 1,215,190 | 1,228,914 | |
| 12 | 6 | 3,492 | 147 | 3,645 | 2,415 | 3 | 13,593 | 7 | 1,361 | 1,217,605 | 1,232,559 | |
| 13 | 4 | 4,175 | 112 | 4,291 | 4,682 | 1 | 13,201 | 6 | 1,362 | 1,222,287 | 1,236,850 | |
| 14 | 3 | 3,282 | 98 | 3,383 | 3,755 | - | 12,829 | 8 | 1,362 | 1,226,042 | 1,240,233 | |
From 15 May, MOH no longer reports dormitory cases, instead a new formula was used to only include reported and unreported cases.
| 15 | | 2,594 | 57 | 2,651 | 3,897 | 1 | 11,582 | 9 | 1,363 | 1,229,939 | 1,242,884 | |
| 16 | | 2,073 | 50 | 2,123 | 3,846 | 3 | 9,856 | 8 | 1,366 | 1,233,785 | 1,245,007 | |
| 17 | | 2,602 | 62 | 2,664 | 3,332 | 1 | 9,187 | 8 | 1,367 | 1,237,117 | 1,247,671 | |
| 18 | | 6,289 | 153 | 6,442 | 2,781 | 2 | 12,846 | 8 | 1,369 | 1,239,898 | 1,254,113 | |
| 19 | | 4,471 | 107 | 4,578 | 2,338 | 2 | 15,084 | 8 | 1,371 | 1,242,236 | 1,258,691 | |
| 20 | | 4,228 | 114 | 4,342 | 2,799 | 3 | 16,624 | 8 | 1,374 | 1,245,035 | 1,263,033 | |
| 21 | | 3,619 | 156 | 3,775 | 6,191 | - | 14,208 | 7 | 1,374 | 1,251,226 | 1,266,808 | |
| 22 | | 2,724 | 103 | 2,827 | 4,306 | 1 | 12,728 | 6 | 1,375 | 1,255,532 | 1,269,635 | |
| 23 | | 2,678 | 73 | 2,751 | 4,285 | 2 | 11,192 | 4 | 1,377 | 1,259,817 | 1,272,386 | |
| 24 | | 5,623 | 104 | 5,727 | 3,968 | 1 | 12,950 | 5 | 1,378 | 1,263,785 | 1,278,113 | |
| 25 | | 4,162 | 5 | 4,167 | 2,935 | 2 | 14,180 | 5 | 1,380 | 1,266,720 | 1,282,280 | |
| 26 | | 3,829 | 107 | 3,936 | 3,009 | 2 | 15,105 | 8 | 1,382 | 1,269,729 | 1,286,216 | |
| 27 | | 3,710 | 120 | 3,830 | 5,574 | 1 | 13,360 | 7 | 1,383 | 1,275,303 | 1,290,046 | |
| 28 | | 3,244 | 79 | 3,323 | 4,040 | - | 12,643 | 7 | 1,383 | 1,279,343 | 1,293,369 | |
| 29 | | 2,448 | 103 | 2,551 | 3,968 | - | 11,226 | 9 | 1,383 | 1,283,311 | 1,295,920 | |
| 30 | | 2,306 | 83 | 2,389 | 3,828 | 3 | 9,784 | 9 | 1,386 | 1,287,139 | 1,298,309 | |
| 31 | | 4,774 | 211 | 4,985 | 3,347 | 3 | 11,419 | 11 | 1,389 | 1,290,486 | 1,303,294 | |

- 4 May:
  - Singapore Pools announced that lottery draws with live audiences would resume from 5 May.
  - It was announced that the first shipment of the Novavax COVID-19 vaccine had arrived in Singapore, with it to be offered at its first joint testing and vaccination center and 20 Public Health Preparedness Clinics (PHPCs) by the end of the month.
- 22 May: It was announced that Terminal 2 at Changi Airport would reopen in phases from 29 May.

== June ==
| Day | New cases | | | New recoveries | New deaths | Active cases | In ICU | Total deaths | Total recovered | Total cases | Ref. |
| Day | Local | Imported | Total | New recoveries | New deaths | Active cases | In ICU | Total deaths | Total recovered | Total cases | Ref. |
|---|---|---|---|---|---|---|---|---|---|---|---|
| 1 | 3,413 | 164 | 3,577 | 2,686 | - | 12,310 | 11 | 1,389 | 1,293,172 | 1,306,871 | |
| 2 | 3,568 | 177 | 3,745 | 2,600 | - | 13,455 | 7 | 1,389 | 1,295,772 | 1,310,616 | |
| 3 | 3,098 | 135 | 3,233 | 4,852 | - | 11,836 | 12 | 1,389 | 1,300,624 | 1,313,849 | |
| 4 | 2,752 | 127 | 2,879 | 3,414 | 3 | 11,298 | 7 | 1,392 | 1,304,038 | 1,316,728 | |
| 5 | 2,145 | 111 | 2,256 | 3,670 | 1 | 9,883 | 8 | 1,393 | 1,307,708 | 1,318,984 | |
| 6 | 2,041 | 121 | 2,162 | 3,433 | - | 8,612 | 9 | 1,393 | 1,311,141 | 1,321,146 | |
| 7 | 4,301 | 176 | 4,477 | 3,000 | 1 | 10,088 | 8 | 1,394 | 1,314,141 | 1,325,623 | |
| 8 | 3,393 | 209 | 3,602 | 2,383 | - | 11,307 | 9 | 1,394 | 1,316,524 | 1,329,225 | |
| 9 | 3,237 | 194 | 3,431 | 2,284 | 2 | 12,452 | 4 | 1,396 | 1,318,808 | 1,332,656 | |
| 10 | 2,814 | 155 | 2,969 | 4,324 | - | 11,097 | 3 | 1,396 | 1,323,132 | 1,335,625 | |
| 11 | 2,959 | 169 | 3,128 | 3,453 | 1 | 10,771 | 2 | 1,397 | 1,326,585 | 1,338,753 | |
| 12 | 2,349 | 154 | 2,503 | 3,349 | - | 9,925 | 1 | 1,397 | 1,329,934 | 1,341,256 | |
| 13 | 2,182 | 207 | 2,389 | 3,018 | 1 | 9,295 | 3 | 1,398 | 1,332,952 | 1,343,645 | |
| 14 | 4,692 | 438 | 5,130 | 3,048 | 3 | 11,374 | 2 | 1,401 | 1,336,000 | 1,348,775 | |
| 15 | 3,536 | 370 | 3,906 | 2,606 | - | 12,674 | 2 | 1,401 | 1,338,606 | 1,352,681 | |
| 16 | 3,658 | 356 | 4,014 | 2,534 | - | 14,154 | 2 | 1,401 | 1,341,140 | 1,356,695 | |
| 17 | 3,698 | 387 | 4,085 | 4,975 | 1 | 13,263 | 4 | 1,402 | 1,346,115 | 1,360,780 | |
| 18 | 3,456 | 326 | 3,782 | 3,833 | - | 13,212 | 6 | 1,402 | 1,349,948 | 1,364,562 | |
| 19 | 2,900 | 299 | 3,199 | 3,882 | 1 | 12,528 | 8 | 1,403 | 1,353,830 | 1,367,761 | |
| 20 | 2,884 | 336 | 3,220 | 3,975 | 2 | 11,771 | 8 | 1,405 | 1,357,805 | 1,370,981 | |
| 21 | 6,393 | 716 | 7,109 | 3,826 | - | 15,054 | 9 | 1,405 | 1,361,631 | 1,378,090 | |
| 22 | 5,245 | 617 | 5,862 | 3,273 | - | 17,643 | 12 | 1,405 | 1,364,904 | 1,383,952 | |
| 23 | 5,954 | 652 | 6,606 | 3,299 | 3 | 20,947 | 8 | 1,408 | 1,368,203 | 1,390,558 | |
| 24 | 5,874 | 642 | 6,516 | 6,945 | - | 20,518 | 9 | 1,408 | 1,375,148 | 1,397,074 | |
| 25 | 5,654 | 514 | 6,168 | 5,690 | - | 20,996 | 10 | 1,408 | 1,380,838 | 1,403,242 | |
| 26 | 4,697 | 419 | 5,116 | 6,272 | - | 19,840 | 11 | 1,408 | 1,387,110 | 1,408,358 | |
| 27 | 4,845 | 464 | 5,309 | 6,336 | 1 | 18,812 | 9 | 1,409 | 1,393,446 | 1,413,667 | |
| 28 | 10,732 | 772 | 11,504 | 6,229 | 1 | 24,086 | 9 | 1,410 | 1,399,675 | 1,425,171 | |
| 29 | 8,789 | 603 | 9,392 | 5,169 | 1 | 28,308 | 7 | 1,411 | 1,404,844 | 1,434,563 | |
| 30 | 8,929 | 576 | 9,505 | 5,485 | 2 | 32,326 | 11 | 1,413 | 1,410,329 | 1,444,068 | |

- 10 June:
  - MOH announced that from 14 June, group limits and COVID-19 testing would no longer be mandatory at nightlife establishments.
  - It was announced that COVID-19 treatment schemes would be progressively updated as Singapore returns to normal.
  - MOH announced that those aged 50 to 59 who wish to take their second booster shot may do so by simply walking into any COVID-19 vaccination centre.

== July ==
| Day | New cases | | | New recoveries | New deaths | Active cases | In ICU | Total deaths | Total recovered | Total cases | Ref. |
| Day | Local | Imported | Total | New recoveries | New deaths | Active cases | In ICU | Total deaths | Total recovered | Total cases | Ref. |
|---|---|---|---|---|---|---|---|---|---|---|---|
| 1 | 8,592 | 495 | 9,087 | 11,118 | 2 | 30,293 | 11 | 1,415 | 1,421,447 | 1,453,155 | |
| 2 | 7,639 | 313 | 7,952 | 9,136 | 1 | 29,108 | 11 | 1,416 | 1,430,583 | 1,461,107 | |
| 3 | 5,865 | 262 | 6,127 | 9,004 | 2 | 26,229 | 9 | 1,418 | 1,439,587 | 1,467,234 | |
| 4 | 5,700 | 246 | 5,946 | 8,825 | 1 | 23,349 | 14 | 1,419 | 1,448,412 | 1,473,180 | |
| 5 | 12,248 | 536 | 12,784 | 7,876 | 2 | 28,255 | 16 | 1,421 | 1,456,288 | 1,485,964 | |
| 6 | 9,525 | 464 | 9,989 | 6,454 | 2 | 31,788 | 15 | 1,423 | 1,462,742 | 1,495,953 | |
| 7 | 9,534 | 451 | 9,985 | 6,241 | 3 | 35,529 | 12 | 1,426 | 1,468,983 | 1,505,938 | |
| 8 | 8,931 | 353 | 9,284 | 12,643 | 1 | 32,169 | 14 | 1,427 | 1,481,626 | 1,515,222 | |
| 9 | 8,375 | 284 | 8,659 | 9,787 | 1 | 31,040 | 15 | 1,428 | 1,491,413 | 1,523,881 | |
| 10 | 6,200 | 223 | 6,423 | 9,558 | 4 | 27,901 | 18 | 1,432 | 1,500,971 | 1,530,304 | |
| 11 | 4,296 | 199 | 4,495 | 9,074 | - | 23,322 | 16 | 1,432 | 1,510,045 | 1,534,799 | |
| 12 | 5,743 | 236 | 5,979 | 8,908 | 5 | 20,388 | 15 | 1,437 | 1,518,953 | 1,540,778 | |
| 13 | 15,978 | 892 | 16,870 | 6,882 | 3 | 30,373 | 14 | 1,440 | 1,525,835 | 1,557,648 | |
| 14 | 10,992 | 780 | 11,772 | 5,911 | 4 | 36,230 | 20 | 1,444 | 1,531,746 | 1,569,420 | |
| 15 | 9,826 | 700 | 10,526 | 5,390 | 3 | 41,363 | 20 | 1,447 | 1,537,136 | 1,579,946 | |
| 16 | 8,691 | 462 | 9,153 | 16,357 | 3 | 34,156 | 17 | 1,450 | 1,553,493 | 1,589,099 | |
| 17 | 6,638 | 309 | 6,947 | 10,947 | 3 | 30,153 | 14 | 1,453 | 1,564,440 | 1,596,046 | |
| 18 | 5,978 | 249 | 6,227 | 10,100 | 4 | 26,276 | 16 | 1,457 | 1,574,540 | 1,602,273 | |
| 19 | 13,278 | 516 | 13,794 | 9,036 | 3 | 31,031 | 13 | 1,460 | 1,583,576 | 1,616,067 | |
| 20 | 9,896 | 397 | 10,293 | 7,440 | 3 | 33,881 | 17 | 1,463 | 1,591,016 | 1,626,360 | |
| 21 | 9,318 | 431 | 9,749 | 6,724 | 3 | 36,903 | 15 | 1,466 | 1,597,740 | 1,636,109 | |
| 22 | 8,635 | 348 | 8,983 | 13,600 | 2 | 32,284 | 14 | 1,468 | 1,611,340 | 1,645,092 | |
| 23 | 7,592 | 297 | 7,889 | 10,077 | 4 | 30,092 | 11 | 1,472 | 1,621,417 | 1,652,981 | |
| 24 | 5,950 | 225 | 6,175 | 9,367 | 4 | 26,896 | 21 | 1,476 | 1,630,784 | 1,659,156 | |
| 25 | 5,358 | 193 | 5,551 | 8,984 | 7 | 23,456 | 19 | 1,483 | 1,639,768 | 1,664,707 | |
| 26 | 11,934 | 485 | 12,419 | 8,063 | 4 | 27,808 | 18 | 1,487 | 1,647,831 | 1,677,126 | |
| 27 | 8,420 | 343 | 8,763 | 6,429 | 3 | 30,139 | 19 | 1,490 | 1,654,260 | 1,685,889 | |
| 28 | 8,206 | 359 | 8,565 | 6,069 | 2 | 32,633 | 18 | 1,492 | 1,660,329 | 1,694,454 | |
| 29 | 7,629 | 309 | 7,938 | 12,185 | 2 | 28,384 | 19 | 1,494 | 1,672,514 | 1,702,392 | |
| 30 | 6,297 | 261 | 6,558 | 8,830 | 3 | 26,109 | 15 | 1,497 | 1,681,344 | 1,708,950 | |
| 31 | 4,913 | 193 | 5,106 | 8,192 | 3 | 23,020 | 15 | 1,500 | 1,689,536 | 1,714,056 | |

- 5 July: It was announced that from 7 July to 3 August 2022, the number of visitors and the duration of visits to hospitals and residential care homes would be limited, in the wake of the rise in community cases.

== August ==
| Day | New cases | | | New recoveries | New deaths | Active cases | In ICU | Total deaths (Note: On 1 August, 18 deaths were retroactively added to the official total COVID-19 death count for 2021.) | Total recovered | Total cases | Ref. |
| Day | Local | Imported | Total | New recoveries | New deaths | Active cases | In ICU | Total deaths | Total recovered | Total cases | Ref. |
|---|---|---|---|---|---|---|---|---|---|---|---|
| 1 | 4,548 | 161 | 4,709 | 7,816 | 2 | 19,893 | 15 | 1,520 | 1,697,352 | 1,718,765 | |
| 2 | 9,876 | 354 | 10,230 | 6,880 | 4 | 23,239 | 15 | 1,524 | 1,704,232 | 1,728,995 | |
| 3 | 6,942 | 289 | 7,231 | 5,327 | 4 | 25,139 | 14 | 1,528 | 1,709,559 | 1,736,226 | |
| 4 | 6,392 | 256 | 6,648 | 5,118 | 3 | 26,666 | 17 | 1,531 | 1,714,677 | 1,742,874 | |
| 5 | 6,048 | 222 | 6,270 | 10,265 | 3 | 22,668 | 18 | 1,534 | 1,724,942 | 1,749,144 | |
| 6 | 5,426 | 207 | 5,633 | 7,084 | 2 | 21,215 | 16 | 1,536 | 1,732,026 | 1,754,777 | |
| 7 | 4,625 | 173 | 4,798 | 7,018 | 3 | 18,992 | 24 | 1,539 | 1,739,044 | 1,759,575 | |
| 8 | 3,424 | 117 | 3,541 | 6,088 | 2 | 16,443 | 24 | 1,541 | 1,745,132 | 1,763,116 | |
| 9 | 7,707 | 258 | 7,965 | 5,799 | 1 | 18,608 | 27 | 1,542 | 1,750,931 | 1,771,081 | |
| 10 | 2,160 | 145 | 2,305 | 4,394 | 1 | 16,518 | 27 | 1,543 | 1,755,325 | 1,773,386 | |
| 11 | 7,262 | 514 | 7,776 | 3,960 | 3 | 20,331 | 22 | 1,546 | 1,759,285 | 1,781,162 | |
| 12 | 5,040 | 441 | 5,481 | 7,812 | 6 | 17,994 | 24 | 1,552 | 1,767,097 | 1,786,643 | |
| 13 | 4,097 | 306 | 4,403 | 2,667 | 4 | 19,726 | 22 | 1,556 | 1,769,764 | 1,791,046 | |
| 14 | 2,804 | 219 | 3,023 | 7,615 | 3 | 15,131 | 19 | 1,559 | 1,777,379 | 1,794,069 | |
| 15 | 2,508 | 157 | 2,665 | 5,399 | 1 | 12,396 | 20 | 1,560 | 1,782,778 | 1,796,734 | |
| 16 | 4,909 | 293 | 5,202 | 4,424 | 5 | 13,169 | 15 | 1,565 | 1,787,202 | 1,801,936 | |
| 17 | 3,559 | 203 | 3,762 | 3,173 | 2 | 13,756 | 11 | 1,567 | 1,790,375 | 1,805,698 | |
| 18 | 3,335 | 218 | 3,553 | 3,114 | 5 | 14,190 | 10 | 1,572 | 1,793,489 | 1,809,251 | |
| 19 | 2,837 | 167 | 3,004 | 5,423 | 4 | 11,767 | 7 | 1,576 | 1,798,912 | 1,812,255 | |
| 20 | 2,497 | 163 | 2,660 | 3,672 | 2 | 10,753 | 11 | 1,578 | 1,802,584 | 1,814,915 | |
| 21 | 1,848 | 103 | 1,951 | 3,405 | 2 | 9,297 | 10 | 1,580 | 1,805,989 | 1,816,866 | |
| 22 | 1,602 | 92 | 1,694 | 2,924 | 4 | 8,063 | 9 | 1,584 | 1,808,913 | 1,818,560 | |
| 23 | 3,406 | 221 | 3,627 | 2,791 | - | 8,899 | 8 | 1,584 | 1,811,704 | 1,822,187 | |
| 24 | 2,487 | 158 | 2,645 | 2,172 | 2 | 9,370 | 5 | 1,586 | 1,813,876 | 1,824,832 | |
| 25 | 2,265 | 132 | 2,397 | 1,915 | 1 | 9,851 | 6 | 1,587 | 1,815,791 | 1,827,229 | |
| 26 | 2,024 | 108 | 2,132 | 3,671 | 1 | 8,311 | 6 | 1,588 | 1,819,462 | 1,829,361 | |
| 27 | 1,846 | 125 | 1,971 | 2,616 | 2 | 7,664 | 8 | 1,590 | 1,822,078 | 1,831,332 | |
| 28 | 1,361 | 87 | 1,448 | 2,356 | 1 | 6,755 | 7 | 1,591 | 1,824,434 | 1,832,780 | |
| 29 | 1,308 | 102 | 1,410 | 2,137 | - | 6,028 | 8 | 1,591 | 1,826,571 | 1,834,190 | |
| 30 | 2,691 | 209 | 2,900 | 2,015 | 1 | 6,912 | 10 | 1,592 | 1,828,586 | 1,837,090 | |
| 31 | 1,974 | 180 | 2,154 | 1,631 | - | 7,435 | 9 | 1,592 | 1,830,217 | 1,839,244 | |
Notes:

- 1 August: HSA announced that it had granted interim authorisation for AstraZeneca's Evusheld COVID-19 treatment drug for use in Singapore, for those medically ineligible for vaccination.
- 2 August: MOH announced that the restrictions on visitors and the duration of visits to hospitals and residential care homes would be extended to 31 August.
- 24 August: It was announced that from 29 August onwards, masks would be mandatory only on public transport that has public access to it (e.g. all buses, taxis, trains excluding company or school buses), and in healthcare facilities.

== September ==
| Day | New cases | | | New recoveries | New deaths | Active cases | In ICU | Total deaths | Total recovered | Total cases | Ref. |
| Day | Local | Imported | Total | New recoveries | New deaths | Active cases | In ICU | Total deaths | Total recovered | Total cases | Ref. |
|---|---|---|---|---|---|---|---|---|---|---|---|
| 1 | 1,870 | 174 | 2,044 | 1,489 | 1 | 7,989 | 11 | 1,593 | 1,831,706 | 1,841,288 | |
| 2 | 1,802 | 146 | 1,948 | 2,891 | 1 | 7,045 | 11 | 1,594 | 1,834,597 | 1,843,236 | |
| 3 | 1,449 | 100 | 1,549 | 2,117 | - | 6,477 | 10 | 1,594 | 1,836,714 | 1,844,785 | |
| 4 | 1,236 | 73 | 1,309 | 1,971 | - | 5,815 | 9 | 1,594 | 1,838,685 | 1,846,094 | |
| 5 | 1,103 | 73 | 1,176 | 1,967 | 2 | 5,022 | 11 | 1,596 | 1,840,652 | 1,847,270 | |
| 6 | 2,562 | 183 | 2,745 | 1,577 | - | 6,190 | 10 | 1,596 | 1,842,229 | 1,850,015 | |
| 7 | 2,071 | 200 | 2,271 | 1,407 | 5 | 7,049 | 11 | 1,601 | 1,843,636 | 1,852,286 | |
| 8 | 1,936 | 233 | 2,169 | 1,285 | - | 7,933 | 10 | 1,601 | 1,844,921 | 1,854,455 | |
| 9 | 1,982 | 236 | 2,218 | 2,650 | 1 | 7,500 | 9 | 1,602 | 1,847,571 | 1,856,673 | |
| 10 | 1,657 | 167 | 1,824 | 2,221 | - | 7,103 | 9 | 1,602 | 1,849,792 | 1,858,497 | |
| 11 | 1,307 | 133 | 1,440 | 2,090 | - | 6,453 | 10 | 1,602 | 1,851,882 | 1,859,937 | |
| 12 | 1,300 | 153 | 1,453 | 2,145 | - | 5,761 | 10 | 1,602 | 1,854,027 | 1,861,390 | |
| 13 | 3,033 | 319 | 3,352 | 1,853 | - | 7,260 | 11 | 1,602 | 1,855,880 | 1,864,742 | |
| 14 | 2,166 | 260 | 2,426 | 1,512 | 2 | 8,172 | 9 | 1,604 | 1,857,392 | 1,867,168 | |
| 15 | 2,186 | 237 | 2,423 | 1,585 | 1 | 9,009 | 7 | 1,605 | 1,858,977 | 1,869,591 | |
| 16 | 2,091 | 218 | 2,309 | 3,306 | - | 8,012 | 8 | 1,605 | 1,862,283 | 1,871,900 | |
| 17 | 1,702 | 145 | 1,847 | 2,365 | 2 | 7,492 | 9 | 1,607 | 1,864,648 | 1,873,747 | |
| 18 | 1,415 | 113 | 1,528 | 2,333 | - | 6,687 | 6 | 1,607 | 1,866,981 | 1,875,275 | |
| 19 | 1,219 | 90 | 1,309 | 2,200 | 1 | 5,795 | 10 | 1,608 | 1,869,181 | 1,876,584 | |
| 20 | 2,978 | 244 | 3,222 | 1,926 | 1 | 7,090 | 11 | 1,609 | 1,871,107 | 1,879,806 | |
| 21 | 2,318 | 190 | 2,508 | 1,653 | - | 7,945 | 10 | 1,609 | 1,872,760 | 1,882,314 | |
| 22 | 2,333 | 212 | 2,545 | 1,446 | - | 9,044 | 8 | 1,609 | 1,874,206 | 1,884,859 | |
| 23 | 2,174 | 169 | 2,343 | 3,198 | - | 8,189 | 7 | 1,609 | 1,877,404 | 1,887,202 | |
| 24 | 2,200 | 142 | 2,342 | 2,443 | 1 | 8,087 | 8 | 1,610 | 1,879,847 | 1,889,544 | |
| 25 | 1,706 | 91 | 1,797 | 2,417 | - | 7,467 | 9 | 1,610 | 1,882,264 | 1,891,341 | |
| 26 | 1,522 | 84 | 1,606 | 2,275 | 5 | 6,793 | 9 | 1,615 | 1,884,539 | 1,892,947 | |
| 27 | 4,066 | 294 | 4,360 | 2,367 | 2 | 8,784 | 7 | 1,617 | 1,886,906 | 1,897,307 | |
| 28 | 3,214 | 240 | 3,454 | 1,846 | - | 10,392 | 6 | 1,617 | 1,888,752 | 1,900,761 | |
| 29 | 3,219 | 212 | 3,431 | 1,707 | - | 12,116 | 9 | 1,617 | 1,890,459 | 1,904,192 | |
| 30 | 3,500 | 215 | 3,715 | 4,355 | 1 | 11,475 | 8 | 1,618 | 1,894,814 | 1,907,907 | |

== October ==
| Day | New cases | | | New recoveries | New deaths | Active cases | In ICU | Total deaths | Total recovered | Total cases | Ref. |
| Day | Local | Imported | Total | New recoveries | New deaths | Active cases | In ICU | Total deaths | Total recovered | Total cases | Ref. |
|---|---|---|---|---|---|---|---|---|---|---|---|
| 1 | 3,363 | 147 | 3,510 | 3,280 | 1 | 11,704 | 8 | 1,619 | 1,898,094 | 1,911,417 | |
| 2 | 2,758 | 105 | 2,863 | 3,249 | 1 | 11,317 | 8 | 1,620 | 1,901,343 | 1,914,280 | |
| 3 | 2,587 | 126 | 2,713 | 3,500 | 2 | 10,528 | 9 | 1,622 | 1,904,843 | 1,916,993 | |
| 4 | 6,888 | 258 | 7,146 | 3,518 | 2 | 14,154 | 11 | 1,624 | 1,908,361 | 1,924,139 | |
| 5 | 5,708 | 215 | 5,923 | 2,935 | - | 17,142 | 11 | 1,624 | 1,911,296 | 1,930,062 | |
| 6 | 5,982 | 226 | 6,208 | 2,863 | 1 | 20,486 | 13 | 1,625 | 1,914,159 | 1,936,270 | |
| 7 | 5,710 | 224 | 5,934 | 6,985 | 3 | 19,432 | 13 | 1,628 | 1,921,144 | 1,942,204 | |
| 8 | 6,008 | 190 | 6,198 | 5,691 | 1 | 19,938 | 8 | 1,629 | 1,926,835 | 1,948,402 | |
| 9 | 4,683 | 112 | 4,795 | 5,868 | - | 18,865 | 10 | 1,629 | 1,932,703 | 1,953,197 | |
| 10 | 4,589 | 130 | 4,719 | 6,097 | 3 | 17,484 | 10 | 1,632 | 1,938,800 | 1,957,916 | |
| 11 | 11,399 | 333 | 11,732 | 5,872 | 2 | 23,342 | 11 | 1,634 | 1,944,672 | 1,969,648 | |
| 12 | 9,321 | 290 | 9,611 | 4,837 | 2 | 28,114 | 11 | 1,636 | 1,949,509 | 1,979,259 | |
| 13 | 9,249 | 252 | 9,501 | 4,695 | 3 | 32,917 | 13 | 1,639 | 1,954,204 | 1,988,760 | |
| 14 | 8,763 | 324 | 9,087 | 11,688 | 2 | 30,314 | 9 | 1,641 | 1,965,892 | 1,997,847 | |
| 15 | 7,764 | 273 | 8,037 | 9,023 | - | 29,328 | 13 | 1,641 | 1,974,915 | 2,005,884 | |
| 16 | 6,026 | 155 | 6,181 | 8,980 | 3 | 26,526 | 13 | 1,644 | 1,983,895 | 2,012,065 | |
| 17 | 5,028 | 168 | 5,196 | 8,794 | 2 | 22,926 | 15 | 1,646 | 1,992,689 | 2,017,261 | |
| 18 | 11,553 | 381 | 11,934 | 8,097 | 5 | 26,758 | 14 | 1,651 | 2,000,786 | 2,029,195 | |
| 19 | 8,419 | 333 | 8,752 | 6,324 | 3 | 29,183 | 14 | 1,654 | 2,007,110 | 2,037,947 | |
| 20 | 7,865 | 311 | 8,176 | 5,678 | 5 | 31,676 | 13 | 1,659 | 2,012,788 | 2,046,123 | |
| 21 | 6,985 | 262 | 7,247 | 11,934 | 1 | 26,988 | 15 | 1,660 | 2,024,722 | 2,053,370 | |
| 22 | 6,082 | 257 | 6,339 | 8,631 | - | 24,696 | 16 | 1,660 | 2,033,353 | 2,059,709 | |
| 23 | 4,280 | 174 | 4,454 | 7,893 | 2 | 21,255 | 9 | 1,662 | 2,041,246 | 2,064,163 | |
| 24 | 3,475 | 152 | 3,627 | 7,456 | 1 | 17,425 | 10 | 1,663 | 2,048,702 | 2,067,790 | |
| 25 | 2,820 | 174 | 2,994 | 6,473 | 3 | 13,943 | 9 | 1,666 | 2,055,175 | 2,070,784 | |
| 26 | 8,999 | 558 | 9,557 | 4,677 | 2 | 18,821 | 15 | 1,668 | 2,059,852 | 2,080,341 | |
| 27 | 5,768 | 479 | 6,247 | 4,026 | 2 | 21,040 | 17 | 1,670 | 2,063,878 | 2,086,588 | |
| 28 | 4,926 | 375 | 5,301 | 3,381 | 2 | 22,958 | 16 | 1,672 | 2,067,259 | 2,091,889 | |
| 29 | 4,273 | 358 | 4,631 | 9,917 | 2 | 17,670 | 12 | 1,674 | 2,077,176 | 2,096,520 | |
| 30 | 3,044 | 196 | 3,240 | 5,634 | 2 | 15,274 | 13 | 1,676 | 2,082,810 | 2,099,760 | |
| 31 | 2,443 | 169 | 2,612 | 5,025 | 4 | 12,857 | 15 | 1,680 | 2,087,835 | 2,102,372 | |

- 11 October: MOH announced that it would bring forward the rollout of the bivalent Moderna/Spikevax COVID-19 vaccine three days to 14 October, due to the spike in infections from the BA.2.10/XBB variant.

== November ==
| Day | New cases | | | New recoveries | New deaths | Active cases | In ICU | Total deaths | Total recovered | Total cases | Ref. |
| Day | Local | Imported | Total | New recoveries | New deaths | Active cases | In ICU | Total deaths | Total recovered | Total cases | Ref. |
|---|---|---|---|---|---|---|---|---|---|---|---|
| 1 | 5,319 | 333 | 5,652 | 4,837 | - | 13,672 | 19 | 1,680 | 2,092,672 | 2,108,024 | |
| 2 | 3,799 | 287 | 4,086 | 3,364 | 2 | 14,392 | 16 | 1,682 | 2,096,036 | 2,112,110 | |
| 3 | 3,265 | 246 | 3,511 | 2,925 | 1 | 14,977 | 16 | 1,683 | 2,098,961 | 2,115,621 | |
| 4 | 2,941 | 187 | 3,128 | 5,808 | 2 | 12,295 | 16 | 1,685 | 2,104,769 | 2,118,749 | |
| 5 | 2,547 | 139 | 2,686 | 4,003 | 1 | 10,977 | 16 | 1,686 | 2,108,772 | 2,121,435 | |
| 6 | 1,779 | 114 | 1,893 | 3,548 | 1 | 9,321 | 15 | 1,687 | 2,112,320 | 2,123,328 | |
From 7 November, MOH's main page only reports the 7-day moving average of cases, with number of daily cases displayed on the weekly situation report.
| 7 | 1,567 | 109 | 1,676 | 3,119 | 3 | 7,875 | 16 | 1,690 | 2,115,439 | 2,125,004 | |
| 8 | 3,307 | 261 | 3,568 | 2,907 | 1 | 8,535 | 14 | 1,691 | 2,118,346 | 2,128,572 | |
| 9 | 2,777 | 205 | 2,982 | 1,970 | 2 | 9,545 | 14 | 1,693 | 2,120,316 | 2,131,554 | |
| 10 | 2,548 | 217 | 2,765 | 1,886 | - | 10,424 | 14 | 1,693 | 2,122,202 | 2,134,319 | |
| 11 | 2,164 | 175 | 2,339 | 3,631 | - | 9,132 | 12 | 1,693 | 2,125,833 | 2,136,658 | |
| 12 | 1,807 | 133 | 1,940 | 2,864 | 1 | 8,207 | 12 | 1,694 | 2,128,697 | 2,138,598 | |
| 13 | 1,390 | 111 | 1,501 | 2,699 | 1 | 7,008 | 16 | 1,695 | 2,131,396 | 2,140,099 | |
| 14 | 1,215 | 97 | 1,312 | 2,326 | 2 | 5,992 | 15 | 1,697 | 2,133,722 | 2,141,411 | |
| 15 | 2,839 | 272 | 3,111 | 2,033 | - | 7,070 | 15 | 1,697 | 2,135,755 | 2,144,522 | |
| 16 | 1,974 | 210 | 2,184 | 1,636 | 1 | 7,617 | 13 | 1,698 | 2,137,391 | 2,146,706 | |
| 17 | 1,907 | 181 | 2,088 | 1,438 | 1 | 8,266 | 11 | 1,699 | 2,138,829 | 2,148,794 | |
| 18 | 1,753 | 155 | 1,908 | 3,094 | - | 7,080 | 8 | 1,699 | 2,141,923 | 2,150,702 | |
| 19 | 1,537 | 129 | 1,666 | 2,172 | - | 6,574 | 7 | 1,699 | 2,144,095 | 2,152,368 | |
| 20 | 1,082 | 85 | 1,167 | 2,041 | 1 | 5,699 | 8 | 1,700 | 2,146,136 | 2,153,535 | |
| 21 | 1,026 | 72 | 1,098 | 1,911 | - | 4,886 | 9 | 1,700 | 2,148,047 | 2,154,633 | |
| 22 | 2,222 | 166 | 2,388 | 1,714 | 1 | 5,559 | 8 | 1,701 | 2,149,761 | 2,157,021 | |
| 23 | 1,556 | 132 | 1,688 | 1,264 | - | 5,983 | 8 | 1,701 | 2,151,025 | 2,158,709 | |
| 24 | 1,490 | 125 | 1,615 | 1,175 | - | 6,423 | 9 | 1,701 | 2,152,200 | 2,160,324 | |
| 25 | 1,232 | 117 | 1,349 | 2,408 | 1 | 5,363 | 11 | 1,702 | 2,154,608 | 2,161,673 | |
| 26 | 1,194 | 96 | 1,290 | 1,632 | - | 5,021 | 13 | 1,702 | 2,156,240 | 2,162,963 | |
| 27 | 837 | 72 | 909 | 1,588 | - | 4,342 | 13 | 1,702 | 2,157,828 | 2,163,872 | |
| 28 | 754 | 63 | 817 | 1,351 | - | 3,808 | 10 | 1,702 | 2,159,179 | 2,164,689 | |
| 29 | 1,689 | 149 | 1,838 | 1,325 | 1 | 4,320 | 9 | 1,703 | 2,160,504 | 2,166,527 | |
| 30 | 1,236 | 134 | 1,370 | 961 | - | 4,729 | 9 | 1,703 | 2,161,465 | 2,167,897 | |

- 8 November: Health Minister Ong Ye Kung announced that hospitals would no longer set aside entire wards for COVID-19 patients.
- 9 November: MOH announced that restrictions on visitors to hospital wards and care homes would be extended to 23 November.

== December ==
| Day | New cases | | | New recoveries | New deaths | Active cases | In ICU | Total deaths | Total recovered | Total cases | Ref. |
| Day | Local | Imported | Total | New recoveries | New deaths | Active cases | In ICU | Total deaths | Total recovered | Total cases | Ref. |
|---|---|---|---|---|---|---|---|---|---|---|---|
| 1 | 1,186 | 118 | 1,304 | 897 | - | 5,136 | 7 | 1,703 | 2,162,362 | 2,169,201 | |
| 2 | 1,202 | 95 | 1,297 | 1,819 | 2 | 4,612 | 8 | 1,705 | 2,164,181 | 2,170,498 | |
| 3 | 971 | 81 | 1,052 | 1,360 | - | 4,304 | 8 | 1,705 | 2,165,541 | 2,171,550 | |
| 4 | 777 | 69 | 846 | 1,248 | - | 3,902 | 9 | 1,705 | 2,166,789 | 2,172,396 | |
| 5 | 718 | 58 | 776 | 1,292 | 1 | 3,385 | 10 | 1,706 | 2,168,081 | 2,173,172 | |
| 6 | 1,681 | 136 | 1,817 | 1,107 | - | 4,095 | 8 | 1,706 | 2,169,188 | 2,174,989 | |
| 7 | 1,225 | 124 | 1,349 | 914 | 1 | 4,529 | 5 | 1,707 | 2,170,102 | 2,176,338 | |
| 8 | 1,240 | 123 | 1,363 | 829 | - | 5,063 | 6 | 1,707 | 2,170,931 | 2,177,701 | |
| 9 | 1,227 | 116 | 1,343 | 1,809 | - | 4,597 | 5 | 1,707 | 2,172,740 | 2,179,044 | |
| 10 | 991 | 111 | 1,102 | 1,344 | - | 4,355 | 4 | 1,707 | 2,174,084 | 2,180,146 | |
| 11 | 827 | 75 | 902 | 1,323 | - | 3,934 | 6 | 1,707 | 2,175,407 | 2,181,048 | |
| 12 | 684 | 56 | 740 | 1,284 | - | 3,390 | 6 | 1,707 | 2,176,691 | 2,181,788 | |
| 13 | 1,676 | 141 | 1,817 | 1,156 | 1 | 4,050 | 6 | 1,708 | 2,177,847 | 2,183,605 | |
| 14 | 1,217 | 130 | 1,347 | 895 | - | 4,502 | 6 | 1,708 | 2,178,742 | 2,184,952 | |
| 15 | 1,145 | 117 | 1,262 | 795 | 1 | 4,968 | 5 | 1,709 | 2,179,537 | 2,186,214 | |
| 16 | 1,132 | 113 | 1,245 | 1,788 | - | 4,425 | 5 | 1,709 | 2,181,325 | 2,187,459 | |
| 17 | 958 | 94 | 1,052 | 1,327 | - | 4,150 | 4 | 1,709 | 2,182,652 | 2,188,511 | |
| 18 | 765 | 73 | 838 | 1,212 | - | 3,776 | 5 | 1,709 | 2,183,864 | 2,189,349 | |
| 19 | 647 | 61 | 708 | 1,221 | 1 | 3,262 | 6 | 1,710 | 2,185,085 | 2,190,057 | |
| 20 | 1,389 | 151 | 1,540 | 1,053 | - | 3,749 | 6 | 1,710 | 2,186,138 | 2,191,597 | |
| 21 | 955 | 138 | 1,093 | 867 | - | 3,975 | 6 | 1,710 | 2,187,005 | 2,192,690 | |
| 22 | 1,059 | 141 | 1,200 | 754 | - | 4,421 | 5 | 1,710 | 2,187,759 | 2,193,890 | |
| 23 | 946 | 127 | 1,073 | 1,530 | - | 3,964 | 5 | 1,710 | 2,189,289 | 2,194,963 | |
| 24 | 915 | 102 | 1,017 | 1,109 | - | 3,872 | 4 | 1,710 | 2,190,398 | 2,195,980 | |
| 25 | 631 | 79 | 710 | 1,140 | - | 3,442 | 4 | 1,710 | 2,191,538 | 2,196,690 | |
| 26 | 321 | 73 | 394 | 1,034 | 1 | 2,801 | 4 | 1,711 | 2,192,572 | 2,197,084 | |
| 27 | 463 | 143 | 606 | 984 | - | 2,423 | 4 | 1,711 | 2,193,556 | 2,197,690 | |
| 28 | 1,224 | 323 | 1,547 | 712 | - | 3,258 | 4 | 1,711 | 2,194,268 | 2,199,237 | |
| 29 | 883 | 233 | 1,116 | 477 | - | 3,897 | 4 | 1,711 | 2,194,745 | 2,200,353 | |
| 30 | 830 | 196 | 1,026 | 654 | - | 4,269 | 4 | 1,711 | 2,195,399 | 2,201,379 | |
| 31 | 655 | 180 | 835 | 1,543 | - | 3,561 | 3 | 1,711 | 2,196,942 | 2,202,214 | |
