= Timeline of the COVID-19 pandemic in Singapore (2023) =

2023 Timeline of COVID-19 in Singapore

The following is a timeline of the COVID-19 pandemic in Singapore in 2023.

== January ==
Day	New cases			New recoveries	New deaths	Active cases	In ICU	Total deaths	Total recovered	Total cases	Ref.
Day	Local	Imported	Total	New recoveries	New deaths	Active cases	In ICU	Total deaths	Total recovered	Total cases	Ref.
1	414	128	542	1,083	-	3,020	2	1,711	2,198,025	2,202,756	
2	305	85	390	968	1	2,441	2	1,712	2,198,993	2,203,146	
3	438	118	556	820	-	2,177	3	1,712	2,199,813	2,203,702	
4	1,166	369	1,535	597	-	3,115	3	1,712	2,200,410	2,205,237	
5	710	206	916	429	-	3,602	3	1,712	2,200,839	2,206,153	
6	657	176	833	621	-	3,814	2	1,712	2,201,460	2,206,986	
7	564	120	684	1,493	-	3,005	2	1,712	2,202,953	2,207,670	
8	481	65	546	852	1	2,698	3	1,713	2,203,805	2,208,216	
9	323	62	385	801	1	2,281	2	1,714	2,204,606	2,208,601	
10	819	91	910	642	-	2,549	2	1,714	2,205,248	2,209,511	
11	523	75	598	525	3	2,619	3	1,717	2,205,773	2,210,109	
12	465	59	524	424	-	2,719	3	1,717	2,206,197	2,210,633	
13	446	52	498	923	-	2,294	3	1,717	2,207,120	2,211,131	
14	378	37	415	617	-	2,092	3	1,717	2,207,737	2,211,546	
15	287	22	309	505	-	1,896	3	1,717	2,208,242	2,211,855	
16	255	21	276	497	-	1,675	2	1,717	2,208,739	2,212,131	
17	504	49	553	449	-	1,779	2	1,717	2,209,188	2,212,684	
18	384	23	407	368	1	1,817	1	1,718	2,209,556	2,213,091	
19	311	33	344	295	1	1,865	1	1,719	2,209,851	2,213,435	
20	328	32	360	617	1	1,607	1	1,720	2,210,468	2,213,795	
21	249	20	269	449	-	1,427	1	1,720	2,210,917	2,214,064	
22	154	16	170	359	-	1,238	2	1,720	2,211,276	2,214,234	
23	72	6	78	344	-	972	1	1,720	2,211,620	2,214,312	
24	113	12	125	292	-	805	1	1,720	2,211,912	2,214,437	
25	157	7	164	196	-	773	1	1,720	2,212,108	2,214,601	
26	437	71	508	121	-	1,160	1	1,720	2,212,229	2,215,109	
27	336	82	418	177	-	1,401	2	1,720	2,212,406	2,215,527	
28	302	60	362	200	-	1,563	2	1,720	2,212,606	2,215,889	
29	242	54	296	471	1	1,387	1	1,721	2,213,077	2,216,185	
30	199	74	273	394	1	1,265	-	1,722	2,213,471	2,216,458	
31	510	142	652	318	-	1,599	-	1,722	2,213,789	2,217,110	

- 4 January: Eligible individuals of all age groups can walk into any vaccination centre without booking an appointment.
- 9 January: In the wake of China's reopening, Health Minister Ong Ye Kung announced that travelers from China to Singapore would not be required to undergo pre-departure COVID-19 testing.
- 16 January: The Pfizer-BioNTech/Comirnaty vaccine will be available to children aged six months to four years.

== February ==
Day	New cases	New recoveries	New deaths	Active cases	In ICU	Total deaths	Total recovered	Total cases
From 1 February, the weekly situation report will be discontinued.
1	465	305	-	1,759	-	1,722	2,214,094	2,217,575
2	475	283	-	1,951	-	1,722	2,214,377	2,218,050
3	458	637	-	1,772	-	1,722	2,215,014	2,218,508
4	373	446	-	1,699	-	1,722	2,215,460	2,218,881
5	299	453	-	1,545	-	1,722	2,215,913	2,219,180
6	251	446	-	1,350	1	1,722	2,216,359	2,219,431
7	631	363	-	1,618	-	1,722	2,216,722	2,220,062
8	472	270	-	1,820	-	1,722	2,216,992	2,220,534
9	465	303	-	1,982	-	1,722	2,217,295	2,220,999
10	439	607	-	1,814	-	1,722	2,217,902	2,221,438
11	324	512	-	1,626	-	1,722	2,218,414	2,221,762
12	244	468	-	1,402	1	1,722	2,218,882	2,222,006
From 13 February, daily reports on COVID-19 infection statistics will be discontinued.

- 9 February:
  - MOH announced that from 13 February, the DORSCON level would be lowered to Green; mask-wearing would no longer be mandatory on public transport and some healthcare and residential care settings (but would still be required for hospital wards, clinics and nursing homes). The Multi-ministry Task Force (MTF) would also be stood down.
  - MOH announced that all COVID-19 border restrictions would be lifted from 13 February onwards.
  - It was announced that from 1 March, COVID-19 guidelines for worker dormitories would be recalibrated to align with those for the community.
  - Users of TraceTogether may uninstall the app and return any physical tokens from 13 February onwards, with community centers ceasing issuing of tokens. The use of SafeEntry by businesses will also cease.
