= Tixagevimab/cilgavimab =

Monoclonal antibody treatment for COVID-19

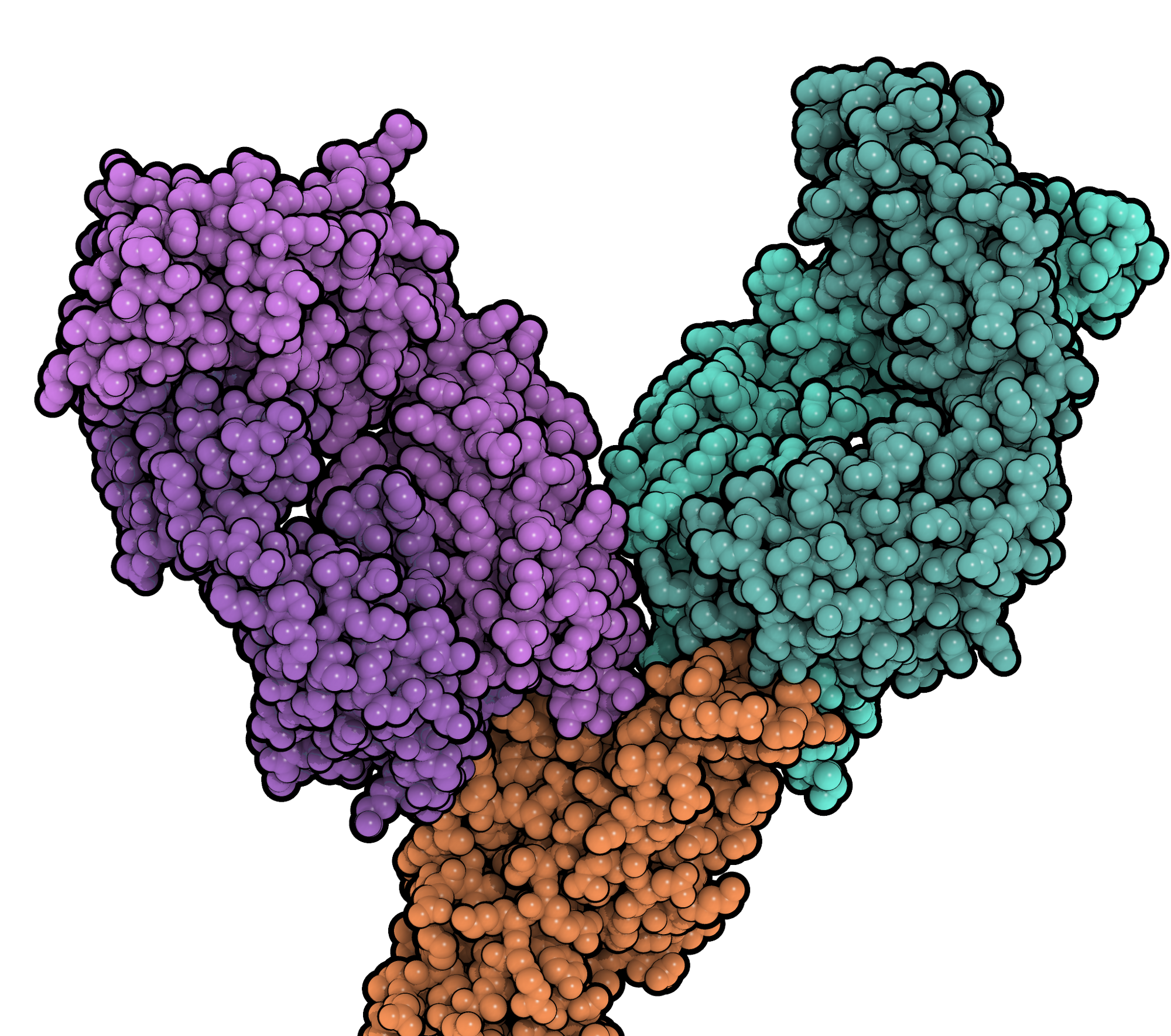
- Tixagevimab (teal, right) and cilgavimab (purple, left) binding the spike protein RBD. From PDB: 7L7E.

Combination of
- Tixagevimab: Monoclonal antibody
- Cilgavimab: Monoclonal antibody

Clinical data
- Trade names: Evusheld
- Other names: AZD7442
- AHFS/Drugs.com: Monograph
- MedlinePlus: a621058
- License data: US DailyMed: Tixagevimab
- Pregnancy category: AU: B2
- Routes of administration: Intramuscular
- ATC code: J06BD03 (WHO)

Legal status
- Legal status: AU: S4 (Prescription only); CA: ℞-only / Schedule D; UK: POM (Prescription only); EU: Rx-Only

Identifiers
- KEGG: D12262

Tixagevimab
Monoclonal antibody
- Type: ?

Clinical data
- Drug class: Antiviral
- ATC code: None

Identifiers
- CAS Number: 2420564-02-7
- DrugBank: DB16394
- UNII: F0LZ415Z3B
- KEGG: D11993

Chemical and physical data
- Formula: C_{6488}H_{10034}N_{1746}O_{2038}S_{50}
- Molar mass: 146706.82 g·mol^{−1}

Cilgavimab
Monoclonal antibody
- Type: ?

Clinical data
- Drug class: Antiviral
- ATC code: None

Identifiers
- CAS Number: 2420563-99-9
- DrugBank: DB16393
- UNII: 1KUR4BN70F
- KEGG: D11994

Chemical and physical data
- Formula: C_{6626}H_{10218}N_{1750}O_{2078}S_{44}
- Molar mass: 149053.44 g·mol^{−1}

Tixagevimab/cilgavimab, sold under the brand name Evusheld, is a combination of two human monoclonal antibodies, tixagevimab (AZD8895) and cilgavimab (AZD1061) targeted against the surface spike protein of SARS-CoV-2 used to prevent COVID-19. It is being developed by British-Swedish multinational pharmaceutical and biotechnology company AstraZeneca. It is co-packaged and given as two separate consecutive intramuscular injections (one injection per monoclonal antibody, given in immediate succession).

== Development ==
In 2020, researchers at Vanderbilt University Medical Center discovered particularly potent monoclonal antibodies, isolated from COVID-19 patients infected with a SARS-CoV-2 circulating at that time. Initially designated COV2-2196 and COV2-2130, antibody engineering was used to transfer their SARS-CoV-2 binding specificity to IgG scaffolds that would last longer in the body, and these engineered antibodies were named AZD8895 (tixagevimab) and AZD1061 (cilgavimab), respectively (and the combination was called AZD7442).

To evaluate the potential of the antibodies as monoclonal antibody based prophylaxis (prevention), the 'Provent' clinical trial enrolled 5,000 high risk but not yet infected individuals and monitored them for 15 months. The trial reported that those receiving the cocktail showed a 77% reduction in symptomatic COVID-19 and that there were no severe cases or deaths. AstraZeneca also found that the antibody cocktail "neutralizes recent emergent SARS-CoV-2 viral variants" including the Delta variant, and the Omicron variant.

In contrast to pre-exposure prophylaxis, the Storm Chaser study of already-exposed people (post-exposure prophylaxis) did not meet its primary endpoint, which was prevention of symptomatic COVID-19 in people already exposed. AZD7442 was administered to 1,000 volunteers who had recently been exposed to COVID.

== Society and culture ==
=== Legal status ===
In October 2021, the Committee for Medicinal Products for Human Use (CHMP) of the European Medicines Agency (EMA) started a rolling review of tixagevimab/cilgavimab, which is being developed by AstraZeneca AB, for the prevention of COVID-19 in adults. It was approved for medical use in the European Union in March 2022.

Also in October 2021, AstraZeneca requested emergency use authorization for tixagevimab/cilgavimab to prevent COVID-19 from the US Food and Drug Administration (FDA).

In November 2021, Bahrain authorized it for emergency use.

In December 2021, the US FDA granted emergency use authorization (EUA) of this combination to prevent COVID-19 (before exposure) in people with weakened immunity or who cannot be fully vaccinated due to a history of severe reaction to coronavirus vaccines. and in certain people aged 12 years of age and older weighing at least 40 kilograms (88 lb). The product is only authorized for those individuals who are not infected with the SARS-CoV-2 virus and who have not recently been exposed to an individual infected with SARS-CoV-2. The EUA was revoked in January 2023.

In March 2022, the Committee for Medicinal Products for Human Use of the European Medicines Agency adopted a positive opinion, recommending the granting of a marketing authorization for the medicinal product Evusheld, intended for the pre-exposure prophylaxis of COVID-19 in adults and adolescents aged 12 years and older weighing at least 40 kilograms (88 lb). The applicant for this medicinal product is AstraZeneca AB. It has since been granted approval for use in the UK and in the European Union.

In January 2023, the FDA revised the EUA for Evusheld to limit its use to when the combined frequency of non-susceptible SARS-CoV-2 variants nationally is less than or equal to 90%. Based on this revision, Evusheld is not authorized for use in the US.
