= Timeline of the COVID-19 pandemic in Belarus =

Timeline of the COVID-19 pandemic in Belarus may refer to:

- Timeline of the COVID-19 pandemic in Belarus (2020)
- Timeline of the COVID-19 pandemic in Belarus (2021)
- Timeline of the COVID-19 pandemic in Belarus (2022)
