= Timeline of the COVID-19 pandemic in Belarus (2021) =

This article documents the timeline of transmission of COVID-19 during the pandemic in Belarus in 2021.

== Timeline ==
=== January 2021 ===
January 2021
On 1 January, a total of 196,223 confirmed cases were reported, including 178,102 recoveries and 1,433 deaths. More than 4,015,000 COVID-19 tests had been conducted in Belarus to date.

On 2 January, a total of 198,125 confirmed cases were reported, including 181,109 recoveries and 1,442 deaths. More than 4,037,000 COVID-19 tests had been conducted in Belarus to date.

On 3 January, a total of 199,962 confirmed cases were reported, including 182,630 recoveries and 1,451 deaths. More than 4,042,000 COVID-19 tests had been conducted in Belarus to date.

On 4 January, a total of 201,831 confirmed cases were reported, including 183,625 recoveries and 1,461 deaths. More than 4,047,000 COVID-19 tests had been conducted in Belarus to date.

On 5 January, a total of 203,104 confirmed cases were reported, including 184,574 recoveries and 1,471 deaths. More than 4,050,000 COVID-19 tests had been conducted in Belarus to date.

On 6 January, a total of 204,958 confirmed cases were reported, including 186,394 recoveries and 1,480 deaths. More than 4,068,000 COVID-19 tests had been conducted in Belarus to date.

On 7 January, a total of 206,796 confirmed cases were reported, including 188,789 recoveries and 1,489 deaths. More than 4,093,000 COVID-19 tests had been conducted in Belarus to date.

On 8 January, a total of 208,601 confirmed cases were reported, including 190,966 recoveries and 1,498 deaths. More than 4,114,000 COVID-19 tests had been conducted in Belarus to date.

On 9 January, a total of 210,368 confirmed cases were reported, including 192,620 recoveries and 1,507 deaths. More than 4,117,000 COVID-19 tests had been conducted in Belarus to date.

On 10 January, a total of 212,201 confirmed cases were reported, including 194,984 recoveries and 1,517 deaths. More than 4,130,000 COVID-19 tests had been conducted in Belarus to date.

On 11 January, a total of 213,993 confirmed cases were reported, including 196,284 recoveries and 1,526 deaths. More than 4,139,000 COVID-19 tests had been conducted in Belarus to date.

On 12 January, a total of 215,724 confirmed cases were reported, including 197,851 recoveries and 1,535 deaths. More than 4,144,000 COVID-19 tests had been conducted in Belarus to date.

On 13 January, a total of 217,696 confirmed cases were reported, including 200,132 recoveries and 1,544 deaths. More than 4,166,000 COVID-19 tests had been conducted in Belarus to date.

On 14 January, a total of 219,663 confirmed cases were reported, including 202,446 recoveries and 1,554 deaths. More than 4,191,000 COVID-19 tests had been conducted in Belarus to date.

On 15 January, a total of 221,604 confirmed cases were reported, including 204,500 recoveries and 1,564 deaths. More than 4,216,000 COVID-19 tests had been conducted in Belarus to date.

On 16 January, a total of 223,537 confirmed cases were reported, including 206,676 recoveries and 1,573 deaths. More than 4,238,000 COVID-19 tests had been conducted in Belarus to date.

On 17 January, a total of 225,461 confirmed cases were reported, including 209,208 recoveries and 1,582 deaths. More than 4,259,000 COVID-19 tests had been conducted in Belarus to date.

On 18 January, a total of 227,360 confirmed cases were reported, including 210,779 recoveries and 1,591 deaths. More than 4,271,000 COVID-19 tests had been conducted in Belarus to date.

On 19 January, a total of 228,716 confirmed cases were reported, including 212,074 recoveries and 1,601 deaths. More than 4,280,000 COVID-19 tests had been conducted in Belarus to date.

On 20 January, a total of 230,494 confirmed cases were reported, including 214,366 recoveries and 1,610 deaths. More than 4,295,000 COVID-19 tests had been conducted in Belarus to date.

On 21 January, a total of 232,298 confirmed cases were reported, including 216,744 recoveries and 1,619 deaths. More than 4,311,000 COVID-19 tests had been conducted in Belarus to date.

On 22 January, a total of 234,111 confirmed cases were reported, including 218,831 recoveries and 1,628 deaths. More than 4,330,000 COVID-19 tests had been conducted in Belarus to date.

On 23 January, a total of 235,859 confirmed cases were reported, including 220,912 recoveries and 1,639 deaths. More than 4,348,000 COVID-19 tests had been conducted in Belarus to date.

On 24 January, a total of 237,611 confirmed cases were reported, including 223,553 recoveries and 1,649 deaths. More than 4,365,000 COVID-19 tests had been conducted in Belarus to date.

On 25 January, a total of 238,635 confirmed cases were reported, including 224,171 recoveries and 1,658 deaths. More than 4,375,000 COVID-19 tests had been conducted in Belarus to date.

On 26 January, a total of 239,482 confirmed cases were reported, including 224,925 recoveries and 1,668 deaths. More than 4,383,000 COVID-19 tests had been conducted in Belarus to date.

On 27 January, a total of 241,133 confirmed cases were reported, including 227,068 recoveries and 1,678 deaths. More than 4,399,000 COVID-19 tests had been conducted in Belarus to date.

On 28 January, a total of 242,851 confirmed cases were reported, including 229,199 recoveries and 1,688 deaths. More than 4,415,000 COVID-19 tests had been conducted in Belarus to date.

On 29 January, a total of 244,718 confirmed cases were reported, including 231,399 recoveries and 1,698 deaths. More than 4,435,000 COVID-19 tests had been conducted in Belarus to date.

On 30 January, a total of 246,570 confirmed cases were reported, including 233,499 recoveries and 1,708 deaths. More than 4,453,000 COVID-19 tests had been conducted in Belarus to date.

On 31 January, a total of 248,336 confirmed cases were reported, including 235,838 recoveries and 1,718 deaths. More than 4,472,000 COVID-19 tests had been conducted in Belarus to date.

=== February 2021 ===
February 2021
On 1 February, a total of 249,295 confirmed cases were reported, including 236,516 recoveries and 1,728 deaths. More than 4,482,000 COVID-19 tests had been conducted in Belarus to date.

On 2 February, a total of 249,994 confirmed cases were reported, including 237,178 recoveries and 1,737 deaths. More than 4,488,000 COVID-19 tests had been conducted in Belarus to date.

On 3 February, a total of 251,705 confirmed cases were reported, including 239,191 recoveries and 1,746 deaths. More than 4,502,000 COVID-19 tests had been conducted in Belarus to date.

On 4 February, a total of 253,413 confirmed cases were reported, including 241,150 recoveries and 1,755 deaths. More than 4,519,000 COVID-19 tests had been conducted in Belarus to date.

On 5 February, a total of 255,172 confirmed cases were reported, including 243,144 recoveries and 1,764 deaths. More than 4,538,000 COVID-19 tests had been conducted in Belarus to date.

On 6 February, a total of 256,959 confirmed cases were reported, including 244,941 recoveries and 1,773 deaths. More than 4,557,000 COVID-19 tests had been conducted in Belarus to date.

On 7 February, a total of 258,691 confirmed cases were reported, including 247,177 recoveries and 1,783 deaths. More than 4,577,000 COVID-19 tests had been conducted in Belarus to date.

On 8 February, a total of 259,499 confirmed cases were reported, including 247,703 recoveries and 1,792 deaths. More than 4,586,000 COVID-19 tests had been conducted in Belarus to date.

On 9 February, a total of 260,060 confirmed cases were reported, including 248,064 recoveries and 1,801 deaths. More than 4,593,000 COVID-19 tests had been conducted in Belarus to date.

On 10 February, a total of 261,859 confirmed cases were reported, including 250,078 recoveries and 1,811 deaths. More than 4,607,000 COVID-19 tests had been conducted in Belarus to date.

On 11 February, a total of 263,551 confirmed cases were reported, including 252,068 recoveries and 1,820 deaths. More than 4,624,000 COVID-19 tests had been conducted in Belarus to date.

On 12 February, a total of 265,284 confirmed cases were reported, including 254,032 recoveries and 1,830 deaths. More than 4,643,000 COVID-19 tests had been conducted in Belarus to date.

On 13 February, a total of 267,029 confirmed cases were reported, including 255,980 recoveries and 1,840 deaths. More than 4,662,000 COVID-19 tests had been conducted in Belarus to date.

On 14 February, a total of 268,687 confirmed cases were reported, including 258,202 recoveries and 1,849 deaths. More than 4,681,000 COVID-19 tests had been conducted in Belarus to date.

On 15 February, a total of 269,787 confirmed cases were reported, including 259,029 recoveries and 1,858 deaths. More than 4,690,000 COVID-19 tests had been conducted in Belarus to date.

On 16 February, a total of 270,921 confirmed cases were reported, including 260,057 recoveries and 1,867 deaths. More than 4,698,000 COVID-19 tests had been conducted in Belarus to date.

On 17 February, a total of 272,273 confirmed cases were reported, including 261,568 recoveries and 1,876 deaths. More than 4,715,000 COVID-19 tests had been conducted in Belarus to date.

On 18 February, a total of 273,659 confirmed cases were reported, including 263,368 recoveries and 1,885 deaths. More than 4,732,000 COVID-19 tests had been conducted in Belarus to date.

On 19 February, a total of 275,322 confirmed cases were reported, including 264,976 recoveries and 1,894 deaths. More than 4,753,000 COVID-19 tests had been conducted in Belarus to date.

On 20 February, a total of 276,990 confirmed cases were reported, including 266,892 recoveries and 1,903 deaths. More than 4,771,000 COVID-19 tests had been conducted in Belarus to date.

On 21 February, a total of 278,312 confirmed cases were reported, including 268,530 recoveries and 1,912 deaths. More than 4,790,000 COVID-19 tests had been conducted in Belarus to date.

On 22 February, a total of 279,456 confirmed cases were reported, including 269,428 recoveries and 1,921 deaths. More than 4,799,000 COVID-19 tests had been conducted in Belarus to date.

On 23 February, a total of 280,428 confirmed cases were reported, including 270,289 recoveries and 1,930 deaths. More than 4,806,000 COVID-19 tests had been conducted in Belarus to date.

On 24 February, a total of 281,707 confirmed cases were reported, including 271,733 recoveries and 1,939 deaths. More than 4,824,000 COVID-19 tests had been conducted in Belarus to date.

On 25 February, a total of 282,898 confirmed cases were reported, including 273,146 recoveries and 1,948 deaths. More than 4,841,000 COVID-19 tests had been conducted in Belarus to date.

On 26 February, a total of 284,500 confirmed cases were reported, including 274,743 recoveries and 1,957 deaths. More than 4,861,000 COVID-19 tests had been conducted in Belarus to date.

On 27 February, a total of 285,959 confirmed cases were reported, including 276,234 recoveries and 1,966 deaths. More than 4,879,000 COVID-19 tests had been conducted in Belarus to date.

On 28 February, a total of 287,306 confirmed cases were reported, including 277,995 recoveries and 1,976 deaths. More than 4,898,000 COVID-19 tests had been conducted in Belarus to date.

=== March 2021 ===
March 2021
On 1 March, a total of 288,267 confirmed cases were reported, including 278,661 recoveries and 1,985 deaths. More than 4,908,000 COVID-19 tests had been conducted in Belarus to date.

On 2 March, a total of 289,136 confirmed cases were reported, including 279,450 recoveries and 1,993 deaths. More than 4,915,000 COVID-19 tests had been conducted in Belarus to date.

On 3 March, a total of 290,447 confirmed cases were reported, including 280,766 recoveries and 2,002 deaths. More than 4,933,000 COVID-19 tests had been conducted in Belarus to date.

On 4 March, a total of 291,621 confirmed cases were reported, including 282,039 recoveries and 2,011 deaths. More than 4,951,000 COVID-19 tests had been conducted in Belarus to date.

On 5 March, a total of 293,103 confirmed cases were reported, including 283,508 recoveries and 2,020 deaths. More than 4,971,000 COVID-19 tests had been conducted in Belarus to date.

On 6 March, a total of 294,432 confirmed cases were reported, including 285,036 recoveries and 2,029 deaths. More than 4,988,000 COVID-19 tests had been conducted in Belarus to date.

On 7 March, a total of 295,511 confirmed cases were reported, including 286,484 recoveries and 2,038 deaths. More than 5,007,000 COVID-19 tests had been conducted in Belarus to date.

On 8 March, a total of 296,441 confirmed cases were reported, including 287,197 recoveries and 2,047 deaths. More than 5,017,000 COVID-19 tests had been conducted in Belarus to date.

On 9 March, a total of 297,514 confirmed cases were reported, including 288,049 recoveries and 2,055 deaths. More than 5,025,000 COVID-19 tests had been conducted in Belarus to date.

On 10 March, a total of 298,123 confirmed cases were reported, including 288,613 recoveries and 2,063 deaths. More than 5,032,000 COVID-19 tests had been conducted in Belarus to date.

On 11 March, a total of 298,960 confirmed cases were reported, including 289,622 recoveries and 2,070 deaths. More than 5,048,000 COVID-19 tests had been conducted in Belarus to date.

On 12 March, a total of 300,146 confirmed cases were reported, including 290,865 recoveries and 2,078 deaths. More than 5,063,000 COVID-19 tests had been conducted in Belarus to date.

On 13 March, a total of 301,328 confirmed cases were reported, including 292,186 recoveries and 2,087 deaths. More than 5,082,000 COVID-19 tests had been conducted in Belarus to date.

On 14 March, a total of 302,323 confirmed cases were reported, including 293,485 recoveries and 2,095 deaths. More than 5,101,000 COVID-19 tests had been conducted in Belarus to date.

On 15 March, a total of 303,270 confirmed cases were reported, including 294,143 recoveries and 2,103 deaths. More than 5,113,000 COVID-19 tests had been conducted in Belarus to date.

On 16 March, a total of 304,146 confirmed cases were reported, including 294,878 recoveries and 2,112 deaths. More than 5,122,000 COVID-19 tests had been conducted in Belarus to date.

On 17 March, a total of 305,270 confirmed cases were reported, including 296,183 recoveries and 2,121 deaths. More than 5,139,000 COVID-19 tests had been conducted in Belarus to date.

On 18 March, a total of 306,524 confirmed cases were reported, including 297,502 recoveries and 2,130 deaths. More than 5,159,000 COVID-19 tests had been conducted in Belarus to date.

On 19 March, a total of 307,938 confirmed cases were reported, including 298,816 recoveries and 2,139 deaths. More than 5,178,000 COVID-19 tests had been conducted in Belarus to date.

On 20 March, a total of 309,293 confirmed cases were reported, including 300,096 recoveries and 2,148 deaths. More than 5,197,000 COVID-19 tests had been conducted in Belarus to date.

On 21 March, a total of 310,445 confirmed cases were reported, including 301,442 recoveries and 2,157 deaths. More than 5,215,000 COVID-19 tests had been conducted in Belarus to date.

On 22 March, a total of 311,428 confirmed cases were reported, including 302,168 recoveries and 2,166 deaths. More than 5,226,000 COVID-19 tests had been conducted in Belarus to date.

On 23 March, a total of 312,474 confirmed cases were reported, including 303,030 recoveries and 2,175 deaths. More than 5,234,000 COVID-19 tests had been conducted in Belarus to date.

On 24 March, a total of 313,852 confirmed cases were reported, including 304,477 recoveries and 2,184 deaths. More than 5,253,000 COVID-19 tests had been conducted in Belarus to date.

On 25 March, a total of 314,993 confirmed cases were reported, including 305,560 recoveries and 2,193 deaths. More than 5,272,000 COVID-19 tests had been conducted in Belarus to date.

On 26 March, a total of 316,418 confirmed cases were reported, including 307,004 recoveries and 2,202 deaths. More than 5,291,000 COVID-19 tests had been conducted in Belarus to date.

On 27 March, a total of 317,631 confirmed cases were reported, including 308,216 recoveries and 2,211 deaths. More than 5,310,000 COVID-19 tests had been conducted in Belarus to date.

On 28 March, a total of 318,681 confirmed cases were reported, including 309,535 recoveries and 2,219 deaths. More than 5,330,000 COVID-19 tests had been conducted in Belarus to date.

On 29 March, a total of 319,599 confirmed cases were reported, including 310,189 recoveries and 2,227 deaths. More than 5,341,000 COVID-19 tests had been conducted in Belarus to date.

On 30 March, a total of 320,594 confirmed cases were reported, including 310,983 recoveries and 2,237 deaths. More than 5,349,000 COVID-19 tests had been conducted in Belarus to date.

On 31 March, a total of 321,807 confirmed cases were reported, including 312,320 recoveries and 2,247 deaths. More than 5,368,000 COVID-19 tests had been conducted in Belarus to date.

=== April 2021 ===
April 2021
On 1 April, a total of 323,043 confirmed cases were reported, including 313,628 recoveries and 2,257 deaths. More than 5,388,000 COVID-19 tests had been conducted in Belarus to date.

On 2 April, a total of 324,694 confirmed cases were reported, including 315,226 recoveries and 2,267 deaths. More than 5,406,000 COVID-19 tests had been conducted in Belarus to date.

On 3 April, a total of 326,065 confirmed cases were reported, including 316,649 recoveries and 2,276 deaths. More than 5,424,000 COVID-19 tests had been conducted in Belarus to date.

On 4 April, a total of 327,304 confirmed cases were reported, including 318,033 recoveries and 2,285 deaths. More than 5,443,000 COVID-19 tests had been conducted in Belarus to date.

On 5 April, a total of 328,290 confirmed cases were reported, including 318,756 recoveries and 2,294 deaths. More than 5,453,000 COVID-19 tests had been conducted in Belarus to date.

On 6 April, a total of 329,258 confirmed cases were reported, including 319,601 recoveries and 2,304 deaths. More than 5,460,000 COVID-19 tests had been conducted in Belarus to date.

On 7 April, a total of 330,536 confirmed cases were reported, including 320,844 recoveries and 2,314 deaths. More than 5,478,000 COVID-19 tests had been conducted in Belarus to date.

On 8 April, a total of 331,808 confirmed cases were reported, including 322,223 recoveries and 2,324 deaths. More than 5,496,000 COVID-19 tests had been conducted in Belarus to date.

On 9 April, a total of 333,430 confirmed cases were reported, including 323,748 recoveries and 2,334 deaths. More than 5,516,000 COVID-19 tests had been conducted in Belarus to date.

On 10 April, a total of 334,863 confirmed cases were reported, including 325,108 recoveries and 2,344 deaths. More than 5,535,000 COVID-19 tests had been conducted in Belarus to date.

On 11 April, a total of 336,038 confirmed cases were reported, including 326,487 recoveries and 2,354 deaths. More than 5,553,000 COVID-19 tests had been conducted in Belarus to date.

On 12 April, a total of 336,881 confirmed cases were reported, including 327,087 recoveries and 2,363 deaths. More than 5,563,000 COVID-19 tests had been conducted in Belarus to date.

On 13 April, a total of 337,635 confirmed cases were reported, including 327,848 recoveries and 2,373 deaths. More than 5,570,000 COVID-19 tests had been conducted in Belarus to date.

On 14 April, a total of 338,801 confirmed cases were reported, including 329,135 recoveries and 2,383 deaths. More than 5,589,000 COVID-19 tests had been conducted in Belarus to date.

On 15 April, a total of 340,023 confirmed cases were reported, including 330,483 recoveries and 2,393 deaths. More than 5,608,000 COVID-19 tests had been conducted in Belarus to date.

On 16 April, a total of 341,539 confirmed cases were reported, including 331,972 recoveries and 2,403 deaths. More than 5,627,000 COVID-19 tests had been conducted in Belarus to date.

On 17 April, a total of 342,923 confirmed cases were reported, including 333,373 recoveries and 2,413 deaths. More than 5,647,000 COVID-19 tests had been conducted in Belarus to date.

On 18 April, a total of 344,223 confirmed cases were reported, including 334,852 recoveries and 2,423 deaths. More than 5,666,000 COVID-19 tests had been conducted in Belarus to date.

On 19 April, a total of 345,110 confirmed cases were reported, including 335,485 recoveries and 2,433 deaths. More than 5,676,000 COVID-19 tests had been conducted in Belarus to date.

On 20 April, a total of 345,998 confirmed cases were reported, including 336,227 recoveries and 2,443 deaths. More than 5,685,000 COVID-19 tests had been conducted in Belarus to date.

On 21 April, a total of 347,316 confirmed cases were reported, including 337,620 recoveries and 2,453 deaths. More than 5,705,000 COVID-19 tests had been conducted in Belarus to date.

On 22 April, a total of 348,486 confirmed cases were reported, including 338,927 recoveries and 2,463 deaths. More than 5,723,000 COVID-19 tests had been conducted in Belarus to date.

On 23 April, a total of 350,221 confirmed cases were reported, including 340,660 recoveries and 2,473 deaths. More than 5,741,000 COVID-19 tests had been conducted in Belarus to date.

On 24 April, a total of 351,674 confirmed cases were reported, including 342,102 recoveries and 2,483 deaths. More than 5,759,000 COVID-19 tests had been conducted in Belarus to date.

On 25 April, a total of 352,950 confirmed cases were reported, including 343,557 recoveries and 2,493 deaths. More than 5,778,000 COVID-19 tests had been conducted in Belarus to date.

On 26 April, a total of 353,846 confirmed cases were reported, including 344,206 recoveries and 2,502 deaths. More than 5,788,000 COVID-19 tests had been conducted in Belarus to date.

On 27 April, a total of 354,669 confirmed cases were reported, including 344,950 recoveries and 2,512 deaths. More than 5,797,000 COVID-19 tests had been conducted in Belarus to date.

On 28 April, a total of 355,924 confirmed cases were reported, including 346,148 recoveries and 2,522 deaths. More than 5,815,000 COVID-19 tests had been conducted in Belarus to date.

On 29 April, a total of 357,233 confirmed cases were reported, including 347,554 recoveries and 2,532 deaths. More than 5,832,000 COVID-19 tests had been conducted in Belarus to date.

On 30 April, a total of 358,738 confirmed cases were reported, including 349,013 recoveries and 2,542 deaths. More than 5,850,000 COVID-19 tests had been conducted in Belarus to date.

=== May 2021 ===
May 2021
On 1 May, a total of 359,982 confirmed cases were reported, including 350,433 recoveries and 2,552 deaths. More than 5,868,000 COVID-19 tests had been conducted in Belarus to date.

On 2 May, a total of 361,063 confirmed cases were reported, including 351,816 recoveries and 2,562 deaths. More than 5,887,000 COVID-19 tests had been conducted in Belarus to date.

On 3 May, a total of 361,897 confirmed cases were reported, including 352,464 recoveries and 2,572 deaths. More than 5,895,000 COVID-19 tests had been conducted in Belarus to date.

On 4 May, a total of 362,594 confirmed cases were reported, including 353,081 recoveries and 2,582 deaths. More than 5,902,000 COVID-19 tests had been conducted in Belarus to date.

On 5 May, a total of 363,732 confirmed cases were reported, including 354,212 recoveries and 2,592 deaths. More than 5,920,000 COVID-19 tests had been conducted in Belarus to date.

On 6 May, a total of 364,951 confirmed cases were reported, including 355,531 recoveries and 2,602 deaths. More than 5,939,000 COVID-19 tests had been conducted in Belarus to date.

On 7 May, a total of 366,305 confirmed cases were reported, including 356,842 recoveries and 2,612 deaths. More than 5,958,000 COVID-19 tests had been conducted in Belarus to date.

On 8 May, a total of 367,674 confirmed cases were reported, including 358,261 recoveries and 2,622 deaths. More than 5,976,000 COVID-19 tests had been conducted in Belarus to date.

On 9 May, a total of 368,888 confirmed cases were reported, including 359,687 recoveries and 2,632 deaths. More than 5,996,000 COVID-19 tests had been conducted in Belarus to date.

On 10 May, a total of 369,767 confirmed cases were reported, including 360,255 recoveries and 2,642 deaths. More than 6,007,000 COVID-19 tests had been conducted in Belarus to date.

On 11 May, a total of 370,509 confirmed cases were reported, including 360,916 recoveries and 2,652 deaths. More than 6,015,000 COVID-19 tests had been conducted in Belarus to date.

On 12 May, a total of 371,405 confirmed cases were reported, including 362,112 recoveries and 2,661 deaths. More than 6,028,000 COVID-19 tests had been conducted in Belarus to date.

On 13 May, a total of 372,242 confirmed cases were reported, including 362,806 recoveries and 2,671 deaths. More than 6,036,000 COVID-19 tests had been conducted in Belarus to date.

On 14 May, a total of 373,351 confirmed cases were reported, including 363,873 recoveries and 2,681 deaths. More than 6,050,000 COVID-19 tests had been conducted in Belarus to date.

On 15 May, a total of 374,714 confirmed cases were reported, including 365,255 recoveries and 2,691 deaths. More than 6,070,000 COVID-19 tests had been conducted in Belarus to date.

On 16 May, a total of 376,341 confirmed cases were reported, including 367,097 recoveries and 2,701 deaths. More than 6,090,000 COVID-19 tests had been conducted in Belarus to date.

On 17 May, a total of 377,532 confirmed cases were reported, including 367,840 recoveries and 2,711 deaths. More than 6,105,000 COVID-19 tests had been conducted in Belarus to date.

On 18 May, a total of 378,711 confirmed cases were reported, including 368,832 recoveries and 2,721 deaths. More than 6,113,000 COVID-19 tests had been conducted in Belarus to date.

On 19 May, a total of 380,089 confirmed cases were reported, including 370,135 recoveries and 2,732 deaths. More than 6,133,000 COVID-19 tests had been conducted in Belarus to date.

On 20 May, a total of 381,546 confirmed cases were reported, including 371,666 recoveries and 2,742 deaths. More than 6,154,000 COVID-19 tests had been conducted in Belarus to date.

On 21 May, a total of 383,302 confirmed cases were reported, including 373,391 recoveries and 2,752 deaths. More than 6,174,000 COVID-19 tests had been conducted in Belarus to date.

On 22 May, a total of 384,773 confirmed cases were reported, including 374,854 recoveries and 2,761 deaths. More than 6,192,000 COVID-19 tests had been conducted in Belarus to date.

On 23 May, a total of 386,025 confirmed cases were reported, including 376,453 recoveries and 2,771 deaths. More than 6,211,000 COVID-19 tests had been conducted in Belarus to date.

On 24 May, a total of 386,978 confirmed cases were reported, including 377,105 recoveries and 2,780 deaths. More than 6,221,000 COVID-19 tests had been conducted in Belarus to date.

On 25 May, a total of 387,818 confirmed cases were reported, including 377,869 recoveries and 2,791 deaths. More than 6,230,000 COVID-19 tests had been conducted in Belarus to date.

On 26 May, a total of 388,987 confirmed cases were reported, including 379,265 recoveries and 2,801 deaths. More than 6,249,000 COVID-19 tests had been conducted in Belarus to date.

On 27 May, a total of 390,203 confirmed cases were reported, including 380,677 recoveries and 2,811 deaths. More than 6,268,000 COVID-19 tests had been conducted in Belarus to date.

On 28 May, a total of 391,637 confirmed cases were reported, including 382,167 recoveries and 2,821 deaths. More than 6,286,000 COVID-19 tests had been conducted in Belarus to date.

On 29 May, a total of 392,629 confirmed cases were reported, including 383,380 recoveries and 2,831 deaths. More than 6,304,000 COVID-19 tests had been conducted in Belarus to date.

On 30 May, a total of 393,807 confirmed cases were reported, including 384,933 recoveries and 2,841 deaths. More than 6,323,000 COVID-19 tests had been conducted in Belarus to date.

On 31 May, a total of 394,439 confirmed cases were reported, including 385,382 recoveries and 2,851 deaths. More than 6,335,000 COVID-19 tests had been conducted in Belarus to date.

=== June 2021 ===
June 2021
On 1 June, a total of 395,075 confirmed cases were reported, including 386,088 recoveries and 2,861 deaths. More than 6,343,000 COVID-19 tests had been conducted in Belarus to date.

On 2 June, a total of 395,990 confirmed cases were reported, including 387,338 recoveries and 2,871 deaths. More than 6,361,000 COVID-19 tests had been conducted in Belarus to date.

On 3 June, a total of 396,869 confirmed cases were reported, including 388,632 recoveries and 2,882 deaths. More than 6,378,000 COVID-19 tests had been conducted in Belarus to date.

On 4 June, a total of 398,052 confirmed cases were reported, including 389,929 recoveries and 2,892 deaths. More than 6,394,000 COVID-19 tests had been conducted in Belarus to date.

On 5 June, a total of 398,909 confirmed cases were reported, including 391,003 recoveries and 2,900 deaths. More than 6,409,000 COVID-19 tests had been conducted in Belarus to date.

On 6 June, a total of 399,852 confirmed cases were reported, including 392,366 recoveries and 2,910 deaths. More than 6,427,000 COVID-19 tests had been conducted in Belarus to date.

On 7 June, a total of 400,422 confirmed cases were reported, including 392,744 recoveries and 2,919 deaths. More than 6,438,000 COVID-19 tests had been conducted in Belarus to date.

On 8 June, a total of 401,019 confirmed cases were reported, including 393,237 recoveries and 2,929 deaths. More than 6,447,000 COVID-19 tests had been conducted in Belarus to date.

On 9 June, a total of 401,853 confirmed cases were reported, including 394,272 recoveries and 2,939 deaths. More than 6,466,000 COVID-19 tests had been conducted in Belarus to date.

On 10 June, a total of 402,819 confirmed cases were reported, including 395,463 recoveries and 2,949 deaths. More than 6,483,000 COVID-19 tests had been conducted in Belarus to date.

On 11 June, a total of 403,845 confirmed cases were reported, including 396,650 recoveries and 2,958 deaths. More than 6,500,000 COVID-19 tests had been conducted in Belarus to date.

On 12 June, a total of 404,740 confirmed cases were reported, including 397,587 recoveries and 2,969 deaths. More than 6,516,000 COVID-19 tests had been conducted in Belarus to date.

On 13 June, a total of 405,663 confirmed cases were reported, including 398,742 recoveries and 2,978 deaths. More than 6,533,000 COVID-19 tests had been conducted in Belarus to date.

On 14 June, a total of 406,360 confirmed cases were reported, including 399,174 recoveries and 2,987 deaths. More than 6,544,000 COVID-19 tests had been conducted in Belarus to date.

On 15 June, a total of 406,861 confirmed cases were reported, including 399,549 recoveries and 2,995 deaths. More than 6,555,000 COVID-19 tests had been conducted in Belarus to date.

On 16 June, a total of 407,748 confirmed cases were reported, including 400,513 recoveries and 3,006 deaths. More than 6,572,000 COVID-19 tests had been conducted in Belarus to date.

On 17 June, a total of 408,621 confirmed cases were reported, including 401,462 recoveries and 3,015 deaths. More than 6,593,000 COVID-19 tests had been conducted in Belarus to date.

On 18 June, a total of 409,385 confirmed cases were reported, including 402,202 recoveries and 3,025 deaths. More than 6,610,000 COVID-19 tests had been conducted in Belarus to date.

On 19 June, a total of 410,096 confirmed cases were reported, including 402,876 recoveries and 3,035 deaths. More than 6,627,000 COVID-19 tests had been conducted in Belarus to date.

On 20 June, a total of 410,678 confirmed cases were reported, including 403,758 recoveries and 3,044 deaths. More than 6,645,000 COVID-19 tests had been conducted in Belarus to date.

On 21 June, a total of 411,153 confirmed cases were reported, including 404,025 recoveries and 3,053 deaths. More than 6,655,000 COVID-19 tests had been conducted in Belarus to date.

On 22 June, a total of 411,551 confirmed cases were reported, including 404,240 recoveries and 3,063 deaths. More than 6,667,000 COVID-19 tests had been conducted in Belarus to date.

On 23 June, a total of 412,353 confirmed cases were reported, including 405,045 recoveries and 3,072 deaths. More than 6,686,000 COVID-19 tests had been conducted in Belarus to date.

On 24 June, a total of 413,139 confirmed cases were reported, including 405,909 recoveries and 3,082 deaths. More than 6,704,000 COVID-19 tests had been conducted in Belarus to date.

On 25 June, a total of 413,952 confirmed cases were reported, including 406,686 recoveries and 3,093 deaths. More than 6,720,000 COVID-19 tests had been conducted in Belarus to date.

On 26 June, a total of 414,730 confirmed cases were reported, including 407,528 recoveries and 3,103 deaths. More than 6,736,000 COVID-19 tests had been conducted in Belarus to date.

On 27 June, a total of 415,339 confirmed cases were reported, including 408,307 recoveries and 3,113 deaths. More than 6,754,000 COVID-19 tests had been conducted in Belarus to date.

On 28 June, a total of 415,780 confirmed cases were reported, including 408,503 recoveries and 3,122 deaths. More than 6,764,000 COVID-19 tests had been conducted in Belarus to date.

On 29 June, a total of 416,275 confirmed cases were reported, including 408,878 recoveries and 3,132 deaths. More than 6,776,000 COVID-19 tests had been conducted in Belarus to date.

On 30 June, a total of 417,189 confirmed cases were reported, including 409,797 recoveries and 3,143 deaths. More than 6,795,000 COVID-19 tests had been conducted in Belarus to date.

=== July 2021 ===
July 2021
On 1 July, a total of 418,212 confirmed cases were reported, including 410,984 recoveries and 3,153 deaths. More than 6,813,000 COVID-19 tests had been conducted in Belarus to date.

On 2 July, a total of 419,330 confirmed cases were reported, including 412,128 recoveries and 3,164 deaths. More than 6,831,000 COVID-19 tests had been conducted in Belarus to date.

On 3 July, a total of 420,406 confirmed cases were reported, including 413,292 recoveries and 3,175 deaths. More than 6,848,000 COVID-19 tests had been conducted in Belarus to date.

On 4 July, a total of 421,350 confirmed cases were reported, including 414,460 recoveries and 3,185 deaths. More than 6,866,000 COVID-19 tests had been conducted in Belarus to date.

On 5 July, a total of 421,964 confirmed cases were reported, including 414,948 recoveries and 3,194 deaths. More than 6,875,000 COVID-19 tests had been conducted in Belarus to date.

On 6 July, a total of 422,521 confirmed cases were reported, including 415,363 recoveries and 3,204 deaths. More than 6,886,000 COVID-19 tests had been conducted in Belarus to date.

On 7 July, a total of 423,519 confirmed cases were reported, including 416,412 recoveries and 3,214 deaths. More than 6,905,000 COVID-19 tests had been conducted in Belarus to date.

On 8 July, a total of 424,554 confirmed cases were reported, including 417,585 recoveries and 3,225 deaths. More than 6,923,000 COVID-19 tests had been conducted in Belarus to date.

On 9 July, a total of 425,804 confirmed cases were reported, including 418,920 recoveries and 3,236 deaths. More than 6,941,000 COVID-19 tests had been conducted in Belarus to date.

On 10 July, a total of 426,886 confirmed cases were reported, including 420,085 recoveries and 3,247 deaths. More than 6,958,000 COVID-19 tests had been conducted in Belarus to date.

On 11 July, a total of 427,906 confirmed cases were reported, including 421,305 recoveries and 3,257 deaths. More than 6,977,000 COVID-19 tests had been conducted in Belarus to date.

On 12 July, a total of 428,595 confirmed cases were reported, including 421,842 recoveries and 3,266 deaths. More than 6,987,000 COVID-19 tests had been conducted in Belarus to date.

On 13 July, a total of 429,181 confirmed cases were reported, including 422,374 recoveries and 3,276 deaths. More than 6,999,000 COVID-19 tests had been conducted in Belarus to date.

On 14 July, a total of 430,121 confirmed cases were reported, including 423,404 recoveries and 3,287 deaths. More than 7,018,000 COVID-19 tests had been conducted in Belarus to date.

On 15 July, a total of 431,112 confirmed cases were reported, including 424,546 recoveries and 3,297 deaths. More than 7,038,000 COVID-19 tests had been conducted in Belarus to date.

On 16 July, a total of 432,388 confirmed cases were reported, including 425,907 recoveries and 3,306 deaths. More than 7,054,000 COVID-19 tests had been conducted in Belarus to date.

On 17 July, a total of 433,409 confirmed cases were reported, including 427,025 recoveries and 3,316 deaths. More than 7,072,000 COVID-19 tests had been conducted in Belarus to date.

On 18 July, a total of 434,362 confirmed cases were reported, including 428,202 recoveries and 3,326 deaths. More than 7,090,000 COVID-19 tests had been conducted in Belarus to date.

On 19 July, a total of 435,020 confirmed cases were reported, including 428,682 recoveries and 3,334 deaths. More than 7,101,000 COVID-19 tests had been conducted in Belarus to date.

On 20 July, a total of 435,620 confirmed cases were reported, including 429,257 recoveries and 3,344 deaths. More than 7,114,000 COVID-19 tests had been conducted in Belarus to date.

On 21 July, a total of 436,595 confirmed cases were reported, including 430,287 recoveries and 3,355 deaths. More than 7,134,000 COVID-19 tests had been conducted in Belarus to date.

On 22 July, a total of 437,664 confirmed cases were reported, including 431,489 recoveries and 3,365 deaths. More than 7,151,000 COVID-19 tests had been conducted in Belarus to date.

On 23 July, a total of 438,767 confirmed cases were reported, including 432,655 recoveries and 3,376 deaths. More than 7,168,000 COVID-19 tests had been conducted in Belarus to date.

On 24 July, a total of 439,828 confirmed cases were reported, including 433,782 recoveries and 3,385 deaths. More than 7,185,000 COVID-19 tests had been conducted in Belarus to date.

On 25 July, a total of 440,708 confirmed cases were reported, including 434,882 recoveries and 3,394 deaths. More than 7,203,000 COVID-19 tests had been conducted in Belarus to date.

On 26 July, a total of 441,356 confirmed cases were reported, including 435,374 recoveries and 3,403 deaths. More than 7,214,000 COVID-19 tests had been conducted in Belarus to date.

On 27 July, a total of 441,881 confirmed cases were reported, including 435,842 recoveries and 3,413 deaths. More than 7,220,000 COVID-19 tests had been conducted in Belarus to date.

On 28 July, a total of 442,831 confirmed cases were reported, including 436,903 recoveries and 3,424 deaths. More than 7,241,000 COVID-19 tests had been conducted in Belarus to date.

On 29 July, a total of 443,864 confirmed cases were reported, including 438,050 recoveries and 3,435 deaths. More than 7,259,000 COVID-19 tests had been conducted in Belarus to date.

On 30 July, a total of 445,048 confirmed cases were reported, including 439,162 recoveries and 3,445 deaths. More than 7,276,000 COVID-19 tests had been conducted in Belarus to date.

On 31 July, a total of 446,040 confirmed cases were reported, including 440,200 recoveries and 3,454 deaths. More than 7,294,000 COVID-19 tests had been conducted in Belarus to date.

=== August 2021 ===
August 2021
On 1 August, a total of 446,998 confirmed cases were reported, including 441,369 recoveries and 3,464 deaths. More than 7,312,000 COVID-19 tests had been conducted in Belarus to date.

On 2 August, a total of 447,754 confirmed cases were reported, including 441,961 recoveries and 3,472 deaths. More than 7,324,000 COVID-19 tests had been conducted in Belarus to date.

On 3 August, a total of 448,335 confirmed cases were reported, including 442,380 recoveries and 3,483 deaths. More than 7,330,000 COVID-19 tests had been conducted in Belarus to date.

On 4 August, a total of 449,302 confirmed cases were reported, including 443,417 recoveries and 3,494 deaths. More than 7,352,000 COVID-19 tests had been conducted in Belarus to date.

On 5 August, a total of 450,445 confirmed cases were reported, including 444,613 recoveries and 3,503 deaths. More than 7,370,000 COVID-19 tests had been conducted in Belarus to date.

On 6 August, a total of 451,740 confirmed cases were reported, including 445,890 recoveries and 3,513 deaths. More than 7,388,000 COVID-19 tests had been conducted in Belarus to date.

On 7 August, a total of 452,953 confirmed cases were reported, including 447,059 recoveries and 3,523 deaths. More than 7,406,000 COVID-19 tests had been conducted in Belarus to date.

On 8 August, a total of 453,932 confirmed cases were reported, including 448,220 recoveries and 3,532 deaths. More than 7,426,000 COVID-19 tests had been conducted in Belarus to date.

On 9 August, a total of 454,674 confirmed cases were reported, including 448,752 recoveries and 3,541 deaths. More than 7,438,000 COVID-19 tests had been conducted in Belarus to date.

On 10 August, a total of 455,281 confirmed cases were reported, including 449,186 recoveries and 3,551 deaths. More than 7,443,000 COVID-19 tests had been conducted in Belarus to date.

On 11 August, a total of 456,247 confirmed cases were reported, including 450,248 recoveries and 3,562 deaths. More than 7,463,000 COVID-19 tests had been conducted in Belarus to date.

On 12 August, a total of 457,422 confirmed cases were reported, including 451,598 recoveries and 3,572 deaths. More than 7,483,000 COVID-19 tests had been conducted in Belarus to date.

On 13 August, a total of 458,847 confirmed cases were reported, including 453,024 recoveries and 3,582 deaths. More than 7,503,000 COVID-19 tests had been conducted in Belarus to date.

On 14 August, a total of 459,998 confirmed cases were reported, including 454,103 recoveries and 3,593 deaths. More than 7,521,000 COVID-19 tests had been conducted in Belarus to date.

On 15 August, a total of 461,303 confirmed cases were reported, including 455,521 recoveries and 3,604 deaths. More than 7,542,000 COVID-19 tests had been conducted in Belarus to date.

On 16 August, a total of 462,197 confirmed cases were reported, including 456,193 recoveries and 3,613 deaths. More than 7,554,000 COVID-19 tests had been conducted in Belarus to date.

On 17 August, a total of 462,794 confirmed cases were reported, including 456,666 recoveries and 3,625 deaths. More than 7,560,000 COVID-19 tests had been conducted in Belarus to date.

On 18 August, a total of 463,855 confirmed cases were reported, including 457,682 recoveries and 3,637 deaths. More than 7,582,000 COVID-19 tests had been conducted in Belarus to date.

On 19 August, a total of 465,210 confirmed cases were reported, including 459,090 recoveries and 3,649 deaths. More than 7,603,000 COVID-19 tests had been conducted in Belarus to date.

On 20 August, a total of 466,948 confirmed cases were reported, including 460,813 recoveries and 3,659 deaths. More than 7,623,000 COVID-19 tests had been conducted in Belarus to date.

On 21 August, a total of 468,415 confirmed cases were reported, including 462,244 recoveries and 3,670 deaths. More than 7,641,000 COVID-19 tests had been conducted in Belarus to date.

On 22 August, a total of 469,717 confirmed cases were reported, including 463,599 recoveries and 3,681 deaths. More than 7,660,000 COVID-19 tests had been conducted in Belarus to date.

On 23 August, a total of 470,635 confirmed cases were reported, including 464,300 recoveries and 3,691 deaths. More than 7,674,000 COVID-19 tests had been conducted in Belarus to date.

On 24 August, a total of 471,495 confirmed cases were reported, including 465,027 recoveries and 3,701 deaths. More than 7,679,000 COVID-19 tests had been conducted in Belarus to date.

On 25 August, a total of 472,852 confirmed cases were reported, including 466,332 recoveries and 3,712 deaths. More than 7,700,000 COVID-19 tests had been conducted in Belarus to date.

On 26 August, a total of 474,403 confirmed cases were reported, including 467,836 recoveries and 3,723 deaths. More than 7,720,000 COVID-19 tests had been conducted in Belarus to date.

On 27 August, a total of 476,265 confirmed cases were reported, including 469,569 recoveries and 3,735 deaths. More than 7,739,000 COVID-19 tests had been conducted in Belarus to date.

On 28 August, a total of 477,901 confirmed cases were reported, including 471,018 recoveries and 3,745 deaths. More than 7,757,000 COVID-19 tests had been conducted in Belarus to date.

On 29 August, a total of 479,306 confirmed cases were reported, including 472,505 recoveries and 3,757 deaths. More than 7,777,000 COVID-19 tests had been conducted in Belarus to date.

On 30 August, a total of 480,364 confirmed cases were reported, including 473,274 recoveries and 3,768 deaths. More than 7,790,000 COVID-19 tests had been conducted in Belarus to date.

On 31 August, a total of 481,532 confirmed cases were reported, including 474,300 recoveries and 3,780 deaths. More than 7,797,000 COVID-19 tests had been conducted in Belarus to date.

=== September 2021 ===
September 2021
On 1 September, a total of 483,231 confirmed cases were reported, including 475,898 recoveries and 3,791 deaths. More than 7,817,000 COVID-19 tests had been conducted in Belarus to date.

On 2 September, a total of 485,067 confirmed cases were reported, including 477,682 recoveries and 3,803 deaths. More than 7,839,000 COVID-19 tests had been conducted in Belarus to date.

On 3 September, a total of 487,017 confirmed cases were reported, including 479,229 recoveries and 3,814 deaths. More than 7,859,000 COVID-19 tests had been conducted in Belarus to date.

On 4 September, a total of 488,963 confirmed cases were reported, including 480,994 recoveries and 3,826 deaths. More than 7,879,000 COVID-19 tests had been conducted in Belarus to date.

On 5 September, a total of 490,926 confirmed cases were reported, including 482,993 recoveries and 3,837 deaths. More than 7,899,000 COVID-19 tests had been conducted in Belarus to date.

On 6 September, a total of 492,399 confirmed cases were reported, including 484,112 recoveries and 3,847 deaths. More than 7,913,000 COVID-19 tests had been conducted in Belarus to date.

On 7 September, a total of 493,818 confirmed cases were reported, including 485,248 recoveries and 3,859 deaths. More than 7,921,000 COVID-19 tests had been conducted in Belarus to date.

On 8 September, a total of 495,578 confirmed cases were reported, including 486,734 recoveries and 3,871 deaths. More than 7,943,000 COVID-19 tests had been conducted in Belarus to date.

On 9 September, a total of 497,420 confirmed cases were reported, including 488,341 recoveries and 3,882 deaths. More than 7,965,000 COVID-19 tests had been conducted in Belarus to date.

On 10 September, a total of 499,279 confirmed cases were reported, including 489,870 recoveries and 3,893 deaths. More than 7,988,000 COVID-19 tests had been conducted in Belarus to date.

On 11 September, a total of 501,166 confirmed cases were reported, including 491,410 recoveries and 3,905 deaths. More than 8,013,000 COVID-19 tests had been conducted in Belarus to date.

On 12 September, a total of 503,073 confirmed cases were reported, including 493,053 recoveries and 3,917 deaths. More than 8,038,000 COVID-19 tests had been conducted in Belarus to date.

On 13 September, a total of 504,961 confirmed cases were reported, including 494,446 recoveries and 3,929 deaths. More than 8,056,000 COVID-19 tests had been conducted in Belarus to date.

On 14 September, a total of 506,591 confirmed cases were reported, including 495,561 recoveries and 3,941 deaths. More than 8,066,000 COVID-19 tests had been conducted in Belarus to date.

On 15 September, a total of 508,514 confirmed cases were reported, including 497,066 recoveries and 3,953 deaths. More than 8,091,000 COVID-19 tests had been conducted in Belarus to date.

On 16 September, a total of 510,481 confirmed cases were reported, including 498,655 recoveries and 3,966 deaths. More than 8,118,000 COVID-19 tests had been conducted in Belarus to date.

On 17 September, a total of 512,460 confirmed cases were reported, including 500,051 recoveries and 3,978 deaths. More than 8,149,000 COVID-19 tests had been conducted in Belarus to date.

On 18 September, a total of 514,446 confirmed cases were reported, including 501,659 recoveries and 3,991 deaths. More than 8,179,000 COVID-19 tests had been conducted in Belarus to date.

On 19 September, a total of 516,428 confirmed cases were reported, including 503,266 recoveries and 4,004 deaths. More than 8,210,000 COVID-19 tests had been conducted in Belarus to date.

On 20 September, a total of 518,369 confirmed cases were reported, including 504,561 recoveries and 4,016 deaths. More than 8,229,000 COVID-19 tests had been conducted in Belarus to date.

On 21 September, a total of 520,286 confirmed cases were reported, including 505,923 recoveries and 4,028 deaths. More than 8,238,000 COVID-19 tests had been conducted in Belarus to date.

On 22 September, a total of 522,275 confirmed cases were reported, including 507,413 recoveries and 4,041 deaths. More than 8,269,000 COVID-19 tests had been conducted in Belarus to date.

On 23 September, a total of 524,248 confirmed cases were reported, including 508,936 recoveries and 4,054 deaths. More than 8,300,000 COVID-19 tests had been conducted in Belarus to date.

On 24 September, a total of 526,242 confirmed cases were reported, including 510,304 recoveries and 4,066 deaths. More than 8,332,000 COVID-19 tests had been conducted in Belarus to date.

On 25 September, a total of 528,229 confirmed cases were reported, including 511,666 recoveries and 4,081 deaths. More than 8,362,000 COVID-19 tests had been conducted in Belarus to date.

On 26 September, a total of 530,203 confirmed cases were reported, including 513,295 recoveries and 4,092 deaths. More than 8,395,000 COVID-19 tests had been conducted in Belarus to date.

On 27 September, a total of 532,149 confirmed cases were reported, including 514,561 recoveries and 4,102 deaths. More than 8,414,000 COVID-19 tests had been conducted in Belarus to date.

On 28 September, a total of 534,104 confirmed cases were reported, including 516,030 recoveries and 4,114 deaths. More than 8,425,000 COVID-19 tests had been conducted in Belarus to date.

On 29 September, a total of 536,097 confirmed cases were reported, including 517,325 recoveries and 4,129 deaths. More than 8,462,000 COVID-19 tests had been conducted in Belarus to date.

On 30 September, a total of 538,086 confirmed cases were reported, including 518,715 recoveries and 4,143 deaths. More than 8,499,000 COVID-19 tests had been conducted in Belarus to date.

=== October 2021 ===
October 2021
On 1 October, a total of 540,079 confirmed cases were reported, including 520,024 recoveries and 4,159 deaths. More than 8,538,000 COVID-19 tests had been conducted in Belarus to date.

On 2 October, a total of 542,077 confirmed cases were reported, including 521,362 recoveries and 4,174 deaths. More than 8,574,000 COVID-19 tests had been conducted in Belarus to date.

On 3 October, a total of 543,976 confirmed cases were reported, including 522,886 recoveries and 4,188 deaths. More than 8,613,000 COVID-19 tests had been conducted in Belarus to date.

On 4 October, a total of 545,848 confirmed cases were reported, including 523,837 recoveries and 4,200 deaths. More than 8,637,000 COVID-19 tests had been conducted in Belarus to date.

On 5 October, a total of 547,826 confirmed cases were reported, including 525,144 recoveries and 4,212 deaths. More than 8,650,000 COVID-19 tests had been conducted in Belarus to date.

On 6 October, a total of 549,817 confirmed cases were reported, including 526,648 recoveries and 4,228 deaths. More than 8,694,000 COVID-19 tests had been conducted in Belarus to date.

On 7 October, a total of 551,800 confirmed cases were reported, including 528,208 recoveries and 4,243 deaths. More than 8,734,000 COVID-19 tests had been conducted in Belarus to date.

On 8 October, a total of 553,795 confirmed cases were reported, including 529,853 recoveries and 4,259 deaths. More than 8,775,000 COVID-19 tests had been conducted in Belarus to date.

On 9 October, a total of 555,793 confirmed cases were reported, including 531,186 recoveries and 4,275 deaths. More than 8,817,000 COVID-19 tests had been conducted in Belarus to date.

On 10 October, a total of 557,772 confirmed cases were reported, including 533,121 recoveries and 4,289 deaths. More than 8,860,000 COVID-19 tests had been conducted in Belarus to date.

On 11 October, a total of 559,715 confirmed cases were reported, including 534,256 recoveries and 4,304 deaths. More than 8,889,000 COVID-19 tests had been conducted in Belarus to date.

On 12 October, a total of 561,753 confirmed cases were reported, including 535,790 recoveries and 4,319 deaths. More than 8,903,000 COVID-19 tests had been conducted in Belarus to date.

On 13 October, a total of 563,813 confirmed cases were reported, including 537,527 recoveries and 4,336 deaths. More than 8,947,000 COVID-19 tests had been conducted in Belarus to date.

On 14 October, a total of 565,865 confirmed cases were reported, including 539,252 recoveries and 4,353 deaths. More than 8,989,000 COVID-19 tests had been conducted in Belarus to date.

On 15 October, a total of 567,938 confirmed cases were reported, including 541,155 recoveries and 4,369 deaths. More than 9,034,000 COVID-19 tests had been conducted in Belarus to date.

On 16 October, a total of 570,006 confirmed cases were reported, including 543,072 recoveries and 4,386 deaths. More than 9,076,000 COVID-19 tests had been conducted in Belarus to date.

On 17 October, a total of 571,987 confirmed cases were reported, including 545,245 recoveries and 4,402 deaths. More than 9,116,000 COVID-19 tests had been conducted in Belarus to date.

On 18 October, a total of 573,943 confirmed cases were reported, including 546,415 recoveries and 4,417 deaths. More than 9,143,000 COVID-19 tests had been conducted in Belarus to date.

On 19 October, a total of 575,856 confirmed cases were reported, including 547,949 recoveries and 4,432 deaths. More than 9,157,000 COVID-19 tests had been conducted in Belarus to date.

On 20 October, a total of 577,932 confirmed cases were reported, including 550,100 recoveries and 4,449 deaths. More than 9,213,000 COVID-19 tests had been conducted in Belarus to date.

On 21 October, a total of 580,029 confirmed cases were reported, including 552,415 recoveries and 4,466 deaths. More than 9,252,000 COVID-19 tests had been conducted in Belarus to date.

On 22 October, a total of 582,111 confirmed cases were reported, including 554,449 recoveries and 4,482 deaths. More than 9,294,000 COVID-19 tests had been conducted in Belarus to date.

On 23 October, a total of 584,190 confirmed cases were reported, including 556,496 recoveries and 4,499 deaths. More than 9,335,000 COVID-19 tests had been conducted in Belarus to date.

On 24 October, a total of 586,234 confirmed cases were reported, including 558,850 recoveries and 4,515 deaths. More than 9,377,000 COVID-19 tests had been conducted in Belarus to date.

On 25 October, a total of 588,231 confirmed cases were reported, including 560,343 recoveries and 4,530 deaths. More than 9,403,000 COVID-19 tests had been conducted in Belarus to date.

On 26 October, a total of 590,226 confirmed cases were reported, including 562,091 recoveries and 4,546 deaths. More than 9,415,000 COVID-19 tests had been conducted in Belarus to date.

On 27 October, a total of 592,224 confirmed cases were reported, including 564,660 recoveries and 4,563 deaths. More than 9,475,000 COVID-19 tests had been conducted in Belarus to date.

On 28 October, a total of 594,203 confirmed cases were reported, including 567,058 recoveries and 4,580 deaths. More than 9,515,000 COVID-19 tests had been conducted in Belarus to date.

On 29 October, a total of 596,191 confirmed cases were reported, including 569,188 recoveries and 4,596 deaths. More than 9,556,000 COVID-19 tests had been conducted in Belarus to date.

On 30 October, a total of 598,183 confirmed cases were reported, including 571,346 recoveries and 4,614 deaths. More than 9,593,000 COVID-19 tests had been conducted in Belarus to date.

On 31 October, a total of 600,168 confirmed cases were reported, including 573,994 recoveries and 4,631 deaths. More than 9,631,000 COVID-19 tests had been conducted in Belarus to date.

=== November 2021 ===
November 2021
On 1 November, a total of 602,058 confirmed cases were reported, including 575,555 recoveries and 4,646 deaths. More than 9,652,000 COVID-19 tests had been conducted in Belarus to date.

On 2 November, a total of 604,037 confirmed cases were reported, including 577,482 recoveries and 4,662 deaths. More than 9,661,000 COVID-19 tests had been conducted in Belarus to date.

On 3 November, a total of 606,033 confirmed cases were reported, including 580,025 recoveries and 4,679 deaths. More than 9,712,000 COVID-19 tests had been conducted in Belarus to date.

On 4 November, a total of 608,031 confirmed cases were reported, including 582,469 recoveries and 4,696 deaths. More than 9,746,000 COVID-19 tests had been conducted in Belarus to date.

On 5 November, a total of 610,022 confirmed cases were reported, including 584,714 recoveries and 4,712 deaths. More than 9,781,000 COVID-19 tests had been conducted in Belarus to date.

On 6 November, a total of 612,015 confirmed cases were reported, including 587,208 recoveries and 4,730 deaths. More than 9,814,000 COVID-19 tests had been conducted in Belarus to date.

On 7 November, a total of 613,927 confirmed cases were reported, including 590,252 recoveries and 4,745 deaths. More than 9,847,000 COVID-19 tests had been conducted in Belarus to date.

On 8 November, a total of 615,814 confirmed cases were reported, including 591,786 recoveries and 4,758 deaths. More than 9,867,000 COVID-19 tests had been conducted in Belarus to date.

On 9 November, a total of 617,719 confirmed cases were reported, including 593,702 recoveries and 4,773 deaths. More than 9,874,000 COVID-19 tests had been conducted in Belarus to date.

On 10 November, a total of 619,708 confirmed cases were reported, including 596,590 recoveries and 4,789 deaths. More than 9,921,000 COVID-19 tests had been conducted in Belarus to date.

On 11 November, a total of 621,689 confirmed cases were reported, including 599,493 recoveries and 4,805 deaths. More than 9,952,000 COVID-19 tests had been conducted in Belarus to date.

On 12 November, a total of 623,682 confirmed cases were reported, including 602,070 recoveries and 4,820 deaths. More than 9,984,000 COVID-19 tests had been conducted in Belarus to date.

On 13 November, a total of 625,592 confirmed cases were reported, including 604,708 recoveries and 4,834 deaths. More than 10,011,000 COVID-19 tests had been conducted in Belarus to date.

On 14 November, a total of 627,478 confirmed cases were reported, including 607,623 recoveries and 4,848 deaths. More than 10,039,000 COVID-19 tests had been conducted in Belarus to date.

On 15 November, a total of 629,271 confirmed cases were reported, including 609,243 recoveries and 4,861 deaths. More than 10,054,000 COVID-19 tests had been conducted in Belarus to date.

On 16 November, a total of 631,025 confirmed cases were reported, including 611,204 recoveries and 4,875 deaths. More than 10,062,000 COVID-19 tests had been conducted in Belarus to date.

On 17 November, a total of 632,887 confirmed cases were reported, including 614,098 recoveries and 4,888 deaths. More than 10,107,000 COVID-19 tests had been conducted in Belarus to date.

On 18 November, a total of 634,731 confirmed cases were reported, including 616,992 recoveries and 4,901 deaths. More than 10,133,000 COVID-19 tests had been conducted in Belarus to date.

On 19 November, a total of 636,543 confirmed cases were reported, including 619,485 recoveries and 4,916 deaths. More than 10,160,000 COVID-19 tests had been conducted in Belarus to date.

On 20 November, a total of 638,402 confirmed cases were reported, including 622,075 recoveries and 4,932 deaths. More than 10,184,000 COVID-19 tests had been conducted in Belarus to date.

On 21 November, a total of 640,206 confirmed cases were reported, including 624,878 recoveries and 4,948 deaths. More than 10,209,000 COVID-19 tests had been conducted in Belarus to date.

On 22 November, a total of 641,919 confirmed cases were reported, including 626,328 recoveries and 4,965 deaths. More than 10,223,000 COVID-19 tests had been conducted in Belarus to date.

On 23 November, a total of 643,372 confirmed cases were reported, including 627,789 recoveries and 4,979 deaths. More than 10,228,000 COVID-19 tests had been conducted in Belarus to date.

On 24 November, a total of 645,069 confirmed cases were reported, including 630,218 recoveries and 4,995 deaths. More than 10,269,000 COVID-19 tests had been conducted in Belarus to date.

On 25 November, a total of 646,743 confirmed cases were reported, including 632,470 recoveries and 5,010 deaths. More than 10,295,000 COVID-19 tests had been conducted in Belarus to date.

On 26 November, a total of 648,472 confirmed cases were reported, including 634,653 recoveries and 5,026 deaths. More than 10,320,000 COVID-19 tests had been conducted in Belarus to date.

On 27 November, a total of 650,168 confirmed cases were reported, including 636,653 recoveries and 5,041 deaths. More than 10,342,000 COVID-19 tests had been conducted in Belarus to date.

On 28 November, a total of 651,839 confirmed cases were reported, including 638,844 recoveries and 5,054 deaths. More than 10,366,000 COVID-19 tests had been conducted in Belarus to date.

On 29 November, a total of 653,323 confirmed cases were reported, including 640,132 recoveries and 5,067 deaths. More than 10,381,000 COVID-19 tests had been conducted in Belarus to date.

On 30 November, a total of 654,718 confirmed cases were reported, including 641,570 recoveries and 5,081 deaths. More than 10,386,000 COVID-19 tests had been conducted in Belarus to date.

=== December 2021 ===
December 2021
On 1 December, a total of 656,510 confirmed cases were reported, including 643,786 recoveries and 5,098 deaths. More than 10,425,000 COVID-19 tests had been conducted in Belarus to date.

On 2 December, a total of 658,328 confirmed cases were reported, including 646,104 recoveries and 5,114 deaths. More than 10,452,000 COVID-19 tests had been conducted in Belarus to date.

On 3 December, a total of 660,204 confirmed cases were reported, including 648,305 recoveries and 5,130 deaths. More than 10,478,000 COVID-19 tests had been conducted in Belarus to date.

On 4 December, a total of 662,056 confirmed cases were reported, including 650,577 recoveries and 5,147 deaths. More than 10,501,000 COVID-19 tests had been conducted in Belarus to date.

On 5 December, a total of 663,813 confirmed cases were reported, including 652,874 recoveries and 5,162 deaths. More than 10,525,000 COVID-19 tests had been conducted in Belarus to date.

On 6 December, a total of 665,125 confirmed cases were reported, including 654,000 recoveries and 5,176 deaths. More than 10,539,000 COVID-19 tests had been conducted in Belarus to date.

On 7 December, a total of 666,137 confirmed cases were reported, including 655,001 recoveries and 5,193 deaths. More than 10,545,000 COVID-19 tests had been conducted in Belarus to date.

On 8 December, a total of 667,893 confirmed cases were reported, including 657,109 recoveries and 5,210 deaths. More than 10,574,000 COVID-19 tests had been conducted in Belarus to date.

On 9 December, a total of 669,631 confirmed cases were reported, including 659,224 recoveries and 5,227 deaths. More than 10,600,000 COVID-19 tests had been conducted in Belarus to date.

On 10 December, a total of 671,432 confirmed cases were reported, including 661,296 recoveries and 5,245 deaths. More than 10,626,000 COVID-19 tests had been conducted in Belarus to date.

On 11 December, a total of 673,269 confirmed cases were reported, including 663,455 recoveries and 5,261 deaths. More than 10,648,000 COVID-19 tests had been conducted in Belarus to date.

On 12 December, a total of 674,723 confirmed cases were reported, including 665,432 recoveries and 5,276 deaths. More than 10,671,000 COVID-19 tests had been conducted in Belarus to date.

On 13 December, a total of 675,734 confirmed cases were reported, including 666,249 recoveries and 5,289 deaths. More than 10,685,000 COVID-19 tests had been conducted in Belarus to date.

On 14 December, a total of 676,512 confirmed cases were reported, including 667,041 recoveries and 5,305 deaths. More than 10,691,000 COVID-19 tests had been conducted in Belarus to date.

On 15 December, a total of 678,277 confirmed cases were reported, including 669,068 recoveries and 5,322 deaths. More than 10,717,000 COVID-19 tests had been conducted in Belarus to date.

On 16 December, a total of 679,873 confirmed cases were reported, including 671,001 recoveries and 5,338 deaths. More than 10,742,000 COVID-19 tests had been conducted in Belarus to date.

On 17 December, a total of 681,517 confirmed cases were reported, including 672,829 recoveries and 5,355 deaths. More than 10,770,000 COVID-19 tests had been conducted in Belarus to date.

On 18 December, a total of 683,172 confirmed cases were reported, including 674,634 recoveries and 5,371 deaths. More than 10,795,000 COVID-19 tests had been conducted in Belarus to date.

On 19 December, a total of 684,628 confirmed cases were reported, including 676,388 recoveries and 5,385 deaths. More than 10,821,000 COVID-19 tests had been conducted in Belarus to date.

On 20 December, a total of 685,462 confirmed cases were reported, including 677,045 recoveries and 5,399 deaths. More than 10,836,000 COVID-19 tests had been conducted in Belarus to date.

On 21 December, a total of 686,294 confirmed cases were reported, including 677,814 recoveries and 5,415 deaths. More than 10,842,000 COVID-19 tests had been conducted in Belarus to date.

On 22 December, a total of 687,948 confirmed cases were reported, including 679,752 recoveries and 5,432 deaths. More than 10,872,000 COVID-19 tests had been conducted in Belarus to date.

On 23 December, a total of 689,151 confirmed cases were reported, including 681,250 recoveries and 5,449 deaths. More than 10,897,000 COVID-19 tests had been conducted in Belarus to date.

On 24 December, a total of 691,072 confirmed cases were reported, including 683,403 recoveries and 5,466 deaths. More than 10,919,000 COVID-19 tests had been conducted in Belarus to date.

On 25 December, a total of 692,601 confirmed cases were reported, including 685,039 recoveries and 5,484 deaths. More than 10,938,000 COVID-19 tests had been conducted in Belarus to date.

On 26 December, a total of 693,584 confirmed cases were reported, including 686,275 recoveries and 5,499 deaths. More than 10,959,000 COVID-19 tests had been conducted in Belarus to date.

On 27 December, a total of 694,226 confirmed cases were reported, including 686,768 recoveries and 5,512 deaths. More than 10,967,000 COVID-19 tests had been conducted in Belarus to date.

On 28 December, a total of 694,727 confirmed cases were reported, including 687,191 recoveries and 5,528 deaths. More than 10,971,000 COVID-19 tests had been conducted in Belarus to date.

On 29 December, a total of 696,220 confirmed cases were reported, including 688,890 recoveries and 5,543 deaths. More than 10,999,000 COVID-19 tests had been conducted in Belarus to date.

On 30 December, a total of 697,600 confirmed cases were reported, including 690,505 recoveries and 5,561 deaths. More than 11,022,000 COVID-19 tests had been conducted in Belarus to date.

On 31 December, a total of 699,110 confirmed cases were reported, including 692,282 recoveries and 5,578 deaths. More than 11,043,000 COVID-19 tests had been conducted in Belarus to date.

== See also ==
- COVID-19 pandemic in Belarus
- 2020 in Belarus
- Timeline of the COVID-19 pandemic in Belarus (2020)
- Timeline of the COVID-19 pandemic in Belarus (2022)
