= List of owners of English football clubs =

A list of all owners with a significant interest within English football clubs: including their estimated net worth and sources of wealth.

== Premier League ==
Club	Owner(s)	Estimated combined net worth	Source of wealth
Arsenal (more information)	(United States) Stan Kroenke	$21.3B	Commercial property Kroenke Sports & Entertainment; Walmart
Aston Villa (more information)	(Egypt) (United States) V Sports	$10.3B	Investment and Industry; Fortress Investment Group; Comcast
Bournemouth	(United States) William P. Foley	$2.0B	Fidelity National Financial; Vegas Golden Knights
Brentford	(England) Matthew Benham	$280M	Gambling firms
Brighton & Hove Albion	(England) Tony Bloom (75.61%)	$1.3B	Professional gambling, property and land development, investments
Chelsea (more information)	(United States) Clearlake Capital Group (Behdad Eghbali and José E. Feliciano) (Switzerland) Hansjörg Wyss	$13.7B	Investment consortium Los Angeles Dodgers
Coventry City	(England) Doug King		YELO Enterprises, RCMA Capital
Crystal Palace	(England) Steve Parish (10.74%) (United States) Josh Harris (18%) (United States) David Blitzer (18%) (United States) Woody Johnson (43%)	$10.5B	Private equity
Everton (more information)	(United States) The Friedkin Group (Dan Friedkin)	$7.6B	Car dealerships, investment
Fulham (more information)	(United States) Shahid Khan	$15.3B	Flex-N-Gate Corp (automobile parts manufacturer); Jacksonville Jaguars; All Elite Wrestling
Hull City	(Turkey) Acun Ilıcalı		Acun Medya
Ipswich Town	(United States) Gamechanger 20 Ltd.		American Pension Fund
Leeds United	(United States) 49ers Enterprises (Austria) Red Bull	$8.5B	San Francisco 49ers, DeBartolo Corporation, Energy drinks
Liverpool (more information)	(United States) John W. Henry (United States) Tom Werner (England) (India) Amit Bhatia (United States) Jeff Bezos (Brazil) (Singapore) Eduardo Saverin (India) Mittal family	$354.0B	Fenway Sports Group, Breedon Group, AyBe Capital Advisers, Summix Capital, Amazon, Blue Origin, The Washington Post, Bezos Expeditions, Meta Platforms, B Capital, ArcelorMittal, Aperam
Manchester City (more information)	(United Arab Emirates) Abu Dhabi United Group (82%) (United States) Silver Lake (18%)	$16.8B (Note: While the personal wealth of Mansour bin Zayed Al Nahyan is used here, Manchester City are controlled by Abu Dhabi United Group, which internal documents suggest is ultimately managed by the government of the United Arab Emirates. Therefore, as Manchester City are controlled by companies considered state-controlled, the concept of 'net worth' is purposeless and does not apply. The actual value of the controlling entities are ultimately impossible to even guess at. The figures included are simply included as a reference point, and should therefore be taken at face value at best.)	Sovereign wealth Investments
Manchester United (more information)	(United States) Glazer family (51.75%) (England) Sir Jim Ratcliffe (27.7%)	$20.4B	First Allied Corporation (commercial property, retail), Tampa Bay Buccaneers; Ineos Group (chemicals industry)
Newcastle United (more information)	(Saudi Arabia) Public Investment Fund (85%) (state-owned) (England) RB Sports & Media (15%)	$620.0B (Note: As Newcastle United are controlled by companies considered state-owned, the concept of 'net worth' is purposeless and does not apply. The actual value of the controlling entities are ultimately impossible to even guess at. The figures included are simply included as a reference point, and should therefore be taken at face value at best.)	Sovereign wealth
Nottingham Forest	(Greece) Evangelos Marinakis	$3.6B	Capital Maritime & Trading Corp
Sunderland	(France) (Switzerland) Kyril Louis-Dreyfus (64%) (Uruguay) Juan Sartori (36%)	$2.1B	Louis Dreyfus Group (agriculture, commodities, commercial shipping)
Tottenham Hotspur (more information)	(England) Family of Joe Lewis (60%) (England) Daniel Levy (25%)	$5.8B	Currency Trading

== EFL Championship ==
Club	Owner(s)	Estimated combined net worth	Source of wealth
Birmingham City	(United States) Tom Wagner		Sportswear; Knighthead Capital Management
Blackburn Rovers	(India) Anuradha Jitendra Desai (India) Banda Venkatesh Rao (India) Banda Balaji Rao	$2B	Venkateshwara Hatcheries Group (food processing and pharmaceuticals)
Bristol City	(England) Stephen Lansdown	$2.6B	Hargreaves Lansdown (financial services)
Burnley	(United States) Alan Pace (50.38%)		ALK Capital LLC
Charlton Athletic	(England) Charlie Methven (Mexico) Gabriel Brener (United States) Joshua Friedman		Consultancy Investments
Derby County	(England) David Clowes	£252m	Property development
Leicester City	(Thailand) The Srivaddhanaprabha Family	$3.5B	King Power International Group (duty-free shopping)
Middlesbrough	(England) Steve Gibson	$826M	Bulkhaul Limited
Millwall	(United States) John Berylson (United States) Richard Smith	$175M	Chestnut Hill Ventures
Norwich City (more information)	(United States) Mark Attanasio		Milwaukee Brewers
Oxford United	(Indonesia) Erick Thohir	$ 2 B	Investment
Portsmouth	(United States) Michael Eisner	$1B	Media; former CEO of The Walt Disney Company; Tornante
Preston North End	(England) Trevor Hemmings CVO (51.4%)	$1.4B	Blackpool Tower, horse racing, investment, Northern Trust, Sportech
Queens Park Rangers (more information)	(India) Lakshmi Mittal	$32.7B	ArcelorMittal
Sheffield Wednesday	(United States) Arise Capital Partners		
Sheffield United	(United States) COH Sports Group		
Southampton	(England) Sport Republic (80%) (Switzerland) Katharina Liebherr (20%)	$1.3B	United Group (telecoms and mass media); Inheritance
Stoke City	(England) John Coates	$2.7b	Bet365 (online gambling firm)
Swansea City	(United States) Stephen Kaplan & (United States) Jason Levien (68%) (Wales) Swansea City Supporters Trust (21.1%)		Memphis Grizzlies and D.C. United; Investment trust Partially supporter-owned
Watford	(Italy) Gino Pozzo	$120M	Investment
West Bromwich Albion (more information)	(India) (United States) Shilen Patel (Zambia) (India) (United States) Kiran C. Patel	$500M	Investment
West Ham United (more information)	(Czech Republic) Daniel Kretinsky (46%) (England) David Sullivan (40%) J Albert "Tripp" Smith (approx 10%); Vanessa Gold (<5%)	$15.0B	Daily Sport, Sunday Sport; EPH
Wolverhampton Wanderers	(China) Guo Guangchang (China) Liang Xinjun (China) Wang Qunbin	$5.33B	Fosun International (Note: The direct parent company of the club was W.W. (1990) Limited, which was acquired by Prestige Century Holdings Limited; Prestige Century was a subsidiary of Fosun Management Holdings Limited; Fosun Management Holdings was a subsidiary of Fosun International; Fosun International, a listed company of Hong Kong, is a subsidiary of Fosun International Holdings, which was majority owned by Guo Guangchang, Liang Xinjun and Wang Qunbin) (investment, private equity, asset management)
Wrexham	(Canada) (United States) Ryan Reynolds (United States) Rob McElhenney	$450–500M	Acting

== League One ==
Club	Owner(s)	Estimated combined net worth	Source of wealth
AFC Wimbledon	(England) Wimbledon Football Club Supporters' Society		Supporters Trust
Barnsley	(India) Neerav Parekh (United Kingdom) The Cryne Family (Australia) Julie Anne Quay (United States) Chien Lee	$9.1B	NewCity capital Pidilite Industries
Blackpool	(England) Simon Sadler (96.2%)		Asset management
Bolton Wanderers	(England) Football Ventures (Whites) Ltd	$60M	
Bradford City	(Germany) Stefan Rupp (77.5%)	$130M	Investment
Burton Albion	(Sweden) (Norway) (Iceland) (Denmark) (Finland) Nordic Football Group (NFG)		
Cardiff City	(Malaysia) Vincent Tan (51%)	$730M	Berjaya Group
Doncaster Rovers	(England) John Ryan (Scotland) Dick Watson (26%) (England) Terry Bramall		MYA Cosmetic Surgery; Construction; Keepmoat
Exeter City	(England) Exeter City FC Supporters' Trust – Trust Ownership Working Group		Supporter-owned
Huddersfield Town	(United States) Kevin M. Nagle	$500M	Healthcare, pharmaceuticals
Leyton Orient	(United States) GSG LOFC Limited		
Lincoln City	(England) Lincoln City Holdings Ltd (United States) Harvey Jabara (United States) WMA Sports Ventures (United States) Liquid Investments		
Luton Town	(England) Luton Town Football Club 2020 Limited		Supporter-owned
Mansfield Town	(England) John Radford	$38M	One Call Insurance
Northampton Town	(England) Kelvin Thomas (England) David Bower		
Peterborough United	(Republic of Ireland) Darragh MacAnthony (50%) (Canada) Kelgary Sports and Entertainment (50%)		Real estate
Plymouth Argyle	(England) Simon Hallett (97%)		Investment
Port Vale	(England) Carol Shanahan (England) Kevin Shanahan		Synectics Solutions (fintech)
Reading	(United States) Rob Couhig		Redwood Holdings Limited
Rotherham United	(England) Tony Stewart (49%) (England) Joan Stewart (46%)	$180M	Lighting industry
Stevenage	(England) Phil Wallace (91%)	$90M	Lamex Food Group
Stockport County	(England) Mark Stott		Property investment
Wigan Athletic	(England) Mike Danson	$1.63B	GlobalData (data analytics)
Wycombe Wanderers	(Georgia (country)) (Kazakhstan) Mikhail Lomtadze (90%) (England) Wycombe Wanderers Supporters Trust (10%)	$5.9B	Financial services, fintech Partially supporter-owned

== League Two ==
Club	Owner(s)	Estimated combined net worth	Source of wealth
Accrington Stanley	(England) Andy Holt		What More UK
Barnet	(England) Anthony Kleanthous		
Barrow	(England) Tony Shearer (40%) (England) Paul Hornby (20%) (England) Kristian Wilkes (20%) (England) Mark Hetherington (10%) (England) Bluebirds Trust (10%)		
Bristol Rovers	(Jordan) Wael al-Qadi	$550M	Banking and tourism
Bromley	(England) Robin Stanton-Gleaves		
Cambridge United	(England) Paul Barry (75.01%) (United States) Mark Green (24.99%)		Hospitality, technology and property
Cheltenham Town	(England) Mike Garlick		
Chesterfield	(England) Chesterfield Football Club Community Trust		Supporter-owned
Colchester United	(England) Robbie Cowling	$55M	JobServe (employment website)
Crewe Alexandra	(England) Norman Hassall (England) Daniel Potts		The Rowlinson Group
Fleetwood Town	(England) Andy Pilley (98%)	$120M	BES Group (commercial energy supplier)
Gillingham	(United States) Brad Galinson (United States) Shannon Galinson		Property
Grimsby Town	(England) 1878 Partners (63%) (England) The Mariners Trust (14%) (England) Mike Parker (11%)		
Harrogate Town	(England) Irving Weaver		Property
Milton Keynes Dons	(Kuwait) Fahad Al Ghanim		InterMK Group
Newport County	(Wales) Newport County AFC Supporters Trust		Supporter-owned
Notts County	(Denmark) Alexander Reedtz (Denmark) Christoffer Reedtz		Football Radar
Oldham Athletic	(England) Frank Rothwell		
Salford City	(England) Gary Neville (England) David Beckham (United States) Declan Kelly (England) Lord Mervyn Davies	$2.7B	
Shrewsbury Town	(United States) Biscayne ST LLC (Majority shareholder) (United States) Atlantic Football Ventures		
Swindon Town	(Australia) Clem Morfuni	$200m	
Tranmere Rovers	(England) Mark Palios		Charted Accountant Holding Company
Walsall	(Canada) (United States) Benjamin Boycott		Trivela Group LLC

== National League ==
Club	Owner(s)	Estimated combined net worth	Source of wealth
Carlisle United	(United States) Piatak family	$400M-$1B	Magellan Transport Logistics
Forest Green Rovers	(England) Dale Vince (Spain) Héctor Bellerín	$120M	
Sutton United	(South Africa) (United States) Garry Otto (Saudi Arabia) Nawaf Al Shammari	$70m	Investment group
Ebbsfleet United	(Kuwait) Keh Sports Limited		

== National League North/South ==
Club	Owner(s)	Estimated combined net worth	Source of wealth
Blyth Spartans	(United Kingdom) Irfan Liaquat	$50m	
Dagenham & Redbridge	Happy Fan Group; John Grabowski		
Darlington	(England) Darlington FC supporters trusts		

== See also ==
- List of owners of Italian football clubs
