= Fosun (disambiguation) =

Fosun may refer to:

- Fosun Foundation, a Chinese non-profit foundation that was supported by Fosun Group
- Fosun International, a Hong Kong publicly traded company incorporated in 2004, sometimes referred to as Fosun Group
- Fosun Pharmaceutical, a Chinese publicly traded company of which Fosun International was the largest shareholder; full name was Shanghai Fosun Pharmaceutical (Group); formerly known as Fosun Industrial

== See also ==
- Fesun, sometimes spelled as Fosun, a place in Iran
