= Wolverhampton Wanderers F.C. =

Association football club in Wolverhampton, England

Wolverhampton Wanderers
- Full name: Wolverhampton Wanderers Football Club
- Nickname: The Old Gold
- Short name: Wolves
- Founded: 1877; 149 years ago, as St. Luke's F.C.
- Ground: Molineux Stadium
- Capacity: 31,750
- Owner: Fosun International
- Executive chairman: Nathan Shi
- Head coach: César Peixoto
- League: EFL Championship
- 2025–26: Premier League, 20th of 20 (relegated)
- Website: wolves.co.uk
Home colours	Away colours	Third colours

Wolverhampton Wanderers Football Club (/ˌwʊlvərˈhæmptən/ WUUL-vər-HAMP-tən), commonly referred to as Wolves, is a professional football club based in Wolverhampton, England. The club competes in the EFL Championship, the second tier of English football. The club has played at Molineux Stadium since moving from Dudley Road in 1889. The club's traditional kit consists of old gold shirts and socks with black shorts. Since 1979, the kit has also featured the club's "wolf's head" logo. Long-standing rivalries exist with other clubs from the West Midlands, including Aston Villa, Stoke City, and Birmingham City, but the main one is the Black Country derby contested with West Bromwich Albion. Since 2016, the club has been owned by the Chinese conglomerate Fosun International.

Formed as St. Luke's F.C. in 1877, the club changed name to Wolverhampton Wanderers two years later and became one of the founding members of the Football League in 1888. They won the FA Cup for the first time in 1893, and again as a Second Division team in 1908 following the club's relegation two years previously. They fell to the third tier in 1923, but went on to win the Third Division North in 1923–24 and the Second Division in 1931–32. The team was crowned English League champions three times – in 1953–54, 1957–58 and 1958–59 – all under the management of Stan Cullis. Wolves also won another two FA Cup finals, in 1949 and 1960. Relegated in 1965, after 26 consecutive seasons in the top flight, they secured promotion back to the First Division in 1966–67. Wolves won the League Cup in 1974 and 1980, and again won the Second Division title in 1976–77.

Wolves suffered a financial crisis during the early-1980s recession that led to the club coming close to liquidation in 1982. In the five seasons between 1981–82 and 1985–86 Wolves were relegated four times (although there was also one promotion in 1982–83), meaning the club ended up in what was then the Football League Fourth Division (now EFL League Two) for the first (and so far only) time in the club's history. However, the club immediately started a swift turn-around, and having been beaten in the inaugural Football League play-off final in 1987, Wolves won the Fourth Division and Football League Trophy titles in 1987–88, followed by the Third Division title in 1988–89.

After fourteen seasons in the second tier between 1989 and 2003, Wolves reached the Premier League, founded in 1992, for the first time with victory in the 2003 play-offs, though they were relegated after a single season in the top division on this occasion. Wolves won the Championship in 2008–09 to return to the Premier League, but endured relegation in 2011–12, followed by relegation again (to EFL League One) in 2012–13. The club then returned to the Premier League after first winning the League One title in 2013–14, followed by another Championship title in 2017–18.

After becoming one of the first British clubs to install floodlights at its home ground in 1953, Wolves arranged televised "floodlit friendlies" against leading overseas club sides between 1953 and 1956, the most notable being the famous Honved game, which were instrumental in the launch of the European Cup (now known as the UEFA Champions League) in 1955. Wolves reached the quarter-finals of the competition in 1959–60 as well as the semi-finals of the 1960–61 European Cup Winners' Cup and the inaugural UEFA Cup Final in 1972. Following a 39-year absence from UEFA competitions, they reached the UEFA Europa League finals in 2020.

== History ==
=== Formation and the Football League (1879–1893) ===
In the 2000 edition of The Rough Guide to English Football, the history section on the Wolves page begins: "The very name Wolves thunders from the pages of English football history". As with several other clubs, Everton for example, Wolves had humble beginnings shaped by the twin influences of cricket and the church. The club was founded in 1877 as St. Luke's F.C. by John Baynton and John Brodie, two pupils of St Luke's Church School in Blakenhall, who had been presented with a football by their headmaster Harry Barcroft. The team played its first game on 13 January 1877 against a reserve side from Stafford Road, later merging with the football section of a local cricket club called Blakenhall Wanderers to form Wolverhampton Wanderers in August 1879. Having initially played on two strips of land in the town, they relocated to a more substantial venue on Dudley Road in 1881, before lifting their first trophy in 1884 when they won the Wrekin Cup, during a season in which they played their first FA Cup tie. Having become professional, the club were nominated to become one of the twelve founder members of the Football League in 1888, in which they played in the first round of Football League fixtures ever staged, against Aston Villa on 8 September 1888. They ended the inaugural season in third place, as well as reaching their first FA Cup Final, losing 0–3 to the first "Double" winners, Preston North End. At the conclusion of the campaign the club relocated for a final time when they moved to Molineux, then a pleasure park known as the Molineux Grounds.

=== FA Cup success and world war years (1893–1950) ===
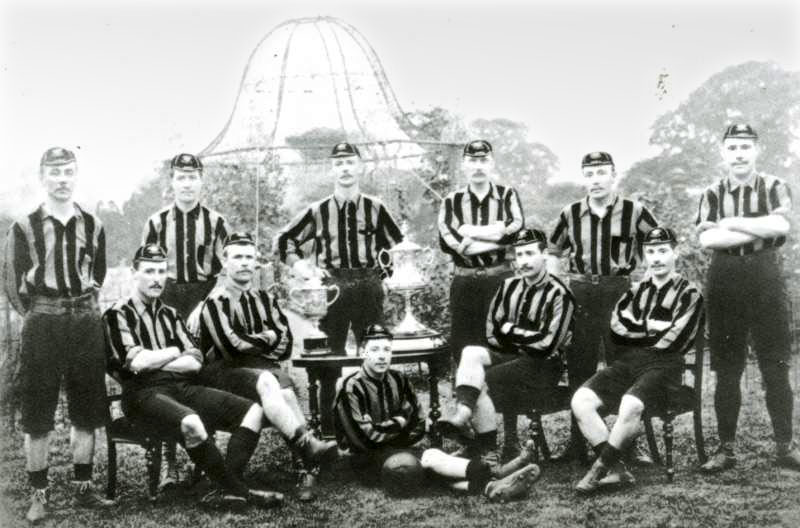
Wolves' 1893 FA Cup-winning team

Wolves lifted the FA Cup for the first time in 1893 when they beat Everton 1–0, and made a third FA Cup Final appearance in 1896. The club added a second FA Cup Final triumph (a 3–1 win against Newcastle United) to their 1893 success in 1908, two years after having dropped into the Second Division for the first time. After struggling during the years either side of the First World War to regain their place in the top division (a period that was punctuated by another FA Cup Final appearance in 1921), the club suffered a further relegation in 1923, entering the Third Division (North), which they won at the first attempt. Eight years after returning to the Second Division, Wolves regained their top-flight status as Second Division Champions under Major Frank Buckley after twenty-six years away. With Buckley at the helm the team became established as one of the leading club sides in England in the years leading up to the Second World War, as they finished runners-up in the league twice in succession (1937–38 & 1938–39), as well as reaching the last pre-war FA Cup Final, in which they suffered a shock defeat to Portsmouth. In 1937–38 Wolves came within a whisker of winning the club's first English league title: a win in the side's last game away to Sunderland would have clinched things, but in the event Wolves lost 0–1 and thus ended the campaign one point behind the eventual champions, Arsenal. One of the things Major Buckley and his Wolves side attracted a lot of attention for in the last two full seasons prior to the suspension of league football during the Second World War was Buckley's insistence that his players be injected with monkey gland extract to enhance their stamina and performance, a practice that the Football League disapproved of but did not prohibit.

When league football resumed after the Second World War, Wolves suffered yet another final day failure in the First Division. Just as in 1938, victory in their last match would have won the title but a 2–1 loss to title rivals Liverpool meant that Liverpool were crowned champions instead. This game had been the last in a Wolves shirt for Stan Cullis, and a year later he became manager of the club. In Cullis's first season in charge, he led Wolves to a first major honour in 41 years as they beat Leicester City to lift the FA Cup, and a year later, only goal average prevented Wolves winning the league title.

=== The Stan Cullis era (1950–1960) ===
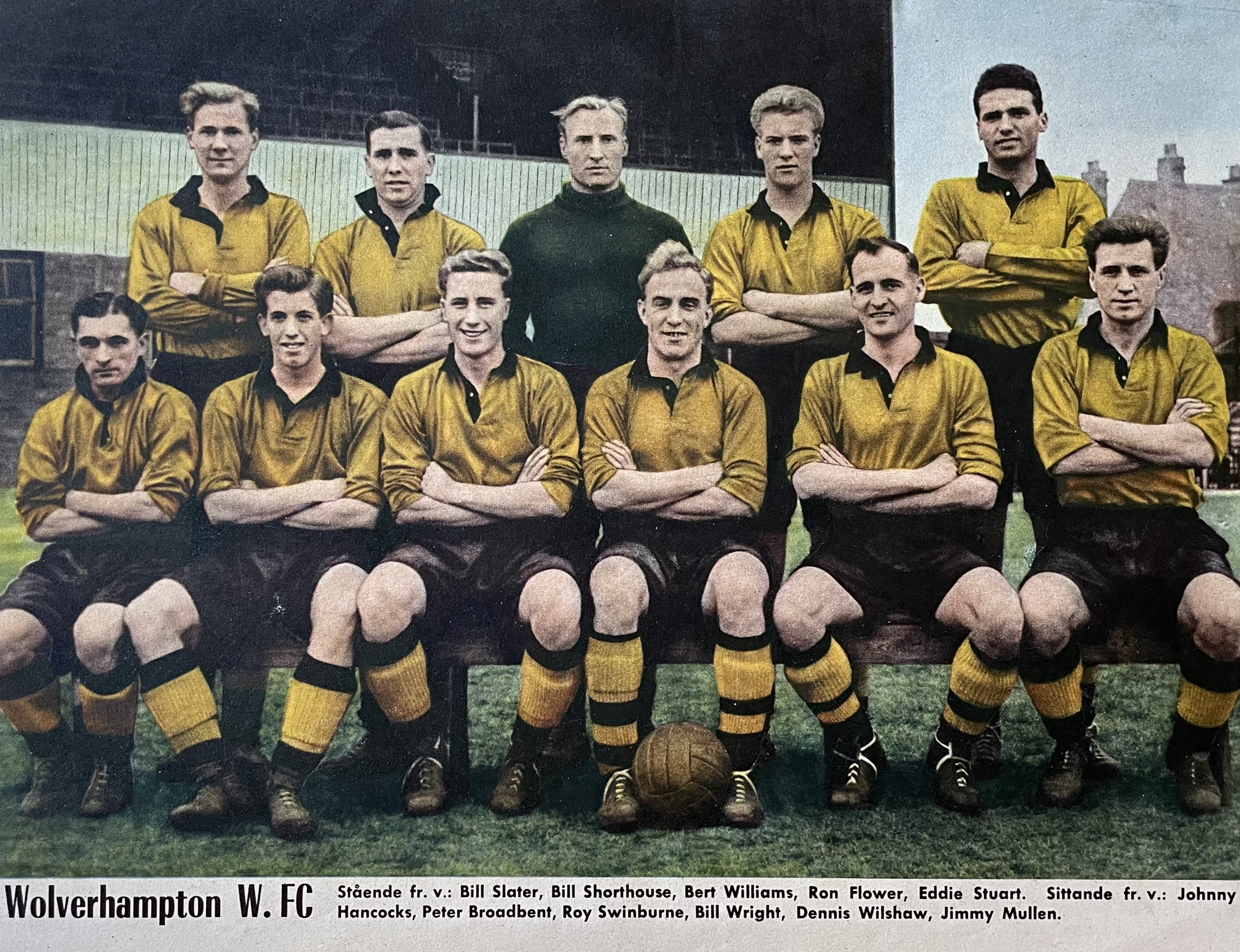
Wolverhampton Wanderers F.C., side at 1955 with following players, from left standing: Bill Slater, Bill Shorthouse, Bert Williams, Ron Flowers, Eddie Stuart; front row: Johnny Hancocks, Peter Broadbent, Roy Swinbourne, Billy Wright (captain), Dennis Wilshaw and Jimmy Mullen.

The 1950s were by far the most successful period in the club's history. Captained by Billy Wright, Wolves finally claimed the league championship for the first time in 1953–54, overhauling local rivals West Bromwich Albion late in the season. Two further titles were soon won in successive years (1957–58 and 1958–59), as Wolves vied with Manchester United to be acknowledged the premier team in English football at that juncture. Wolves were renowned both for the club's domestic success and for the staging of high-profile "floodlit friendlies" against other top club sides from around the world. Wolves had become one of the first club sides in Britain to invest in floodlighting in 1953 at a cost of £10,000 (equivalent to £200,000 in 2025). Perhaps the most famed of these friendlies saw Wolves defeat a Honvéd side including many members of the Hungarian national team that had recently humbled England twice, leading the national media to proclaim Wolves "Champions of the World". This became the final spur for Gabriel Hanot, the editor of L'Équipe, to propose the creation of the European Cup (later rebranded as the UEFA Champions League). Wolves were one of the first British clubs to participate. In the 1957–58 season, Wolves defeated Real Madrid 5–4 (3–2 in Wolverhampton and 2–2 in Madrid) in home and away friendlies.

=== Cup success in the '60s and '70s (1960–1980) ===
Chart of yearly performance of Wolves in the English Football League system.

The 1960s began with a fourth FA Cup victory and Wolves almost achieved the first League and FA Cup 'double' of the 20th century in English football. They were pipped to the league title by a point on the final day of the season by Burnley. Despite that bright start to the decade, the 1960s saw Wolves begin to decline. After finishing as league runners-up in 1959–60 and a creditable third-place league finish in Tottenham Hotspur's 'double'-winning season, the team faded and Cullis himself was dismissed after sixteen years in post in September 1964 after a disastrous start to the 1964–65 season. Cullis's dismissal did not prevent the season ending with relegation (the first time Wolves had known relegation since 1922–23) and the club's first spell outside the top division since 1932. Exile from the top flight lasted only two seasons however, as Wolves were promoted in 1967 as Second Division runners-up.

During the close season in 1967, Wolves played a mini-season in North America as part of the fledgling United Soccer Association league which imported clubs from Europe and South America. Playing as the "Los Angeles Wolves", they won the Western Division and ultimately the championship by defeating the Eastern Division champions Washington Whips (import of Aberdeen) in a final decider.

The club's return to the English top flight in 1967 heralded another period of relative success under Bill McGarry, with a fourth place league finish in 1971 qualifying Wolves for the newly created UEFA Cup. En route to the UEFA Cup final, they defeated Juventus and Ferencváros before losing to Tottenham Hotspur 3–2 on aggregate; a 2–1 home defeat in the first leg proving decisive. Wolves lifted silverware two years later when they won the League Cup for the first time by beating Manchester City 2–1 in the final. Despite relegation again in 1976, Wolves bounced back at the first attempt as Second Division champions under manager Sammy Chung, and then under manager John Barnwell, the turn of the decade saw them finish in the top six in the league and win the 1980 League Cup, when then-record signing Andy Gray scored the only goal of the final to defeat the reigning European champions and League Cup holders Nottingham Forest.

=== Financial crisis, decline and recovery (1980–1990) ===
The multi-million pound rebuilding of the Molineux Street Stand in 1979 was the catalyst for the club's near-financial ruin during the next decade. Plunging match attendances in the early 1980s, at least partly due to recession in both the national and local economies, and consequent difficulties in repaying the loans taken out to fund the new John Ireland Stand, led the club to receivership and relegation in 1982. After a shareholders’ rebellion against Harry Marshall led by Wolverhampton insurance-broker Roger Jeffrey Hipkiss, the club was saved from liquidation at the last minute when it was purchased by a consortium fronted by Hipkiss's close friend and its former player Derek Dougan. The takeover, financed by two Saudi brothers, Mahmud and Mohammad Bhatti of the company Allied Properties, brought immediate promotion back to the First Division under manager Graham Hawkins, but the Bhattis' failure to invest sufficiently in the club soon saw things unravel, and the team suffered three consecutive relegations through the football divisions under different managers, as well as the almost-constant threat of the club being wound-up.

In 1986, with the club again in receivership, a deal saw Wolverhampton City Council purchase the stadium and surrounding land, while a local developer paid off the club's outstanding debts in return for planning permission to develop the land adjacent to the stadium. The 1986–87 season saw Wolves' first campaign in the Fourth Division where, with the guidance of new manager Graham Turner, and goals from Steve Bull, who ultimately scored a club record 306 goals, the team reached the final of the inaugural play-offs but were denied promotion by Aldershot. Building on that, in the next two seasons the team achieved both the Fourth and Third Division championships, and won the 1988 Football League Trophy Final at Wembley.

=== The Hayward years (1990–2007) ===
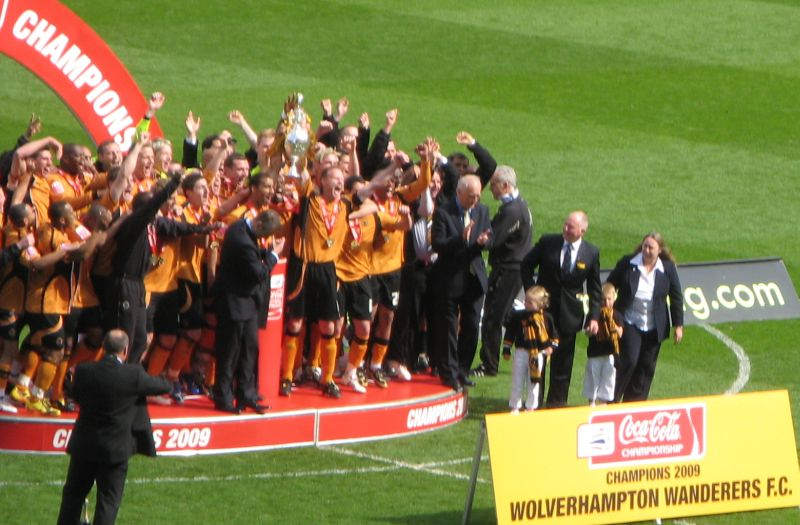
Celebrating the Championship title in 2009

Lifelong fan Jack Hayward purchased the club in 1990 and immediately funded the extensive redevelopment of a by then dilapidated Molineux into a modern all-seater stadium. With work completed in 1993, Hayward redirected his investment onto the playing side in an attempt to win promotion to the newly formed Premier League. Despite substantial spending, neither Graham Taylor nor Mark McGhee could fulfil this, both managers leading the team to play-off defeats at the semi-final stages in 1995 and 1997 respectively. It was not until 2003 that Wolves were promoted, when they defeated Sheffield United 3–0 in the play-off final under Dave Jones to end a 19-year absence from the top level. Their stay proved short-lived however as they were immediately relegated back to the newly retitled EFL Championship.

=== Promotion, relegations and turbulent times (2007–2016) ===
After former England manager Glenn Hoddle failed to bring a swift return to the Premier League, the rebuilding of the squad by Mick McCarthy rejuvenated the club with an unexpected play-off finish. The club was bought from Sir Jack Hayward by Steve Morgan in 2007 and two years later the team returned to the Premier League as 2008–09 Football League Championship title winners. Wolves successfully battled relegation for two seasons before McCarthy's dismissal in the 2011–12 season, which precipitated relegation under his former assistant Terry Connor, who was promoted to replace McCarthy.

Following relegation, Norwegian Ståle Solbakken became the club's first overseas manager but his tenure lasted only six months before a poor run of results saw him replaced by Dean Saunders in January 2013. Saunders failed to bring any upturn, culminating in both the club's relegation to EFL League One, a level the club had not played at since 1989, and Saunders's own dismissal. Following this, Kenny Jackett was appointed in May 2013 in the retitled position of head coach, and led the team back to the EFL Championship in his first season, setting a new club record points total of 103 which at the time was also an all-time record for the most points accumulated by any team during a Tier 3 season, until the 2024-25 EFL League One season when local rivals Birmingham City managed to achieve a points total of 111.

=== Fosun era: Return to the Premier League and continental football (2016–2021) ===
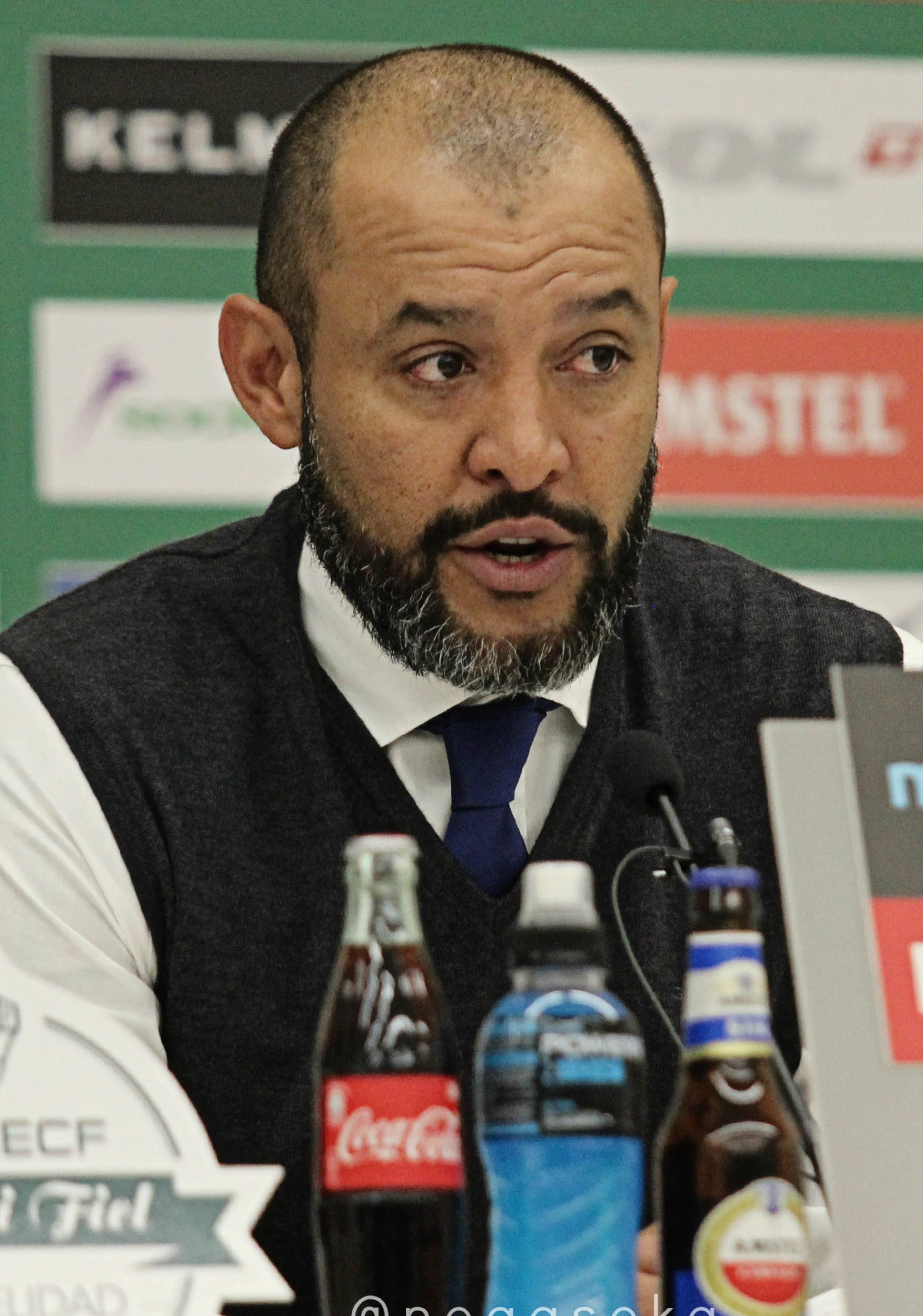
Manager Nuno Espírito Santo led Wolves back to the Premier League in 2018, and into European competition for the first time in 39 years

On 21 July 2016, Chinese investment group Fosun International bought the club's parent company, W.W. (1990) Ltd, from Steve Morgan and his own company Bridgemere Group for a reported £45 million, with Jez Moxey stepping down from his role as a CEO and replaced by managing director Laurie Dalrymple. The new owners dismissed Kenny Jackett and brought in former Italian international Walter Zenga as head coach. Zenga was axed after just 14 league games and Paul Lambert appointed as his successor in November. At the end of the season, Lambert too was dismissed, with former Porto boss Nuno Espírito Santo replacing him. Under Nuno, Wolves won the 2017–18 EFL Championship title and returned to the Premier League after a six-year absence.

Wolverhampton Wanderers finished seventh on their return to the Premier League, their highest position in the top division since finishing sixth in 1979–80, earning a spot in the qualification rounds of the UEFA Europa League, thus invoking their first continental campaign since 1980–81. They lost to that season's eventual winners Sevilla 0–1 in a modified single-leg quarter-final played in a neutral venue in Germany due to the COVID-19 pandemic in Europe. Wolves replicated their previous season's seventh-place finish in the Premier League in 2019–20 but with two more points and only missed out on a return to continental competition, both on goal difference and Arsenal winning that season's FA Cup.

=== Managed decline and relegation (2021–2026) ===
In the 2020–21 season, Wolves lost striker Raúl Jiménez to a season-ending injury (a fractured skull) in November, and subsequently struggled for goals for the remainder of the campaign, finishing 13th. Espírito Santo left "by mutual consent", and was replaced by former Benfica head coach Bruno Lage. In 2021–22, the club finished tenth. Wolves dismissed Lage on 2 October 2022 after eight games of the 2022–23 season with only one win and just three goals scored. Former Real Madrid, Spain and Sevilla manager Julen Lopetegui replaced him. Despite being in 20th place in the league before his first Premier League game, Lopetegui guided Wolves to a 13th-place finish. He left prior to the 2023–24 season due to a dispute over limited transfer funds, and was replaced by former Bournemouth coach Gary O'Neil. O'Neil was sacked in December 2024 with the club in 19th position and was replaced by Portuguese manager Vítor Pereira on a contract lasting until June 2026. Pereira was sacked on 2 November 2025 after failing to win any of his first ten games and the club sitting bottom of the league table. Rob Edwards was appointed coach on 12 November 2025. On 20 April 2026, following West Ham's goalless draw away to Crystal Palace, Wolves were relegated to the 2026–27 EFL Championship, thus ending their eight-year run in the Premier League.

== Colours and badge ==
Original colours.

The club's traditional colours of gold and black allude to the city council's motto "out of darkness cometh light" with the two colours representing light and darkness respectively. Although the team's original colours upon formation were red and white, adopted from the school colours of St Lukes, for much of their history their home colours have been their distinctive old gold shirts with black shorts.

In the early decades of the club a variety of shirt designs using these colours were created, including stripes and diagonal halves, until the continual usage of a plain shirt design since the 1930s. Before the 1960s a darker shade of gold was used, known as "old gold", which is still often cited in the media as the club's colour.

City coat of arms.

Like most English teams, their earliest shirts usually only featured a badge on special occasions such as cup finals. The first such badge to be worn on Wolves shirts was the coat of arms of the County Borough of Wolverhampton. In the late 1960s, Wolves introduced their own club badge that appeared on their shirts consisting of a single leaping wolf, which later became three leaping wolves in the mid-1970s. Since 1979 the badge has consisted of a single "wolf head" design; the current badge was last redesigned in 2002.

In May 2019, the club won a legal challenge by Peter Davies, a 71 year old retired building industry manager, who claimed he drew the wolf head motif as a schoolboy in the 1960s and entered it in an art competition. Mr Davies said he came up with the angular design after a teacher asked him to demonstrate an understanding of Blaise Pascal's Hexagrammum Mysticum Theorem, and entered it in an art competition advertised in the Express and Star newspaper. Mr Davies had made a copyright claim and wanted compensation. Mr Davies lost his copyright infringement claim and now faces legal fees and costs estimated to be about £450,000.

Wolves' traditional away colours have been all-white, but recent decades have seen a variety of colours used, including black, blue, teal, purple and maroon.

=== Kit manufacturers and sponsors ===
Period	Kit manufacturer	Shirt sponsor (centre)	Shirt sponsor (sleeve)
1974–1982	Umbro	No sponsor	No sponsor
1982–1985	Umbro	Tatung	No sponsor
1985–1986	Umbro	No sponsor	No sponsor
1986	Umbro	Benjamin Perry	No sponsor
1986–1988	Spall	Staw	No sponsor
1988–1990	Scoreline	Manders Paint & Ink	No sponsor
1990	Scoreline	Goodyear	No sponsor
1990–1992	Bukta	Goodyear	No sponsor
1992–1994	Molineux	Goodyear	No sponsor
1994–1996	Nutmeg	Goodyear	No sponsor
1996–2000	Puma	Goodyear	No sponsor
2000–2002	Wolves Leisure	Goodyear	No sponsor
2002–2004	Admiral	Doritos	No sponsor
2004–2009	Le Coq Sportif	Chaucer Consulting	No sponsor
2009–2010	Le Coq Sportif	Sportingbet	No sponsor
2010–2013	Burrda	Sportingbet	No sponsor
2013–2015	Puma	WhatHouse?	No sponsor
2015–2016	Puma	Silverbug	No sponsor
2016–2018	Puma	The Money Shop	No sponsor
2018–2019	Adidas	W88	CoinDeal
2019–2020	Adidas	ManBetX	CoinDeal
2020–2021	Adidas	ManBetX	Aeroset
2021–2022	Castore	ManBetX	Bitci.com
2022–2023	Castore	AstroPay	12BET
2023–2024	Castore	AstroPay	6686 Sports
2024–2026	Sudu	DEBET	JD Sports
2026–	Sudu	Midnite	Wolf Competitions

== Stadium ==
=== Former grounds ===
When first founded the club used a field on Goldthorn Hill in the Blakenhall area as its home, which could accommodate some 2,000 spectators. In 1879 they relocated to John Harper's Field on Lower Villiers Street where they remained for two years before a short move to Dudley Road, with the new ground situated opposite the Fighting Cocks Inn. It was here that they played their first FA Cup tie in 1883 and their first Football League fixture in September 1888. Although the site could only hold 2,500 spectators at first it was eventually developed to be capable of 10,000.

=== Molineux ===
Molineux
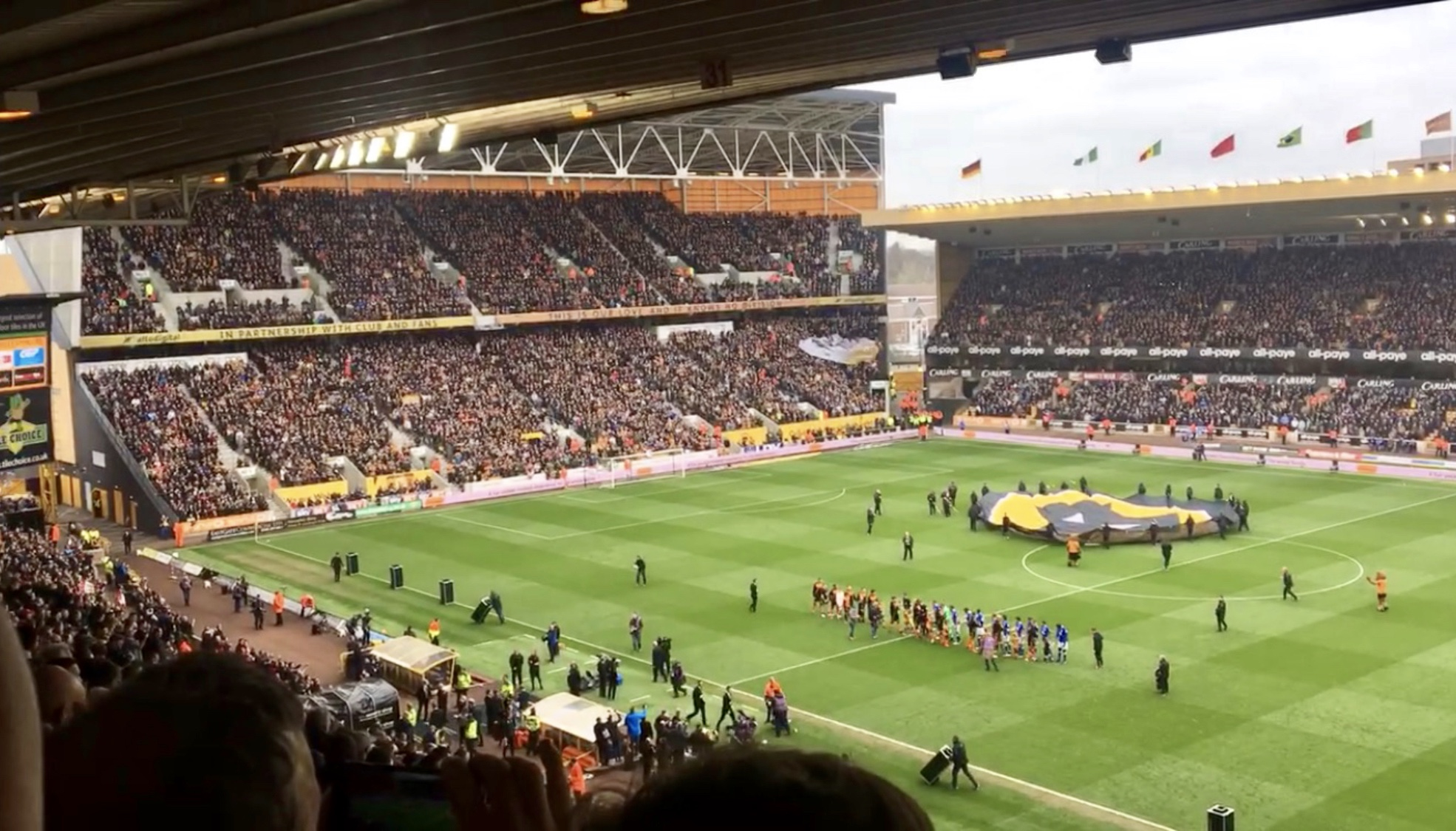
- Molineux Stadium, Wolverhampton, 2018
- Capacity: 31,750

Construction
- Renovated: 1924–34; 1978–79; 1991–93
- Expanded: 2011–12
- Architects: Alan Cotterell (Billy Wright & Sir Jack Hayward stands); AFL (Stan Cullis stand); Atherden & Rutter (Steve Bull stand)
- Main contractors: Alfred McAlpine (3 stands); Buckingham Group (Stan Cullis stand)

Tenant
- Wolverhampton Wanderers (1889–present)

In the summer of 1889 the club moved to its permanent home ever since, Molineux, in the Whitmore Reans area of the city. The stadium name originates from the Molineux House built in the area by Benjamin Molineux, a local merchant, in the 18th century and whose grounds were later developed to include numerous public leisure facilities. When the Northampton Brewery Company purchased these grounds in 1889, they rented their use to the city's football club, who were seeking to find a home more befitting a Football League member. After renovating the site, the first ever official game was staged on 7 September 1889 before a crowd of 4,000. The ground was capable of hosting 20,000 spectators, although English football crowds rarely reached that number in the 19th century.

Wolves bought the freehold in 1923 and soon began a series of ground improvements under the auspices of Archibald Leitch, beginning with the construction of a major grandstand on the Waterloo Road side. In 1932, the club also built a new stand on the Molineux Street side and followed this by adding a roof to the South Bank two years later; this South Bank was historically the second largest of all Kop ends in the country and regularly held crowds in excess of 30,000. The stadium finally now had four complete stands that would form its basis for the next half-century.

In the days before seating regulations, the ground could hold more than 60,000 spectators, with the record attendance being 61,315 for a First Division match against Liverpool on 11 February 1939. The 1940s and 1950s saw average attendances for seasons regularly exceed 40,000, coinciding with the club's peak on the field. During this time Molineux became one of the first British grounds to install floodlights, enabling it to host a series of midweek friendlies against teams from around the globe. In the days prior to the formation of the European Cup and international club competitions, these games were highly prestigious and gained huge crowds and interest, with the BBC often televising such events.

When the Molineux Street Stand failed to meet new safety legislation, the club began building a new replacement stand behind the existing one on land where housing had been demolished. This new all-seater stand – named the John Ireland Stand after the then-club president – was completed in 1979 and was the first stage of a plan to rebuild the entire stadium. The cost of the Ireland Stand escalated to over £2 million and plunged the club into a financial crisis. As a result, it was forced to enter receivership in 1982. By the time the team dropped into the Fourth Division in 1986, only the John Ireland Stand and the South Bank terrace remained in use. New safety laws were implemented following the Bradford City stadium fire and these forced the closure of both the now-dilapidated North Bank and Waterloo Road Stand. The club did not have the funds necessary to rebuild them.

Following the takeover of the club by Sir Jack Hayward in 1990, £8.5 million of funding was made available to redevelop Molineux comprehensively. Between August 1991 and December 1993 three sides of the stadium were completely rebuilt to form a 28,525 capacity all-seater stadium that complied with the Taylor Report: the Waterloo Road Stand was replaced by the Billy Wright Stand, the North Bank terrace by the Stan Cullis Stand, and the South Bank terrace by the Sir Jack Hayward Stand (named the Jack Harris Stand until 2015). Aside from the addition of a temporary seating area in the southwest corner used during Wolves' seasons in the Premier League; this redevelopment formed the stadium for almost twenty years.

In 2010, plans were unveiled for an extensive redevelopment programme to enlarge the capacity and develop the facilities. The first stage of this saw a new two-tier Stan Cullis Stand become fully operational for the 2012–13 season, raising the current official capacity to 31,700. The proposed second stage concerned the rebuilding of the oldest stand at the stadium (built in 1979 as the John Ireland Stand and renamed the Steve Bull Stand in 2003) to increase capacity to around 36,000, but this and any further work was shelved when it became likely that the club would be relegated from the Premier League in 2012.

Ground redevelopments were once again placed on the agenda following the club's acquisition by Fosun in 2016. In contrast to previously mooted plans, it was publicly revealed in February 2019 that future plans consisting of the demolition and full rebuild of the Steve Bull Stand, followed by the redevelopment of the Sir Jack Hayward Stand, to raise the stadium capacity to 45–46,000, were under active consideration. However, in 2020, the club announced more modest plans for making gradual improvements to the stadium as the club seeks to retain its unique character, and enable prioritisation of investment in the playing side of the club.

== Players ==
=== First-team squad ===
As of 12 September 2026

Note: Flags indicate national team as defined under FIFA eligibility rules; some limited exceptions apply. Players may hold more than one non-FIFA nationality.

No.	Pos.	Nation	Player
1	GK	POR	José Sá (vice-captain)
2	DF	ENG	Kieran Trippier
3	DF	ESP	Hugo Bueno
5	MF	ZIM	Marshall Munetsi
7	MF	BRA	André
8	MF	WAL	Jordan James (on loan from Rennes)
9	FW	MEX	Raúl Jiménez
10	FW	ENG	Adam Armstrong
11	FW	BFA	Bertrand Traoré
12	MF	MLI	Boubacar Traoré
13	GK	POR	João Virgínia
14	FW	ENG	Sean Neave (on loan from Newcastle United)
15	DF	COL	Yerson Mosquera
19	FW	COM	Rafiki Saïd

No.	Pos.	Nation	Player
20	MF	ENG	Tommy Doyle
21	FW	POR	Rodrigo Gomes
23	FW	ZIM	Tawanda Chirewa
24	DF	POR	Toti Gomes (captain)
26	GK	ENG	John Ruddy
27	MF	HAI	Jean‐Ricner Bellegarde
28	MF	ESP	Fer López
30	FW	PAR	Enso González
33	DF	CIV	Ghislain Konan
34	DF	BFA	Nasser Djiga
36	FW	POR	Mateus Mané
37	DF	CZE	Ladislav Krejčí
38	DF	CMR	Jackson Tchatchoua
74	MF	ENG	Tom Edozie

=== Out on loan ===
Note: Flags indicate national team as defined under FIFA eligibility rules; some limited exceptions apply. Players may hold more than one non-FIFA nationality.

No.	Pos.	Nation	Player
4	DF	URU	Santiago Bueno (at América until 30 June 2027)
6	DF	NOR	David Møller Wolfe (at Hamburger SV until 30 June 2027)
11	FW	KOR	Hwang Hee-chan (at Schalke 04 until 30 June 2027)

No.	Pos.	Nation	Player
14	FW	NGR	Tolu Arokodare (at Ajax until 30 June 2027)
17	DF	BRA	Pedro Lima (at São Paulo until 30 June 2027)
31	GK	ENG	Sam Johnstone (at Celtic until 30 June 2027)

=== Development squad and Academy ===
Wolverhampton Wanderers Under-23s are competing in Division 2 of the Premier League 2 during the current season, following relegation from the highest level after the previous season was curtailed and decided on a point-per-game basis. The team qualifies as an entrant in Premier League 2 by virtue of Wolves's academy holding Category 1 status. Although the league is designed for players aged 23 and below, three overage players may also feature. Home games are primarily staged at Kidderminster Harriers' Aggborough home.

=== Wolves Women ===
Originally founded in 1975, Wolves Women became the club's official women's team in 2008. They currently play at the third level of English women's football in the FA Women's National League North. Their home games are played at the New Bucks Head Ground in Telford.

== Player of the Year ==
Year	Winner
1977	(England) Steve Daley
1978	(England) Bob Hazell
1979	(Wales) George Berry
1980	(Scotland) Willie Carr
1981	(England) Paul Bradshaw
1982	(England) Paul Bradshaw
1983	(England) John Burridge
1984	(England) Alan Dodd
1985	(England) Tim Flowers
1986	(England) Floyd Streete
1987	(England) Steve Stoutt
1988	(England) Steve Bull
1989	(England) Andy Mutch

Year	Winner
1990	(England) Mark Venus
1991	(England) Mike Stowell
1992	(Scotland) Tom Bennett
1993	(England) Paul Cook
1994	(England) Andy Thompson
1995	(England) Mark Rankine
1996	(England) Steve Bull
1997	(England) Steve Bull
1998	(England) Keith Curle
1999	(Australia) Kevin Muscat
2000	(France) Ludovic Pollet
2001	(England) Lee Naylor
2002	(Scotland) Alex Rae

Year	Winner
2003	(England) Joleon Lescott
2004	(Senegal) Henri Camara
2005	(England) Joleon Lescott
2006	(Scotland) Kenny Miller
2007	(England) Matt Murray
2008	(Wales) Wayne Hennessey
2009	(Republic of Ireland) Kevin Foley
2010	(England) Jody Craddock
2011	(England) Matt Jarvis
2012	(Wales) Wayne Hennessey
2013	(Mali) Bakary Sako
2014	(Scotland) Kevin McDonald
2015	(England) Richard Stearman

Year	Winner
2016	(Republic of Ireland) Matt Doherty
2017	(Angola) Hélder Costa
2018	(Portugal) Rúben Neves
2019	(Mexico) Raúl Jiménez
2020	(Mexico) Raúl Jiménez
2021	(Portugal) Pedro Neto
2022	(Portugal) José Sá
2023	(Portugal) Rúben Neves
2024	(Gabon) Mario Lemina
2025	(Brazil) João Gomes
2026	(Uruguay) Santiago Bueno

== Club officials ==
Coaching Staff

- Head Coach: (Portugal) César Peixoto
- Assistant Coach: (Portugal) Leandro Morais
- Assistant Coach: (Portugal) Diogo Coutinho
- First Team Coach: (Portugal) Rodrigo Fernandes
- First Team Coach: (Portugal) Andre Lopes
- Physical Performance Coach: (Portugal) Sérgio Teixeira
- Goalkeeper Coach: (Portugal) Pedro Miranda
- Under-21 Head Coach: (England) Richard Walker
- Under-18 Head Coach: (England) Karl Broadhurst
- Academy Director: (England) Jonathan Hunter-Barrett
- Academy Coach: (Germany) Christian Preußer
- Academy Coach: (England) Ian Sharps

Medical Staff

- Club Doctor: (Myanmar) Kai Win
- Physiotherapist: (England) Ollie Leaper
- Physiotherapist: (England) Matt Butterfield
- Head of Sports Therapist: (England) Danny Fishwick
- Therapist: (Portugal) Rui Fuste
- Soft-Tissue Therapist: (England) Gregg Jones

Support Staff

- Head of High Performance: (England) Phil Hayward
- First Team Sports Scientist: (England) Kieron Morrisey
- First Team Sports Scientist: (England) Sam Cook
- First Team Sports Scientist: (England) Mark Piros-Read
- First Team Goalkeeper Sports Scientist: vacant
- First Team Data Scientist: (United States) Tom Male
- First Team Performance Analyst: (England) John Boston
- Head of Kit and Equipment: (England) Sean Ruiz
- Kit and Equipment Assistant: (England) Steve Hooper
- Kit and Equipment Assistant: (England) Ian Round
- Kit and Equipment Assistant: (England) Aron

Club Executives

- Owner: Fosun International (Note: The direct parent company of the club was W.W. (1990) Limited, which was acquired by Prestige Century Holdings Limited; Prestige Century was a subsidiary of Fosun Management Holdings Limited; Fosun Management Holdings was a subsidiary of Fosun International; Fosun International, a listed company of Hong Kong, is a subsidiary of Fosun International Holdings, which was majority owned by Guo Guangchang, Liang Xinjun and Wang Qunbin)
- Executive Chairman: Nathan Shi
- General Manager – Football Operations: Matt Wild
- General Manager – Marketing & Commercial Growth: Russell Jones
- WW (1990) Limited Directors: John Makowiec and Christy Gu
- Non-Executive Directors: John Bowater and John Gough
- Honorary Vice-presidents: Steve Bull, Robert Plant and John Richards

== Former players and managers ==
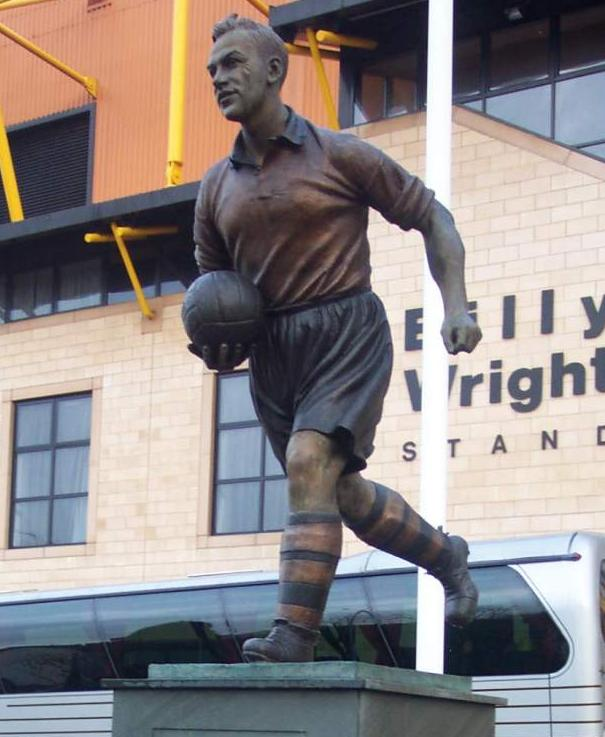
Statue of Billy Wright outside Molineux Stadium

=== Notable players ===
For details on all former players, see List of Wolverhampton Wanderers F.C. players

The club has been represented by numerous high-profile players over the years, most notably Billy Wright, who captained England a record 90 times and was the first player to win a century of international caps, as well as earning the Footballer of the Year Award (in 1952), an accolade also won by Wolves half-back Bill Slater in 1960. In total, 36 players have won full England caps during their time with Wolves, including the club's former captain Conor Coady as well as the club's record goalscorer Steve Bull, who was the last of the club's England internationals to play in a major tournament.

Andy Gray, Emlyn Hughes, Paul Ince and Denis Irwin are all previous League Championship medal winners who have also represented Wolves. Joleon Lescott went on to play for England 26 times scoring once. Robbie Keane went on to become Ireland's all-time leading goalscorer with 68 goals in 146 appearances.

The Wolverhampton Wanderers Hall of Fame has inducted the following former players:

- (England) Mike Bailey
- (England) Peter Broadbent
- (England) Steve Bull
- (England) Stan Cullis
- (Northern Ireland) Derek Dougan
- (Scotland) Malcolm Finlayson
- (England) Ron Flowers
- (England) Johnny Hancocks
- (England) Billy Harrison
- (England) Kenny Hibbitt
- (England) Jackery Jones
- (Portugal) Diogo Jota
- (England) John McAlle
- (England) Jimmy Mullen
- (England) Andy Mutch
- (England) Derek Parkin
- (England) John Richards
- (England) Bill Slater
- (England) Roy Swinbourne
- (England) Andy Thompson
- (England) Dave Wagstaffe
- (England) Bert Williams
- (England) Billy Wright

=== Managerial history ===
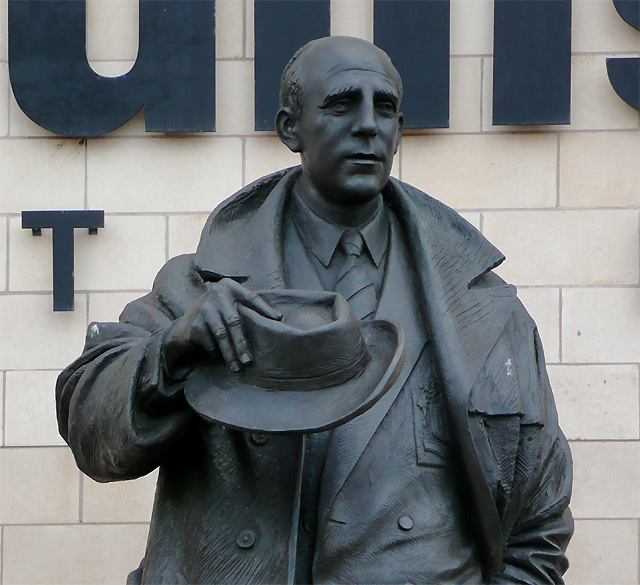
Statue of Stan Cullis outside Molineux.

Wolves have had 32 different (permanently appointed) managers during the club's existence. The first manager, George Worrall, was identified by the title of "club secretary", a post that continued until the appointment of a full-time manager in the modern sense was made in 1922.

The club's most successful manager is Stan Cullis, whose 16-year tenure brought all three of Wolves' league championships as well as two FA Cup triumphs. Two other managers have been inducted into the Club Hall of Fame: Major Frank Buckley and Graham Turner. Turner oversaw two successive divisional championship wins in the late-1980s, winning the Fourth Division title in 1987-88 and the Third Division title the following season. Bill McGarry and John Barnwell both won the League Cup for Wolves in the 1970s and 1980s.

In the 21st century, Dave Jones, Mick McCarthy and Nuno Espírito Santo have led the club into the Premier League. Kenny Jackett took Wolves to a record EFL League One (Tier 3) points haul of 103 as they won this division in 2013–14.

Ståle Solbakken became Wolves' first foreign manager under Steve Morgan's ownership, followed later by Walter Zenga, two Portuguese managers Nuno Espírito Santo and Bruno Lage, and Julen Lopetegui who is Spanish, under current owners Fosun.

Wolves have also been managed by two former England national team managers in Graham Taylor and Glenn Hoddle.

== Support ==
As well as having numerous supporters' clubs across the United Kingdom, Wolverhampton Wanderers also have an international support base, with supporters' clubs in Australia, United States, Sweden, Spain, Germany, Republic of Ireland, Malta, Iceland and Norway amongst others. They have a particularly sizeable Scandinavian fanbase, due to the area's television coverage of Midlands football in the 1970s when the club were a regular top-flight team; the first English match shown live in both Sweden and Norway involved Wolves (Wolverhampton Wanderers 1–0 Sunderland in the Football League First Division on Saturday, 29 November 1969).

=== Rivalries ===
Wolves' longest-established and strongest rivalry is with West Bromwich Albion, against whom the club contest the Black Country derby. The two clubs, separated by eleven miles, have faced each other 163 times; with the Baggies winning 65, Wolves winning 54 and 44 ending in a draw. Their first competitive clash being an FA Cup tie in 1886. A national survey by the football pools found the rivalry to be the strongest in English football. Both clubs are founder members of the Football League and the two once contested the league title in 1953–54, with Wolves finishing as champions.

Wolves also share rivalries with the two Birmingham clubs, Aston Villa and Birmingham City, against whom there have been numerous matches dating back to the 19th century. Wolves' closest geographic rival is actually Walsall but, as they have rarely competed at the same level, it is of less significance. As Wolverhampton historically sat within the boundaries of Staffordshire, a Staffordshire derby between Wolves and Stoke City is also recognised.

The 2018–19 Premier League season was the first and only time ever that Wolves were the sole representatives of the West Midlands in the top flight of English football. The 2020–21 Premier League season saw Wolves play against both Aston Villa and West Bromwich Albion. Since Albion's relegation at the end of that season, Aston Villa has been Wolves' only West Midlands rival in the Premier League.

=== Fan culture ===
During the club's peak in the 1950s, the home crowd's signature song was "The Happy Wanderer", which was a chart hit in the U.K. in 1954 when Wolves first won the league title. In more recent times, "Hi Ho Silver Lining" – a 1967 rock song by Jeff Beck with its chorus modified to "Hi Ho Wolverhampton!" – has become a staple feature of home games. "The Liquidator" instrumental by the Harry J. Allstars was also popularly used in the stadium until a request from the West Midlands Police to cease due to concerns that the obscene lyrics used by some fans during the chorus could incite trouble.

The club attracted a number of hooligans in the 1960s. During the late 1970s and early 1980s, a hooligan firm named "The Subway Army" would often ambush fans in the subway adjacent to the ground. The group was gradually broken up and virtually ceased to exist due to a large number of arrests – many as part of the police's nationwide "Operation GROWTH" (or "Get Rid of Wolverhampton's Troublesome Hooligans") in the late 1980s.

The club invites interaction with its supporters and has a Fans' Parliament, at which independently selected candidates meet with club officials discuss issues relating to the club. An independent fanzine named A Load of Bull (ALOB), in part a reference to leading goalscorer Steve Bull, published supporters' views between 1989 and 2012.

== Ownership and finances ==
The club is owned by the Chinese conglomerate group Fosun International, which purchased the parent company of the club, W.W. (1990) Ltd., on 21 July 2016 for a reported £45 million from previous owner Steve Morgan and his company Bridgemere Group. In the last published accounts of Wolves' group parent company (covering the 2018–19 Premier League season), a pre-tax profit of just under £20 million was recorded, with turnover for the year equalling £172.5m. £92.1 million was spent on staff wages and costs.

Like most football clubs, significant commercial income is generated from shirt sponsorship deals. Past shirt sponsorship deals were as follows: Tatung (1982–86), Benjamin Perry (1986), Staw Distribution (1986–88), Manders Paint & Ink (1988–90), Goodyear (1990–2002), Doritos (2002–04), Chaucer Consulting (2004–09), Sportingbet (2009–13), What House? (2013–15), Silverbug (2015–16), The Money Shop (2016–18), W88 (2018–19). ManBetX (2019–2022), AstroPay (2022–2024) and DEBET (2024-).

Fosun bought Wolves from Steve Morgan, who had taken ownership in August 2007 for a nominal sum of £10 with the proviso that £30 million was injected into the club, ending an almost four-year search for a new buyer. Morgan oversaw nine full seasons, but placed the club on the market for new owners in September 2015. Morgan had bought the club from Sir Jack Hayward, a lifelong fan of the club, who had himself purchased it in 1990 for £2.1 million. During his tenure Sir Jack invested an estimated £50 million of his personal wealth to rebuild the club's stadium and fund new players, but the team only achieved one season in the top flight during his 17 years at the helm despite this increased spending power.

Hayward's takeover greatly improved the club's financial health, after a turbulent 1980s in which the club twice was declared bankrupt. In 1982 the club was "saved" from liquidation when it was purchased by two Saudi brothers, Mahmud and Mohammad Bhatti, as part of their company Allied Properties. However, their failure to sufficiently invest in the club saw it face several winding-up orders as well as successive relegations through the football divisions. In 1986 the official receiver was again called in and a deal eventually brokered for Wolverhampton City Council to purchase the club's stadium for £1.12 million, along with the surrounding land, while a local developer, Gallagher Estates, in conjunction with the Asda supermarket chain, agreed to pay off the club's outstanding debts in return for the building of an Asda superstore on land adjacent to the stadium.

== Honours ==
In the all-time table since the league's inception in 1888, Wolves sit fourth in terms of points gathered in all divisions (as of the conclusion of the 2018–19 season), with only Manchester United, Liverpool and Arsenal having accumulated more points in total. Wolves were the first side to win all four divisions of the English professional game and have won every competition currently contested in English domestic football.

League

- First Division (level 1)
  - Champions: 1953–54, 1957–58, 1958–59
  - Runners-up: 1937–38, 1938–39, 1949–50, 1954–55, 1959–60
- Second Division / First Division / Championship (level 2)
  - Champions: 1931–32, 1976–77, 2008–09, 2017–18
  - Runners-up: 1966–67, 1982–83
  - Play-off winners: 2003
- Third Division North / Third Division / League One (level 3)
  - Champions: 1923–24, 1988–89, 2013–14
- Fourth Division (level 4)
  - Champions: 1987–88

Cup

- FA Cup
  - Winners: 1892–93, 1907–08, 1948–49, 1959–60
  - Runners-up: 1888–89, 1895–96, 1920–21, 1938–39
- Football League Cup
  - Winners: 1973–74, 1979–80
- FA Charity Shield
  - Winners: 1949*, 1954*, 1959, 1960* (* shared)
- Associate Members' Cup
  - Winners: 1987–88
- Football League War Cup
  - Winners: 1942
- UEFA Cup
  - Runners-up: 1971–72
- Texaco Cup
  - Winners: 1970–71

== Records and statistics ==
=== Individual records ===
Derek Parkin holds the record for the most first-team appearances, with 609 (501 of which were league appearances). Highest goalscorer was Steve Bull with 306 (including 250 league goals - including a record 52 in one season). Billy Wright was Wolves' most capped international, winning 105 England caps while with the club. Signed in August 2022 for £38 million, Matheus Nunes became Wolves' most expensive signing, and became Wolves' record transfer when sold for £53 million to Manchester City in September 2023.

=== Team records ===
- Record win: 14–0 vs Crosswell's Brewery, FA Cup 2nd round, 13 November 1886
- Record defeat: 1–10 vs Newton Heath, Division 1, 15 October 1892
- Most league goals scored in a season: 115 (Division 2; 1931–32)
- Highest home attendance: 61,315 vs Liverpool, FA Cup 4th Round, 11 February 1939

== League history ==
Wolverhampton Wanderers was a founder member of the Football League in 1888. The 2025–26 season is Wolves' 127th in the Football League system. Wolves have spent 120 of their 126 completed seasons to date within the top two tiers of English football. Wolves played in the third tier on four occasions, each occasion lasting just one season; three of these seasons ended with promotion back to the second tier as Champions, and one ended in relegation to the fourth tier. The club has played two seasons in England's fourth tier (in the 1980s).

1888–1906 Division 1; 1906–1923 Division 2; 1923–1924 Division 3 North; 1924–1932 Division 2; 1932–1965 Division 1; 1965–1967 Division 2	1967–1976 Division 1; 1976–1977 Division 2; 1977–1982 Division 1; 1982–1983 Division 2; 1983–1984 Division 1; 1984–1985 Division 2	1985–1986 Division 3; 1986–1988 Division 4; 1988–1989 Division 3; 1989–2003 Division 2/Division 1 (Tier 2); 2003–2004 Premier League; 2004–2009 Championship	2009–2012 Premier League; 2012–2013 Championship; 2013–2014 League One; 2014–2018 Championship; 2018–2026 Premier League; 2026– Championship

- Seasons spent at Tier 1 of the football league system: 71 (incl. 2025–26)
- Seasons spent at Tier 2 of the football league system: 50
- Seasons spent at Tier 3 of the football league system: 4
- Seasons spent at Tier 4 of the football league system: 2

- Longest continuous run of seasons spent in Tier 1: 26 (1932–1965; league football suspended 1939-46 due to World War II)
- Longest continuous run of seasons spent in Tier 2: 14 (1989–2003)
- Longest continuous run of seasons spent in Tier 3: 1 (1923–24; 1985–86; 1988–89; 2013–14)
- Longest continuous run of seasons spent in Tier 4: 2 (1986–1988)
