= Fosun Pharma =

Chinese pharmaceutical company

Shanghai Fosun Pharmaceutical (Group) Co., Ltd.
- Formerly: Shanghai Fortune Industrial; Shanghai Fosun Industrial
- Type: Listed
Traded as
- SSE: 600196	(A share)
  SEHK: 2196	(H share)
- SSE MidCap Component
- Industry: Pharmaceutical; Medical
- Founded: 1994
- Founder: Fosun High Technology; Guangxin Technology; and 3 others
- Headquarters: Shanghai, China
Key people
Chen Qiyu	(chairman)
Wu Yifang	(CEO)
- Services: Private hospitals
- Net income: ▲CN¥3.125 billion (2017)
- Total assets: ▲CN¥61.914 billion (2017)
- Total equity: ▲CN¥25.270 billion (2017)
- Owner: Fosun Int'l (37.94%)
Subsidiaries
Sinopharm Industrial Investment	(joint venture, 49%)
Sisram Medical	(52.83%)
Gland Pharma	(12%)
Fosun Long March	(100%)
Fosun Industrial	(100%)

Chinese name
- Simplified Chinese: 上海复星医药（集团）股份有限公司
- Traditional Chinese: 上海復星醫藥（集團）股份有限公司
Transcriptions
Standard Mandarin
- Hanyu Pinyin: Shàng hǎi fù xīng yī yào (jí tuán) gǔ fèn yǒu xiàn gōng sī

Chinese short name
- Simplified Chinese: 复星医药
- Traditional Chinese: 復星醫藥
Transcriptions
Standard Mandarin
- Hanyu Pinyin: fù xīng yī yào

former Chinese short name
- Simplified Chinese: 复星实业
- Traditional Chinese: 復星實業
Transcriptions
Standard Mandarin
- Hanyu Pinyin: Fù xīng shí yè
- Website: www.fosunpharma.com

Shanghai Fosun Pharmaceutical (Group) Co., Ltd. (trade name: Fosun Pharma) is a Chinese pharmaceutical company. It is mostly owned by Fosun International.

As of 2018, the A shares of the company is a constituent of SSE 180 Index as well as its sub-index SSE MidCap Index. The company was ranked 1,840th in 2020 edition of the Forbes Global 2000, a list of top listed companies of the world.

== Key people ==
- Wu Yifang is the president and CEO of Fosun Pharma.
- Chen Qiyu is co-CEO of Fosun International and Chairman of Fosun Pharma.

== History ==
Fosun Pharmaceutical is a listed company which started A share initial public offering in 1998 and H share in 2012. The English name of the company was initially known as Shanghai Fortune Industrial Joint-Stock Co., Ltd. (SFIC; Chinese: 上海复星实业股份有限公司), but the transliteration of 复星 was later changed from Fortune to Fosun (as Fosun Industrial), as well as changing the name from Industrial (Chinese: 实业) to Pharmaceutical (Chinese: 医药). The company also shorten the transliteration of the legal suffix 股份有限公司 from Joint-Stock Co., Ltd. to just Co., Ltd..

Shanghai Fortune Industrial Joint-Stock Co., Ltd. was incorporated in 1998, but its predecessor, Shanghai Fortune Industrial Company (Chinese: 上海复星实业公司) was incorporated in January 1994. The majority shareholders in December 1994 were Fosun High Technology (Chinese: 复星高科技) and its parent company Guangxin Technology (Chinese: 广信科技); Guangxin Technology was owned by Guo Guangchang, Liang Xinjun, Wang Qunbin and Fan Wei.

In 2003 Fosun Pharmaceutical acquired 49% stake of Sinopharm Group (Chinese: 国药控股). (Note: Sinopharm Group was previously transliterated as Sinopharm Holding) In 2008, a year before the initial public offering of Sinopharm Group, Fosun Pharmaceutical owned the direct parent company of Sinopharm Group, Sinopharm Industrial Investment (Chinese: 国药产业投资) instead; the majority owner of the joint venture was state-owned China National Pharmaceutical Group (Sinopharm). (Note: China National Pharmaceutical Group itself was also transliterated as Sinopharm Group before the listing of its subsidiary, Sinopharm Group (formerly Sinopharm Holding).)

An intermediate parent company of Fosun Pharma, Fosun International (parent company of Fosun High Technology), became a listed company in 2007.

In 2014 Fosun Pharma was part of a consortium to acquire US-listed Chindex International, which owned private hospitals in mainland China.

In 2016, according to the Financial Times, Fosun Pharmaceutical made the largest Indian corporate takeover by a Chinese company. The parties have now reached agreement that Fosun Pharma will acquire an approximate 74% stake in Gland Pharma for no more than US$1,091.30 million, including paying no more than US$25 million contingent consideration for Gland Pharma's Enoxaparin sales in the U.S. market. Despite the offer was revised in 2017 to seek approval from Indian regulators. In October 2017, the acquisition of 74% stake of Gland Pharma was completed.

In September 2017, Israeli subsidiary Sisram Medical (parent company of Alma Lasers) was spin-off as a separate listed company on the Stock Exchange of Hong Kong. As of 31 December 2017, Fosun Pharma owned Sisram Medical 52.83% shares.

In October 2017 Fosun Pharmaceutical, via subsidiaries Fosun Pharmaceutical A.G. and Fosun Industrial (Note: Despite it is a namesake of the former name of Fosun Pharmaceutical, Fosun Industrial (simplified Chinese: 复星实业（香港）有限公司; traditional Chinese: 復星實業（香港）有限公司) was incorporated in Hong Kong.) bought Tridem Pharma, according to the Financial Times, "an Africa-focused French drug distributor", for not more than €63 million. In January 2021, the company entered into a partnership with Insilico Medicine, to facilitate the latter's entry into the Chinese market.

=== COVID-19 ===
Initial Responses

The company developed 2019-nCoV nucleic acid detection kit (PCR) which received emergency use authorization (EUA) from the FDA, was approved by the NMPA, and received CE certification from the European Union, as an in vitro diagnostic reagent. By August 2020 Fosun Pharma donated medical masks, protective clothing, medical non-invasive ventilators, negative pressure ambulances, and other equipment and supplies valued at more than RMB 30 million to the epidemic area.

COVID-19 Vaccine – BNT162b2

On 17 March 2020, BioNTech received a $135 million investment from Fosun in exchange for 1.58 million shares in BioNTech and the future development and marketing rights of the mRNA vaccine BNT162b2 in China. Also, BioNTech announced a collaboration with Pfizer to scale-up manufacturing capacity to provide worldwide supply in response to the pandemic. BioNTech and Pfizer would commercialize the vaccine worldwide except in China, which was already covered by BioNTech's agreement with Fosun.

Initial Investment in BioNTech and Early Testing

On 5 August, Fosun and BioNTech announced an initial Phase 1 trial in China that enrolled 144 volunteers to evaluate the safety and immunogenicity of BNT162b1. On 4 November, Fosun announced it would stop further trials of BNT162b1, as results from trials in Germany, United States, and China all showed BNT162b2 to have a better safety profile. BNT162b2 had missed an opportunity window to get tested in China, as another vaccine Fosun had started trials of BNT162b1 before trials data showed BNT162b2 as being the safer vaccine. Fosun's Chief Medical Officer Hui Aimin said that he didn't regret testing BNT162b1 without waiting for all the data. "For ordinary vaccines, it does not matter if you wait for a few days, or a month", Hui said. "But for COVID-19 vaccines, how many more people would have died had you waited just for one day?"

Regulation and Commercialization

Fosun said it would instead focus on seeking Chinese regulatory approval for BioNTech's other candidate BNT162b2 which was already in Phase III trials by Pfizer since July. Fosun would apply for a bridge study on BNT162b2, designed to test if the large trial data done overseas could be extrapolated to the populace of China.

In early August, Fosun and BioNTech signed an agreement with HKSE-listed Jacobson Pharma to supply 10 million doses of BNT162b2 to Hong Kong and Macau.

On 6 November, Fosun was hopeful BNT162b2 could be available in China as soon as it became available in the United States and Europe. On 20 November, Pfizer applied for emergency use approval from the Food and Drug Administration for BNT162b2.

== Shareholders ==
Fosun Pharmaceutical had two classes of ordinary share: A shares which only traded in mainland China as well as H share which only traded in Hong Kong.

As of 31 December 2017, there was 2,011,190,000 number of A shares and 483,941,000 number of H shares, for a total of 2,495,131,000, which Fosun International's wholly owned subsidiary, Fosun High Technology, owned 936,575,490 and 9,989,000 number of shares respectively.

Fosun High Technology also once owned 23.45% of the convertible bond (SSE:100196) of Fosun Pharma in 2003.

As of 31 December 2017, co-founder of Fosun High Technology and now co-owner of the parent company of Fosun International, Guo Guangchang and Wang Qunbin, still served as non-executive directors of Fosun Pharmaceutical. As of 31 July 2019, the market capitalization of the H share of Fosun Pharma was HK$12,943,004,725.
