= Foshan Fosun Chancheng Hospital =

- Fosun Health

Geography
- Location: Chancheng District, Foshan, Guangdong, China

Organisation
- Care system: Private
- Type: General

Services
- Standards: Grade III Class A
- Beds: 1,750

History
- Founded: 1958

Links
- Website: www.fsccyy.com
- Lists: Hospitals in China

Foshan Fosun Chancheng Hospital (Chinese: 佛山复星禅诚医院), is a private general hospital in Foshan, Guangdong, China. Established in 1958, it is a Grade III Class A hospital and is part of Fosun Health's hospital network.

== History ==
The hospital was established in 1958.

In 2004, the hospital underwent a restructuring that changed its ownership and governance structure, followed by changes in its management and patient services.

In October 2013, Fosun Pharma agreed to acquire a 60% interest in the hospital for up to RMB 693 million. Fosun Pharma subsequently increased its ownership.

The hospital was renamed Foshan Fosun Chancheng Hospital in 2021.

== Medical services ==
Foshan Fosun Chancheng Hospital is a general hospital providing inpatient, outpatient, rehabilitation and other medical services. It has 1,750 approved beds.

In 2023, the hospital became a designated medical institution in Foshan under the Guangdong–Hong Kong–Macao Greater Bay Area programme allowing certain drugs and medical devices approved in Hong Kong and Macao to be used at designated healthcare institutions in Guangdong.

In March 2026, the hospital opened a 100-bed international medical center as one of the first medical institutions selected for Guangdong's international medical service pilot programme. The center provides outpatient, inpatient, examination and rehabilitation services.
