= Fan Wei =

Fan Wei is the name of:

- Fan Wei (actor) (born 1962), Chinese actor
- Fan Wei (entrepreneur), Chinese entrepreneur, founder of Fosun International
