= Fosun Health =

Chinese healthcare services company

- Native name: 上海复星健康科技（集团）有限公司
- Type: Subsidiary
- Industry: Healthcare
- Founded: 2010
- Headquarters: Shanghai, China
- Area served: Mainland China, Hong Kong, Macau and some overseas markets
- Products: Hospital operations, specialized medical care, rehabilitation medicine, health management, cross-border medical services
- Parent: Shanghai Fosun Pharmaceutical (Group) Co., Ltd.
- Website: www.fosunhealth.com/en/

Fosun Health (Chinese: 上海复星健康科技（集团）有限公司) is a Chinese healthcare company headquartered in Shanghai. Established in 2010, it is a subsidiary of Shanghai Fosun Pharmaceutical (Group) Co., Ltd. The company operates hospitals, clinics and diagnostic centres in China and provides cross-border medical services to patients from other Asian markets.

As of 2025, Fosun Health operated 19 hospitals, clinics and third-party diagnostic centres in mainland China. Its principal medical institutions include Foshan Fosun Chancheng Hospital, Guangzhou Fosun Chancheng Hospital, Shenzhen Hengsheng Hospital, Zhuhai Chancheng Hospital, Shanghai Shiguang Plastic Surgery Hospital, Shanghai Xingchen Children's Hospital, Shanghai Zhuoerhui Clinic and Beijing Zhuoerhui Clinic.

== History ==
Fosun Health was established in Shanghai in 2010 as Fosun Pharma's healthcare services business.

In May 2021, Shanghai Fosun Medical Group was renamed Shanghai Fosun Health Technology (Group) Co., Ltd.

In December 2023, Bloomberg reported that Fosun Pharma was considering raising about RMB 1 billion (US$141 million) for Fosun Health and was weighing a potential initial public offering of the hospital business.

In May 2024, Fosun Health raised RMB 300 million from an investment company controlled by the government of Chancheng District in Foshan. The transaction valued Fosun Health at RMB 10.2 billion, and the company committed to pursuing a public listing within five years as part of the investment agreement.

In February 2026, Fosun Health announced plans to establish its first overseas hospitals in Indonesia.

== International collaboration ==
Fosun Health has expanded its international healthcare network through cross-border medical cooperation, academic exchanges, teleconsultation and partnerships with overseas healthcare institutions.

In January 2026, medical teams from Fosun Health-affiliated hospitals visited Bangladesh for medical consultations and professional exchanges.

In February 2026, Fosun Health announced plans to establish its first overseas hospitals in Indonesia.

In September 2026, Fosun Health hosted the first International Oncology Treatment Forum in Foshan, Guangdong. During the forum, Fosun Health launched the Global Oncology Collaboration Alliance and announced cooperation with healthcare institutions in Vietnam, Indonesia, Bangladesh and Central Asia.

== Financial performance ==
Fosun Health reported revenue of RMB 6.3 billion in 2023, an increase of 2.8% from the previous year, while recording a net loss of RMB 420 million. The company had recorded losses for three consecutive years during the COVID-19 pandemic, compared with a net profit of RMB 1.5 billion in 2019.

== Rankings and awards ==
In the 2025 edition of the China Hospital Competitiveness Report, Fosun Health ranked second among privately operated hospital groups in China.

In 2026, Fosun Health received the "Oncology Service Provider of the Year in Asia-Pacific" award at the GlobalHealth Asia-Pacific Awards.
