= List of owners of Italian football clubs =

The following is a list of all owners with a significant interest (a stake above 10%) within Italian football clubs, including their estimated net worth and sources of wealth. The list is updated as of the 2025–26 season.

== Serie A ==
Club	Owner(s)	Estimated net worth (2025)	Source of wealth
Atalanta	(United States) Stephen Pagliuca (55%) (Italy) Antonio Percassi (45%)	$450M $1.3B	Private equity Real estate, fashion
Bologna	(Canada) Joey Saputo (through Saputo Inc., 99.93%)	$6.0B	Dairy
Cagliari	(Italy) Tommaso Giulini (through Fluorsid, 100%)	$164M	Chemical
Como	(Indonesia) Djarum (through SENT Entertainment)	$40B	Conglomerate
Cremonese	(Italy) Giovanni Arvedi	$1.9B	Steel manufacturing
Fiorentina	(Italy) (United States) Rocco B. Commisso (97%)	$5.9B	Telecommunications
Genoa	(Romania) Dan Șucu (77%)	$300M	Retail and furniture
Hellas Verona	(United States) Presidio Investors (100%)	$778M	Private equity
Inter Milan	(United States) Oaktree Capital Management (99.6%)	$205B	Global asset management
Juventus	(Italy) Agnelli family (through Exor, 63.77%)	$2.8B	Conglomerate
Lazio	(Italy) Claudio Lotito (66.70%)		Sports management
Lecce	(Italy) Saverio Sticchi Damiani (54.60%)		Corporate law
AC Milan	(United States) Gerry Cardinale (through RedBird Capital, 99%)	$10B	Private equity, sports, media
Napoli	(Italy) Aurelio De Laurentiis (through Filmauro, 100%)	$200M	Film, entertainment
Parma	(United States) Kyle J. Krause (through Krause Group)	$2.8B (as of 2018)	Retail, real estate
Pisa	(United States) Alexander Knaster (75%)	$1.3B (as of 2022)	Finance
Roma	(United States) Dan Friedkin (through The Friedkin Group, 100%)	$9.5B	Automotive, investments
Sassuolo	(Italy) Squinzi family (through Mapei, 100%)	$3.6B	Construction, chemicals
Torino	(Italy) Urbano Cairo (through Cairo Communication, 100%)	$591M	Media, broadcasting
Udinese	(Italy) Pozzo family (through Gesapar Holding, 100%)		Industrial manufacturing, football

== Serie B ==
Club	Owner(s)	Estimated net worth (2025)	Source of wealth
Bari	(Italy) Aurelio De Laurentiis (through Filmauro, 100%)	$216M (as of 2023)	Film
Brescia	(Italy) Massimo Cellino (through Gruppo IVPC)		Wind power
Catanzaro	(Italy) AZ S.p.A.		Machinery
Cittadella	(Italy) Andrea Gabrielli (through Gabrielli)		Steel
Cosenza	(Italy) Eugenio Guarascio		Business
Empoli	(Italy) Fabrizio Corsi (through CG Studio, 48.90%)		Entertainment, media
Frosinone	(Italy) Maurizio Stirpe (through Together, 100%)		Real estate
Modena	(Italy) Carlo Rivetti (through Rivetex)		Textile
Monza	(United States) Beckett Layne Ventures (80%)		Finance, investment
Palermo	(United Kingdom) City Football Group (94.94%)	$16.8B (as of 2021) (Note: While the personal wealth of Mansour bin Zayed Al Nahyan is used here, Palermo are controlled by Abu Dhabi United Group, which internal documents suggest is ultimately managed by the government of the United Arab Emirates. Therefore, as Palermo are controlled by companies considered state-controlled, the concept of 'net worth' is purposeless and does not apply. The actual value of the controlling entities are ultimately impossible to even guess at. The figures included are simply included as a reference point, and should therefore be taken at face value at best.)	Multi-club ownership
Reggiana	(Italy) Carmelo Salerno		
Salernitana	(Italy) Danilo Iervolino (through IDI, 100%)	$1.2B	Education tech
Sampdoria	(Italy) Matteo Manfredi (through Blucerchiati SpA)		
Spezia	(United States) Robert Platek		
Südtirol	(Italy) Gerhard Comper		
Venezia	(United States) Duncan L. Niederauer (through VFC Newco 2020 LLC)	$1.3B (as of 2021)	

== See also ==
- List of owners of English football clubs
