= Fidelidade =

Portuguese insurance company

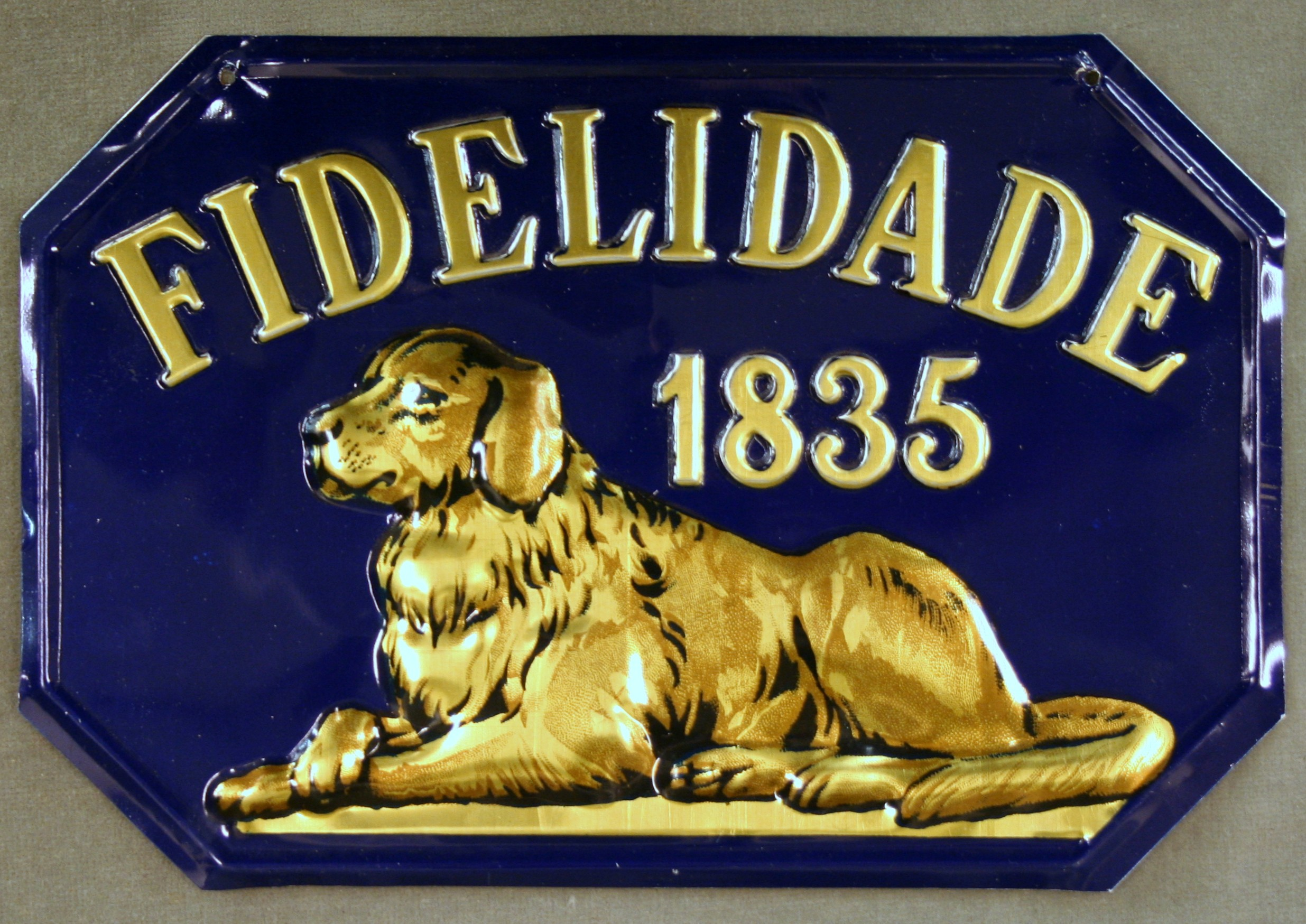
- Fire mark for Companhia de Seguros Fidelidade in Lisbon

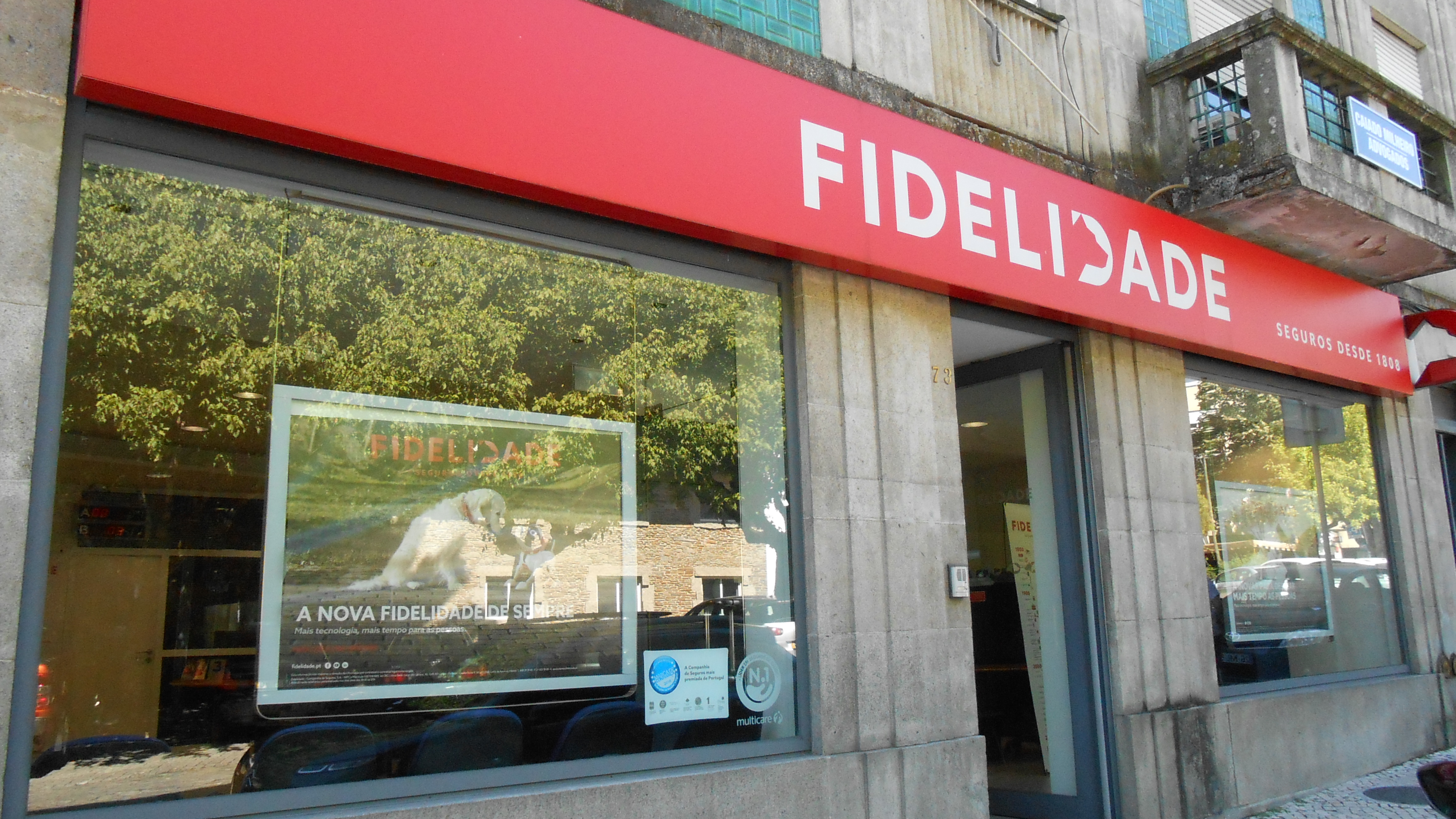
- Fidelidade office in Viseu
- Company type: Private company
- Industry: Insurance
- Predecessor: Bonança and Companhia de Seguros Fidelidade
- Founded: 1808; 218 years ago
- Headquarters: Lisbon, Portugal
- Area served: Portugal
- Products: Life insurance and general insurance
- Owner: Fosun International
- Number of employees: 5,700 (2022)
- Website: www.fidelidade.pt

Fidelidade is a Portuguese insurance company that was established in the early 19th century and is headquartered in Lisbon. It is a subsidiary of Fosun International. Portuguese leader in the domestic market, the company focuses on providing life and non-life products for both individuals and companies.

The insurer has adopted a multi-channel strategy in the distribution of its products. Besides Portugal, it has an international network present in Cape Verde, Angola, France, Mozambique, Macau, and Spain.

== History ==
The history of the company dates back to 1808 with the foundation of Bonança. In 1835 Companhia de Seguros Fidelidade is founded. Over the centuries, there have been several moments that have marked the activity of the companies that are at its origin: mergers, nationalization and later privatization, expansion into new markets, and adoption of new strategies.

The name Fidelidade Mundial thus results from the merger in 2002 of the insurance companies Fidelidade and Mundial Confiança. This was followed in 2012 by the merger of Fidelidade Mundial and Império Bonança, giving rise to Fidelidade - Companhia de Seguros, S.A..

In 2011, Fidelidade started its activity in Angola by purchasing the majority share of Universal Seguros, SA. It rebranded the company to Fidelidade Angola in 2017.

In 2014, the Chinese conglomerate Fosun International was chosen by the Portuguese state to buy Fidelidade which was by then an asset of Caixa Geral de Depósitos, a Portuguese state-run bank.

== Shareholders ==
As of 2021, the share ownership structure of Fidelidade is:

- Fosun International: 84.9892%
- Caixa Geral de Depósitos: 15%

== See also ==
- Pavilhão Fidelidade
