= Sinopharm Group =

Chinese biotechnology company

- logo of Sinopharm Group (same as China National Pharmaceutical Group), with bilingual name on the right
- Type: public
Traded as
unlisted	(A share)
SEHK: 1099	(H share)
- ISIN: CNE100000FN7
- Industry: Pharmaceutical
- Founded: 1998 (predecessor); 2003
- Founder: China National Pharmaceutical Group
- Headquarters: Sinopharm Plaza, Shanghai, China
- Area served: China
- Key people: Wei Yulin (Chairman); Chen Qiyu (Vice-Chairman); Li Zhiming (President)
- Revenue: ▲CN¥227.069 billion (2015)
- Operating income: ▲CN¥9.169 billion (2015)
- Net income: ▲CN¥3.761 billion (2015)
- Total assets: ▲CN¥138.267 billion (2015)
- Total equity: ▲CN¥30.052 billion (2015)
- Owner: Sinopharm Industrial Investment (56.79%)
- Parent: Sinopharm Industrial Investment
- Subsidiaries: Sinopharm CNMC
- Footnotes in a consolidated basis; equity and profit excluded minority interests; in Hong Kong Financial Reporting Standards

Sinopharm Group Co., Ltd.
- Simplified Chinese: 国药控股股份有限公司
- Traditional Chinese: 國藥控股股份有限公司
- Literal meaning: Sinopharm Holding Joint-Stock Limited Company
Transcriptions

Sinopharm Group
- Simplified Chinese: 国药控股
- Traditional Chinese: 國藥控股
- Literal meaning: Sinopharm Holding
Transcriptions

Second alternative Chinese name
- Simplified Chinese: 国控股份有限公司
- Traditional Chinese: 國控股份有限公司
Transcriptions

Sinopharm Group Co., Ltd. is a Chinese pharmaceutical company. The parent company of Sinopharm Group was Sinopharm Industrial Investment, a 51–49 joint venture of state-owned enterprise China National Pharmaceutical Group and civilian-run enterprise Fosun Pharmaceutical.

Its H shares were listed on the Hong Kong Stock Exchange in 2009, with its IPO price of HK$16 per share. Sinopharm Group's subsidiary Sinopharm CNMC and Sinopharm Accord served as the A share counterpart of the company. However, the A share of Sinopharm Group itself was unlisted.

Sinopharm Group was ranked 829th in 2016 Forbes Global 2000 list.

== COVID-19 Vaccine development ==
The Sinopharm BIBP COVID-19 vaccine, also known as BBIBP-CorV, the Sinopharm COVID-19 vaccine, or BIBP vaccine, is one of two inactivated virus COVID-19 vaccines developed by Sinopharm. It completed Phase III trials in Argentina, Bahrain, Egypt, Morocco, Pakistan, Peru, and the United Arab Emirates (UAE) with over 60,000 participants. The BIBP vaccine shares similar technology with CoronaVac and Covaxin, other inactivated virus vaccines for COVID-19.

Peer-reviewed results published in JAMA of Phase III trials in United Arab Emirates and Bahrain showed that the BIBP vaccine is 78.1% effective against symptomatic cases and 100% against severe cases (21 cases in vaccinated group vs. 95 cases in placebo group). In December 2020, the UAE previously announced interim results showing 86% efficacy. While mRNA vaccines showed higher efficacy of over 90%, those present distribution challenges for some nations as they require deep-freeze facilities and trucks. BIBP-CorV could be transported and stored at normal refrigerated temperatures.

The BIBP vaccine is being used in vaccination campaigns by certain countries in Asia, Africa, South America, and Europe. Sinopharm was expected to produce one billion doses of the BIBP vaccine in 2021. On 7 May 2021, the World Health Organization approved the vaccine for use in COVAX.

== See also ==
- Pharmaceutical industry in China
