= Sinopharm (company) =

Chinese state-owned enterprise

Coordinates: 39.9747°N 116.3401°E

China National Pharmaceutical Group Corporation

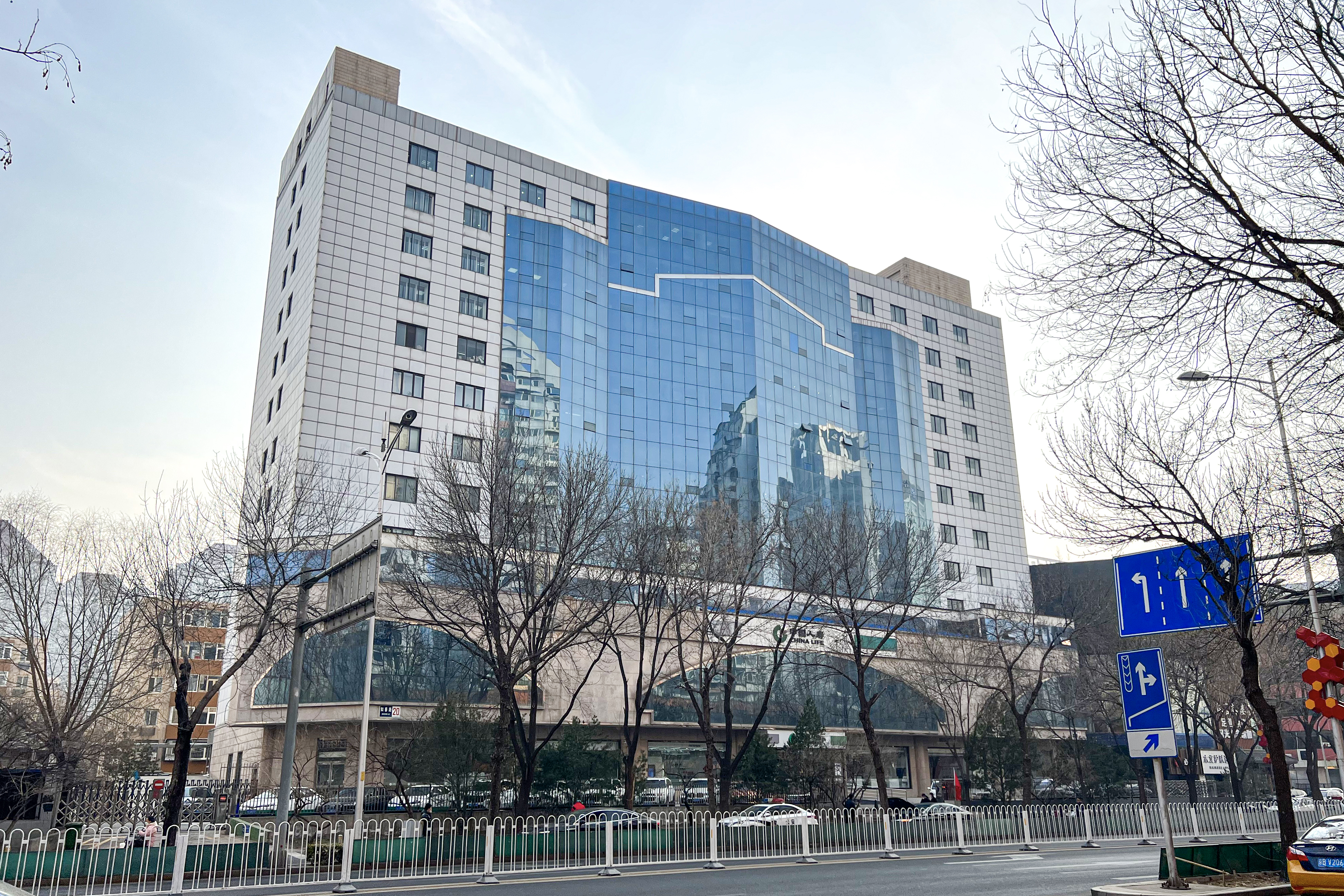
- Headquarters
- Trade name: Sinopharm
- Company type: State-owned enterprise
- Industry: Pharmaceutical; Biotechnology
- Founded: November 26, 1998; 27 years ago
- Headquarters: 20 Zhichun Road, Haidian District, Beijing, China
- Area served: China, exported worldwide
- Key people: Liu Jingzhen (chairman & Chinese Communist Party Committee Secretary)
- Products: Pharmaceutical drugs; vaccines
- Revenue: ▲US$ 96.1 billion (2023)
- Net income: ▲US$ 1.1 billion (2023)
- Total assets: US$ 82.8 billion (2023)
- Owner: Chinese central government (100%)
- Number of employees: 202,426 (2023)
- Subsidiaries: Sinopharm Industrial Investment (51%); → Sinopharm Group (56.79%); Trad. Chinese Medicine (37.59%); Shyndec Pharma. (41.62%); China National Biotec Group (95%); → Tiantan Biological (53.30%)

Chinese name
- Simplified Chinese: 中国医药集团总公司
- Traditional Chinese: 中國醫藥集團總公司
Transcriptions
Standard Mandarin
- Hanyu Pinyin: Zhōngguó yīyào jítuán zǒng gōngsī

short Chinese name
- Simplified Chinese: 国药集团
- Traditional Chinese: 國藥集團
Transcriptions
Standard Mandarin
- Hanyu Pinyin: Guóyào jítuán
- Footnotes / references in a consolidated basis; equity and profit excluded minority interests; in Chinese Accounting Standards

China National Pharmaceutical Group Corporation (CNPGC), commonly referred to as Sinopharm, is a Chinese state-owned enterprise. The corporation was the indirect major shareholder of publicly traded companies Sinopharm Group (SEHK: 1099, via a 51–49 joint venture, Sinopharm Industrial Investment, with Fosun Pharmaceutical), China Traditional Chinese Medicine (SEHK: 570, mostly via Sinopharm Group Hongkong Co., Ltd.), Shanghai Shyndec Pharmaceutical (SSE: 600420, via a wholly owned research institute based in Shanghai), and Beijing Tiantan Biological Products (SSE: 600161, via China National Biotec Group).

China National Pharmaceutical Group was supervised by the State-owned Assets Supervision and Administration Commission of the State Council.

Sinopharm was ranked 109th in the 2021 Fortune Global 500 list.

== History ==
Sinopharm was founded as China National Pharmaceutical Group Corporation (Chinese: 中国医药集团总公司) on November 26, 1998, as a holding company for China National Pharmaceutical Corporation, China National Pharmaceutical Industry Corporation (Chinese: 中国医药工业公司), China National Pharmaceutical Foreign Trade Corp. (Chinese: 中国医药对外贸易公司) and China National Medical Device (Chinese: 中国医疗器械工业公司). In 2009 it was merged with China National Biotec Group (Chinese: 中国生物技术集团公司).

Its subsidiary Wuhan Institute of Biological Products was fined for selling 400,520 ineffective DPT vaccines in November 2017.

Pfizer announced the signing of a cooperation pact with Sinopharm Group in April 2023, with plans to seek approval for 12 drugs in China through 2025.

== COVID-19 vaccines ==
The Sinopharm BIBP COVID-19 vaccine, also known as BBIBP-CorV, the Sinopharm COVID-19 vaccine, or BIBP vaccine, is one of two inactivated virus COVID-19 vaccines developed by Sinopharm. It completed Phase III trials in Argentina, Bahrain, Egypt, Morocco, Pakistan, Peru, and the United Arab Emirates (UAE) with over 60,000 participants. BBIBP-CorV shares similar technology with CoronaVac and BBV152, other inactivated virus vaccines for COVID-19.

Peer-reviewed results published in JAMA of Phase III trials in United Arab Emirates and Bahrain showed BBIBP-CorV 78.1% effective against symptomatic cases and 100% against severe cases (21 cases in vaccinated group vs. 95 cases in placebo group). In December 2020, the UAE previously announced interim results showing 86% efficacy. While mRNA vaccines like the Pfizer–BioNTech COVID-19 vaccine and mRNA-1273 showed higher efficacy of over 90%, those present distribution challenges for some nations as they require deep-freeze facilities and trucks. BIBP-CorV could be transported and stored at normal refrigerated temperatures.

BBIBP-CorV is being used in vaccination campaigns by certain countries in Asia, Africa, South America, and Europe. Sinopharm expects to produce one billion doses of BBIBP-CorV in 2021. On 7 May 2021, the World Health Organization approved the vaccine for emergency use and Sinopharm later signed purchase agreements for 170 million doses from COVAX.

The similarly named Sinopharm WIBP COVID-19 vaccine is also an inactivated virus vaccine.

== See also ==
- CanSino Biologics
- Sinovac
