= Shenzhen Hengsheng Hospital =

Geography
- Location: Bao'an District, Shenzhen, Guangdong, China

Organisation
- Care system: Private
- Type: General hospital
- Affiliated university: Fosun Health

History
- Founded: 2004

Links
- Website: www.hsyy.com.cn
- Lists: Hospitals in China

Shenzhen Hengsheng Hospital (Chinese: 深圳恒生医院) is a tertiary general hospital in Bao'an District, Shenzhen, Guangdong, China.

== History ==
Shenzhen Hengsheng Hospital was founded in 2004. The hospital then had a construction area of nearly 95,000 square metres, more than 40 clinical and medical-technical departments, 681 approved beds and more than 800 professional, technical and administrative staff.

In November 2017, Fosun Health announced an agreement to acquire a 60% equity interest in the hospital for RMB 909 million.

== Medical services ==
The hospital provides general medical and surgical services and has departments in areas including internal medicine, surgery, reproductive medicine, rehabilitation and other clinical specialties.

In 2023, the hospital established an international medical center, which provides services to overseas patients and patients from Hong Kong and Macau.

In October 2024, the hospital established an International Minimally Invasive Interventional Center.
