= Shanghai Forte Land =

Chinese real estate company

Shanghai Forte Land 上海复地
- Type: Privately held company
- Industry: Real estate
- Founded: 1994
- Founder: Guo Guangchang
- Headquarters: Shanghai, People's Republic of China
- Area served: People's Republic of China
- Key people: Chairman: Guo Guangchang
- Parent: Fosun International
- Website: Shanghai Forte Land

Shanghai Forte Land Company Limited (former stock codes: HKEX:2337), or Shanghai Forte Land and Forte Land, is one of the largest real estate developers in Shanghai, China. It is founded by Chinese billionaire Guo Guangchang in 1994 and it is headquartered in Shanghai. It has developed several dozens of real estate projects in major cities such as Shanghai, Beijing, Wuhan, Nanjing, Wuxi, Chongqing, Tianjin, Haikou and Hangzhou.

Forte's H shares were listed on the Hong Kong Stock Exchange in 2004. It was planned to issue A shares in the Shanghai Stock Exchange in 2008. Forte was acquired and privatized by Fosun International in May 2011.

== See also ==
- Real estate in China
