= The Bund Finance Center =

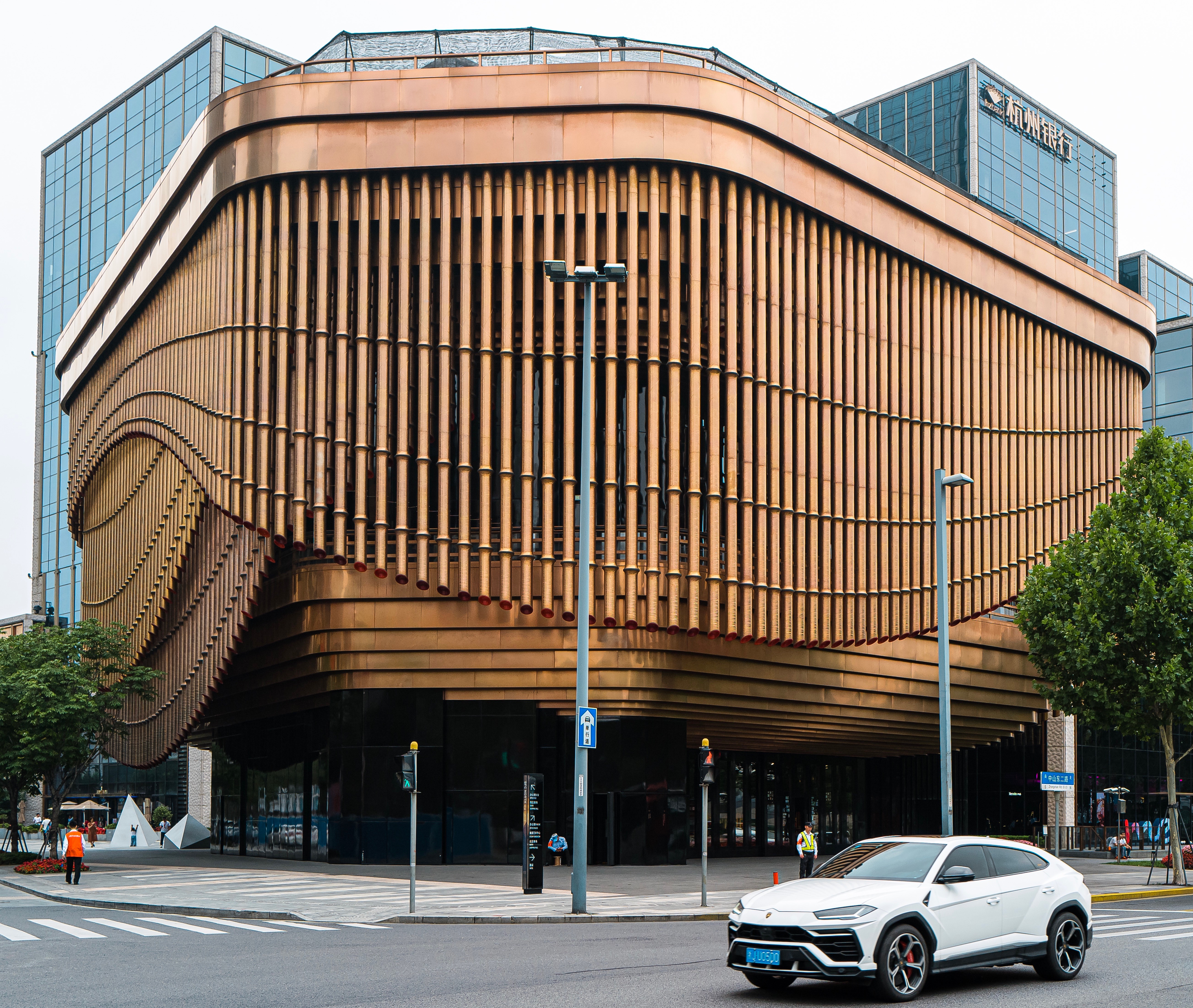
- Interactive map of the The Bund Finance Center area

General information
- Type: Cultural centre
- Location: The Bund, Shanghai, China
- Coordinates: 31°13′43.92″N 121°29′36.64″E
- Inaugurated: 2017

Technical details
- Floor count: 4 (above ground) 3 (below ground)
- Floor area: 4,000 m^{2} (43,000 sq ft)

Design and construction
- Architects: Thomas Heatherwick; Norman Foster
- Architecture firm: Heatherwick Studio

Website
- www.fosunfoundation.com/en/index.php/venue/fosun_foundation_center

The Bund Finance Center is a building located in the Old City area of Shanghai, China. It is notable for its three, overlapping, moving layers of vertical stainless steel pipes. These layers, inspired by theatre curtains, slowly rotate around the building. Fosun Foundation (Shanghai), a non-profit organization is based in the building and was supported by Fosun Group and Fosun Foundation. The building is located in the narrow strip of riverfront land between the eastern wall of the Old City and the Huangpu River, a locality traditionally called "Shiliupu" (十六铺, "the Sixteenth Stall").

The building is home to the art museum Fosun Foundation Shanghai (formerly the Fosun Art Center).

== Description ==
The total area is 4,000 square feet. It comprises four above-ground floors and three below.

=== Exterior ===
The exterior is veiled with three moving layers, or curtains, of vertical, gold/bronze-coloured, stainless steel pipes. These hang from the third floor and move along tracks powered by electric motors. Each day, for several hours, these layers slowly rotate around the building to music.

Inspired by traditional Chinese theatre curtains, these layers resemble not only curtains, but also a Western harp and an ancient Chinese crown. The gold finish on the draped pipes and exterior is achieved through a process of Physical Vapour Deposition, or PVD, on stainless steel producing a vibrant gold colour.

=== Interior ===
The first floor contains a lobby, atrium, and cafe. It has a ceiling height of 4 metres, is 24 metres long and 15.6 metres wide, for a total area of 360 square metres.

The second and third floors each have a ceiling height of 6.5 metres, is 31 metres long and 16.4 metres wide, for a combined area of 1,140 square metres.

The fourth floor has an area of 600 square metres.

There are 3 below-ground levels containing auditoriums and a number of hallways that will connect to the adjacent complex.

== Creators ==
The building was designed by Foster + Partners and creative director Thomas Heatherwick of Heatherwick Studio.

== Purpose ==
The Fosun Foundation will be used to host a various of events including fashion shows, art exhibitions, and conferences.
