= Steve Morgan (businessman) =

English businessman, investor, and philanthropist

Steve Morgan CBE
- Born: Stephen Peter Morgan; 25 November 1952 (age 73); Liverpool, England
- Occupations: Entrepreneur & Philanthropist
- Years active: 1974–present
- Spouse(s): Pamela Morgan (m. 1973; div. 2000) Fiona Boustead (m. 2002; div. 2013) Sally Toumi (m. 2016)
- Children: 6

Stephen Peter Morgan CBE (born 25 November 1952) is an English businessman, investor, and philanthropist. He is the founder and former chairman of the housebuilders Redrow plc, a former chairman of Wolverhampton Wanderers F.C., and founder of the charitable Steve Morgan Foundation.

== Early life ==
Morgan was born in Garston, Liverpool, on 25 November 1952. The son of a plant hire operator, he came from a poor background with what he, in November 2021, called a “tough upbringing”, telling The High Performance Podcast that it was only at the age of seven that he knew what an inside toilet was. He moved home nine times during his childhood and consequently changed school nine times. His parents moved to Colwyn Bay when he was 13, and he was educated at Colwyn High School and Liverpool Polytechnic (now Liverpool John Moores University), where he completed a two-year diploma course.

== Redrow ==
Morgan entered the business world, aged 21, during the 1974 recession. His then employers, Wellington Civil Engineering, were on the verge of going out of business. Wellington was offered a new job laying sewers in Penley and Morgan offered to take it over. After Margaret Thatcher’s reduction in public spending put an end to this work, he went on to develop this company into the housebuilder Redrow plc. Under his chairmanship, Redrow was floated on the London Stock Exchange in 1994, ultimately becoming a FTSE 250 Company.

The 1990s saw Morgan also invest in hotels, developing St David's Park Hotel in North Wales and Carden Park in Cheshire, eventually merging his interests into the De Vere Group.

In November 2000, after 26 years, Morgan stepped down as Redrow chairman, although his company, Bridgemere, remained one of its largest shareholders. In 2001 Morgan founded Brownfield specialist company Harrow Estates plc.

In March 2009, Morgan returned in order to address the significant losses suffered by the company during the financial crisis. By 2010, the situation had improved markedly with the housebuilder reporting a pre-tax profit of £700,000 (compared to a £44.2m loss in 2009).

After returning to Redrow, Morgan refocused the company's building projects on providing family homes by launching the New Heritage collection.

On 18 October 2018 Redrow announced its 100,000th customer since Morgan founded the business.

In March 2019, 10 years to the day that Morgan returned, he retired from Redrow. When he left the company, its annual revenue had increased to more than seven times its 2009 figure to £2.1 billion, profits were £406 million and it was valued at £2.2 billion.

== Wolverhampton Wanderers and other football investments ==
A shareholder and lifelong supporter of Liverpool football club, Morgan attempted several times to buy the club, most notably in 2004 when he made an offer to obtain a controlling share of 51% in return for a cash injection of £73 million. This was rejected, reportedly because it valued the club at £61 million, which the board felt was too low. In an interview in 2021 Morgan disputed the figure stating he had in fact valued the club at £140 million

In 2007, an opportunity arose to purchase Wolverhampton Wanderers, a club which he had previously regarded as his "second club". Morgan agreed to buy the club from Sir Jack Hayward for a token fee of £10 on condition he invested £30 million in the club. The takeover was formally completed on 9 August 2007 when Morgan became chairman. On handover, Hayward stated that Morgan had "had a heart transplant from Liverpool to Wolverhampton". In May 2009, Wolves were promoted, as champions, to the Premier League, but were relegated back to the Championship in May 2012 after three seasons. After suffering a second successive relegation in the 2012–13 season, Wolves played in League One in the 2013–14 season and finished as champions with a record 103 points, returning to the Championship. In October 2013, he was criticised for inviting former Merseyside Chief Constable Norman Bettison as his guest in the directors' box at a Wolves away match. Bettison is a controversial figure for his role in connection with the Hillsborough football disaster in 1989. Wolves responded on its official Twitter account, "The story is that Sir Norman Bettison attended the Bradford City game in the same way he has attended many Wolves games in the past. Steve Morgan and Sir Norman Bettison have known each other for many years. Everyone connected with the club has the utmost sympathy and respect for the victims of Hillsborough and their families." In 2014 Morgan oversaw the opening of the club's multi-million pound Compton Park training complex.

In July 2016, Morgan sold Wolves to the Chinese company Fosun International for £30 million. Morgan later revealed in an interview that he had turned down other offers but had accepted Fosun's bid because of the company's commitment to invest £100m into the club. Morgan signed off with an open letter to Wolves fans in which he described his time owning the club as "an honour and a privilege that I will never forget".

In June 2022, Morgan was linked with a bid to buy financially-troubled Derby County.

== Philanthropy ==
In 2001 he founded the Steve Morgan Foundation, to which he has donated over £300 million, and which has provided support to more than 650 charities to date and funding ongoing awards. In 2022, the Foundation made the biggest ever philanthropic donation to diabetes research in the UK, £50 million.

Following the outbreak of COVID-19 in early 2020, Morgan pledged £1 million a week to charities to help vulnerable members of society cope with the fallout of the virus. That support was credited as a lifeline for hundreds of charities affected by COVID-19 particularly food banks, support for the homeless, domestic abuse charities and mental health organisations. The Foundation reported in December 2020 that Morgan had given over £27 million to charities impacted by COVID-19.

His donations and beneficial projects have included:

- In February 2017, Morgan donated an estimated £207 million in shares to the Foundation.
- As part of its “Smiley Bus” scheme, the Foundation provides adapted minibuses to schools, charities and community groups supporting people with special mobility needs. As of April 2024, 100 such buses had been donated.
- Morgan was the instigator behind creating Wolverhampton's ‘The Way’ youth zone, donating £2 million to help fund the project, which seeks to positively impact over 4,000 young people in Wolverhampton a year. Morgan chaired The Way until stepping down in September 2016 after the sale of Wolves.
- In September 2017 Morgan donated $1m to the Barbuda Relief Fund which was set up to support relief efforts in the wake of Hurricane Irma.
- In February 2018 it was announced that the Foundation would work with Maggie's Centres to build two new cancer care centres; one at Clatterbridge Hospital on the Wirral and the other at the Royal Liverpool Hospital. The Wirral centre opened in September 2021. Subsequently, the Foundation committed to a third centre in North Wales.
- In September 2018, in an interview with the Sunday Times, he and his wife Sally revealed that they had donated £3 million to the Juvenile Diabetes Research Foundation (JDRF). JDRF has since benefited from further donations, including a £1 million donation in December 2019 and a share of the £20m received by charities following Morgan's agreement to match-fund a £10m award from the DCMS.
- In April 2021, Diabetes UK announced that the Steve Morgan Foundation had donated £50m to help find a cure for type 1 diabetes
- In 2022 the Steve Morgan Foundation partnered with airline Wizz Air and three other not-for-profit organisations Choose Love, The Shapiro Foundation and the Ukraine Sponsorship Pathway UK (USPUK) in order to offer 10,000 free flights to the United Kingdom to Ukrainian refugees.

== Honours ==
In 1992, Morgan was appointed Officer of the Order of the British Empire (OBE) for services to the construction industry.

He is a fellow of the Institute of Builders, and holds honorary fellowships and doctorates at Cardiff University, Liverpool John Moores University, Glyndŵr University., Wolverhampton University, and University of Chester. In 2025 he received an honorary degree from the University of Liverpool.

Morgan was appointed Commander of the Order of the British Empire (CBE) in the 2016 Birthday Honours for philanthropic services.

== Personal life ==
Morgan and his first wife Pamela divorced in 2000. They have two children together, Ross and Lindsey. Morgan also has a son with Janet Hill, Mark Hill. In 2002, Morgan married his second wife, Fiona Boustead with whom he has a daughter, Goldie and son, Red. They divorced in 2013. In 2016, he married businesswoman Sally Toumi, with whom he has a stepson Hugo.

Morgan owns a second home on the Caribbean island of Antigua. The 2024 Sunday Times Rich List estimated his net worth at £915 million.

In February 2019, Morgan received an apology and damages from the Daily Mail after being falsely accused of buying Redrow properties at an undervalue. He commented, having brought a libel claim at the High Court in London, "It is a shame that it has taken 18 months for justice to be served and for the Daily Mail to recognise its wrongdoing, however, I am pleased the record has now been set straight and that we may now draw a line under this issue." The damages were paid towards adapted minibuses for two special needs schools.
