= Fan Wei (entrepreneur) =

Chinese businessman and investor

- Born: China
- Education: Fudan University
- Occupation: Businessman
- Known for: Co-founder of Fosun

Fan Wei (Chinese: 范伟) is a Chinese billionaire businessman and investor. He was one of the founder of Hong Kong incorporated public company Fosun International; he also founded its predecessor, Fosun Group, in the mainland China. He partially owned Fosun International indirectly until 2015. Fan owned 5 shares out of 50 shares (or 10%) of Fosun International's ultimate parent company Fosun International Holdings as of 31 December 2014, which 79.60% stake of the publicly traded company was owned by the holding. He resigned as a non-executive director of Fosun International on 10 July 2014 and withdrew his holding in Fosun International Holdings on 4 September 2014. The number of shares of Fosun International Holdings also reduced to 45.

Fan was also one of the three executive directors of Fosun International's subsidiary Shanghai Forte Land. He changed from executive director to non-executive director in 2013, due to a reported health reason. It was reported that Fan was the leader of the property investment sector of Fosun since the 1990s.

Fan was ranked at 1213 in September 2026 Forbes Rich List with an estimated net worth of USD $3.6 billion.
