= Civilian-run enterprise =

Type of company in China

Civilian-run enterprise is a type of company or enterprise to describe a non-state-owned enterprise (state-owned enterprise including companies owned by the state, the central and regional government) in the People's Republic of China. A privately held company is a type of civilian-run enterprise. However, there is no proper legal definition of "civilian-run enterprise" in China. It is considered to be a special term in the Economy of China (Minqi, Chinese: 民企; pinyin: Mínqǐ) or Chinese: 民营企业; pinyin: Mínyíng qǐyè). The translation of the term "Minqi" was difficult, as stated by Ye Dong, a Chinese businessman during an interview by the Chinese-language version of the Financial Times.

A civilian-run enterprise may be a publicly traded company or a privately held company (any company that is not owned by a government nor listed on the stock exchange). If the company is listed in Hong Kong (and incorporated outside mainland China), it would be referred to as a P chip.

== Notable civilian-run enterprises in China ==
- Fosun International
- Hainan Airlines
- Suning Commerce Group (blue chip of Shenzhen Stock Exchange)
- Wanda Group (one of the 2016 Fortune Global 500)
- Sunac China
- LeEco
