= Liang Xinjun =

Chinese entrepreneur

Liang Xinjun (simplified Chinese: 梁信军; traditional Chinese: 梁信軍) is a Chinese entrepreneur. He is the co-founder and former vice chairman/CEO of Fosun International, one of the largest civilian-run enterprises in China.

== Biography ==
Liang was born in 1968 in Taizhou, Zhejiang. He received his B.A. from Fudan University in 1991, and founded Fosun with Guo Guangchang in 1992. In 2007, he received his MBA degree from Cheung Kong Graduate School of Business.

On Hurun Report's China Rich List 2013, he was ranked 233rd with an estimated wealth of US$1.140 billion.
