= Wang Qunbin =

Chinese billionaire businessman (born 1969)

- 汪群斌
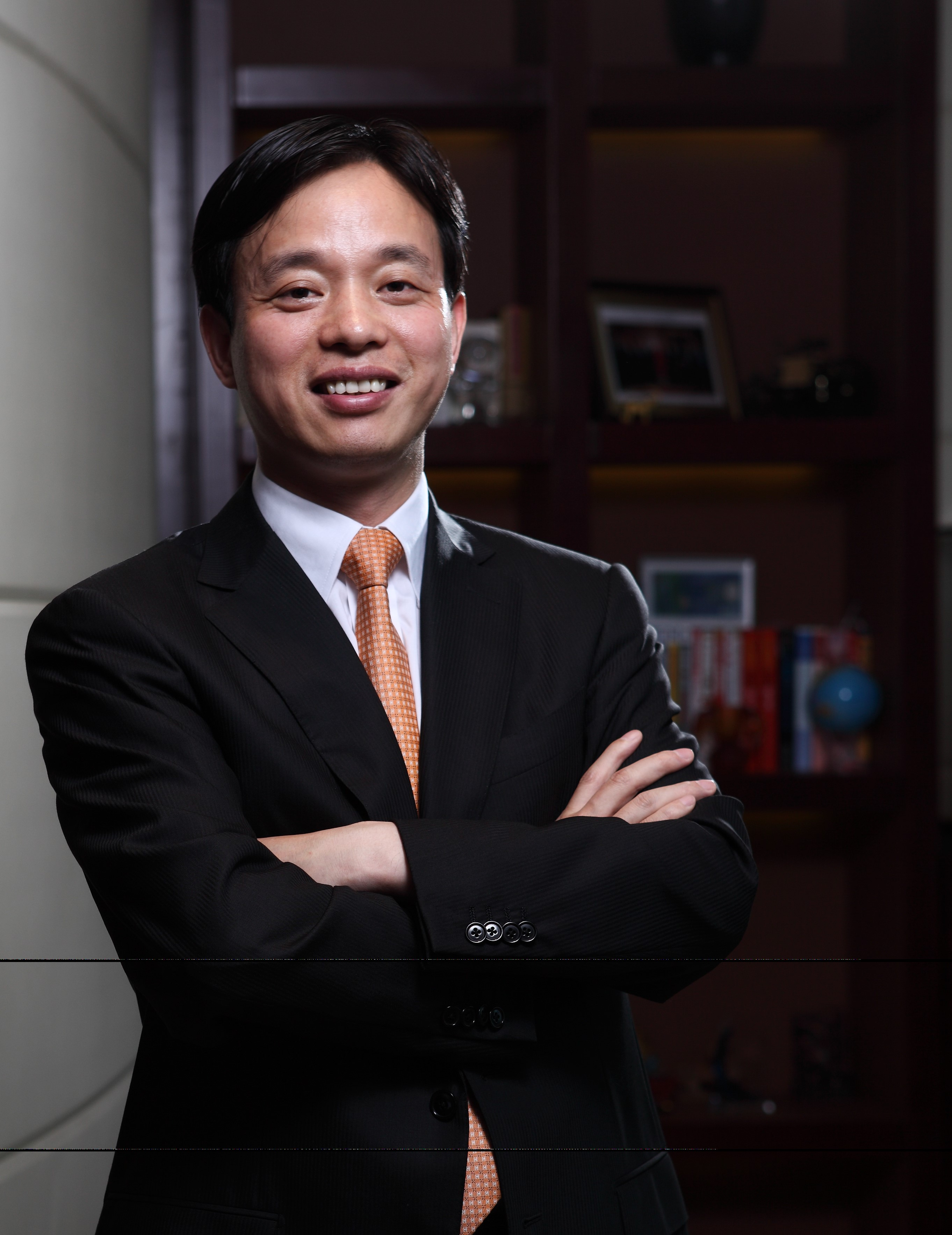
- Born: 1969 (age 56–57)
- Education: Fudan University
- Occupation: Businessman
- Known for: Co-founder of Fosun International
- Title: Co-chairman of Fosun International
- Term: 2017-2020
- Predecessor: Liang Xinjun

Chinese name
- Traditional Chinese: 汪羣斌
- Simplified Chinese: 汪群斌
- Hanyu Pinyin: Wāng Qúnbīn
Transcriptions
Standard Mandarin
- Hanyu Pinyin: Wāng Qúnbīn
- Wade–Giles: Wang^{1} Qun^{2}-bin^{1}

Wang Qunbin (Chinese: 汪群斌; born 1969) is a Chinese billionaire businessman. He was appointed co-chairman of Fosun International in February 2020, and was CEO of Fosun from March 2017 to February 2020, when he replaced Liang Xinjun.

In 1991, Qunbin earned a bachelor's degree in genetic engineering from Fudan University, Shanghai.

He is one of the four co-founders of Fosun, a diversified investment company headquartered in Shanghai, and has been a director since 1994, and president from 2009 to 2017. He resides in Shanghai, China.
