= Fosun International =

Chinese multinational holding company

Fosun International Limited
- Type: Public
- Traded as: SEHK: 656
- Industry: Conglomerate
- Founded: 1992 (predecessor); 1994 (as Fosun Hi-tech); 24 December 2004 (as Fosun Intl.)
- Founder: Guo Guangchang; Liang Xinjun; Wang Qunbin; Fan Wei; Tan Jian
- Headquarters: Shanghai, China; Hong Kong (registered office)
- Key people: Co-Chairman: Guo Guangchang; Co-Chairman: Wang Qunbin; Co-CEO: Chen Qiyu; Co-CEO: Xu Xiaoliang
- Services: Diversified Investments
- Revenue: ▲US$25.4 billion (2021)
- Net income: ▲US$1.6 billion (2021)
- Total assets: ▲US$126.48 billion (2021)
- Number of employees: 71,000 (2019)
- Parent: Fosun International Holdings

Chinese name
- Simplified Chinese: 复星国际有限公司
- Traditional Chinese: 復星國際有限公司
Transcriptions
Standard Mandarin
- Hanyu Pinyin: Fùxīng Guójì Yǒuxiàn Gōngsī

Fosun International
- Simplified Chinese: 复星国际
- Traditional Chinese: 復星國際
Transcriptions
Standard Mandarin
- Hanyu Pinyin: Fùxīng Guójì
- Website: fosun.com

Fosun International Limited is a Chinese multinational conglomerate holding company. Founded in 1992 by Guo Guangchang and four others, the company is headquartered in Shanghai and was incorporated in Hong Kong in 2004. Its Co-CEOs are Chen Qiyu and Xu Xiaoliang. Wang Qunbin joined Guo Guangchang as co-chairman in early 2020. The company has operations in over 35 countries and is one of the largest privately owned conglomerates in China. It was ranked 371st on the Forbes Global 2000 ranking in 2020.

== History ==
=== 1990s ===
Fosun Group was founded in 1992 as the Guangxin Technology Development Company by five graduates of Fudan University in Shanghai: Guo Guangchang, Liang Xinjun, Wang Qunbin (Chinese: 汪群斌), Fan Wei (Chinese: 范伟), and Tan Jian (Chinese: 谈剑). Fosun started its business by doing market research. The major holding company of the group, Fosun High Technology, was incorporated in 1994 in mainland China. Then Fosun extended its business into the healthcare industry (as Fosun Pharmaceutical), real estate, and steel etc. to i9

=== 2000s ===
In 2004, a new holding company of the group, Fosun International Limited was incorporated in Hong Kong. In July 2007, Fosun International was listed on the main board of the Stock Exchange of Hong Kong as SEHK:656.

=== 2010s ===
During 2011, the three major growth engines of Fosun, industrial profits, investment profits and asset management profits rose rapidly, enabling Fosun to make strides toward its vision of becoming "a premium investment group with a focus on China's growth momentum".

From 2010 through 2015, Fosun spent billions buying foreign firms in the healthcare, tourism, fashion, and banking industries in the US and Europe. These included France's Club Med, Britain's Thomas Cook Group, Canada's Cirque du Soleil, American clothing label St John, and Greek jeweler Folli Follie. At the end of 2014 Fosun acquired the US insurer Meadowbrook for around $433 million, marking the first full purchase of a US insurer by a Chinese company. Fosun also purchased Australian oil company Roc Oil, its first acquisition in the petroleum industry.

On 11 December 2015, the chairman of Fosun, Guo Guangchang, was reported missing. Guo however reappeared on 14 December 2015 at a Fosun board of directors meeting. During his disappearance, Fosun requested that trading of shares be temporarily suspended. The Fosun board of directors issued a statement saying that Guo was assisting in a government inquiry which, in their opinion, did not present a "material adverse impact" on Fosun's finances or operations.

In July 2016, Fosun bought the English football club Wolverhampton Wanderers from its previous owner Steve Morgan for an estimated £45 million. Under Fosun's ownership, Wolves have progressed from being a mid table side in the Football League Championship (second tier of English football) to finishing seventh in the FA Premier League, reaching an FA Cup semi-final and qualifying for the UEFA Europa League.

In 2016 Fosun began to invest in India. Delhivery was one such investment made in 2017, in addition to previous investments in MakeMyTrip, India's largest online travel company and Gland Pharma. Fosun is also involved in the Indian real estate market.

On 28 August 2019, Thomas Cook Group announced that the group "had agreed the main terms of a rescue package that will see Hong Kong's Fosun Tourism take over its tour operations and creditor banks and bondholders acquire its airline". In early November 2019, Fosun said it would purchase the Thomas Cook brand for £11m. The company viewed itself as a "potential saviour" by purchasing the name.

=== 2020s ===
In March 2020, the company acquired a 55.4% equity interest in French jewelry brand Djula. They also signed an agreement in July 2020 with a high-end Italian jewelry group to develop the Damiani and Salvini brands in China. In August 2020, the company bought a 30% stake in Jinhui Liquor for $262 million.

In 2022, after has been severely hit by the effects of the COVID-19 pandemic and China's extreme lockdown policies, the Shanghai-based conglomerate divested many of its key assets to avoid defaulting on its short-term debts. By October 2022, Fosun announced that it would sell as much as $11 billion of assets within the next 12 months, amid efforts to bolster both its balance sheet and investor confidence.

== Response to COVID-19 pandemic ==
During the coronavirus pandemic of 2020, Fosun Pharmaceuticals partnered with German biotech firm Biopharmaceutical New Technologies (BioNTech) to produce and distribute the COVID-19 mRNA vaccine BNT162b2. The company also donated medical supplies to several countries during the COVID-19 pandemic.

== Business structure ==
Fosun has a wide array of business activities, including investing in other firms, managing a number of private equity funds, and entering joint ventures.

=== Equity investments ===
Fosun has invested in a number of businesses throughout different sectors, such as asset management, insurance, and industrial operations.

==== Asset management ====
- IDERA Capital. Management (98.00%)
- China Financial Services Holdings (SEHK: 605, 4.9%)
- Fosun Eurasia Capital (in Russia)
- Resolution Property (in UK)
- Rio Bravo Investmentos (in Brazil)
- Fosun Asset Management (in Hong Kong)

==== Banking ====
- Banco Comercial Português (27.06%)
- China Minsheng Bank (2.22%)
- Mybank (25.00%)

==== Entertainment ====
- Cirque du Soleil (25% via private equity funds managed by Fosun International and associated company Yuyuan Tourist Mart)
- Studio 8 (60%)
- Fosun Sports Group (sports, e-sports and game publishing)
  - Wolverhampton Wanderers F.C.
  - Restar Games (game publishing)

==== Fashion ====
Formerly named Fosun Fashion, the fashion sector of Fosun's business is now named Lanvin Group.

- Ahava (99.46%)
- Folli Follie (10%, additional 3.89% stake held by Pramerica-Fosun China Opportunity Fund)
- Lanvin
- Silver Cross (87.23%)
- Sergio Rossi
- St. John Knits (70.00%)
- Tom Tailor (28.89%)
- Wolford

==== Food and drink ====
- Jinhui Liquor
- Sanyuan Foods (20.45%)
- St Hubert (98.12%)
- Tsingtao Brewery (17.99%)

==== Industrial operations ====
- Cainiao (6.77%)
- Delhivery (6.5%)
- Fosun Pharmaceutical (37.94%)
- Gland Pharma (57.86%)
- Hainan Mining (51.57%)
- Fosun High Technology (100%)
- Roc Oil (100%)
- Sinopharm Group
- Sisram Medical
- Zhaojin Mining (3.57%)

==== Insurance ====
- Ameritrust Group (100%)
- Fidelidade (84.99%)
- Fosun United Health Insurance (20.00%)
- NAGICO Insurances (through Peak Reinsurance)
- Peak Reinsurance (86.93%)
- Pramerica Fosun Life Insurance (50.00%)
- New China Life Insurance (3.28%)
- United Family Healthcare
- Yong'an P&C Insurance (40.68%)

==== Investment ====
- Fosun Finance (86%)
- Fosun Hani Securities (100%)
- Miacom Diagnostics
- Guide Investimentos (in Brazil)

==== Media ====
- Focus Media (5.00%)

==== Private hospitals ====
- Chancheng Hospital
- Luz Saúde (through Fidelidade)
- Starcastle Senior Living (50.00%)

==== Real estate ====
- Shanghai Forte Land (100%)
- Shanghai Zendai Property (14.0%)
- Fosun Property Holdings (100%)
  - 126 Madison Avenue (New York)
  - 28 Liberty Street (New York)
  - 73 Miller Street (Sydney)
  - a project in Donggang (Dalian) (64%)
  - Citigroup Center (Tokyo)
  - Lloyds Chambers (London)
  - The Bund Finance Center (50.00%)

==== Retail ====
- Secret Recipe
- Yuyuan Tourist Mart (26.45%)

==== Technology ====
- iFlytek (strategic minority stake)
- Perfect World
- The Floow Limited (15%)
- WeDoctor

==== Tourism ====
- Atlantis Sanya (99.81%)
- Club Med (90.10%)
- MakeMyTrip (1%)

=== Fosun-managed private equity funds ===
- Carlyle-Fosun
- Fosun Capital
- Fosun RZ Capital
- Fosun Chuanghong
- Ji'nan Financial Development Investment Fund
- Pramerica-Fosun China Opportunity Fund
- Shanghai Sunvision Binhe Equity Investment Center
- Shanghai Sunvision Xicheng Equity Investment Center
- Star Capital (Shanghai Star Equity Investment L.P.)
- Weishi Fund
- Zhejiang Growth Fund

=== Joint ventures ===
- Nanjing Nangang Iron and Steel United (60% share capital, 50% voting rights)
  - Besino Environment (100%)
  - Koller (84.50%)
  - Nanjing Iron and Steel Company (SSE: 600282, 48.19%)
- Pramerica–Fosun Life Insurance (50%)

=== Former equity investments ===
- China Huarong Asset Management
- Ironshore
- Thomas Cook Group Plc (5.76% via Fidelidade) - Entered Compulsory Liquidation 23 September 2019
- Thomas Cook Tourism - Sold to eSky Group

== Shareholders ==
The major shareholder of Fosun International was a Hong Kong incorporated company Fosun Holdings, which was a wholly owned subsidiary of British Virgin Islands incorporated company Fosun International Holdings. Three founders of Fosun International, Guo Guangchang, Liang Xinjun and Wang Qunbin, owned 64.45%, 24.44% and 11.11% respectively in Fosun International Holdings. Fan Wei, another founder, withdrew his stake in Fosun International Holdings in September 2015.
