= Guo Guangchang =

Chinese businessman and investor (born 1967)

Guo Guangchang 郭广昌
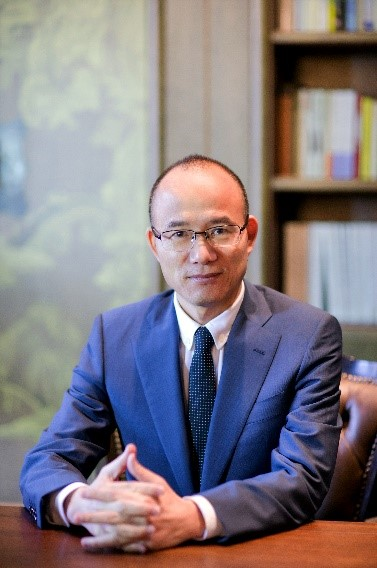
- Born: February 16, 1967 (age 59); Dongyang, Zhejiang, China
- Education: Fudan University
- Occupation: Businessman
- Known for: Founder and chairman, Fosun International Limited
- Spouse: Wang Jinyuan
- Children: 3

Guo Guangchang (simplified Chinese: 郭广昌; traditional Chinese: 郭廣昌, born 16 February 1967) is a Chinese businessman and investor. He is the chairman and co-founder of Fosun International Limited, and a representative of the 12th Chinese People's Political Consultative Conference. As of July 2024, Forbes estimated his net worth was US$2.8 billion. According to Hurun Report's 2019 China Rich List he was the 45th richest person in China.

== Early life ==
Guo Guangchang was born in Dongyang, Zhejiang, in 1967. In 1989, Guo received a BA in Philosophy and an MBA from Fudan University.

== Career ==
=== Guangxin Technology Development Company Ltd. ===
In 1992, Guo founded Guangxin Technology Development Company Ltd, with friends Liang Zinjun and Tan Jian, which was among the first to use scientific methods in market research in mainland China.

=== Fosun Group ===
Since 1994, Guo has been the chairman of Fosun Group and invested in insurance, pharmaceuticals and healthcare, property, steel, mining, retail, services, finance and other investment, and asset management, creating one of the largest non-state owned enterprises in China. Fosun International employs over 74,000 people.

In 2007, Fosun International the holding company of Fosun, was listed on the HKSE. Fosun has invested in Club Med of France, insurance company Fidelidade Seguros of Portugal and Folli Follie of Greece to jointly explore opportunities brought by the growth of China's economy.

It was reported on 11 December 2015 that Guo had been detained by police; Fosun International stated he was "assisting authorities with an investigation". This led to shares in his Hong Kong-listed subsidiary being suspended. On 14 December, Guo was released and appeared at Fosun's annual meeting in Shanghai. It was Guo's first public event after his detainment.

In July 2016, Guo's Fosun International purchased Wolverhampton Wanderers Football Club, a professional association football club based in Wolverhampton, West Midlands, England for a reported £45 million from previous owner Steve Morgan. Wolves went on to clinch the 2017–18 Championship title, to return to the Premier League after a 6-year absence. Wanderers's return to the Premier League resulted in a seventh-place finish in their first season back, their highest placing in the top division since finishing sixth in 1979–80.This position also earned them a place in the Europa League and their first European campaign since 1980–81.

== Politics ==
Guo is a member of the National Committee of the 12th Chinese People's Political Consultative Conference, a member of the Standing Committee of All-China Federation of Industry and Commerce, a member of the Standing Committee of All-China Youth Federation, the Honorary Chairman of Shanghai Zhejiang Chamber of Commerce.

== Recognition and awards ==
As of 2019 he was listed as the 45th richest person in China by Forbes, with a net worth of $6.5 billion. He has been called "China’s Warren Buffett".

In 2017 Guo was honored with the 16th Asia Business Leaders Awards’ Lifetime Achievement Award by CNBC. He received the 2016/17 “Nobel Laureates Series-Asian Chinese Leaders Award” by Asian College of Knowledge Management, and the “Lifetime Achievement Award” at the 8th World Chinese Economic Summit in 2016.
