= COVID-19 vaccination in mainland China =

Plan to immunize against COVID-19

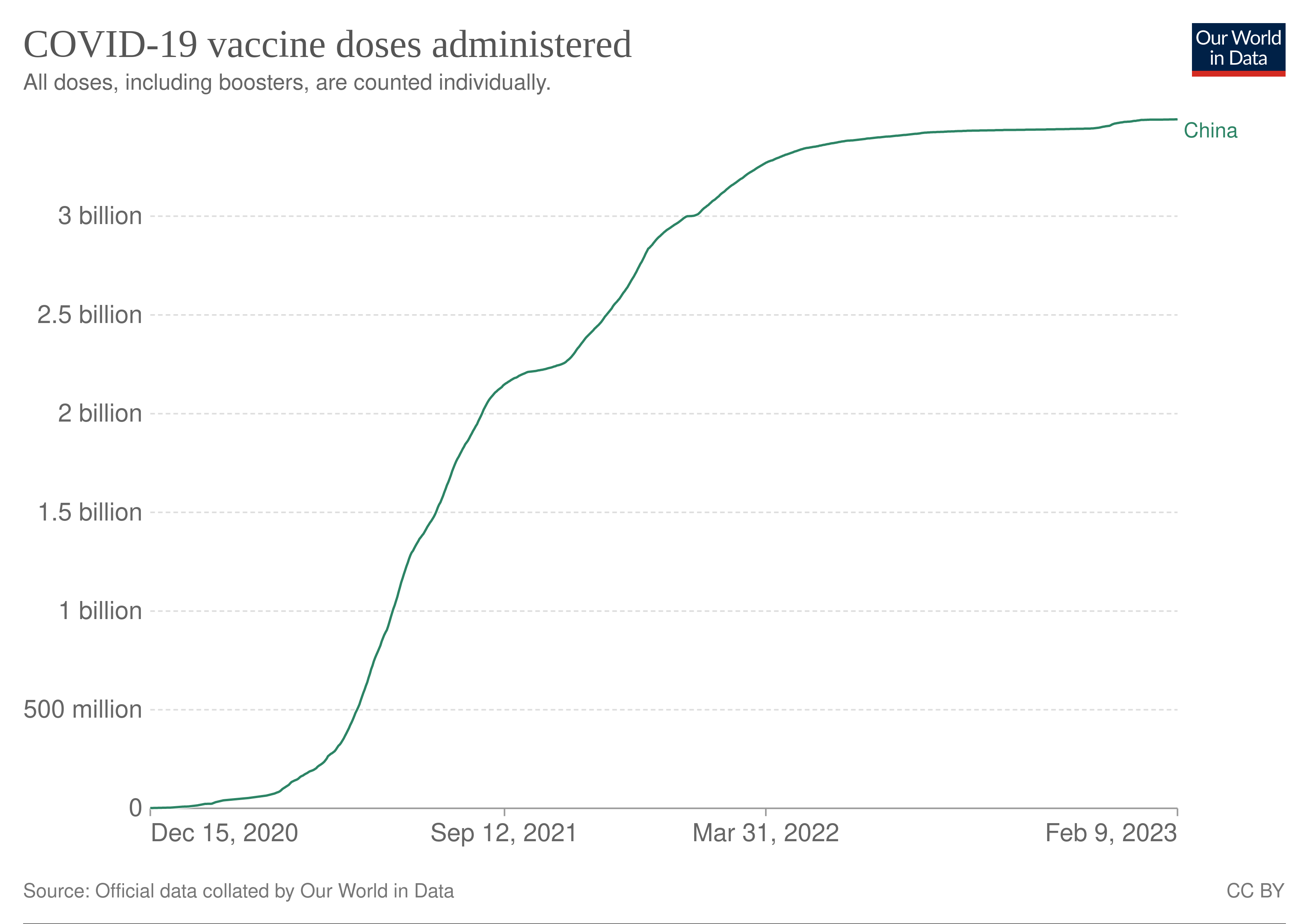
- COVID-19 vaccine doses administered in mainland China.
- Date: 22 July 2020 – 13 April 2023
- Location: China
- Cause: COVID-19 pandemic in mainland China
- Target: Immunization against COVID-19
- Organized by: Joint Prevention and Control Mechanism in Response to the COVID-19 Pandemic of the State Council (headquartered at National Health Commission)
- Participants: 3,516,880,600 (total doses administered)
- Outcome: 1,318,026,800 (total vaccinated); 1,284,479,600 (fully vaccinated)

COVID-19 vaccination in mainland China was an immunization campaign against severe acute respiratory syndrome coronavirus 2 (SARS-CoV-2) in mainland China, in response to the ongoing pandemic in the region.

As of July 2022, it is estimated that about 89.7% of the country's population has received a vaccine, and about 56% of the population has received a booster dose.

== Administration ==
In June 2020, the Sinopharm BIBP vaccine (BBIBP-CorV) was authorized for emergency use in China. On 22 July, Chinese authorities started the emergency use of COVID-19 vaccines.

On 15 December 2020, the COVID-19 vaccination for people under high risk started in China. On 19 December 2020, the National Health Commission (NHC) said that there has been 1 million doses of COVID-19 vaccine administered in China as of the day, and no serious adverse reactions were observed.

On 31 December 2020, NHC announced that the Sinopharm BIBP vaccine has been approved through the conditional marketing authorization process, and more than 3 million doses of COVID-19 vaccine has been administered in China. At the same time, NHC declares that COVID-19 vaccination is free to Chinese citizens.

On 27 January 2021, NHC said that the vaccination is being carried out in order, and there has been 22.767 million doses of COVID-19 vaccine administered in China as of 26 January.

On 1 March 2021, Zhong Nanshan said that the vaccination rate of COVID-19 vaccine in China was currently 3.56%, and the Chinese Center for Disease Control and Prevention hoped the rate reach 40% by the end of June 2021.

Since late March 2021, the authorities has accelerated the promotion of free COVID-19 vaccination for the whole population. On 22 March 2021, Sun Chunlan, the Vice Premier of the State Council, stated that COVID-19 vaccination in China should be accelerated and the vaccination rate should be increased. On 24 March 2021, NHC announced that the number doses of COVID-19 vaccine administered will be daily reported on its website and social media account since that day. On 29 March 2021, NHC released the first version of the COVID-19 Vaccine Technology Guide.

On 21 April 2021, NHC stated that more than 200 million doses of COVID-19 vaccine has been administered in China, and 80% of doctors and nurses has been vaccinated.

On 14 May 2021, NHC restated that the COVID-19 administration progress should be accelerated due to the proportion of mutated SARS-CoV-2 and the re-appearance of local cases.

On 19 June 2021, NHC announced that more than 1.01489 billion doses of COVID-19 vaccine has been administered in China.

While public authorities have mandated lockdowns and mandatory mass testing for areas with infection, there has not been any rule to making vaccination mandatory. Some facilities within China have made vaccination mandatory for entry, including things like movie theatres, fitness centres, internet bars, museums and libraries.

In July 2022, according to official figures, while 89% had received 2 doses, only 56% of eligible people had received a booster dose. Furthermore, this was even lower among vulnerable elderly age groups, with only 19.7% of people over the age of 80 having received a booster dose. According to BBC reporting, this may have been attributed to public confidence in the ability of authorities to control outbreaks, the narrative presented by public authorities within China that the virus was mainly an overseas problem as well as some doctors within China who warned vulnerable people of the health risks of the vaccine.

Doses of COVID-19 vaccine administrated in mainland China
As of	Doses administrated (in million)	References
19 Dec (2020)	>1	
31 Dec (2020)	>3	
27 Jan (2021)	22.767	
9 Feb	40.52	
15 Mar	64.98	
28 Mar	102.417	
21 Apr	204.191	
7 May	308.226	
16 May	406.938	
23 May	510.858	
28 May	602.991	
2 Jun	704.826	
8 Jun	808.962	
14 Jun	904.134	
19 Jun	1,010.489	
24 Jun	1,120.643	
28 Jun	1,206.714	
4 July	1,305.499	
14 July	1,414.609	
22 July	1,507.605	
28 July	1,601.249	
3 August	1,708.356	
10 August	1,808.092	
18 August	1,900.127	
26 August	2,003.914	

== Vaccines ==
As of 21 November 2022, seven vaccines have been approved in mainland China through conditional marketing authorization or emergency use authorization.

In 2021 Nature reported that "studies have questioned the length of protection" that domestic vaccines such as CoronaVac and Sinopharm offer, especially when compared to mRNA vaccines. A 2022 meta-analysis found about 65% vaccine effectiveness against infection for CoronoVac, compared with about 90% for Pfizer and 98% for Moderna. Some analysts have criticized China's reluctance to import mRNA vaccines.

Vaccine	Type	Made by	Origin	Dose required for vaccination	Effective rate (Phase III)	Approval	Deployment	WHO Listed
Sinopharm BIBP	Inactivated	Beijing Institute of Biological Products	China	2 doses	78.1%	Conditional (31 December 2020)	31 December 2020	7 May 2021
CoronaVac	Inactivated	Sinovac Biotech	China	2 doses	50.7% - 83.5%	Conditional (5 February 2021)	5 February 2021	1 June 2021
Sinopharm WIBP	Inactivated	Wuhan Institute of Biological Products	China	2 doses	72.8%	Conditional (25 February 2021)	25 February 2021	
KCONVAC	Inactivated	Kangtai Biological Products Co. Ltd.	China	2 doses	—N/a	EUA (14 May 2021)	1 June 2021	
Covidful	Inactivated	Institute of Medical Biology, Chinese Academy of Medical Sciences	China	2 doses	—N/a	EUA (9 June 2021)	9 June 2021	
Convidecia	Viral vector	CanSino	China	1 dose	65.7%	Conditional (25 February 2021)	25 February 2021	19 May 2022
ZIFIVAX	Subunit	Zhifei Bio-tech	China	3 doses	82%	EUA (10 March 2021)	10 March 2021	

The Pfizer–BioNTech COVID-19 vaccine, agented by Fosun Pharma in mainland China, is waiting for approval.

Vaccine	Type	Made by	Origin	Dose required for vaccination	Effective rate (Phase III)	Approval	Deployment	WHO Listed
Comirnaty	mRNA	BioNTech and Fosun Pharma	Germany			Waiting for Approval		31 December 2020

== See also ==
- COVID-19 vaccines
- COVID-19 pandemic in mainland China
