= Sinopharm (disambiguation) =

China National Pharmaceutical Group, known as Sinopharm and sometimes Sinopharm Group, is a Chinese state-owned enterprise, the ultimate parent company of all Sinopharm companies.

Sinopharm may also refer to:

- Sinopharm COVID-19 vaccine (disambiguation)
  - Sinopharm BIBP COVID-19 vaccine
  - Sinopharm WIBP COVID-19 vaccine
  - Sinopharm CNBG COVID-19 vaccine
- Sinopharm Group Co., Ltd., a Chinese publicly traded company on the Hong Kong Stock Exchange
