= Sinopharm COVID-19 vaccine =

Sinopharm COVID-19 vaccine may refer to:

- Sinopharm BIBP COVID-19 vaccine
- Sinopharm CNBG COVID-19 vaccine
- Sinopharm WIBP COVID-19 vaccine
