= COVID-19 vaccination in the United Arab Emirates =

Plan to immunize against COVID-19

- Date: December 2020 – November 2022
- Location: United Arab Emirates
- Cause: COVID-19 pandemic in the United Arab Emirates
- Target: Immunization against COVID-19
- Organised by: Ministry of Health
- Participants: 16,444,844 total doses administered: First dose: 7,684,876; Second dose: 6,765,065
- Outcome: 77.70% of the Emirati population has received at least one dose of a vaccine; 68.40% has received both doses of a vaccine
- Website: United Arab Emirates COVID-19 Data

The COVID-19 vaccination in the United Arab Emirates was a national immunization campaign in the United Arab Emirates in response to the COVID-19 pandemic.

The vaccination campaign began in December 2020 after its authorization of emergency use of Sinopharm BIBP COVID-19 vaccine.

The Ministry of Health and Prevention (MOHAP) had approved six COVID-19 vaccines; the following are: Sinopharm BIBP, Pfizer-BioNTech, Sputnik V, Oxford–AstraZeneca, Moderna, and Sinopharm CNBG.

The United Arab Emirates ended all of its COVID-19 related public health measures on 6 November 2022.

== Background ==
COVID-19 is an infectious disease caused by severe acute respiratory syndrome coronavirus 2 (SARS-CoV-2). The first reported case of SARS-CoV-2 was identified in Wuhan, Hubei, China. In January 2020, first cases of COVID-19 was reported in the United Arab Emirates.

In October 2020, Dubai relaxed its entry requirements for tourists. Despite the initial influx of tourists, Dubai and the wider United Arab Emirates (UAE) were forced to reintroduce restrictions in response to a surge in COVID-19 cases.

To combat the pandemic, the UAE launched an ambitious vaccination program with the goal of vaccinating half of its population by April 2021.

The UAE's efforts saw it become one of the top countries in terms of vaccinations per capita, using the BBIBP-CorV vaccine, developed by China's Sinopharm.

The decision to use the Sinopharm vaccine reflects broader historical and diplomatic ties between China and the Middle East. China has long engaged in medical diplomacy with Gulf countries, providing medical teams and supplies during the early stages of the pandemic.

=== Approvals ===
The United Arab Emirates has issued an approval of emergency use on the following dates:

- 9 December 2020 – Sinopharm BIBP COVID-19 vaccine.
- 22 December 2020 – Pfizer-BioNTech COVID-19 vaccine.
- 21 January 2021 – Sputnik V COVID-19 vaccine.
- February – Oxford–AstraZeneca COVID-19 vaccine.
- 4 July 2021 – Moderna COVID-19 vaccine.
- 27 December 2021 – Sinopharm CNBG COVID-19 vaccine.
