= Sinovac Biotech =

Chinese biopharmaceutical company

Coordinates: 40.031°N 116.3003°E

Sinovac Biotech Ltd.

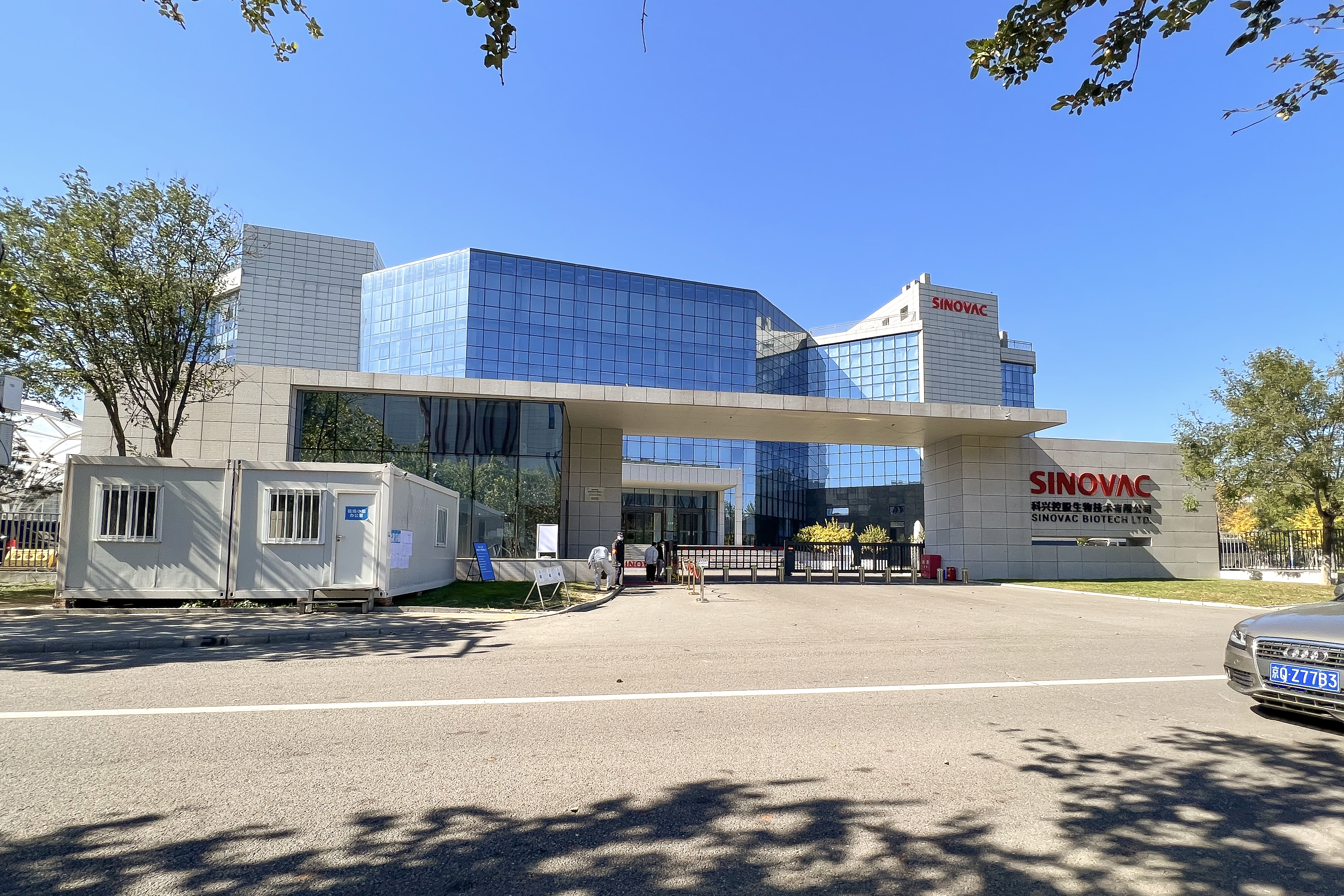
- Type: Public
- Traded as: Nasdaq: SVA
- Founded: 1999; 27 years ago
- Founder: Yin Weidong
- Headquarters: 39 Shang Di West Road, Haidian District, Beijing, China
- Products: Vaccines for COVID-19, hepatitis A
- Revenue: ▲US$386 million (2025)
- Net income: ▼ −US$59.7 million (2025)
- Number of employees: 4,281 (as of 2022)

Chinese name
- Simplified Chinese: 科兴控股生物技术有限公司
- Traditional Chinese: 科興控股生物技術有限公司
- Literal meaning: Kexing Holdings Biotechnology Co., Ltd.
Transcriptions
Standard Mandarin
- Hanyu Pinyin: Kē Xìng Kònggǔ Shēngwù Jìshù Yǒuxiàn Gōngsī
- Wade–Giles: Kʻo-Hsing Kʻung-ku Sheng-wu Chi-shu Yu-Hsien-Kung-Ssŭ
- Website: www.sinovac.com

Sinovac Biotech Ltd. (Chinese: 科兴控股生物技术有限公司) is a Chinese biopharmaceutical company based in Haidian District, Beijing, that focuses on the research, development, manufacture, and commercialization of vaccines that protect against human infectious diseases. The company was listed on the Nasdaq but the exchange halted Sinovac's trading in February 2019 due to a proxy fight. The company has faced bribery probes in China. Its COVID-19 vaccine was the target of a covert disinformation campaign by the US government and a promotional social media astroturfing campaign by the Chinese government.

== Vaccines ==
Sinovac's commercialized vaccines include the discontinued CoronaVac (COVID-19 vaccine), Inlive (Enterovirus 71 vaccine), Anflu (influenza vaccine), Healive (hepatitis A vaccine), varicella vaccine and mumps vaccine.

=== COVID-19 vaccine development ===
CoronaVac was an inactivated virus COVID-19 vaccine developed by Sinovac. It had been in Phase III clinical trials in Brazil, Chile, Indonesia, Philippines, and Turkey.

It relies on traditional technology similar to the Sinopharm BIBP vaccine and Covaxin, otherwise known as inactivated-virus COVID-19 vaccines in Phase III trials. CoronaVac does not need to be frozen, and both the vaccine and raw material for formulating the new doses could be transported and refrigerated at 2–8 °C (36–46 °F), temperatures at which flu vaccines are kept.

A real-world study of ten millions of Chileans who received CoronaVac found it 66% effective against symptomatic COVID-19, 88% against hospitalization, 90% against ICU admissions, and 86% against deaths. In Brazil, after 75% of the population in Serrana, São Paulo received CoronaVac, preliminary results show deaths fell by 95%, hospitalizations by 86%, and symptomatic cases by 80%. In Indonesia, real world data from 128,290 healthcare workers showed 94% protection against symptomatic infection by the vaccine, beating results in clinical trials.

Phase III results from Turkey published in The Lancet showed an efficacy of 84% based on 10,218 participants in the trials. Phase III results from Brazil previously showed 50.7% efficacy at preventing symptomatic infections and 83.7% effective in preventing mild cases needing treatment. Efficacy against symptomatic infections increased to 62.3% with an interval of 21 days or more between the doses.

CoronaVac was used in vaccination campaigns in various countries in Asia, South America, North America, and Europe. By April 2021, Sinovac had a production capacity of two billion doses a year and had delivered 600 million total doses. It is currently being manufactured at several facilities in China, Brazil, and Egypt. On 1 June 2021, the World Health Organization (WHO) validated the vaccine for emergency use. Sinovac signed purchase agreements for 380 million doses from COVAX.

In January 2024, Sinovac confirmed that it had discontinued production of CoronaVac.

==== Disinformation and influence operations ====
According to an investigative report by Reuters, the United States ran a propaganda campaign to discredit the China's Sinovac COVID-19 inoculation, including using fake social media accounts to spread disinformation that the Sinovac vaccine contained pork-derived ingredients and was therefore haram under Islamic law.

During the COVID-19 pandemic, China's growing influence by donating vaccines and aid, had prompted US military leaders to initiate a covert propaganda operation. A senior US military officer involved with the campaign had told Reuters that the US failed to effectively share vaccines with partners, leaving them without much options but to undermine China's diplomatic efforts. US military leaders took precedence over diplomats, fearing that China's COVID diplomacy might draw South-East Asian countries closer to Beijing. The US government later justified its covert disinformation campaign by framing it as retaliation for China's disinformation, which had falsely blamed the United States for the spread of COVID-19. Additionally, the campaign reportedly aimed to counter "China’s COVID diplomacy", and so to ultimately undermine closer ties between China and countries like the Philippines as a result of such diplomacy during the pandemic. The campaign primarily targeted people in the Philippines and used a social media hashtag for "China is the virus" in Tagalog. The campaign ran from the spring of 2020 to mid-2021. The primary contractor for the U.S. military on the project was General Dynamics IT, which received $493 million for its role. After some American public health experts were briefed by Reuters on the Pentagon's covert anti-vax campaign, they condemned the campaign as unjustifiable, and that it had unethically endangered innocent lives for potential geopolitical gain.

A 2025 Reuters report found that the Embassy of China in Manila hired a local marketing firm to conduct a covert "public opinion guidance" astroturfing campaign that included promoting CoronaVac in the country.

== See also ==
- CanSino Biologics
- Sinopharm
