= Chinese Academy of Medical Sciences COVID-19 vaccine =

Vaccine against COVID-19

Vaccine description
- Target: SARS-CoV-2
- Vaccine type: Inactivated

Clinical data
- Other names: Covidful (Chinese: 科维福; pinyin: Kēwéifú)
- Routes of administration: Intramuscular

Legal status
- Legal status: Emergency authorization: China

Identifiers
- CAS Number: 2699688-05-4
- DrugBank: DB15863

Chinese Academy of Medical Sciences COVID-19 vaccine, or IMBCAMS COVID-19 vaccine, traded as Covidful (Chinese: 科维福; pinyin: Kēwéifú), is a COVID-19 vaccine developed by Institute of Medical Biology, Chinese Academy of Medical Sciences.

== Clinical trials ==
In May 2020, Covidful started phase I/II clinical trial with 942 participants in China.

In January 2021, Covidful started phase III clinical trials with 34,020 from Brazil and Malaysia.

== Authorizations ==
On 9 June 2021, the vaccine has been approved by the Chinese authorities.
