= Wuhan Institute of Biological Products =

R&D center of China National Pharmaceutical Group in Wuhan

The Wuhan Institute of Biological Products (WIBP Chinese: 武汉生物制品研究所) or Wuhan Institute of Biology for short is a subsidiary of China National Pharmaceutical Group, a Chinese state-owned enterprise commonly known as Sinopharm. The institute integrates production, education, research, and marketing, and operates one of the main production facilities for biological products in China, with over 1,000 employees. The commercial arm of the institute operates a wholly owned subsidiary called Wuhan Zhongsheng Yujin Biomedical, which is primarily focused on the production distribution of blood products including human albumin, human immune globulin and tetanus immune globulin. The educational arm of the institute confers Master's degrees and runs doctoral and postdoctoral programs in biotechnology related fields. The institute was established in September 1950 in Wuchang District, moving in 2016 to the Zhengdian Gold Industrial Park in Jiangxia District, next to the Wuhan Institute of Virology, with which it collaborates closely.

== Divisions ==
National Engineering Technology Research Center for Combined Vaccines

== See also ==
- Sinopharm WIBP COVID-19 vaccine
- Wuhan Centre for Disease Control
