= Plague vaccine =

Vaccine used against Yersinia pestis

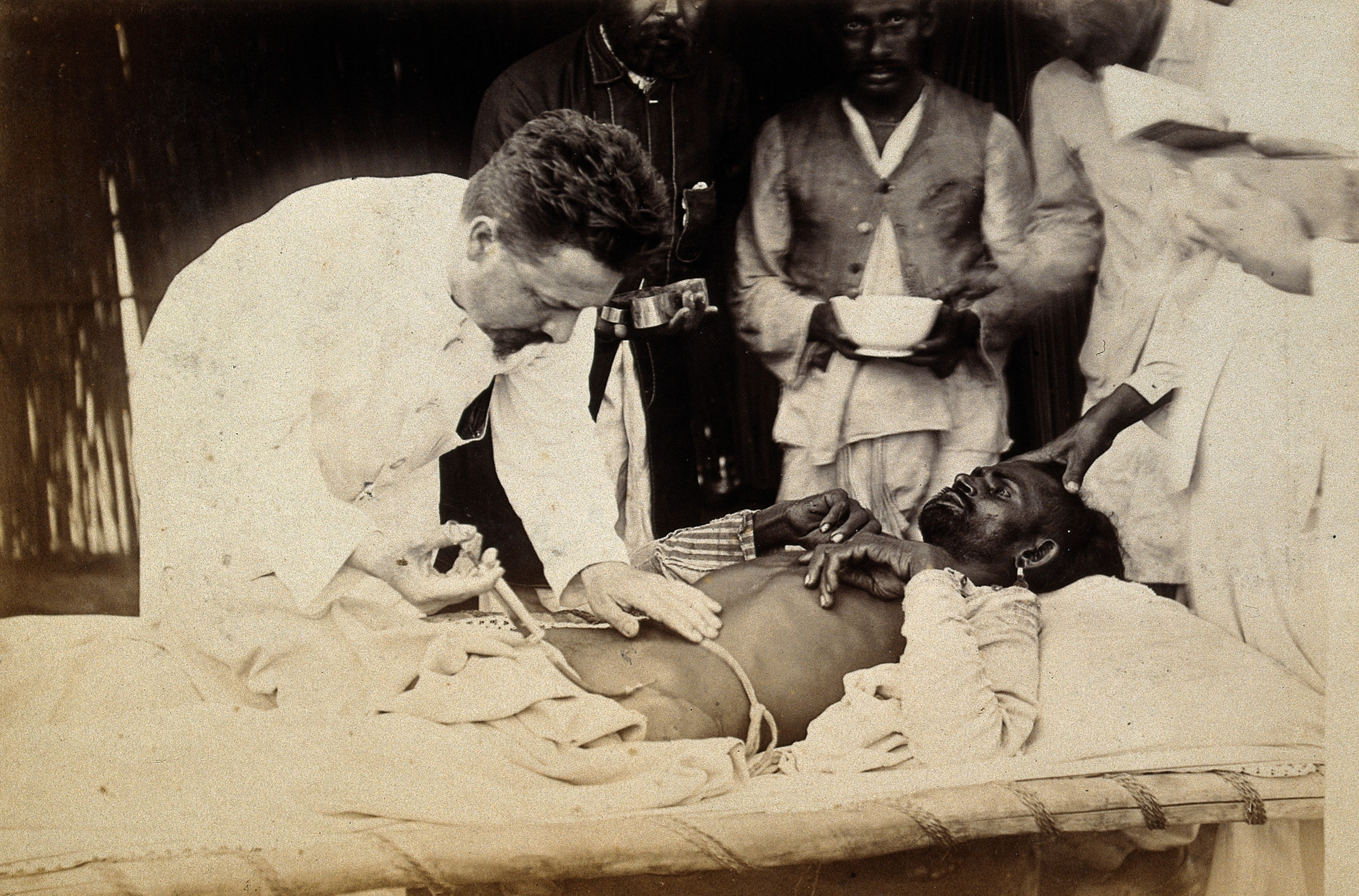
- Plague vaccine being administered

Vaccine description
- Target: Yersinia pestis
- Vaccine type: Attenuated

Clinical data
- AHFS/Drugs.com: Micromedex Detailed Consumer Information
- ATC code: J07AK01 (WHO)

Identifiers
- ChemSpider: none
- UNII: G10832YT0L

Plague vaccine is a vaccine used against Yersinia pestis to prevent the plague. Inactivated bacterial vaccines have been used since 1890 but are less effective against the pneumonic plague, so live, attenuated vaccines and recombinant protein vaccines have been developed to prevent the disease.

== Plague immunization ==
The first plague vaccine was developed by bacteriologist Waldemar Haffkine in 1897. He tested the vaccine on himself to prove that the vaccine was safe. Later, Haffkine conducted a massive inoculation program in British India, and it is estimated that 26 million doses of Haffkine's anti-plague vaccine were sent out from Bombay between 1897 and 1925, reducing the plague mortality by 50–85%.

A plague vaccine is used for an induction of active specific immunity in an organism susceptible to plague by means of administrating an antigenic material (a vaccine) via a variety of routes to people at risk of contracting any clinical form of plague. This method is known as plague immunization. There is strong evidence for the efficacy of administration of some plague vaccines in preventing or ameliorating the effects of a variety of clinical forms of infection by Yersinia pestis. Plague immunization also encompasses incurring a state of passive specific immunity to plague in a susceptible organism after administration of a plague serum or plague immunological in people with an immediate risk of developing the disease.

A systematic review by the Cochrane Collaboration found no studies of sufficient quality to be included in the review, and were thus unable to make any statement on the efficacy of modern plague vaccines.
