= CoronaVac =

Vaccine against COVID-19

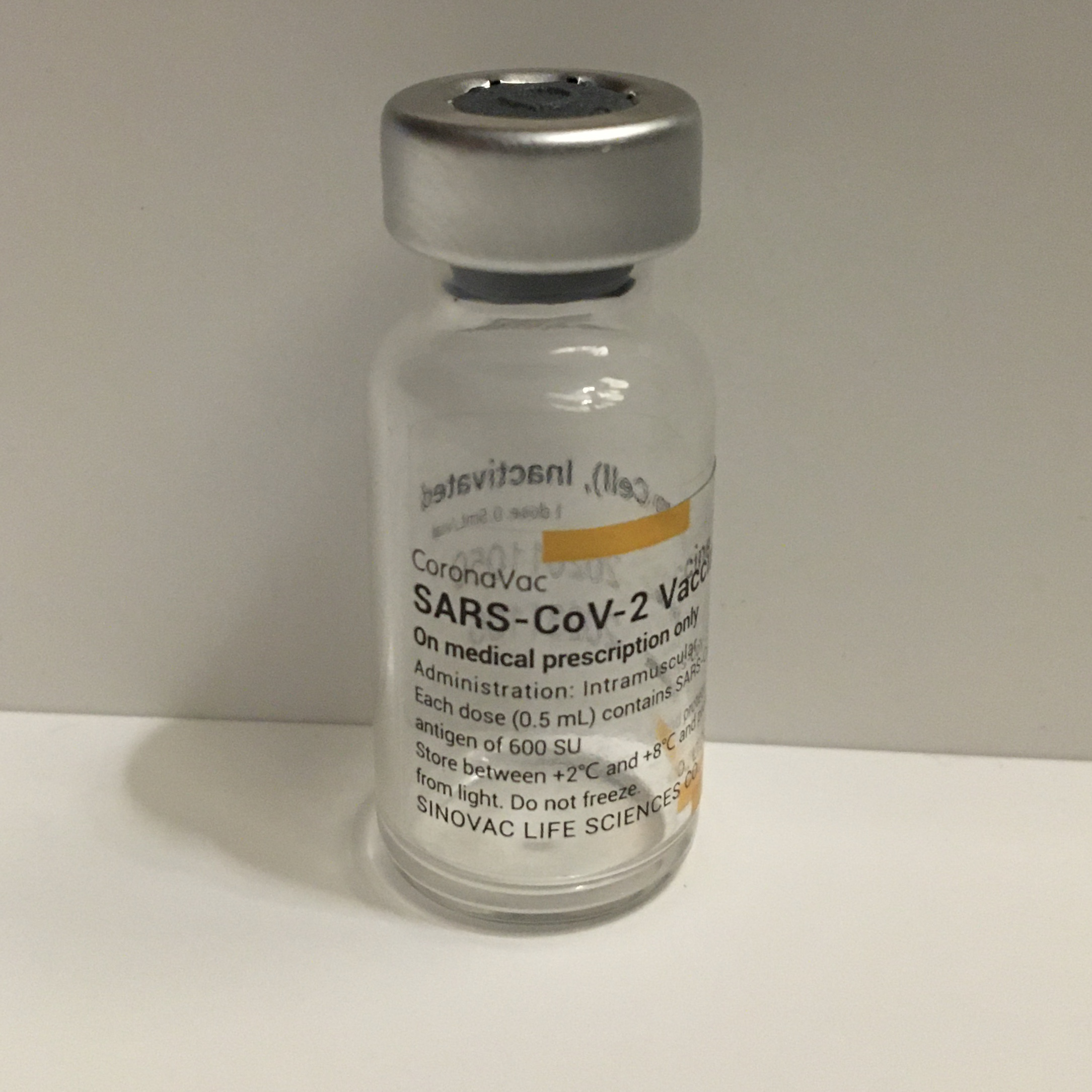
- An empty vial of the CoronaVac vaccine

Vaccine description
- Target: SARS-CoV-2
- Vaccine type: Inactivated

Clinical data
- Trade names: CoronaVac
- Other names: PiCoVacc
- Routes of administration: Intramuscular
- ATC code: J07BN03 (WHO)

Legal status
- Legal status: BR: Emergency use; Full list of CoronaVac authorizations

Identifiers
- CAS Number: 2480309-93-9
- DrugBank: DB15806
- UNII: M1QXB372B8

CoronaVac, also known as the Sinovac COVID-19 vaccine, was a whole inactivated virus SARS-CoV-2 vaccine developed by Sinovac and extensively deployed globally to control the COVID-19 pandemic. Its use was highest in low- and middle-income countries. In January 2024, Sinovac confirmed that production of CoronaVac had been discontinued.

Clinical trials have demonstrated that a standard two-dose regimen provides moderate efficacy against symptomatic COVID-19, ranging from about 50% to 83% depending on population and circulating viral variants, with more robust protection observed against severe disease, hospitalization, and death. Although most adverse reactions are mild and serious vaccine-related events are rare, the vaccine’s immune protection against symptomatic infection wanes over time, especially in the context of emerging variants such as Omicron, leading to recommendations for booster doses to sustain immunity and reduce severe outcomes. Overall, CoronaVac’s safety and efficacy profile in preventing severe COVID-19 have contributed to its use in vaccination programs, particularly in regions with limited access to mRNA vaccines.

On 1 June 2021, the World Health Organization (WHO) validated CoronaVac for emergency use. Sinovac subsequently signed agreements to supply 380 million doses to COVAX.

By July 2021, CoronaVac was the most widely used COVID-19 vaccine globally, with about 943 million doses delivered. As of 14 October 2021, it remained the vaccine with the highest number of doses administered worldwide.

== Medical uses ==
The vaccine is given by intramuscular injection into the deltoid muscle. The initial course consists of two doses. The World Health Organization (WHO) recommends an interval of 4 weeks between doses, with data from Chile suggesting that a longer interval provides more robust immunity.

Early evidence suggested that immunity wanes rapidly, so a booster dose after the initial course might be needed.

=== Effectiveness ===
In Brazil, a study was conducted in Serrana, population 45,000, where authorities attempted to vaccinate the entire adult population with CoronaVac. After 75% of the adult population received the vaccine, preliminary results show deaths fell by 95%, hospitalizations by 86% and symptomatic cases by 80%. According to Ricardo Palacios, a director at São Paulo's Instituto Butantan, "The most important result was understanding that we can control the pandemic even without vaccinating the entire population."

In July 2021, researchers from the Chilean Ministry of Health published a paper containing real-world data for their vaccination campaign. The study was conducted between 2 February and 1 May 2021, consisting of 10.2 million people. The effectiveness of CoronaVac vaccine after the second dose was 66% (95% CI, 65–67%) in preventing symptomatic disease, 88% (87–88%) for hospitalization, 90% (89–91%) for ICU admission, and 86% (85–88%) in preventing COVID-19 related deaths. The effectiveness after the first dose was 16% (95% CI, 14–17%) against symptomatic disease, 37% (35–40%) against hospitalization, 45% (41–48%) against ICU admission, and 46% (41–50%) against deaths. The study concluded that the vaccine was effective in preventing COVID-19.

In May 2021, real-world data from Indonesia showed the vaccine was highly effective, with 94% of inoculated health care workers protected against symptomatic infection by the vaccine, besting results of clinical trials. In this study of 128,290 health workers in Jakarta, less than 1% of the vaccinated healthcare workers contracted symptomatic COVID-19, compared to more than 8% among the unvaccinated healthcare workers. The vaccine reduced the risk of hospitalization and death of the inoculated medical workers by 96% and 98% respectively.

Uruguay released real-world data based on 795,684 people who have received both doses of CoronaVac for more than 14 days as of 1 June 2021. In this group, 8,298 tested positive, 45 were admitted to the ICU, and 35 died of COVID-19. This indicated 64.52% and 61.47% effectiveness in reducing COVID-19 cases for people aged 18–49 and 50 and older respectively. The vaccine was 94.95% and 92.18% effective in reducing ICU admissions, and 95.35% and 95.2% effective to prevent deaths. Among fully-vaccinated healthcare professionals, the vaccine was 66% effective in preventing cases, and 100% effective in preventing ICU admissions and deaths.

Preliminary results from a test-negative case-control study from 19 January to 13 April 2021 in Manaus suggest that, after just one dose, the vaccine is 35% (95% CI, −7 to 61%) effective against asymptomatic infections and 50% (95% CI, 11–71%) against symptomatic disease. The one-dose group consisted of 53,176 healthcare professionals. During the study, 66% of the samples were of the Gamma variant. The same study found paradoxically reduced effectiveness against symptomatic disease in another group that received two doses, an effect attributed by the authors to unmeasured confounding leading to downward bias in the efficacy estimate.

In Chile, the effectiveness against symptomatic disease dropped from 67% between February–April 2021 to 58.5% in early July. Because of this, on 11 August, Chile began giving an additional dose of the Oxford–AstraZeneca vaccine to people over 55 who were fully vaccinated with CoronaVac before 31 March.

In October 2021, a large scale study in Chile with 2,017,878 participants reported that, with a CoronaVac booster, effectiveness against hospitalization increased from 84% to 88% and effectiveness against symptomatic disease increased from 56% to 80%. The greatest increases were seen with a heterologous Oxford–AstraZeneca vaccine booster, resulting in 96% effectiveness against hospitalization and 93% against symptomatic disease.

A study by the University of Hong Kong in December 2021 found that a third dose of CoronaVac does not provide sufficient protection against the Omicron variant, directly contradicting the vaccine manufacturer's claim and a study by the Pontifical Catholic University of Chile that it does.

In April 2022, a Singapore study by infectious diseases experts from the National Centre for Infectious Diseases and the Ministry of Health found that CoronaVac recipients were 4.59 times more likely to have severe COVID-19 as well as 2.37 times more likely to be infected, compared to those who took the Pfizer-BioNTech vaccine.

==== Variants ====
In the following tables, a vaccine is generally considered effective if the estimate is ≥50% with a >30% lower limit of the 95% confidence interval. Effectiveness is generally expected to slowly decrease over time.

Initial effectiveness by variant
Doses	Severity of illness	Delta	Gamma
1	Asymptomatic	Not reported	16% (15–17%)
1	Symptomatic	14% (−60 to 55%) (Note: Efficacy from a study with 366 participants.)	Not reported
1	Hospitalization	Not reported	27% (25–28%)
2	Asymptomatic	Not reported	54% (53–55%)
2	Symptomatic	59% (16–82%)	Not reported
2	Moderate (Note: Cases with imaging characteristics of pneumonia and also fever and respiratory symptoms.)	70% (43–96%)	Not reported
2	Hospitalization	100% (Note: A confidence interval was not provided, so it is not possible to know the accuracy of this measurement.)	73% (72–74%)

==== In the elderly ====
A test-negative case-control study from 17 January to 29 April 2021 in the state of São Paulo, during which 86% of the collected genotype isolates were of the Gamma variant, with 43,774 participants aged 70 years or older, found an effectiveness after two doses of 47% (95% CI, 39–54%) against symptomatic disease, 56% (95% CI, 47–63%) against hospitalization and 61% (95% CI, 49–71%) against death. After a single dose, the effectiveness was only 13% (4–21%) against symptomatic disease, 17% (6–27%) against hospitalization and 31% (18–43%) against death, highlighting the importance of receiving the second dose. The study also found that effectiveness against symptomatic disease decreased with increasing age:

Initial effectiveness in old age after two doses (Brazil)
Severity of illness	Age 70–74	Age 75–79	Age ≥80
Symptomatic	59% (44–70%)	56% (43–66%)	33% (17–46%)
Hospitalization	78% (63–87%)	67% (52–77%)	39% (21–53%)
Death	84% (59–94%)	78% (59–88%)	44% (20–61%)

Preliminary data from a large effectiveness study in Brazil with 61 million individuals from 18 January to 30 June 2021, when the Gamma variant was dominant in the country, indicate that effectiveness is markedly reduced in those aged 90 or older, attributable to immunosenescence:

Initial effectiveness by age (Brazil)
Doses	Severity of illness	Age <60	Age 60–69	Age 70–79	Age 80–89	Age ≥90
1	Asymptomatic	14% (12–16%)	15% (13–18%)	25% (23–27%)	2% (−3 to 6%) (Note: The confidence interval includes zero, so it is possible that vaccination had no effect.)	−19% (−31 to 9%)
1	Hospitalization	34% (27–40%)	30% (26–33%)	33% (30–35%)	8% (2–14%)	−16% (−31 to 3%)
1	Death	42% (26–54%)	36% (30–41%)	38% (35–42%)	10% (3–11%)	−22% (−41 to 6%)
2	Asymptomatic	45% (43–46%)	56% (54–57%)	62% (61–63%)	57% (55–60%)	32% (24–38%)
2	Hospitalization	84% (81–87%)	78% (76–80%)	74% (73–75%)	63% (60–66%)	33% (23–41%)
2	Death	77% (67–83%)	79% (77–80%)	78% (77–80%)	67% (64–71%)	35% (24–45%)

=== Specific populations ===
On 21 October 2021, the WHO recommended a third dose as part of the initial course for older adults 3–6 months after the second dose and for immunocompromised individuals 1–3 months after the second dose because these groups mount a weaker immune response compared to healthy adults. Where supplies are limited, the third dose for seniors should be given after achieving high coverage with two doses.

== Manufacturing ==
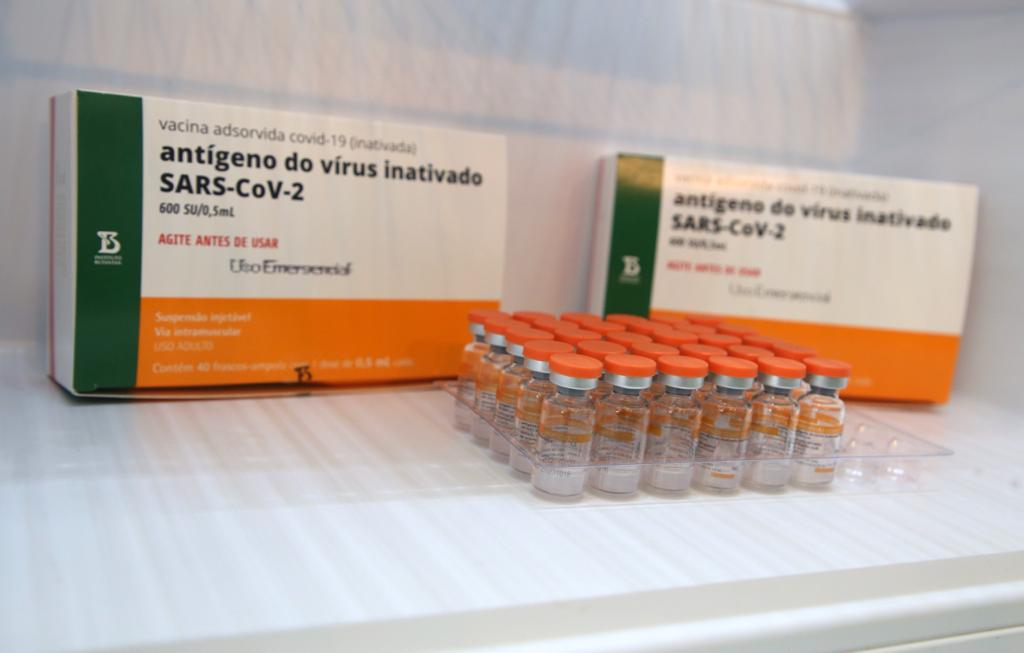
Brazilian version of CoronaVac, filled and finished by Instituto Butantan

As an inactivated vaccine like the Sinopharm BIBP vaccine and Covaxin, CoronaVac uses a more traditional technology that is similar to the inactivated polio vaccine. Initially, a sample of SARS-CoV-2 from China was used to grow large quantities of the virus using vero cells. From then on, the viruses are soaked in beta-propiolactone, which deactivates them by binding to their genes, while leaving other viral particles intact. The resulting inactivated viruses are then mixed with the adjuvant aluminium hydroxide.

CoronaVac does not need to be frozen, and both the vaccine and raw material for formulating the new doses could be transported and refrigerated at 2–8 °C (36–46 °F), temperatures at which flu vaccines are kept. CoronaVac could remain stable for up to three years in storage, which might offer some advantage in vaccine distribution to regions where cold chains are not developed.

In November 2020, Brazil's Instituto Butantan began building a facility to manufacture 100 million doses of CoronaVac a year, with a target completion date in September 2021. On 10 December, São Paulo Governor João Doria said that in the interim, prior to the local manufacture of CoronaVac, Instituto Butantan aimed to fill and finish 1 million doses of the vaccine per day.

In April 2021, Sinovac said its third manufacturing plant for Coronavac was ready and had started manufacturing bulk vaccine ingredients, doubling its annual capacity to 2 billion doses.

In April 2021, Bio Farma of Indonesia had filled and finished 35 million doses of CoronaVac, but was facing some production delays because of diminished supply of bulk delivered CoronaVac from China.

In May 2021, Malaysian company Pharmaniaga obtained local approval for its fill and finish CoronaVac.

In May 2021, Turkey was provided a license to produce CoronaVac.

In May 2021, Hungary announced an agreement to fill and finish CoronaVac, with the goal to eventually manufacture it locally in a new plant in Debrecen.

In June 2021, Egypt announced that it would produce about 40 million doses by the end of that year. Distribution of the locally produced vaccine would begin by August and it would be used locally and sent to other African nations.

== History ==
=== Clinical trials ===
==== Phase I–II ====
In April 2020, CoronaVac began Phase I–II trials in China with 744 participants on adults over the age 18–59, and In May, CoronaVac began Phase I–II trials in China with 422 participants on elderly adults over the age 60 and above. Preliminary results indicate that neutralizing antibodies fell below the seropositive threshold 6 to 8 months after the first two doses, and that a third dose given 6 or more months after the second dose raised neutralizing antibody levels beyond that of an initial course consisting of 3 doses.

In the Phase II trial completed in July 2020 published in The Lancet, CoronaVac showed seroconversion of neutralising antibodies for 109 (92%) of 118 participants in the 3 μg group, 117 (98%) of 119 in the 6 μg group, after the days 0 and 14 schedule; whereas at day 28 after the days 0 and 28 schedule, seroconversion was seen in 114 (97%) of 117 in the 3 μg group, 118 (100%) of 118 in the 6 μg group. Phase II results for older adults published in The Lancet showed CoronaVac was safe and well tolerated in older adults, with neutralising antibody induced by a 3 μg dose similar to those of a 6 μg dose.

==== Phase III ====
It was phase III clinically trialled in Brazil, Chile, Indonesia, the Philippines, and Turkey and relies on traditional technology similar to other inactivated-virus COVID-19 vaccines, such as the Sinopharm BIBP vaccine, another Chinese vaccine, and Covaxin, an Indian vaccine. CoronaVac does not need to be frozen, and both the final product and the raw material for formulating CoronaVac can be transported refrigerated at 2–8 °C (36–46 °F), the temperatures at which flu vaccines are kept.

In July 2020, Sinovac began Phase III trials to evaluate efficacy and safety on 9,000 volunteer healthcare professionals in Brazil, collaborating with Butantan Institute. On 19 October, São Paulo Governor João Doria said the first results of the clinical study conducted in Brazil proved that among the vaccines being tested in the country, CoronaVac is the safest, the one with the best and most promising immunization rates. On 23 October, São Paulo increased the number of volunteers in the trial to 13,000.

Brazil briefly paused the trials on 10 November after the suicide of a volunteer before resuming them the next day. The suicide was unrelated to the vaccine trial.

In August, a trial was started in Chile run by Pontifical Catholic University of Chile which was expected to include 3,000 volunteers between the ages of 18 and 65.

In August, Sinovac began trials in Indonesia with Bio Farma in Bandung involving 1,620 volunteers.

In September, Turkey began trials with 13,000 volunteers on a two-dose 14-day interval. The monitoring process took place at 25 centers in 12 cities across the country.

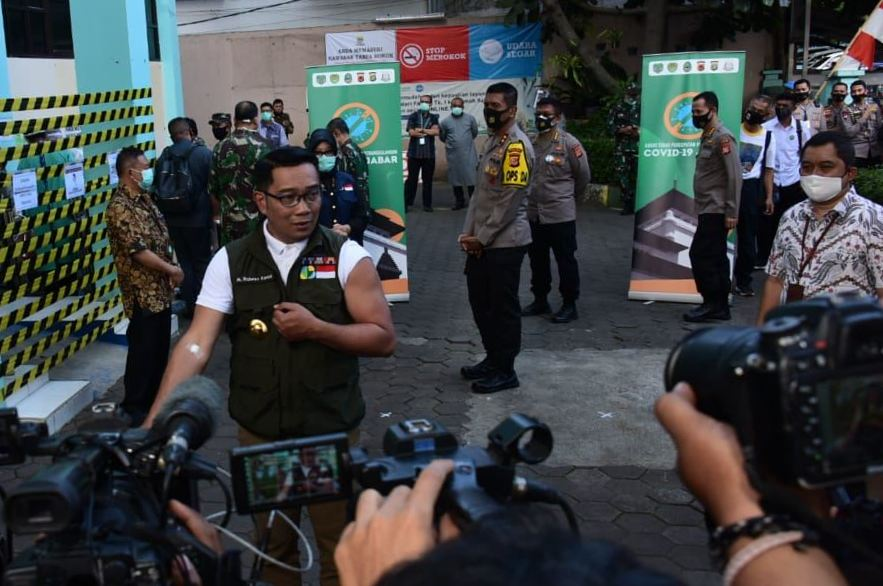
The Governor of West Java Ridwan Kamil participating in phase 3 trial of the Sinovac COVID-19 vaccine in Indonesia.

In October, Sinovac began trials in China involving 1,040 volunteers.

In April 2021, Sinovac began Phase II/III trials for the elderly aged 60–80 in the Philippines involving 352 volunteers.

==== Children and adolescents trials ====
In September 2020, Sinovac began Phase I–II trials in China on children and adolescents ages 3–17. In May 2021, Sinovac began Phase IIb trials in China with 500 participants for children and adolescents 3–17 years old. In June 2021, it was announced that the vaccine was safe and immunogenic in this age group.

In July, Sinovac began Phase III trials in Chile with 14,000 participants for children and adolescents and expand from 6 months to 17 years old.

==== Results of Phase III trials ====
Peer-reviewed Phase III results from Turkey showed an efficacy of 83.5% (95% CI, 65.4–92.1%). The final efficacy rate was based on 41 infections, 32 of which had received a placebo. The vaccine prevented hospitalization and severe illness in 100% of cases, with all six people who were hospitalized in the placebo group. The final results were based on 10,218 participants in the trials.

Phase III results from Brazil submitted to Lancet showed 50.7% efficacy at preventing symptomatic infections, 83.7% effective in preventing mild cases needing treatment. Efficacy against symptomatic infections increased to 62.3% with an interval of 21 days or more between the doses. A total of 12,396 volunteers participated in the study between 21 July and 16 December 2020. All participants received at least one dose of the vaccine or placebo. Of this total, 9,823 participants received both doses. Further detail published by Sinovac showed an efficacy 50.65% (95% CI, 35.66–62.15%) against all symptomatic cases, 83.70% (57.99–93.67%) against cases that require medical treatment, and 100.00% (56.37–100.00%) against severe, hospitalized and fatal cases. In the placebo group (N=4870), there were 168 COVID cases, 30 cases requiring medical attention, and 10 severe cases including one death. In the vaccine group (N=4953), there were 85 COVID cases, 5 cases requiring medical attention, and no severe cases or deaths.

On 1 April 2021, a preliminary report from a phase III clinical trial in Chile revealed that CoronaVac is safe and induces humoral and cell-mediated immunity in adults (18–59 years old) and the elderly (60 years or older) similar to previous phase II trials conducted in China with the same age groups and immunization schedule consisting of two doses with a 14-day interval. The side effects were mild and local, mainly limited to pain at the injection site, which was more common in adults. Seroconversion rates for adults 14–28 days after the second dose were 95.6% for the IgG specific against the S1-RBD (receptor binding domain of the S1 subunit of the spike protein) and 96% for neutralizing anti-S1-RBD IgG. For the elderly, seroconversion rates were 100% 14 days and 87.5% 28 days after the second dose for the S1-RBD specific IgG, 90% 14 days, and 100% 28 days after the second dose for neutralizing anti-S1-RBD IgG. As found in studies in animals, seroconversion rates for IgG specific against the N (nucleocapsid) protein were weak for both groups, although CoronaVac contains significant amounts of the N protein. A robust increase of T helper cells (CD4^{+}) secreting interferon gamma was detected 14 days after both doses in response to stimulation with peptides of the S protein and of other viral particles, but the response to S protein peptides was reduced in the elderly due to a natural reduction of activated CD4^{+} T cells in this age group, as found in studies of other vaccines. The immune response of cytotoxic T cell (CD8^{+}) was not as robust. The observed CD4^{+} T cell response is considered a balanced immune response capable of viral clearance and is similar to that observed in other COVID-19 vaccines, such as BNT162b1 and Convidecia.

Phase III results from Turkey, published in The Lancet, showed an efficacy of 84% based on 10,218 participants in the trials. Phase III results from Brazil previously showed 50.7% efficacy in preventing symptomatic infections and 83.7% effectiveness in preventing mild cases needing treatment. Efficacy against symptomatic infections increased to 62.3% with an interval of at least 21 days between the doses.

==== Variability in results ====
In early January 2021, Brazilian health officials announced that the vaccine had an efficacy of 78%. One week later, they revised this figure to 50.4%, stating that the revised figure now included "very mild" cases of COVID-19 among trial participants which were omitted in the earlier analysis. Ricardo Palácios, medical director of Brazil's Instituto Butantan, said Sinovac's relatively low efficacy rate of 50% was due to more rigorous standards for what counted as an infection among trial participants. The Institute split cases in six categories: asymptomatic, very mild, mild, two levels of moderate, and severe; the first two didn't require medical assistance. Possible explanations for lower efficacy rate included: trial was largely made up of frontline health care workers who were more exposed to the virus; two vaccine doses were given at shorter intervals (2 weeks); counting very mild cases; and the Gamma variant (lineage P.1), more transmissible and perhaps evaded immunity better, was circulating.

According to Instituto Butantan director Dimas Covas, the Brazilian group was considered more vulnerable to infection and exposure to higher viral loads. In Turkish and Indonesian Phase III trials, the composition of volunteers was similar to that of the general population.

==== Post phase III ====
A real-world study of tens of millions of Chileans who received CoronaVac found it to be 66% effective against symptomatic COVID-19, 88% effective against hospitalization, 90% effective against ICU admissions, and 86% effective against deaths. In Brazil, after 75% of the population in Serrana, São Paulo, received CoronaVac, preliminary results show deaths fell by 95%, hospitalizations by 86%, and symptomatic cases by 80%. In Indonesia, real-world data from 128,290 healthcare workers showed 94% protection against symptomatic infection by the vaccine, beating results in clinical trials.

==== Variants ====
On 10 March, Instituto Butantan Director Dimas Covas said CoronaVac was efficacious against three variants of COVID-19 in the country; Alpha (lineage B.1.1.7), Beta (lineage B.1.351), and lineage B.1.1.28 (identified in Brazil), from which Gamma and Zeta (lineages P.1 and P.2) descend.

Preliminary results from a large study of health care workers suggest one dose of CoronaVac is still about 50% effective against symptomatic COVID-19 in Manaus. In April 2021, it was reported that over 75% of new cases were being caused by the highly transmissible Gamma variant.

In June, Thailand's Public Health Ministry stated the vaccine had 71%-91% efficacy against infection by the Alpha strain.

In June 2021, Reuters reported that more than 350 Indonesian doctors and medical workers out of 5,000 in Kudus contracted the Delta strain despite being vaccinated with the CoronaVac, an infection rate of 7%. In response, Griffith University epidemiologist Dicky Budiman questioned the efficacy of CoronaVac against the variant but overall still recommended that people take the vaccine, expressing "confidence that to a certain degree Sinovac has effectiveness against the new variant". He stated that the situation was due to various factors, including a "lack of proper protective gear and the overall situation in Indonesia". The vast majority of those infected were protected from severe symptoms and recovered without hospitalization.

A Hong Kong 2022 study of the BA.2 Omicron variant comparing CoronaVac with BNT162b2 (Pfizer) found effectiveness of 32.4% and 41.4% (respectively) in preventing infections with two doses, and 41.6% versus 50.9% (respectively) in preventing infections with three doses. Another Hong Kong study of the BA.2 Omicron variant comparing CoronaVac with BNT162b2 for adults over age 60 found effectiveness of 69.9% versus 89.3% (respectively) in preventing severe disease or death with two doses, and 97.9% for both vaccines with three doses.

=== Authorizations ===
The World Health Organization (WHO) validated the Sinovac-CoronaVac COVID-19 vaccine for emergency use on 1 June 2021. The recommendation was given with limited evidence at the time of approval for groups other than healthy adults. The WHO Strategic Advisory Group of Experts expressed high level of confidence in the efficacy of the vaccine for adults, moderate confidence in the efficacy for older adults and individuals with comorbidities, moderate confidence in its safety for adults and low confidence in its safety for the elderly and individuals with comorbidities.

In late August 2020, China approved CoronaVac for emergency use to vaccinate high-risk groups such as medical staff. In early February, China approved CoronaVac for general use. On 5 June 2021, China approved CoronaVac for emergency use with children and adolescents for 3–17 years old.

In January 2021, Bolivia authorized use of CoronaVac.

In April, Panama approved emergency use of Coronavac.

On 4 May, the EMA's human medicines committee (CHMP) started a rolling review of CoronaVac.

In June, Bangladesh approved Coronavac for emergency use.

== Society and culture ==
=== Economics ===
As of 7 July 2021, CoronaVac is the most widely used COVID-19 vaccine in the world, with 943 million doses delivered globally. In July, Sinovac signed advanced purchase agreements with GAVI to supply COVAX with 50 million doses in the third quarter of 2021 and up to a total of 380 million doses by the first half of 2022.

==== Asia ====
In January, Azerbaijan launched its vaccination campaign with CoronaVac. It purchased 4 million doses from Turkey and 5 million doses from China.

In May, Armenia received 100,000 doses from China.

In February, Cambodia approved Coronavac for emergency use and started vaccinations in March. By July, the country had received 10.5 million doses.

In October, Saudi Arabia signed an agreement to distribute CoronaVac to 7,000 healthcare workers, after conducting Phase III trials with the Saudi Arabian National Guard.

In November, Turkey signed a contract to buy 50 million doses of CoronaVac. Turkey approved emergency use on 13 January and President Recep Tayyip Erdoğan received his first dose at Ankara City Hospital. In February, Turkey signed a deal for another 50 million doses for a total of 100 million doses. By March 10.7 million doses had been administered, and 852 of the 1.3 million people who had received both doses were later diagnosed with the disease. 53 were hospitalized, but none of those hospitalized were intubated or died.

In December, Hong Kong ordered 7.5 million doses of CoronaVac. The vaccination campaign with CoronaVac began on 26 February.

By December 2020, Indonesia had signed agreements for 140 million doses of CoronaVac. Indonesia approved emergency use authorization on 11 January and President Joko Widodo received the first shot of the vaccine. By June, Indonesia had received 118.7 million bulk doses.

In January, Malaysia ordered 12 million doses which was approved for emergency use in March. Science, Technology and Innovation Minister Khairy Jamaluddin received the first dose as part of the vaccination campaign.

In March, Kazakhstan ordered 3 million doses, of which 500,000 doses arrived in June and has been approved for use by the Ministry of Health.

In May, Oman received its first batch of the vaccine.

In April, Pakistan granted emergency use authorization for CoronaVac and received 14.5 million doses by July.

In January, the Philippines announced the country had secured 25 million doses. The vaccine was approved on 22 February but not for all health workers as it had lower efficacy when used with health workers compared to healthy individuals aged 18–59. The first 600,000 doses of CoronaVac arrived on 28 February, and the country had received 7.5 million doses by June.

Singapore signed advance purchase agreements for CoronaVac. In February, the first doses arrived and in June it was approved for use under the Special Access Route.

In May, Tajikistan's Ministry of Health announced it would receive 150,000 doses.

In February, Thailand approved emergency use and started its vaccination program on 27 February. As of June, Thailand had received 10.5 million doses.

In May 2021, Georgia began vaccinations with CoronaVac, for which it received 1 million doses by July.

In May 2021, Turkmenistan received a delivery of CoronaVac.

In May 2021, AKIPress reported Uzbekistan plans to use CoronaVac.

In October 2021, Singapore included CoronaVac in its National Vaccination Programme for people aged 18 and over who are ineligible for mRNA vaccines due to allergies or serious adverse reactions after the first dose.

==== Africa ====
In March, Benin received 203,000 doses of CoronaVac and started vaccinations on 29 March prioritizing healthcare workers, people over 60, and those with co-morbidities.

In April, Botswana received 200,000 doses of CoronaVac as a donation and purchased an additional 200,000 doses to be used in the vaccination program.

In March, Djibouti received 300,000 doses of CoronaVac.

In April, Egypt approved emergency use of CoronaVac.

In April, Guinea received 300,000 doses of CoronaVac which it had purchased.

In April, Libya received 150,000 doses of CoronaVac from Turkey.

In April, Somalia received 200,000 doses of CoronaVac.

In July, South Africa approved CoronaVac for emergency use, and was expected to receive 2.5 million doses shortly.

In April, Togo received 200,000 doses of CoronaVac.

In March, Tunisia's Ministry of Health approved marketing authorization for CoronaVac and the first 200,000 doses arrived on 25 March.

In March, Zimbabwe approved emergency use and the first 1 million doses arrived on 30 March.

==== Europe ====
In March, Albania launched its vaccination campaign using mainly CoronaVac, a week after securing 1 million doses from Turkey.

By June, Northern Cyprus received 190,000 doses donated by Turkey.

In March, Bosnia received 30,000 doses donated by Turkey.

In June, North Macedonia received 30,000 doses donated by Turkey and another 500,000 doses it purchased.

In March, Ukraine granted approval for use of CoronaVac. Ukrainian Pharmaceutical Company Lekhim has an agreement to deliver 5 million doses. 1.7 million doses had been delivered by June.

In April, Moldova purchased 400,000 doses of CoronaVac.

==== South America ====
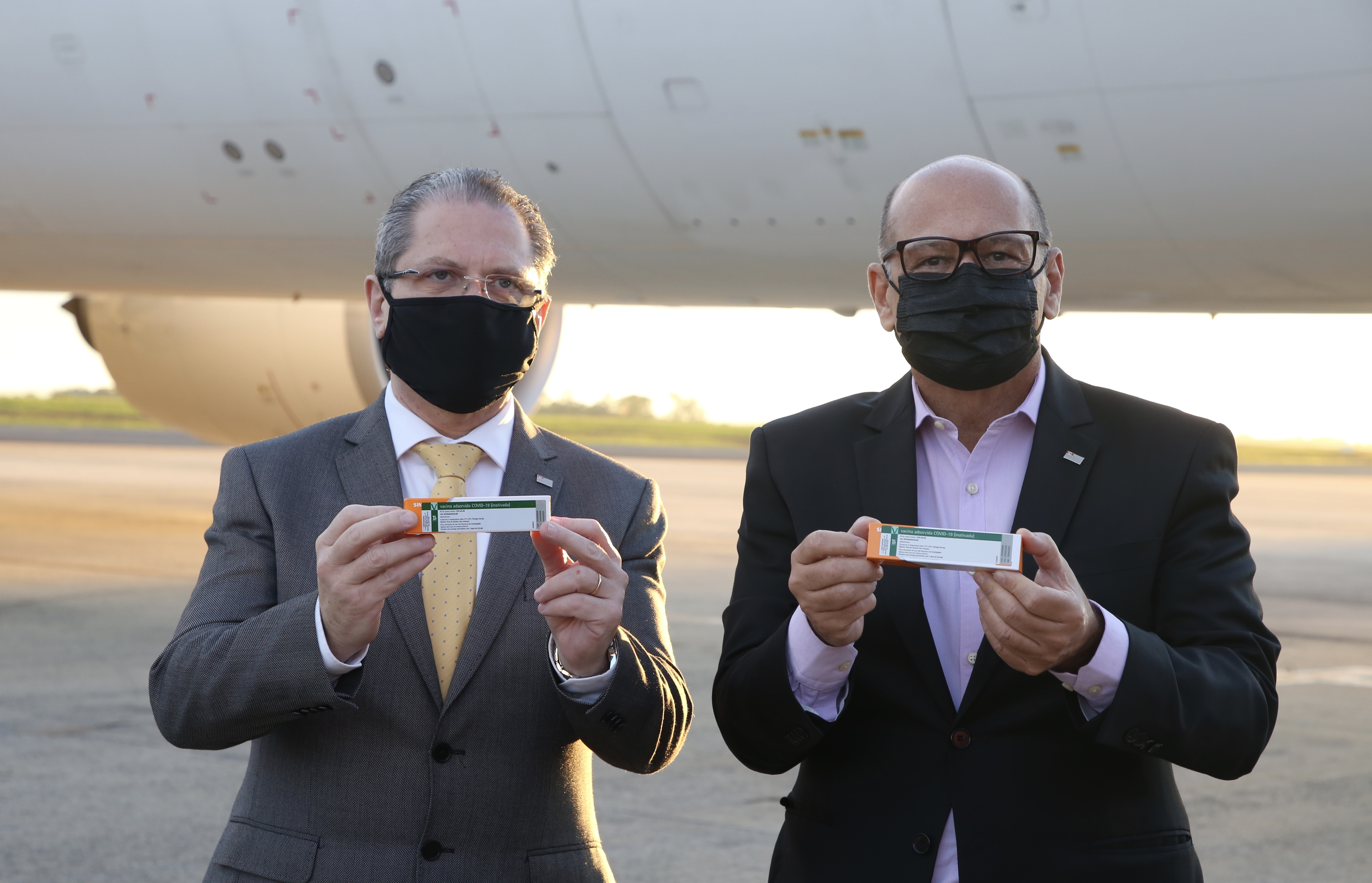
São Paulo State Secretary of Health Jean Gorinchteyn (left) and Instituto Butantan chairman Dimas Covas (right) holding single-dose prefilled syringes of CoronaVac, part of the fourth shipment of Sinovac-manufactured vaccine to arrive in Brazil

In Brazil, São Paulo governor João Doria signed a $90 million contract with Sinovac in September to receive the initial 46 million doses of CoronaVac. The price for CoronaVac was announced to be US$10.3 (about R$59). In January, Brazil announced it would obtain 100 million total doses. On 17 January, Brazil's health regulatory agency Anvisa approved emergency use of CoronaVac. In early February, Brazil said it intends to buy an additional 30 million doses on top of existing 100 million doses. A total of 39.7 million doses had been delivered by early April.

In October, Chile signed an agreement to purchase 20 million doses of CoronaVac which was approved for emergency use on 20 January. By early March, the country had received 10 million doses of CoronaVac and had vaccinated 4.1 million people.

In February, Colombia had purchased 5 million doses and was in talks for an additional 5 million doses, which had been approved for emergency use on 5 February.

In February, Ecuador signed a deal for 2 million doses which was approved for emergency use, with the first 1 million doses arrived in early April.

In March, Paraguay received a donation of 20,000 doses from Chile. Paraguay began vaccinations with CoronaVac on 10 March.

In January, Uruguay purchased 1.75 million doses, of which the first 192,000 doses arrived on 25 February and vaccinations started on 1 March.

==== North America ====
By June 2021, Dominican Republic had received 7.8 million doses of an order for 10 million doses.

In March 2021, El Salvador received 1 million doses of a total 2 million dose order for CoronaVac. The immunization campaign was initially focused on teachers, health professionals, firefighters, police, and military personnel. The first doses were provided to public school teachers beginning on March 30, with rollout expanding to private school teachers shortly after. Vaccination of the general public was planned for April 15, after the vaccination of the priority groups.

In February 2021, Mexico approved emergency use of CoronaVac. The country had ordered 20 million doses by March 2021, of which 7 million had been received by May.

==== Oceania ====
In March, Fiji said it would be receiving a donation of CoronaVac.

=== Controversies ===
==== China state media propaganda ====
In January 2021, as part of a misinformation campaign, multiple Chinese state and CCP-affiliated media outlets, including CGTN and the Global Times, have touted CoronaVac and Chinese vaccines as "relatively safer due to their mature technology". Pushing back against concerns of CoronaVac efficacy over the lack of transparency over releasing test results, China state media have raised doubts about the efficacy of the Pfizer–BioNTech vaccine, calling for an investigation into the deaths of elderly people in Norway and Germany after receiving the vaccine. According to Reuters, the reports made allegations of "deliberately downplaying the deaths" and "using propaganda power to promote the Pfizer vaccine and smearing Chinese vaccines".

According to a Ming Pao report published on 21 March 2022, of the 1,486 who died of COVID-19 after receiving at least one dose, 1,292 of them or 87%—had gotten the Sinovac vaccine. The Centre for Health Protection's Chuang Shuk-kwan said that the Ming Pao report was inaccurate and has defended CorovaVac, saying "The issue is not about which jab offers more protection. The most important thing is whether you get vaccinated." Earlier in February 2022, health authorities refused to disclose data on which COVID-19 vaccine had been taken by Omicron patients, claiming the information "was not readily available." Hong Kong government data showed CoronaVac to be the preferred vaccine among those aged 70 and over, in part because some elderly care homes only offer this vaccine. However, CoronaVac's limited effectiveness compared to the BioNTech vaccine, along with the zero-COVID strategy, have been regarded as factors behind Hong Kong's spiking cases as of March 2022.

==== Politicization ====
CoronaVac has been championed by the governor of São Paulo, João Doria. A political showdown began in October 2020, when Bolsonaro vetoed a deal between the Brazilian health ministry and the São Paulo government for the purchase of 46 million doses of the vaccine. After Instituto Butantan announced CoronaVac's efficacy rate, Bolsonaro mocked the vaccine's effectiveness against COVID-19.

In March 2021, the Paraná Pesquisas opinion polling institute found that the vaccines preferred by Brazilians are CoronaVac and the Oxford–AstraZeneca vaccine, chosen by 23.6% and 21.2% of Brazilians interviewed, respectively, against 11.3% of those who would prefer the Pfizer–BioNTech vaccine. During the pandemic parliamentary inquiry in Brazil, senators have expressed that anti-China rhetoric has contributed to delaying access to vaccines in Brazil.

==== Delays in releasing results ====
On 23 December 2020, researchers in Brazil said the vaccine was more than 50% effective, but withheld full results at Sinovac's request, raising questions about transparency as it was the third delay in releasing results from the trials. Scientists said the lack of transparency risked damaging CoronaVac's credibility.

==== Disinformation and influence operations ====
The #ChinaAngVirus disinformation campaign (transl. #ChinaIsTheVirus) was a covert Internet anti-vaccination propaganda and disinformation campaign conducted by the United States Department of Defense at the height of the COVID-19 pandemic from the spring of 2020 to the spring of 2021, to dissuade Filipino, Central Asian, and Middle Eastern citizens from receiving Sinovac Biotech's CoronaVac vaccine and from using other Chinese COVID-19 medical supplies. The propaganda campaign used at least 300 fake accounts on Twitter, Facebook, Instagram, and other social media websites meant to look like local internet users.

A 2025 Reuters report found that the Embassy of China in Manila hired a local marketing firm to conduct a covert "public opinion guidance" influence operation that included promoting CoronaVac in the country.
