= Sinopharm CNBG COVID-19 vaccine =

Vaccine against COVID-19

Vaccine description
- Target: SARS-CoV-2
- Vaccine type: Protein subunit

Clinical data
- Routes of administration: Intramuscular

Legal status
- Legal status: Full list of Sinopharm NVSI authorizations

Identifiers
- CAS Number: 2503126-65-4

Sinopharm NVSI COVID-19 vaccine, also known as mutI-tri-RBD or NVSI-06-08, is a COVID-19 vaccine developed by National Vaccine & Serum Institute (NVSI, 中生研究院), a subsidiary of CNBG of Sinopharm.

They claim to be the world's first "second generation broadly protective" recombination protein subunit vaccine, i.e. by combining three heterogeneous antigens into one single trimer RBD protein (突变集成三聚化RBD, mutI-tri-RBD). It's based on the original, and the Beta (K417N/E484K/N501Y) and Kappa (L452R/E484K) variants.
