= Sinopharm WIBP COVID-19 vaccine =

Vaccine against COVID-19

Vaccine description
- Target: SARS-CoV-2
- Vaccine type: Inactivated

Clinical data
- Other names: Zhongkangkewei (Chinese: 众康可维)
- Routes of administration: Intramuscular
- ATC code: None

Legal status
- Legal status: Full and emergency authorizations; Full list of Sinopharm WIBP authorizations

Identifiers
- CAS Number: 2699874-55-8
- DrugBank: DB15862

The Sinopharm WIBP COVID-19 vaccine, also known as WIBP-CorV, is one of two inactivated virus COVID-19 vaccines developed by Sinopharm. Peer-reviewed results show that the vaccine is 72.8% effective against symptomatic cases and 100% against severe cases (26 cases in vaccinated group vs. 95 cases in placebo group). The other inactivated virus COVID-19 vaccine developed by Sinopharm is the BIBP vaccine (BBIBP-CorV) which is comparably more successful. 1 billion doses are expected to be produced per year.

== Medical uses ==
The vaccine is given by intramuscular injection. The administered is 2 doses in 3 weeks.

=== Efficacy ===
In May 2021, peer-reviewed results published in JAMA of Phase III trials in United Arab Emirates and Bahrain showed that the vaccine is 72.8% effective against symptomatic cases and 100% against severe cases (26 cases in vaccinated group vs. 95 cases in placebo group). 12,743 people received the vaccine and 12,737 people received the placebo in these trials.

== Manufacturing ==
In June 2021, a new factory started production with the capacity to manufacture 1 billion doses annually.

== History ==
In April 2020, China approved clinical trials for a candidate COVID-19 vaccine developed by Sinopharm's Beijing Institute of Biological Products (BIBP) and the Wuhan Institute of Biological Products (WIBP). Both vaccines are chemically-inactivated whole virus vaccines for COVID-19.

On August 13, 2020, the Wuhan Institute of Biological Products published interim results of its Phase I (96 adults) and Phase II (224 adults) clinical studies. The report noted the vaccine had a low rate of adverse reactions and demonstrated immunogenicity, but longer-term assessment of safety and efficacy would require Phase III trials.

=== Clinical trials ===
In March 2021, Cayetano Heredia University running the BIBP and WIBP trials in Peru announced they were seeking to suspend and unblind participants in the WIBP trials for lower efficacy and offer the participants the BIBP vaccine instead, which was showing efficacy.

=== Authorizations ===
On February 25, 2021, China approved the vaccine for general use.

According to The New York Times, the vaccine is only approved for limited use in United Arab Emirates. On August 19, 2021, the Philippines approved the vaccine for emergency use authorization.
