= Sinopharm BIBP COVID-19 vaccine =

Vaccine against COVID-19

BBIBP-CorV
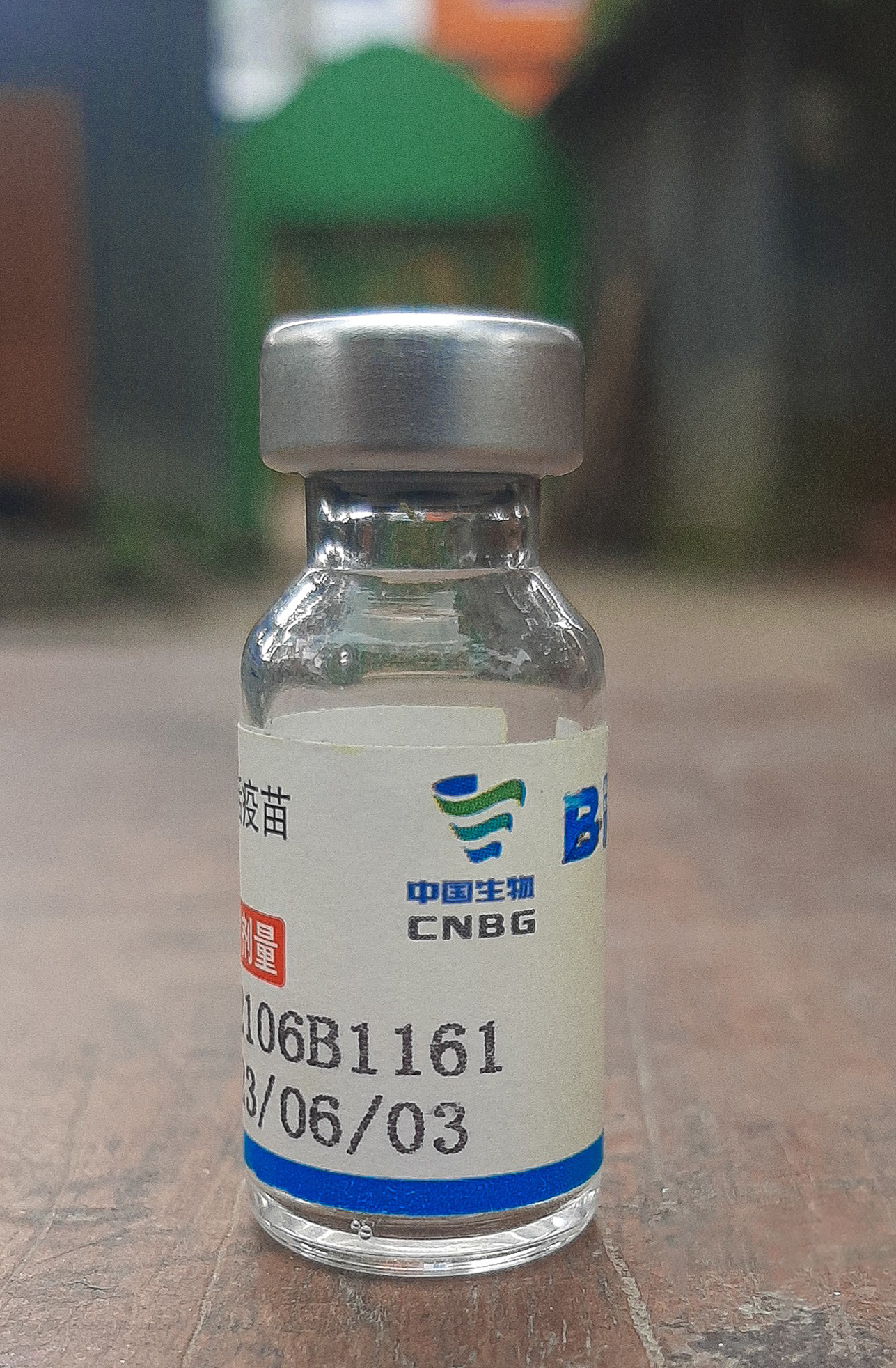
- A vial of the BBIBP-CorV COVID-19 vaccine

Vaccine description
- Target: SARS-CoV-2
- Vaccine type: Inactivated

Clinical data
- Other names: Zhong'aikewei (Chinese: 众爱可维), Hayat-Vax
- Routes of administration: Intramuscular
- ATC code: J07BN03 (WHO)

Legal status
- Legal status: BR: Emergency use (COVAX); Full list of Sinopharm BIBP authorizations

Identifiers
- CAS Number: 2503126-65-4
- DrugBank: DB15807

The Sinopharm BIBP COVID-19 vaccine, also known as BBIBP-CorV, the Sinopharm COVID-19 vaccine, or BIBP vaccine, is one of two whole inactivated virus COVID-19 vaccines developed by Sinopharm's Beijing Institute of Biological Products (sometimes written as Beijing Bio-Institute of Biological Products, resulting in the two different acronyms BBIBP and BIBP for the same vaccine). It completed Phase III trials in Argentina, Bahrain, Egypt, Morocco, Pakistan, Peru, and the United Arab Emirates (UAE) with over 60,000 participants. BBIBP-CorV shares similar technology with CoronaVac and Covaxin, other inactivated virus vaccines for COVID-19. Its product name is SARS-CoV-2 Vaccine (Vero Cell), not to be confused with the similar product name of CoronaVac.

Peer-reviewed results published in JAMA of Phase III trials in United Arab Emirates and Bahrain showed that the vaccine is 78.1% effective against symptomatic cases and 100% against severe cases (21 cases in vaccinated group vs. 95 cases in placebo group). In December 2020, the UAE previously announced interim results showing 86% efficacy.

While mRNA vaccines like the Pfizer–BioNTech COVID-19 vaccine and Moderna COVID-19 vaccine showed higher efficacy of over 90%, those present distribution challenges for some nations as they require deep-freeze facilities and trucks. The BIBP vaccine could be transported and stored at normal refrigerated temperatures.

The vaccine is being used in vaccination campaigns by certain countries in Asia, Africa, South America, and Europe. Sinopharm expects to produce one billion doses of the vaccine in 2021. By May, Sinopharm had supplied 200 million doses.

On 7 May 2021, the World Health Organization approved the BIBP vaccine for use in COVAX. Sinopharm has signed purchase agreements for 170 million doses from COVAX.

The similarly named Sinopharm WIBP COVID-19 vaccine is also an inactivated virus vaccine.

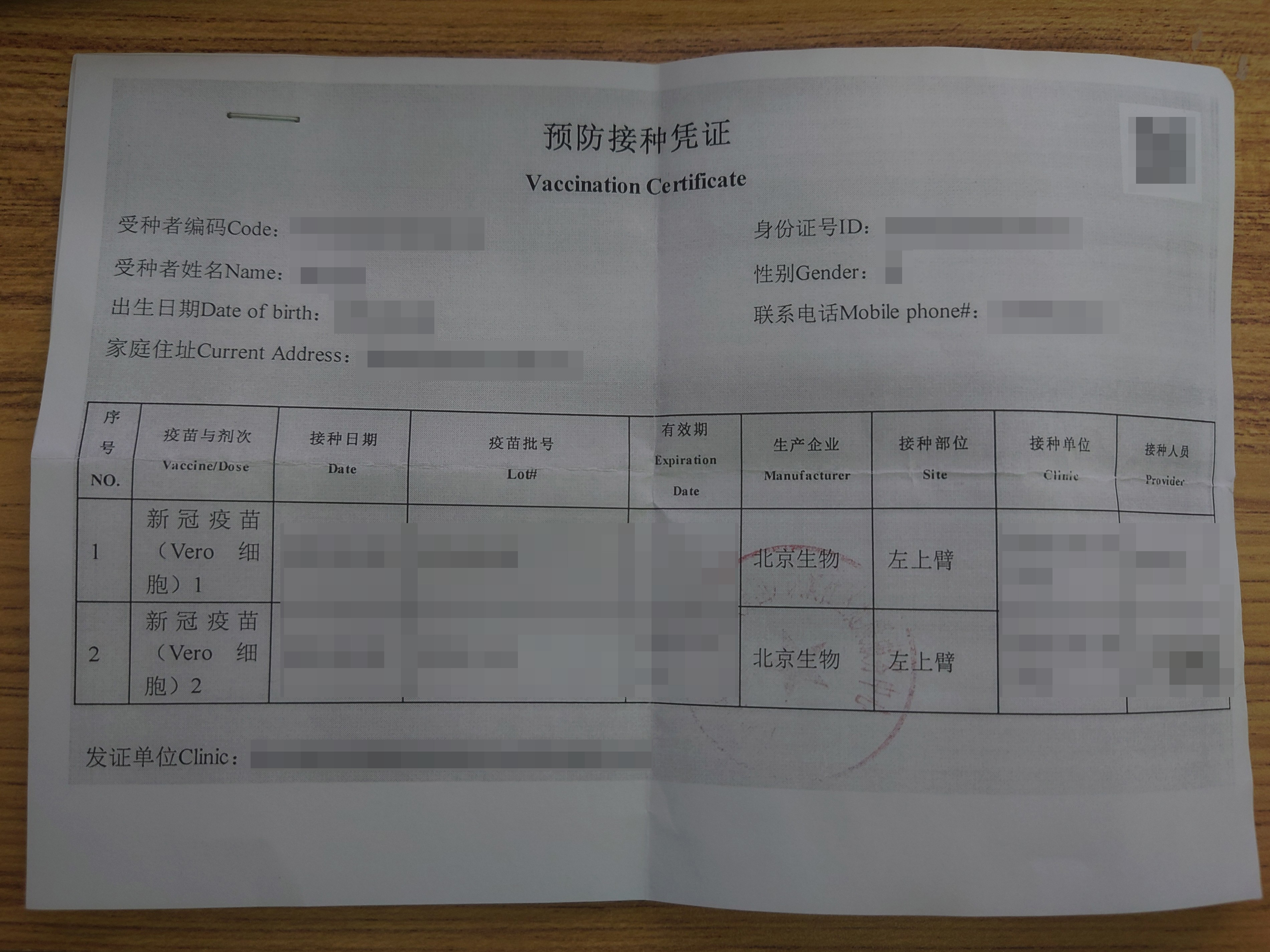
A vaccination certificate of BBIBP-CorV (Beijing Institute of Biological Products, Sinopharm).

== Medical uses ==
The vaccine is given by intramuscular injection into the deltoid muscle. The initial course consists of two doses, and there is no evidence that a third booster dose is needed. The World Health Organization (WHO) recommends an interval of 3 to 4 weeks between doses.

=== Effectiveness ===
A vaccine is generally considered effective if the estimate is ≥50% with a >30% lower limit of the 95% confidence interval. Effectiveness is generally expected to slowly decrease over time.

Real-world test-negative analysis in Bahrain (based on 14 days post 2nd dose) indicated a vaccine effectiveness of 90% (95% CI, 88–91%) for adults aged 18–59, and 91% (87–94%) for those 60 year old or older. While confident in its overall efficacy, WHO experts expressed very low confidence in their current ability to determine the safety of the BIBP vaccine for people with comorbidities, pregnant women, and the elderly as they were under-represented in the studies.

In April 2021, a study by the Abu Dhabi Public Health Centre found the vaccine was 93% effective in preventing hospitalization and 95% effective against admission to intensive care. The study found no deaths related to COVID-19 in patients who received both doses. It was unknown how many people were included in the research.

On 1 July, the Ministry of Health of Argentina reported the vaccine reduced deaths by 62% after the first dose and by 84% after the second dose.

On 22 July, Peru's National Institute of Health reported the vaccine reduced deaths by 94% after analyzing data from 361,000 people.

On 13 August, a study with 400,000 health workers in Peru from February to June 2021, during a wave mostly caused by the Lambda and Gamma variants, found a vaccine effectiveness of 50% (49–52%) against infection and 94% (91–96%) against death after two doses. With a single dose, the effectiveness was 17% (15–20%) against infections and 46% (30–59%) against death.

In June 2022, results from a non-randomized study of one million people in Bahrain, of whom 569,054 received the BIBP vaccine, found that the vaccine continued to reduce infection, hospitalization, and death when the Delta variant became dominant, though not as effectively as Pfizer–BioNTech, Oxford–AstraZeneca and Sputnik V.

Initial effectiveness by variant
Doses	Severity of illness	Delta	Alpha
1	Symptomatic	Not reported	Not reported
1	Hospitalization	Not reported	Not reported
2	Asymptomatic	Not reported	69% (67–70%) (Note: 22 January to 10 June 2021 in Hungary.)
2	Symptomatic	Not reported	Not reported
2	Hospitalization	Not reported	Not reported
2	Death	Not reported	88% (86–89%)

=== Efficacy ===
In December 2020, UAE's Ministry of Health and Prevention previously announced interim analysis showing the vaccine to have a 86% efficacy against COVID-19 infection and nearly 100% efficacy in preventing moderate and severe cases.

On 7 May 2021, the World Health Organization reported a vaccine efficacy of 79% (95% CI, 66–88%) against symptomatic disease and 79% (26–94%) against hospitalization.

In 26 May, peer-reviewed results published in JAMA of Phase III trials in United Arab Emirates and Bahrain showed the vaccine 74% (61–82%) effective against cases including asymptomatic and symptomatic infections, 78% (95% CI, 65–86%) effective against symptomatic cases, and nearly 100% against severe cases (0 cases in vaccinated group, 2 cases in placebo group). 12,726 people received the vaccine and 12,737 people received the placebo in these trials.

As of 1 July, six of the 71 COVID-19 deaths in Seychelles were among the fully vaccinated people. Only one of the six was fully vaccinated by the BIBP vaccine, the remaining five had been fully vaccinated by Covishield, which was mainly reserved for people aged 60 years or more.

==== Variants ====
In February, lab studies of twelve serum samples taken from recipients of BBBP-CorV and ZF2001 retained neutralizing activity against the Beta variant although with weaker activity than against the original virus. For the BIBP vaccine, geometric mean titers declined by 1.6-fold, from 110.9 to 70.9, which was less than antisera from mRNA vaccine recipients with a 6-folds decrease. Preliminary clinical data from Novavax and Johnson & Johnson also showed they were less effective in preventing COVID-19 in South Africa, where the new variant is widespread.

In June, a pre-print study with 282 recipients of the vaccine in Sri Lanka showed that:

- 95% seroconverted following 2 doses, a similar rate seen in natural infection, with significantly lower seroconversion for >60 year-olds (93%) compared to 20-39 year-olds (99%)
- 81% had ACE2 receptor blocking antibodies capable of naturalizing the virus at 6 weeks, with the antibody titres at a level also similar to natural infection
- the antibody levels against Delta and Beta were at similar levels seen in natural infection, although much lower against Alpha
- there was a 1.38-fold reduction in antibody titres against Delta compared to the original strain, in contrast with 10-fold reduction against Beta
- the vaccine also induced T cell and memory B cell responses, although at lower magnitudes than some other vaccines

== Manufacturing ==
As an inactivated vaccine like CoronaVac and Covaxin, the BIBP vaccine uses a more traditional technology that is similar to the inactivated polio vaccine. Initially, a sample of SARS-CoV-2 strain 19nCoV-CDC-Tan-HB02 (HB02) from China capable of rapid multiplication was chosen. Then, it was used to grow large quantities of the virus using vero cells. From then on, the viruses are soaked in beta-propiolactone, which deactivates them by binding to their genes, while leaving other viral particles intact. The resulting inactivated viruses are then mixed with the adjuvant aluminium hydroxide.

Sinopharm's Chairman Yang Xioyun has said the company could produce one billion doses in 2021.

In March 2021, Sinopharm and Abu Dhabi G42 announced plans to produce up to 200 million doses annually in the UAE at a new plant to become operational in 2021. The vaccine will be branded Hayat-Vax.

In December 2020, Egypt announced an agreement between Sinopharm and Egypt's VACSERA for the vaccine to be manufactured locally.

In March 2021, Serbia announced plans to produce 24 million doses of the BIBP vaccine annually starting in October.

In April 2021, Bangladesh approved local production of the BIBP vaccine.

In July 2021, Morocco's Société Thérapeutique Marocaine announced it would produce 5 million doses a month.

In November 2021, Sinopharm announced that it will build a sterile bottling plant in Singapore to enhance the distribution of the vaccine.

== History ==
=== Clinical trials ===
==== Phases i and II ====
In April 2020, China approved clinical trials for a candidate COVID-19 vaccine developed by Sinopharm's Beijing Institute of Biological Products (BIBP) and the Wuhan Institute of Biological Products (WIBP). Both vaccines are chemically inactivated whole virus vaccines for COVID-19.

On 15 October, the Beijing Institute of Biological Products published results of its Phase I (192 adults) and Phase II (448 adults) clinical studies for the BIBP vaccine, showing it to be safe and well-tolerated at all tested doses in two age groups. Antibodies were elicited against SARS-CoV-2 in all vaccine recipients on day 42. These trials included individuals older than 60.

The vaccine may have characteristics favorable for vaccinating people in the developing world. While mRNA vaccines, such as the Pfizer–BioNTech COVID-19 vaccine and Moderna COVID-19 vaccine showed higher efficacy of +90%, mRNA vaccines present distribution challenges for some nations, as some may require deep-freeze facilities and trucks. By contrast, the BIBP vaccine can be transported and stored at normal refrigeration temperatures. While Pfizer and Moderna are among developers relying on novel mRNA technology, manufacturers have decades of experience with the inactivated virus technology Sinopharm is using.

==== Phase III ====
In July 2020, Sinopharm began trials with 31,000 volunteers in the UAE in collaboration with G42 Healthcare, an Abu Dhabi-based company. In June 2021, Sinopharm began Phase III trials for children and adolescents aged 3–17 with 1,800 volunteers.

In September 2020, Sinopharm began trials in Casablanca and Rabat on 600 people. In September, Egypt started trials with 6,000 people.

In August, Sinopharm began trials in Bahrain with 6,000 people, later increased to 7,700 people. Also in August, Jordan began trials with 500 people.

In September, Peru began trials with 6,000 people which later expanded to 12,000 people. On 26 January, a volunteer in the placebo group of the trials had died from COVID-19 related pneumonia.

In September, Argentina began trials with 3,000 people.

In Pakistan, University of Karachi conducted a trial with 3,000 volunteers.

=== Authorizations ===
In China, Sinopharm obtained an EUA in July 2020. On 30 December 2020, China's National Medical Products Administration approved the BIBP vaccine for general use. In July 2021, China approved the EUA for children and adolescents aged 3–17.

In September 2020, UAE approved for emergency use authorization. In December 2020, UAE approved for full authorization. In August 2021, UAE approved the EUA for children and adolescents aged 3–17.

On 3 November 2020, Bahrain granted emergency use authorization for frontline workers. In December 2020, Bahrain approved the vaccine.

On 7 May 2021, the World Health Organization added the vaccine to the list of vaccines authorized for emergency use for COVID-19 Vaccines Global Access (COVAX).

In May 2021, Zambia approved use of the vaccine.

In June 2021, Philippines approved the BIBP vaccine for emergency use.

On 5 May 2021, EMA's human medicines committee (CHMP) has started a rolling review of the vaccine. The EU applicant for this medicine is the Italian company Life'On S.r.l.

== Society and culture ==
=== Economics ===
By May, Sinopharm had supplied 200 million doses across all countries. In July, Sinopharm signed advanced purchase agreements with GAVI to supply COVAX 60 million doses in the third quarter of 2021 and up to a total of 170 million doses by the first half of 2022.

==== Asia ====
On 10 June, Afghanistan received a donation of 700,000 doses of the BIBP vaccine from China.

In July, Armenia approved the purchase of doses of the BIBP vaccine.

In April 2021, Bangladesh approved emergency use and had received 7 million doses by August. The country will purchase 60 million doses.

In February 2021, Brunei received the first batch of the vaccine donated by China, which has been approved for emergency use.

In February 2021, Cambodia granted emergency use authorization and started the vaccination campaign on 10 February. By July the country had received 5.2 million doses.

In April 2021, Indonesia approved emergency use. In May, a donation of 500,000 doses from the UAE arrived. By July, 7.5 million out of 15 million doses had arrived for a private vaccination program called "Gotong Royong", where companies could arrange a free COVID-19 vaccine rollout for their employees.

In February 2021, Iran approved emergency use and received 650,000 doses by 15 April of the same year, including 400,000 dose donation from Red Cross Society of China. Spokesperson of the Food and Drug Administration (Iran): What is offered and consumed from Sinopharm vaccine in Iran is its main platform and is licensed for emergency use by the World Health Organization.

In January 2021, Iraq approved emergency use. On 2 March, the first 50,000 dose arrived as a donation from China, with the Health Ministry indicating intention to purchase further 2 million doses.

In January 2021, Jordan approved emergency use, By July 1.37 million people had received their first dose and 833,000 people had received their second.

In April 2021, Kazakhstan approved emergency use of the vaccine, for which it had ordered 1 million doses.

In March 2021, Kyrgyzstan received a donation of 150,000 doses from China and began vaccinations on 29 March. The country later purchased 1.25 million doses which arrived in August.

In January 2021, Laos began vaccinating healthcare workers in Vientiane and received another 300,000 doses in early February.

In April 2021, Lebanon received a donation of 90,000 doses from China after granting emergency use authorization on 2 March.

In February 2021, Macau received the first 100,000 doses of 400,000 doses.

In March 2021, Maldives granted emergency approval for use. 100,000 doses were received on 25 March out of a total of 200,000 Chinese-donated doses.

By May 2021, Mongolia had received 4 million doses, with 300,000 doses as a donation from China. On 10 March, Governor of Ulaanbaatar D. Sumiyabazar and Deputy Prime Minister S. Amarsaikhan received the first doses.

In February 2021, Nepal approved the vaccine for emergency use. On 12 July, AP reported that China had donated 1.8 million doses, and was selling 4 million doses to Nepal.

In January 2021, Pakistan approved the vaccine for emergency use and began a vaccination campaign on 2 February. The country has purchased up to 23 million doses and received 6 million doses by July, including 1 million doses as a donation from China.

In March 2021, Palestine received 100,000 doses donated by China.

In April 2021, Philippines president Rodrigo Duterte received the vaccine after the food and drug regulator approved compassionate use of 10,000 doses for his security team.

In July 2021, Singapore began importing the vaccine under the Special Access Route framework.

In April 2021, Syria received 150,000 dose donated by China.

In March 2021, Sri Lanka approved emergency use. The country ordered 14 million doses on top of 1.1 million doses previously donated by China.

In April 2021, Turkmenistan began vaccinating school teachers and medical personnel with the Sinopharm vaccine.

On 14 September 2020, the United Arab Emirates approved the vaccine for front-line workers following interim Phase III trials. In December, the country registered the BIBP vaccine after it reviewed the results of the interim analysis. In March, a small number of people who have reduced immunity against diseases, chronic illnesses, or belong to high-risk groups have been given a third booster dose. In May, due to concerns about effectiveness, Bahrain planned to give a third booster dose to some groups at risk, and the United Arab Emirates extended its third booster dose to anyone who had received the second dose more than six months ago.

In June 2021, Thailand received one million doses.

In June 2021, Vietnam received a donation of 500,000 doses from China and later licensed importing of 5 million more doses.

On 11 August 2021, Philippines received 100,000 doses from United Arab Emirates, also will received 1,000,000 doses from China on 21 August.

==== Africa ====
In February, Algeria received a donation of 200,000 doses from China.

In March, Angola received a donation of 200,000 doses from China.

In April, Cameroon took delivery of 200,000 donated doses from China.

In January, Egypt approved use of the vaccine and had purchased 20 million doses, of which 1.5 million had arrived by April. President Abdel Fattah el-Sisi announced a vaccination campaign starting 24 January.

In March, Ethiopia received a donation of 300,000 doses from China.

In February, Equatorial Guinea received a Chinese donation of 100,000 doses which arrived on 10 February. The country began vaccinations on 15 February.

In March, Gabon received a Chinese donation of 100,000 doses which was the second vaccine approved for use in the country.

In May, Kenya announced plans to buy the vaccine.

In August, Libya received 2 million doses of the vaccine.

Morocco has ordered 40.5 million doses, of which 8.5 million had been delivered by May. Morocco had granted emergency use approval on 23 January.

In March, Mauritania received a donation of 50,000 doses from China and started its vaccination campaign on 26 March.

In April, Mauritius received a donation of 100,000 doses from China and ordered an additional 500,000 doses.

In February, Mozambique received a donation of 200,000 doses from China and planned to start vaccinations on 8 March.

In March, Namibia received a donation of 100,000 doses from China and announced the start of vaccinations in the Khomas and Erongo regions.

In March, Niger received a donation of 400,000 doses from China and began vaccinations on 27 March.

In February, Senegal received 200,000 doses that it purchased and began vaccinating health workers on 22 February.

In February, Sierra Leone received a donation of 200,000 doses from China. It was approved for emergency use and vaccinations began on 15 March.

In January, Seychelles began administering vaccinations with 50,000 doses it had received as a gift from the UAE.

In April, Somalia received a donation of 200,000 doses from China and started vaccinations with the vaccine on 14 April.

In March, Sudan received a donation of 250,000 doses from China.

In March, Republic of the Congo received 100,000 Chinese-donated doses with vaccinations prioritizing the medically vulnerable and those over 50.

In February, Zimbabwe purchased 600,000 doses on top of 200,000 doses donated by China, and started vaccinations on 18 February. Zimbabwe purchased an additional 1.2 million doses.

==== Europe ====
In February, Belarus received a donation of 100,000 doses from China and began using the vaccine on 15 March.

In July, Bosnia and Herzegovina ordered 500,000 doses.

In May, Georgia began vaccinations with the BIBP vaccine and received 1 million doses by July.

In January, Hungary became first member of the European Union to approve the BIBP vaccine, signing a deal for 5 million doses. Prime Minister Viktor Orbán was vaccinated with the BIBP vaccine on 28 February. 5.2 million doses were delivered to Hungary by May, fulfilling the contract.

In March, Moldova received 2,000 doses donated by the UAE which will be used to vaccinate doctors starting on 22 March.

In May, Montenegro received 200,000 doses, which was used to launch the vaccination campaign starting 4 May.

In April, North Macedonia received the first 200,000 of 800,000 doses which arrived from Serbia which was used in the vaccination campaign starting 4 May.

On 19 January, Serbia started vaccinations with the BIBP vaccine and was the first country in Europe to approve the vaccine. By April, Serbia has received 2.5 million doses. In March, Serbia had signed an agreement for an additional 2 million doses.

==== North america ====
In February, the Dominican Republic ordered 768,000 doses of the BIBP vaccine.

In March, Dominica received 20,000 donated doses of the BIBP vaccine from China which it began using in its vaccination campaign on 4 March.

In March, Mexico announced it would order 12 million doses of the BIBP vaccine pending approval by its health regulator, which was granted in August.

In May, Trinidad and Tobago received a donation of 100,000 doses from China. Another 200,000 and 800,000 doses were purchased and arrived 14 June and 13 July, respectively; bringing total doses of the BIBP vaccine received to 1.1 million.

In April, Barbados announced it would receive 30,000 doses of Chinese donated the BIBP vaccine, according to Prime Minister Mia Mottley.

==== Oceania ====
In April, Solomon Islands received a donation of 50,000 doses from China.

In May, Papua New Guinea approved use of 200,000 Chinese donated doses, which arrived on 1 July.

==== South america ====
In February, Argentina authorized emergency use of the BIBP vaccine. Eligibility was expanded to include people older than 60 on 25 March. By 4 June million doses had arrived and 6 million more were ordered.

In February, Bolivia started its vaccination campaign with the BIBP vaccine. In June, Bolivia purchased 6 million doses in addition to 2.7 million doses it had already received.

In March, Guyana received a donation of 20,000 doses from China and later purchased another 100,000 doses. Vaccinations started with elderly and healthcare workers.

In January, Peru purchased 38 million doses of the BIBP vaccine. Peru granted emergency approval on 27 January and started vaccinations on 9 February.

In March, Venezuela granted approval for the vaccine and received a donation of 500,000 doses from China on 2 March.

=== Controversies ===
In February 2021, it was revealed that former Peruvian President Martín Vizcarra and other senior politicians were vaccinated in November 2020 before the vaccines were made available to health professionals and the public. They were vaccinated with extra doses that were brought in for the Phase III trials being conducted by Cayetano Heredia University in Lima with 12,000 volunteers.

In May 2021, Philippine President Rodrigo Duterte apologized for taking the BIBP vaccine which was not approved at the time. In response, Duterte said China should in the future only send CoronaVac, a separate vaccine which was approved in the Philippines at the time. Duterte said he only got the vaccine under a compassionate use clause, on recommendation from his doctor to get vaccinated. Later in June, the BIBP vaccine was approved for emergency use.
