= COVID-19 vaccination in Malaysia =

Plan to immunize against COVID-19

- The immunisation programme is among the initiatives by the Malaysian Government to curb the spread of COVID-19 infections in the country
- Date: 24 February 2021 –10 January 2022
- Location: Malaysia
- Theme: "Lindung Diri, Lindung Semua"
- Cause: COVID-19 pandemic in Malaysia
- Target: To be fully protected against COVID-19 and transition the country from pandemic to endemic stage
- Organised by: Ministry of Health and the Special Committee for Ensuring Access to COVID-19 Vaccine Supply (JKJAV)
- Participants: As of 10 January 2022: 26,027,402 have received the first dose of a two-dose vaccine or a single-dose vaccine; 25,653,398 have received the second dose of a two-dose vaccine or a single-dose vaccine
- Outcome: As of 10 January 2022: 79.7% have received the first dose of a two-dose vaccine or a single-dose vaccine; 78.6% have received the second dose of a two-dose vaccine or a single-dose vaccine
- Website: KKMNOW

The National COVID-19 Immunisation Programme (Malay: Program Imunisasi COVID-19 Kebangsaan), abbreviated as NIP or PICK, was a national vaccination campaign implemented by the Malaysian government to curb the spread of COVID-19 and to end the COVID-19 pandemic in Malaysia by achieving the highest possible immunisation rate among its citizens and non-citizens residing in the country. It was the largest immunisation programme in the history of Malaysia and was administered by the Special Committee for Ensuring Access to COVID-19 Vaccine Supply (JKJAV) starting in early 2021.

Although it ran smoothly for the most part, the programme faced numerous controversies and issues. These included a slow vaccine rollout due to a lack of vaccine supplies, although the Malaysian government had purchased more than enough for the population. There were also concerns about poor prioritization of vaccine recipients, logistical problems with the MySejahtera's digital vaccination appointment and certificate system, misinformation about vaccines, outbreaks, overcrowding at vaccination centres, and reports of poor treatment of foreign workers by volunteers and authorities. Videos of recipients receiving empty shots also surfaced, which the government attributed to human error caused by the fatigue of vaccinators. Additionally, there were unverified rumours of vaccine spots being sold by volunteers.

A whole-of-government and whole-of-society approach was adopted to assist the programme, involving several ministries and government agencies, state governments, non-governmental organisations (NGOs), the private sector, and members of the community to ensure that the programme achieved its target. Khairy Jamaluddin, who was also Malaysia's Science, Technology and Innovation Minister (MOSTI), was appointed as the Coordinating Minister for the National COVID-19 Immunisation Programme after being approved by the Malaysian Cabinet. He served in this role until his resignation on 16 August 2021.

The immunisation programme was implemented in phases from 24 February 2021 to February 2022, starting with Phase 1, which targeted healthcare workers and frontliners. Then Prime Minister Muhyiddin Yassin became the first individual in Malaysia to receive the Pfizer–BioNTech COVID-19 vaccine, in a broadcast that was aired live nationwide. As of the third week of September 2021, Malaysia averaged about 244,588 doses administered each day. At that rate, it was estimated that it would take an additional 27 days to administer enough doses for another 10% of the population.

Vaccines administered per pharmaceutical company as of 16 June 2021
1. Pfizer–BioNTech: 22.4 million (65.0%)
2. CoronaVac: 6.2 million (19.4%)
3. Oxford–AstraZeneca: 3.2 million (10.6%)
4. Not Identified: (5.00%)
Total number of people who have received COVID-19 vaccinations in Malaysia as of 16 December 2021
1. Population who have received only one dose of a two-dose vaccine: 411,463 (1.30%)
2. Population who are fully vaccinated with two vaccine doses: 25,529,153 (78.2%)
3. Unvaccinated population: 7,317,045 (20.5%)

According to the State of Mobile 2022 report, Malaysia's MySejahtera app ranked first in the world for install penetration rate and open rate among the Top COVID-19 Apps by Downloads Worldwide in 2021.

== Committees in charge ==
=== The Special Committee for Ensuring Access to COVID-19 Vaccine Supply ===
The Special Committee for Ensuring Access to COVID-19 Vaccine Supply, also known as the Special Committee on COVID-19 Vaccine Supply (Malay: Jawatankuasa Khas Jaminan Akses Bekalan Vaksin COVID-19; abbreviation: JKJAV), was a government body established to ensure the procurement of COVID-19 vaccine supplies for the country proceeded smoothly and orderly. It was co-chaired by the Malaysian Ministry of Health and the Ministry of Science, Technology and Innovation. The members of the committee included representatives from the Ministry of Finance Malaysia, Ministry of International Trade and Industry, Ministry of Foreign Affairs, Ministry of Home Affairs, Ministry of Communications and Multimedia, National Security Council (MKN), Attorney General's Chambers and the Prime Minister's Special Advisor on Public Health, as outlined in the governance structure for the national vaccination programme.

=== COVID-19 Immunisation Task Force ===
The COVID-19 Immunisation Task Force, or CITF (Malay: Jawatankuasa Petugas Khas Imunisasi COVID-19), was a committee established based on a decision made during a cabinet meeting held on 20 January 2021 by the Government of Malaysia to ensure that the distribution of vaccines was done flawlessly. Initially led by Khairy Jamaluddin, who was the Coordinating Minister for the National COVID-19 Immunisation Programme, it acted as the coordinating committee for the monitoring framework as well as the overall strategy to support the implementation of the National COVID-19 Immunisation Programme (PICK). The main tasks of the CITF were to plan, implement, and monitor the supply and distribution of vaccines; manage vaccination enrollment; prepare vaccine storage centres and vaccination centres; report on vaccination key performance indicators (KPIs); and handle risk management throughout the implementation of the immunisation programme.

=== COVID-19 Immunisation Task Force–Adolescent ===
On 15 September 2021, the COVID-19 Immunisation Task Force-Adolescent (CITF-A) was formed under the Ministry of Health to achieve full vaccination for 80% of Malaysians aged 12 to 17 years before the reopening of schools. CITF-A, chaired by Deputy Health Minister Noor Azmi Ghazali, was tasked with overseeing the National COVID-19 Immunisation Programme for Adolescents (PICK Adolescents), which was conducted through a scheduled walk-in process starting from 23 September 2021 onwards. The initiative also targeted students in the private education sector, adolescents in protection and rehabilitation programs, as well as refugee communities, the homeless, and non-citizens in Malaysia.

== Vaccines on order ==
Vaccine	Type	Via vaccine manufacturer	Via COVAX Facility	Approval	Deployment
Pfizer/BioNTech (Note: Allowed to be purchased by private hospitals and state governments in Malaysia)	mRNA	44.8 million	—	Conditional	Yes
Oxford/AstraZeneca (Note: Allowed to be purchased by private hospitals and state governments in Malaysia)	Viral vector	12.8 million	1.39 million	Conditional	Yes
Sinovac (Note: Allowed to be purchased by private hospitals and state governments in Malaysia)	Inactivated	12.4 million	—	Conditional	Yes
CanSinoBIO	Viral vector	3.5 million	—	Conditional	Yes
Janssen (Note: Purchased via COVAX Facility) (Note: Allowed to be purchased by private hospitals and state governments in Malaysia)	Viral vector	—	N/A	Conditional	No
Sputnik V	Viral vector	6.4 million	—	Pending	No
Novavax (Note: Purchased via COVAX Facility) (Note: Allowed to be purchased by private hospitals and state governments in Malaysia)	Subunit	—	N/A	Pending	No

== Vaccines in trial stage ==
Vaccine candidates, developers and sponsors	Type (technology)	Phase I	Phase II	Phase III	Ref
ZF2001; Anhui Zhifei Longcom and Chinese Academy of Sciences	Subunit	Completed	Completed	Completed	
Chinese Academy of Medical Sciences COVID-19 vaccine Chinese Academy of Medical Sciences	Inactivated	Completed	Completed	In progress	
KCONVAC; Shenzhen Kangtai Biological Products	Inactivated	Completed	Completed	In progress	
Unnamed; Universiti Putra Malaysia and Institute of Medical Research Malaysia	mRNA	Preclinical	N/A	N/A	

== Phases of the immunisation program ==
Flow	Target group	Estimated number	Duration
Phase 1	Healthcare workers and frontliners, including essential services personnel, defence personnel, and security personnel.	500,000+ individuals	26 February 2021 – April 2021
Phase 2	High-risk groups, including individuals with disabilities, senior citizens, and people with comorbidities.	9.4 million+ individuals	April – August 2021
Phase 3	Adults aged 18 and above, including citizens and non-citizens.	13.7 million+ individuals	May 2021 – February 2022
Phase 4	Workers in critical industries, including food, manufacturing, construction, retail, plantation, and hospitality.	7 million+ individuals	14 June 2021 onwards
Phase 5	Adolescents aged 12 to 17 with underlying medical conditions.	3.2 million+ individuals	8 September 2021 onwards
Phase 5	Adolescents aged 12 to 17 without medical conditions, based on age de-escalation.	3.2 million+ individuals	20 September – present

== History ==
=== 2020 ===
In mid-March 2020, Malaysian Vaccines and Pharmaceuticals (MVP) Sdn Bhd reportedly pleaded for cooperation and support from the federal government, with its executive director claiming that their company faced multiple postponed meetings in an attempt to meet the health minister to request a sample from the Institute of Medical Research (IMR) of Malaysia. The IMR was set to begin testing existing local vaccines in collaboration with the MVP and the University of Malaya's Tropical Infectious Diseases Research and Education Centre (TIDREC) by 25 March. The local vaccine testing will be conducted in UM's TIDREC laboratory, which is one of Malaysia's modular biosafety level 3 (BSL3) facilities previously used to study highly pathogenic agents such as MERS coronavirus and Nipah virus with the vaccines to be firstly tested on the infectious bronchitis virus (IBV), which is an avian coronavirus, as previous research shows that the IBV in poultry has high genetic similarity with SARS-CoV-2.

On 6 October, the engineering company Bintai Kinden entered into a distribution and licensing agreement (DLA) with the American–based firm Generex Biotechnology Corp and its subsidiary NuGenerex Immuno-Oncology Inc to distribute their COVID-19 vaccine in Malaysia through its subsidiary Bintai Healthcare. The company will also have the first right of refusal to commercially exploit the vaccine within Australia, New Zealand and the global halal market.

On 18 November, the Minister of Science, Technology and Innovation Khairy Jamaluddin signed an agreement with Chinese Science and Technology Minister Wang Zhigang for Malaysia to be given priority access to COVID-19 vaccines developed in China.

On 19 December, Health Minister Adham Baba confirmed that the Malaysian Government would be concluding an agreement with British pharmaceutical company AstraZeneca to purchase COVID-19 vaccines on 21 December 2020. This is the third agreement that the Malaysian Government had concluded with vaccine suppliers including COVAX and Pfizer to address the country's vaccine needs.

On 22 December, the Malaysian Government signed an agreement with AstraZeneca to obtain an additional 6.4 million doses of COVID-19 vaccines, which account for 10% of the country's vaccine supply. Prime Minister Muhyiddin confirmed that Malaysia had secured 40% of its vaccine supply through joint agreements with COVAX, Pfizer, and AstraZeneca.

=== 2021 ===
==== January ====
On 11 January 2021, the Health Ministry ordered an additional 12.2 million doses of the Pfizer–BioNTech COVID-19 vaccine in response to rising cases and the tightening of lockdown measures.

On 26 January, the Health Ministry signed an agreement with local pharmaceutical companies Pharmaniaga Berhad and Duopharma to obtain 18.4 million doses of COVID-19 vaccines from China and Russia for distribution in Malaysia.

On 27 January, Health Minister Dr. Adham Baba confirmed that launch of Malaysia's first COVID-19 vaccine trial. This vaccine trial involves the Phase 3 clinical trial of the COVID-19 vaccine developed by the Chinese Academy of Medical Sciences' Institute of Medical Biology.

==== February ====
On 2 February, the Director-General of Health Noor Hisham Abdullah announced that Malaysia would receive its first batch of the Pfizer–BioNTech COVID-19 vaccine on 26 February 2021, which will be distributed nationwide over a period of two weeks.

On 4 February, minister of MOSTI, Khairy Jamaluddin was appointed as the Coordinating Minister for National COVID-19 Immunisation Programme who led the Special Task Force to manage the implementation of the vaccination program.

On 11 February, the Special Committee on Ensuring Access to COVID-19 Vaccine Supply announced that COVID-19 vaccines would be distributed freely to both Malaysians and foreigners residing in Malaysia. However, Malaysian nationals will receive priority.

On 16 February, the Minister of Science, Technology and Innovation Khairy Jamaluddin confirmed that a MASKargo plane will transport the first shipment of Pfizer-BioNTech vaccines to Malaysia on 21 February.

On 23 February, Coordinating Minister for National COVID-19 Immunisation Programme Khairy Jamaluddin confirmed that it would receive its second batch of 182,520 doses of Pfizer-BioNTech vaccines the following day. These will be distributed to states that have not yet received the vaccine.

By 26 February, the Science, Technology and Innovation Minister Khairy Jamaluddin confirmed that a million people had registered for COVID-19 vaccines via the MySejahtera app.

==== March ====
On 4 March 2021, the Special Committee on Ensuring Access to COVID-19 Vaccine Supply (JKJAV) confirmed that 80,336 Malaysians had received their first COVID-19 vaccine dose.

On 15 March 2021, the Science, Technology and Innovation Minister Khairy Jamaluddin announced that Pfizer would be sending 1,000,350 doses of the Pfizer-BioNTech vaccines to Malaysia by the end of the month. That same day, he confirmed that Malaysia would begin administering CoronaVac on 18 March.

On 29 March, the Science, Technology and Innovation Minister Khairy confirmed that the second phase of the national immunisation programme would begin on 19 April 2021 and target elderly people, disabled people, and those with comorbidities.

==== April ====
On 1 April, Health Minister Adham Baba announced that the second phase of the National COVID-19 Immunisation Programme would start on 17 April 2021, two days ahead of the earlier scheduled date.

On 9 April, Communications and Multimedia Minister Saifuddin Abdullah noted specific efforts to inform Orang Asli communities was intensifying, including through radio broadcasts.

On 27 April, Health Minister Adham Baba announced that Malaysia would use the Oxford–AstraZeneca COVID-19 vaccine after health authorities approved its use following a thorough study of clinical assessment and data. The following day, Malaysian health authorities removed the AstraZeneca vaccine from the country's mainstream vaccination programme due to public anxiety about its safety following reports of bloodclotting. The initial 268,600 initial doses will be redirected to Selangor and the federal territory of Kuala Lumpur.

==== May ====
By 2 May 905,683 people had received at least one dose of the Pfizer–BioNTech or Sinovac while 563,350 had received both doses of the vaccine.

On 8 May, the Health Minister Adham Baba confirmed that a total of 666,495 individuals had completed both doses of the vaccine under the first phase of the National COVID-19 Immunisation Programme. He also confirmed that 1,060,773 million individuals had completed the first dose, bringing the total number of doses administered to 1,727,268. By 7 May, 9,924,276 individuals (roughly 40.9% of the Malaysian population) had registered for COVID-19 vaccination.

On 23 May, Senior Minister (Security Cluster) Ismail Sabri Yaakob confirmed that the Malaysian Government would be buying a total of 8.2 million doses of Sinovac vaccine by the end of June with 3.8 million of them being acquired through the "fill and finish" process by Pharmaniaga Life Science Sdn Bhd.

On 26 May, the Health Ministry has opened registrations for AstraZeneca vaccines for 18-60 year old adults. In spite of technical errors, all of its 956,609 slots have been filled, and the registrations were closed within three hours. Internet users complained about glitches preventing them from securing their own appointment dates.

On 27 May, Khairy Jamaluddin announced that AstraZeneca vaccines will be placed under the National COVID-19 Immunisation Programme, so it will only be given by appointments by the government instead of opt-in appointments. Science Advisor Ghows Azzam, from the Ministry of Science, Technology, and Innovation, also announced that the government has purchased an additional 12.8 million doses from Pfizer, starting with 2,223,000 doses arriving in June with 444,600 per week.

==== June ====
On 5 June, Prime Minister Muhyiddin announced plans to ramp up vaccination including importing 16 million stocks of vaccines over the next two months and opening 300 new vaccine centres nationwide. By that stage, 7.2% of the population had received at least one dose of the COVID-19 vaccine.

On 13 June, Datuk Seri Dr Adham Baba spoke that Malaysia is developing two homegrown vaccines. The first will be a ribonucleic acid or messenger vaccine, and the second is an inactivated vaccine.

On 14 June, Khairy Jamaluddin has announced that Phase Four for the national vaccination programme has begun. It is focused on workers in "critical industries", such as food, manufacturing, retail, construction, plantation, and hospitality. It will be conducted with a vaccine delivery centre, coordinated by the International Trade and Industry Ministry, and vaccinations will begin on 16 June. Workers will receive the vaccines for free, and their employers will pay for the purchase of the vaccines to their workplaces. Owing to a surge in COVID-19 cases in Labuan, the government will also deliver 30,000 vaccines.

On 15 June, Health Director-General Noor Hisham Abdullah announces that single dose vaccines from Cansino and Janssen were given conditional approval for public use. In addition, the Pfizer vaccine was also approved for used on persons 12 and above.

On 20 June 2021, the Director-General of Health Noor Hisham Abdullah stated that Malaysia was expecting to achieve herd immunity status by November or December 2021. He also indicated the country's vaccination programme would be expanded. As of 20 June, less than 10% of Malaysians had been vaccinated.

On 21 June, the coordinating minister for the National COVID-19 Immunisation Programme Khairy Jamaluddin confirmed that refugee communities in Malaysia would be inoculated with CanSino Biologics' Convidecia vaccine. The first shipment is due to arrive in late July 2021.

On 21 June, Health Minister Adham Baba and COVID-19 immunisation coordinating minister Khairy confirmed that the Malaysian Institute of Medical Research (IMR) and Universiti Putra Malaysia had begun developing a COVID-19 vaccine using mRNA technology since November 2020. On 4 July, IMR director Dr Tahir Aris confirmed that the Malaysian vaccine was being designed as a booster shot and would expect to be ready in 2024. RM3.1mil was also approved for the development of COVID-19 vaccines for laboratory and animal studies only.

==== July ====
On 5 July, Malaysian Health Minister Dr Adham Baba confirmed that 8% of the Malaysian population (roughly 2,618,316 people) had completed two doses of COVID-19 vaccination as of 4 July. The Government plans to vaccinate 10% of the population by mid July.

On 6 July, Malaysia received 1 million doses of the Pfizer COVID-19 vaccine from the United States for its National COVID-19 Immunisation Programme. On 24 June, Malaysia had also received 1 million AstraZeneca vaccine doses from Japan. That same day, the JKJAV confirmed that Malaysia would be receiving about 14 million vaccine doses in July 2021. This figure includes 6.43 million Pfizer vaccine doses including the US donation, 1.59 million doses of AstraZeneca vaccines (including delivery of AstraZeneca manufactured in Thailand and a donation from Japan) and 6.38 million doses of CoronaVac (from Pharmaniaga and a donation from China).

On 14 July, the Malaysian government shut down a mass vaccination center in the state of Selangor after 204 medical staff and volunteers tested positive for COVID-19. Science Minister Khairy Jamaluddin ordered the testing of all 453 workers at the Ideal Convention Centre after two volunteers tested positive for COVID-19. Khairy confirmed that the 204 individuals tested had low viral loads, meaning that the amount of virus in their bodies was small.

On 15 July, The Sydney Morning Herald reported that Malaysia had one of the fastest COVID-19 vaccination rates in the world, giving out 400,000 doses a day on average; double the pace of Australia.

Starting 16 July, vaccination centres were open for walk-in vaccinations for senior citizens above the age of 60. Khairy Jamaluddin also announced "Operation Surge Capacity", which will be held from 26 July to 1 August. It will ensure that 272,000 doses will be given to residents of the Klang Valley, adding 2.6 million people to the 3.5 million who have received their first dose. Walk-in vaccinations for all remaining adults in the Klang Valley (especially those without documents or MySejahtera) are projected be available after 1 August, but only for adults who had not received a previous appointment.

On 31 July, 8 vaccination centres were opened for the walk-in vaccinations for the Klang Valley: the Kuala Lumpur Convention Centre, Bangi Avenue Convention Centre, Wyndham Hotel (Klang), Tun Razak Hall (Sabak Bernam), Community Hall at Serendah, Movenpick Hotel and Convention Centre at KLIA, Ideal Convention Centre (Shah Alam), and Bukit Jalil National Stadium (for non-Malaysian citizens from 9–22 August).

==== August ====
On 6 August, Higher Education Minister Datuk Seri Dr Noraini Ahmad announced that the Higher Education Ministry will begin vaccinating all staff and students of higher learning institutions in stages from October onwards.

On 7 August, the walk-in programme has been expanded to cover all vaccination centres throughout Malaysia. Perak, Kedah, Sabah, Melaka, and Sarawak have begun their walk-in initiatives for senior citizens; while Kelantan focused on vaccination based on pre-booked inoculation sessions.

On a speech on 8 August, Prime Minister Muhyiddin Yassin announced relaxed rules for fully vaccinated people. 14 days after their second dose (or 28 days for those taking single-dose vaccines), fully vaccinated people in Phase 2 and 3 states began to enjoy certain benefits from 10 August onwards.

On 13 August, Khairy Jamaluddin announced that Malaysia will start offering COVID-19 jabs to all children aged between 12 and 17 beginning 15 September 2021 following revised recommendations to the Special Committee On COVID-19 Vaccine Supply (JKJAV). The COVID-19 vaccines will first be offered to the adolescents with underlying medical conditions, followed by the healthy individuals in that age group from older to younger ones. An announcement will also be made by JKJAV soon on how COVID-19 vaccinations for adolescents will be implemented as per Health Director-General Dr Noor Hisham Abdullah's circular and the latest updated clinical guidelines. The inoculation programme for 12 to 17 year olds will be carried out at selected vaccination centres (PPVs) — namely, special PPVs (hospitals and medical institutes), health clinic PPVs or via outreach programmes such as immunisation in schools.

On 16 August, Khairy Jamaluddin has confirmed that he has resigned from his post as the Coordinating Minister for the National COVID-19 Immunisation Programme as well as Minister of Science, Technology and Innovation following the resignation of Prime Minister Muhyiddin Yassin along with his cabinet. Dr Adham Baba has also resigned from his position as Malaysia's Minister of Health.

On 21 August, the Sarawak government announced vaccination would open to those ages 12–17.

By 27 August, 1.9 million of the 2.32 million students aged between 12 and 17 years enrolled at national schools nationwide had registered for COVID-19 vaccinations via the MySejahtera app.

==== September ====
In a press conference on 4 September, the country's new Health Minister Khairy Jamaluddin stated that Malaysia will begin vaccinating those who are under the age of 18 from 8 September onwards, starting with Sarawak. It is also the prepare the students for next month's school sessions.

On 7 September, Minister of International Trade and Industry Mohamed Azmin Ali announced that Malaysia would start treating COVID-19 as an endemic disease from late October 2021 due to the country's high vaccination rate.

By 15 September, the Special Committee On COVID-19 Vaccine Supply (JKJAV) reported that 76.2% of Malaysia's adult population (17,833,355 individuals) had been fully vaccinated against COVID-19. The COVID-19 Immunisation Task Force-Adolescent (CITF-A) was formed on the same date under the Ministry of Health to target full vaccination for 80% of Malaysians aged 12 to 17 before the reopening of schools in the country.

By 19 September, more than 70,000 people had received CanSino Biologics' single-dose Convidecia vaccine. The COVID-19 Immunisation Task Force has prioritised the Convidecia vaccine for communities living in hard-to-reach areas including the Orang Asli as well as the homeless and undocumented individuals. Priority states for the CanSino vaccine include Sabah, Johor, Kedah, Kelantan, Perak, Sabah and Terengganu. That same day, Health Minister Khairy Jamaludin confirmed that booster shots will be implemented for elderly people and people with comorbidities.

On 21 September, the government and JKJAV reported more than 80% of Malaysia's adult population have been fully vaccinated with 18,766,340 individuals, while the 93.2% have already received at least one vaccine dose with 21,813,163 individuals. The National COVID-19 Immunisation Programme for adolescents aged 18 and below will also be conducted through a scheduled walk-in method at 156 selected vaccination centres (PPVs) starting from Thursday (23 September) to facilitate and expedite the process.

By 22 September, more than half-a-million individuals aged between 12 and 17 have already received at least one dose of the vaccine with the government on a target of at least 60% of teenagers to receive at least one vaccination dose by November, while having 80% of teenagers to be fully vaccinated by January 2022. The state of Sabah is currently leading the target group with 56% of adolescents registered in schools receiving the first vaccine dose.

On 23 September, Khairy Jamaluddin stated that the goal of achieving herd immunity status is no longer suitable with the current situation due to the widespread transmission of the COVID-19 Delta variant and that vaccinations of adolescents under the immunisation programme is important instead. That same day, the COVID-19 Immunisation Task Force (CITF) announced that foreign workers of all sectors in the Klang Valley would be eligible for both walk-in and appointment vaccinations between 27 September and 6 October. Walk-in vaccinations for adolescents were only allowed if they studied in private schools or public universities, who were unable to attend school, or were homeschooled. All other capable adolescents were required to wait for their appointment dates to receive their vaccines.

On 24 September, chairman of the National Recovery Council Muhyiddin Yassin confirmed that Malaysia and Singapore would recognise each other's vaccination certificates in order to facilitate movement between the two countries.

By 24 September, the University of Oxford's "Our World in Data" website reported that 59% of Malaysia's population had been fully vaccinated, beating the United States which at the time reported that 54% of its population had been fully vaccinated. As of 25 September, a total of 42,106,397 vaccine doses have been administered in Malaysia.

On 25 September, Deputy Health Minister Noor Azmi Ghazali said in a report that all public and integrated vaccination centres (PPVs) under the immunisation programme will cease operations beginning 15 October 2021.

By the end of September 2021, all states in the country fully vaccinated 60% of their adult population.

==== October ====
On 5 October, the Deputy Education Minister Datuk Dr Mah Hang Soon warned that teachers who refused to be vaccinated before the 1 November deadline set by the Public Services Department would face disciplinary action.

By 6 October, the Health Ministry confirmed that 20,698,852 individuals (88.4% of the adult population in Malaysia) had been fully vaccinated.

By 7 October, 89.1% of Malaysia's adult population has been fully vaccinated.

On 9 October, Director-General of Health Noor Hisham Abdullah confirmed that the Pfizer–BioNTech COVID-19 vaccine had been approved for the country's booster shot programme. That same day, Prime Minister Ismail Sabri Yaakob confirmed that interstate travel will be allowed to resumed within the next few days once 90% of the adult population has been fully vaccinated.

On 29 October, the Malaysian Government announced that it would buy stocks of the Pfizer-BioNTech COVID-19 vaccine for children after a panel of advisers to the United States Food and Drug Administration recommended that the vaccine be authorised for children aged between 5 and 11 years.

==== November ====
On 1 November, Prime Minister Ismail Sabri Yaakob launched a National Vaccine Development Roadmap (PPVN) and Malaysian Genome and Vaccine Institute (MGVI) to stimulate vaccine production in Malaysia. These projects include producing two types of COVID-19 vaccines developed by the Institute for Medical Research using inactivated virus and mRNA technologies and a therapeutic cancer vaccine for the treatment of head and neck cancer.

By 2 November, the Health Ministry estimated that 95.7% of the adult Malaysian population (roughly 22,393,720 individuals) had been fully vaccinated. In addition, 97.8% of the adult population (roughly 22,885,170 individuals) had received at least one dose. 69% of teenagers between the ages of 12 and 17 years (2,171,270 individuals) had been fully vaccinated while 83.2% of teenagers within that age bracket (2,619,573) had received at least one dose. By 2 November, a total of 407,607 booster shots had been administered.

By 7 November, the Health Ministry reported that 75.2% of the population (24,552,038) had been fully vaccinated.

By 17 November, the Heath Ministry reported that 95.4% of the adult population in the country (22,332,571 individuals) have been fully vaccinated. 97.7% of the adult population (22,882,504 individuals) had received one dose of the vaccine. 81% of adolescents (2,549,437 individuals) have been fully vaccinated while 87.2% of adolescents (2,743,176 individuals) have received one dose.

On 17 November, the Malaysian Drug Control Authority authorised the use of the Oxford-AstraZeneca vaccine and CoronaVac as COVID-19 booster shots for individuals aged 18 years and above who had already received those vaccine types.

==== December ====
On 28 December, the Malaysian Government reduced the waiting interval between primary and booster shots to three months. By 27 December, 97.6% of adults in Malaysia had been fully vaccinated.

=== 2022 ===
==== January ====
On 28 January, Malaysia received its first shipment of 624,000 COVID-19 vaccine doses for children in preparation for the planned vaccination of children commencing in February 2022.

==== February ====
On 3 February, the Government launched the National COVID-19 Immunisation Programme for Children (PICKids) in the Klang Valley.

By 27 February, a total of 805,676 children aged between five and 11 years old (roughly 22.7% of the eligible population) had received their first dose of the COVID-19 vaccine under the National COVID-19 Immunisation Programme for Children (PICKids). In addition, 61.7% of the adult population (14,517,869) had received their booster shot.

==== June ====
On 18 June, the Malaysian Foreign Minister Saifuddin Abdullah and Indian External Affairs Minister Subrahmanyam Jaishankar signed a mutual agreement for the two countries to recognise each other's COVID-19 vaccination certificates.

==== December ====
On 14 December, the Health Ministry granted conditional approval for the Covid-19 bivalent vaccine. Director-General Noor Hisham Abdullah confirmed that bivalent vaccines would be distributed in 2023.

On 27 December, Noor Hisham Abdullah announced that the Health Ministry would seek to boost the country's vaccine booster rollout due to a surge in COVID-19 cases originating in China.

=== 2023 ===
==== January ====
On 10 January, Director-General Noor Hisham Abdullah confirmed that the National Pharmaceutical Regulatory Agency (NPRA) had extended the shelf life of COVID-19 vaccines by one year after manufacturing companies submitted new data on their stability.

On 21 January, the NPRA approved an application by Solution Biologics Sdn Bhd to extend the shelf life of the Convidecia from 15 to 18 months if stored at a temperature between 2 and 8 degrees Celsius.

==== March ====
On 21 March, the Health Ministry confirmed that nearly 2.8 million vaccine doses of various brands being stored at Ministry and COVID-19 storage facilities had expired by the end of February 2023.

=== June ===
By 8 June, the White Paper on COVID-19 Vaccine Procurement Management confirmed that the Malaysian Government had spent RM4.482 billion on vaccine procurement and logistics. The White Paper also confirmed that almost 8.5 million doses of COVID-19 vaccines had expired by 2 May 2023.

=== December ===
In response to a surge in COVID-19 cases, the Health Ministry encouraged people to take the COVID-19 vaccines, publishing a list of 234 vaccination centres on the MySejahtera app.

On 20 December, the Sarawak state government ordered RM2 million worth of the antiviral drug Paxlovid to counter rising COVID-19 cases in the state.

== Vaccination centres ==
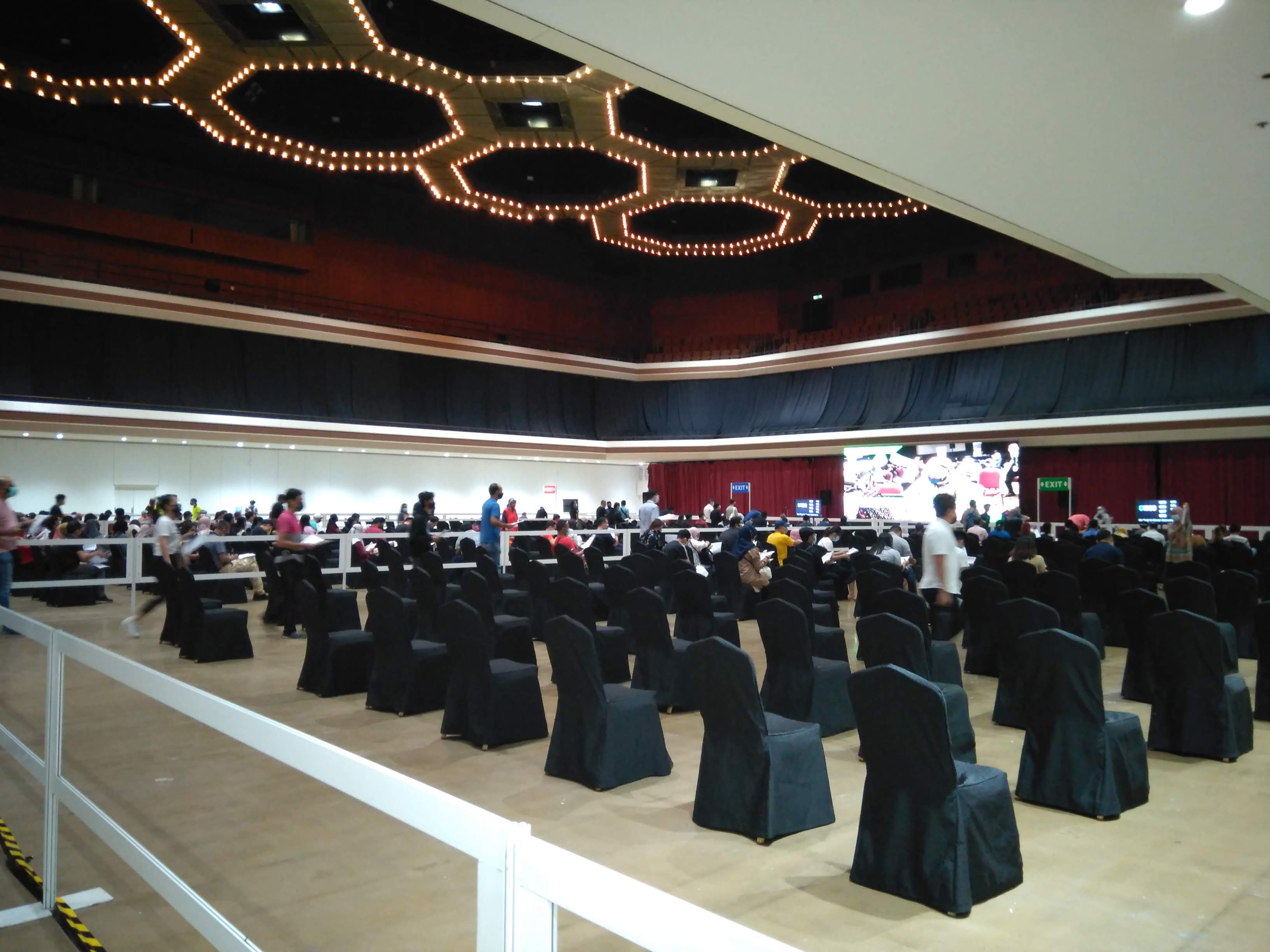
PWTC is used as a vaccination center.

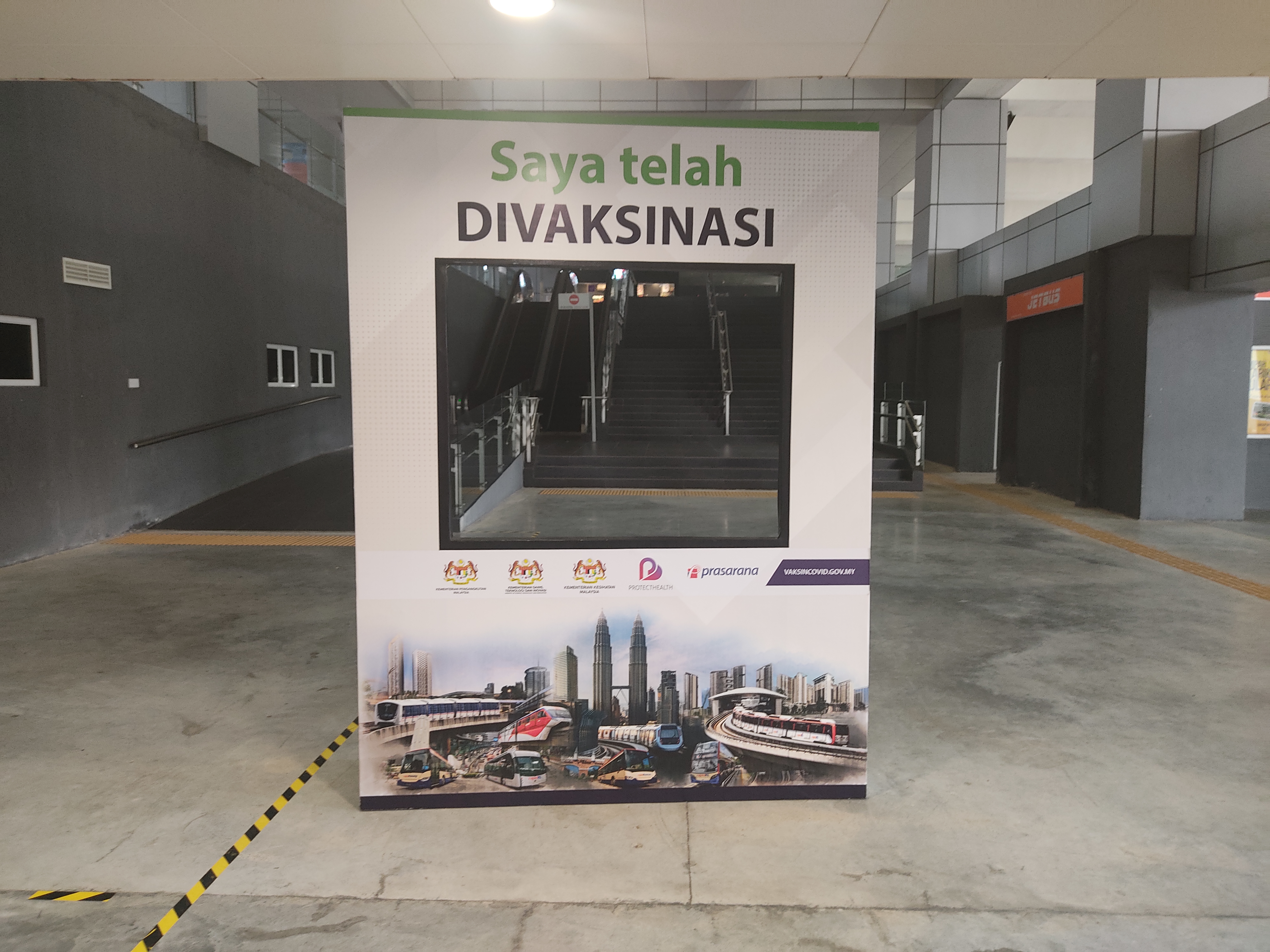
Putra Heights LRT Station is one of the PPV with photo spot for residents to take a photo

605 sites were first identified as Vaccination Administration Centres (Malay: Pusat Pemberian Vaksin), commonly known as PPVs, to kick off the vaccination program. With temporary vaccine centres such as stadiums, convention centres, public halls, universities and other appropriate facilities were also included to vaccinate the population as quickly as possible. All vaccination administration centres across the country under NIP are to be shut down on 15 October 2021 following the statement in a report by the Deputy Health Minister Noor Azmi Ghazali.

To facilitate the next phase of the vaccination program, private clinics were also included and functioning as vaccination centres. A list of every Vaccination Administration Centre was published online by The Special Committee on COVID-19 Vaccine Supply.

In addition to addressed locations, mobile vaccination centres converted from buses were deployed. It was initially targeted towards petty traders in Selangor and people in rural areas, but it was later expanded to residents of plantations, rural settlements and public housing projects. It afterwards expanded to cover the other states in the Peninsula from 17 July onwards.

List of vaccines administration centres, as of 18 August 2021
State	Hospital hubs	Vaccine centres	Health clinics	Total
Perlis	1	3	0	4
Penang	6	23	0	29
Kedah	9	21	1	31
Perak	14	31	0	45
Kelantan	9	28	0	37
Terengganu	6	19	0	25
Pahang	13	43	23	79
Negeri Sembilan	7	19	32	58
Malacca	3	20	0	23
Johor	12	37	2	51
Sabah	24	47	19	90
Sarawak	20	71	0	91
Selangor	13	50	50	113
Kuala Lumpur	3	13	0	16
Putrajaya	1	3	0	4
Labuan	1	7	0	8
Total number of centres nationwide				704

== Vaccinations data ==
As of 23 November 2021

=== Vaccinations by state (Total Population) ===
State/Federal Territory	Vaccinated (1st dose)	Vaccinated (2nd dose)	Percentage (2nd dose, total population)	Booster dose
Johor	3,012,675	2,900,972	76.7%	16,718
Kedah	1,548,248	1,495,227	68.4%	12,004
Kelantan	1,171,887	1,113,611	58.4%	11,522
Kuala Lumpur	3,017,988	2,941,563	89.0%	25,766
Labuan	81,388	76,196	76.5%	1,993
Malacca	713,862	699,410	75.0%	13,512
Negeri Sembilan	945,775	898,074	79.6%	7,434
Pahang	1,169,545	1,125,819	67.1%	12,080
Penang	1,513,637	1,467,341	82.7%	12,074
Perak	1,843,141	1,785,721	71.1%	30,437
Perlis	203,192	169,388	77.0%	2,321
Putrajaya	147,303	139,618	89.0%	1,455
Sabah	2,375,882	2,235,473	57.2%	23,043
Sarawak	2,136,052	2,082,109	73.9%	85,638
Selangor	4,720,380	4,412,324	89.0%	27,850
Terengganu	877,025	841,742	66.8%	7,562
Total	52,082,943 (administered) 25,688,568 (1st dose)	25,011,232 (2nd dose)	78.1% (1st dose) 76.59% (2nd dose)	1,571,340 (Booster dose)

=== Vaccination charts ===
View source data.
View source data.

== Issues and controversies ==
=== Adverse effects ===
On 10 May 2024, Health Minister Dzulkefly Ahmad announced that the Malaysian Government would continue to offer care to individuals suffering from adverse effects of COVID-19 vaccines including the Oxford-AstraZeneca COVID-19 vaccine. He also confirmed that the Malaysian Government had data on adverse effects caused by COVID-19 vaccines and methods for treating the side effects. On 13 May, Deputy Health Minister Lukanisman Awang Sauni confirmed that the Malaysian Government would release a report on the AstraZeneca vaccine's adverse effects later in the week.

=== Claims of empty syringes or reduced doses ===
In July 2021, claims of recipients getting empty syringes or reduced doses begin arising on social media. Several videos of empty or near-empty syringes being injected into the recipient's arms were also uploaded online. Some of these recipients were able to get another first dose after requesting for one or confronting the officers-in-charge. These made some of the public who have received their vaccination to start doubting if they actually received an actual shot or not. Some of the vaccine booths are private, only allowing one nurse and one recipient at a time. The vaccines are filled in the syringes before the recipient enters the booth so there is no way to see them fill it up from the original vaccine vials. Before the incident, the CITF did require the nurses to show the recipient the filled syringe before injecting them, as this was not the first time claims of empty syringes had surfaced, but it just wasn't as widespread. The CITF opened an investigation and concluded it to human error as the nurses were tired. The CITF also revoked an order that disallowed recipients to record themselves being injected as evidence to put the public at ease. As of July 2021, there had been 13 such reports made to the police.

On 30 September, video recording of a 12-year-old given an empty syringe was going viral online. The incident took place at the Universiti Malaya vaccination centre. The COVID-19 Immunisation Task Force-Adolescent (CITF-A) chairman Datuk Dr Noor Azmi Ghazali later clarified that the medical staff took an empty syringe that had not been used, instead of a syringe that had been filled with the vaccine earlier, calling it a human error. He added that upon completion of the process, the medical staff realised the mistake and informed the medical officer on duty at the vaccination centre. They then discussed with his parents and after explaining, his parents permitted the vaccine to be given on a different arm under the low dose procedure, which is part of the clinical guideline that recommends administration of the vaccine in the opposite arm if the first dose is deemed insufficient and a re-dose is required. The medical staff concerned has been warned to be extra careful and follow the prescribed procedures. The existing procedure has also been improved by ensuring that no other syringes are on the table when administering the injection. The CITF-A also apologised for the incident. On 3 October, The CITF-A also released a statement stating that one parent is now allowed to follow their child throughout the vaccination process as a witness. Once the vaccination process in completed, the parent is requested to wait outside while the child goes to the monitoring station for 15–30 minutes to rest, this is to ensure that there is enough seats at the monitoring stations. Video recording is also permitted, as it has always been.

==== Claims of staff not allowing recordings ====
On 25 August, a man in Johor was stopped while filming himself getting vaccinated, even though it was permitted by the Health Minister and the CITF. The nurse administering the vaccine had given him permission to record but another staff member, believed to be a health officer, interrupted and covered his camera. In the clip, the staff member can be heard saying "Cannot record. KJ has resigned", referring to Khairy Jamaluddin, who, along with other members of the Muhyiddin cabinet had tendered their resignation to the Yang di-Pertuan Agong on 16 August, stripping him of his title as the Science, Technology, and Innovation Minister, as well as Coordinating Minister for the NIP.

The staff then added that according to the Ministry of Health, recordings are not allowed, despite Khairy and the Health Minister's previous approval to do so, which came about after claims of people receiving empty syringes and reduced doses. The man uploaded the video to Twitter. Many netizens questioned the staff's action. On 27 August 2021, Khairy became the Health Minister in the Ismail Sabri cabinet. He also continues his role as the head of the CITF and with his move to the Health Ministry, better coordination is expected for the vaccination efforts. He also responded to the viral tweet from the man in Johor with "Assalamualaikum".

=== Slow rollout rate ===
The initial rollout was very slow and many who have registered for an appointment in February were frustrated for not getting an appointment. The then Science, Technology and Innovation Minister Khairy Jamaluddin says that this was due to the slow supply from the manufacturers as the country receives their order bit by bit every week, claiming that rich countries buying and hoarding the vaccine stock are causing a global vaccine shortage especially for middle to low income countries and not due to the local logistics as the country had ordered sufficient vaccines to cover more than the total population, along with enough facilities to vaccinate every adult population by December 2021. Sure enough, the country's vaccination rate increased in May and peaked by July and August, having one of the fastest vaccine distribution rates per 100 people in the world, surpassing the UK, US and even Singapore at their peak.

Selangor also had a slow initial rollout despite having made payment for the Sinovac vaccine in February via the government-linked company, Pharmaniaga. The state only received its 2.5 million doses in June as the federal government's orders took priority and they received their orders in March. In August, then Federal vaccine minister Khairy Jamaluddin previously said that Pharmaniaga Berhad, the local distributor and fill-and-finish manufacturer of Sinovac's COVID-19 vaccine, was supposed to deliver NIP's order first before distributing the shots to any other party, including state governments.

As of late August 2021, after weeks of rapid vaccination rates, COVID-19 vaccination rates in Malaysia have been declining since the start of the month amid reported vaccine supply problems, as the epidemic surges in several states. Since peak vaccination of more than 540,000 average jabs on 1 August, doses administered nationwide fluctuated between 450,000 and less than 500,000 daily in the past fortnight, based on rolling seven-day averages. The rapid jabs were also in part thanks to the efforts of Operation Surge Capacity in the Klang Valley, which seek to administer one dose to every adult in the Klang Valley from 26 July to 1 August. Coronavirus vaccine shortages were recently reported in Sabah, Johor, and Penang, putting a stumbling block in vaccinations that accelerated in previous weeks as vaccine centres (PPVs) closed and inoculation slots were limited. The Selangor state government was even prompted to loan 500,000 doses to the central administration.

By 25 August, Kedah, Kelantan, and Sabah fully vaccinated less than 40% of their adult populations, while Perak has double-jabbed about 43%, Penang at 49% and Johor at about 40%. The national average is about 58%, pulled up by vaccination rates exceeding 85% in Sarawak, the Klang Valley, and Labuan. Khairy's then science advisor Ghows Azzam tweeted that the federal government has procured about 87.9 million vaccine doses (Pfizer-BioNTech, Sinovac, AstraZeneca-Oxford, the global COVAX facility, CanSino, and Sputnik V), enough to cover 140% of the population. Only about 32.2 million doses have been administered nationwide as of 24 August 2021. He also believed COVID-19 vaccination in Sabah, Penang, and Johor would continue at high rates, but noted that there is still not enough vaccine for everyone until end of Oct, as the country aims to have every adult fully vaccinated by the end of October. Despite declining vaccination rates, Malaysia managed to reach the 40% milestone of complete vaccination of the total population on 22 August, earlier than South Korea and Australia that started their coronavirus vaccine rollouts at about the same time as Malaysia.

=== Poor prioritisation of recipients ===
Many were unsatisfied that politicians and their family were given vaccination priority despite parliament being suspended. Many also questioned why teachers, lawyers, students taking exams and even vaccine centre volunteers weren't given priority but certain other sectors of the economy were under the PIKAS by the Ministry of International Trade and Industry (MITI). Most vaccine centre volunteers, who have to handle thousands of people daily, took the vaccine on their own accord from a different vaccine centre rather than be provided one by the vaccine centre that they volunteer at. Some also claimed that VIPs were given priority and could even avoid the queue at vaccine centres such as in Teluk Intan, as well as even cutting ahead of the disabled in Kuching. The CITF has tightened measures to avoid this and also launch investigations into such incidents.

=== Claims of volunteers selling appointments or vaccines ===
In June 2021, there were claims online that some of the volunteers were selling appointment slots or vaccines to the public. CITF said it has on 14 and 22 June lodged two police reports over allegations of private vaccine sales. The police also arrested three individuals for allegedly charging RM420 for two doses of the vaccines, with payment to be made after the vaccination was done. This also came during a period when the vaccine rollout was still slow and many vaccination centres had informal waitlists to avoid vaccine wastage due to no-shows, which may have contributed to the claims.

=== Informal waitlist ===
In relation to the claims of volunteers selling appointments or vaccines, many vaccine centres had an informal waitlist for when no-shows occurs to avoid vaccine wastage. Queues were also seen outside some vaccine centre near the end of the day. Many centres prioritise those on the waitlist who are in Phase 2, that is, elderly, disabled or those with comorbidities, or offer it to those who had accompanied their dependents for vaccination. However, some Phase 3 recipients managed to get vaccinated after leaving their contact details at a vaccination centre. In some instances, vaccination centre staff ring up nearby businesses or GP clinics to ask if the staff on duty that day can come in as soon as possible to get vaccinated.

This was the experience of former Pandan MP Rafizi Ramli, who took to Twitter to share that he and his wife were vaccinated after a vaccination centre near his office called him to ask if he can come in to get the jab, to fill in for absent recipients.

In a press conference earlier this year, minister in charge of the National COVID-19 Immunisation Programme, Khairy Jamaluddin, said waitlists are provided to vaccination centres by CITF, and centres cannot take walk-in registrations for waitlists but experiences on the ground run counter to what the government says is standard practice.

By late July and August 2021 when the vaccination rate had increased and more of the population being vaccinated, reports of such incidents have reduced in urban areas as less no-shows occurred due to the increase in daily infection cases and deaths, while the authorities have been actively preventing anyone from waiting outside vaccine centres due to an ongoing pandemic lockdown.

=== Poor appointment booking system ===
Many were frustrated with the appointment booking system, which is done on the MySejahtera application. The poor UI design and lack of instruction was also frustrating for some users, particularly during the early phase. Slow update of vaccination status on the application, sudden vaccination appointments on the same day without prior notice, sudden venue, date or time change were among the many issues faced by users. Some users have also claimed that they were given venues far away from their home or even out of state, forcing some to travel long distances to get vaccinated despite a travel restriction being in place. Khairy Jamaluddin claims that this is due to an issue with the Google Maps API. Some vaccine appointments also vanished. There were also reports of the app being inaccessible due to server side issues during the early phase. Many also complained about the lack of a notification system when an appointment was given despite the app having a notification system, albeit a clunky buggy one. The call centres and helpdesk were also not helpful and often had long call queues, long delays and no replies. An incident also occurred where a frustrated recipient confronted Khairy Jamaluddin who was helping out at a vaccination centre about her father's vaccination appointment. Her father was a cancer patient and should have gotten priority. The woman said her father's vaccination appointment which was set for the day (26 May 2021) had been inexplicably moved to 15 June in the morning. The woman did not want to wait as she wants her father to be inoculated immediately and regretted to resorting to such 'shameful' acts to solve her issue. Khairy was able to keep his cool and help the woman. He claimed that it was due to insertion of an incorrect MyKad number. The incident was uploaded online to social media and it came a day after users had to deal with a frustrating website-only booking for the AstraZeneca vaccine.

The website-only booking for the AstraZeneca vaccine in the Klang Valley was also met with frustration by the public. Owing to fears of bloodclot, the government decided to hold a separate first-come-first-serve appointment queue for those who wish to take it on 2 May 2021 in the Klang Valley. Another round was done later on 26 May 2021, with the appointments opened up to Penang, Johor and Sarawak, which also had the same problems as the first round. The first-come-first-serve appointment system was met with criticism and frustration as it meant only those who are tech savvy enough and have a fast enough internet connection can get a spot easily. The website was slow to load, update and even crashed several times for many users when it was opened. The booking slots were not even properly available to some for the first 15 minutes after the booking was opened. Many were not sure if their appointment request was properly made as the website had an inconsistent confirmation respond. Users had to wait the next day to check on their MySejahtera app to confirm their appointment. Some even got a different date than the one they chose. These issues persisted for the second round. During the second time, some who didn't make an appointment or thought that they didn't managed to get one due to the lack of a confirmation reply, got one too. Many also questioned the huge amount of taxpayers money (RM70 Million) used to develop the servers and website. Khairy Jamaluddin, who is the Coordinating Minister for the National COVID-19 Immunisation Programme, clarified that the amount was a ceiling set by the government for the development and management of various other health systems and not just for the registration of AstraZeneca vaccines. Some tech savvy users took it upon themselves and found the problem to be from the server side due to poor server optimisations, programming and that the developers might be using a free version of cloudflare.Many on social media called this a 'Hunger Games' system as the slots were snapped up quickly.

There were also claims made by the CITF that mass block booking made via the SELangkah app, the contact-tracing and vaccine registration app made for Selangor, was responsible for the website errors, as a huge number of bookings were made via the same IP address, including the SELangkah app. This resulted CITF receiving complains from people who did not make any booking for the AstraZeneca vaccine receiving appointment notifications. SELangkah however denied being the source of this but gave their full cooperation into investigating the matter. Following an investigation, SELangkah concluded that they were responsible for the confusion as it had allegedly made bulk bookings for people without their prior consent. SELangkah booked AstraZeneca slots without first checking whether individuals in its ImuniSel database had agreed to receive the AstraZeneca vaccine, thus it replaced their earlier appointments if they already have one. ImuniSel is the Selangor government's vaccine outreach programme that helps residents, especially those with limited IT skills or access, register for NIP. SELangkah cooperated with CITF by providing the contacts of those who were registered and was able to reach out to those who did not sign up for the vaccine without prior consent. Those who agree will be allowed to take the vaccine while those who refused will be given a new appointment. An additional feature in the MySejahtera app will be developed in the near future to enable affected individuals who had their previous appointments being replaced by new appointments, to be able to give feedback and receive an immediate solution.

These issues along with the limited slots and daily increasing cases made many extremely frustrated. Khairy Jamaluddin apologised for the poor registration experience and promised to do better.

The MySejahtera app also did not properly show the second dosage date for the AstraZeneca vaccine, showing a date 4 weeks later instead of 12 as recommended. This was rectified in an update as the developer included information for AstraZeneca.

=== Overcrowding at vaccination centres ===
During May 2021, when vaccine distribution was at phase 2, some vaccination centres were overcrowded and the poor facilities made many elder recipients uncomfortable. As the elderly required special attention, this bottleneck slowed the process in many centres. The issues were mostly solved when bigger mega vaccine centres were opened.

On 29 May 2021, the Kuala Lumpur World Trade Centre (formerly Putra World Trade Centre), which is the vaccine centre for distributing the AstraZeneca vaccine for those who signed up for it during the first round of booking, experienced and overcrowding issue. This occurred a week after the centre expanded its capacity. Crowds were seen queueing outside all the way to the Sunway Putra pedestrian bridge as many also broke social distancing rules. Many waited longer than usual, pass their allocated hours and the delay caused a few people to walk away. This was unlike the previous days where the centre was operating smoothly. Then Health Minister Khairy Jamaluddin said that the overcrowding was due to a shortened operation hour. The problem was rectified the next day. The centre had previously experienced overcrowding issue on 15 May 2021 as many people who did not managed to make an appointment 'tried their luck' for any leftover dose from no-shows. Many recipients also arrived way ahead of schedule, fearing a crowd and long queue, which ironically contributed to the cause of an actual crowd and long queue. The crowd control was improved the next day. Khairy also pleaded to those without appointments to not 'try their luck' and for those who have appointments to arrive 15–30 minutes early instead of hours before their scheduled time.

On 10 August, reports of long queues at certain vaccination centres also surfaced in August, like the Bukit Jalil National Stadium, when the government made walk-in available in certain centres in the Klang Valley, as long queues were seen outside mega vaccine centres. Despite this, There are temperature checks and volunteers on site to monitor the flow of people. The long queue surge was expected as people who did not get an appointment rush to walk-in. The lines were as long 500m for an hour and as many of the walk-ins were migrants who did not understand the instructions, which was given out in Bahasa Melayu, bottlenecks occurred. Walk-in vaccination for foreigners at Bukit Jalil National Stadium was replaced with appointment based again on 22 August.

A misunderstanding also caused one charity hotel to be so overcrowded that people were 'queue hugging' outside. A video of the incident went viral and prompted the Deputy Prime Minister to take action.Many also criticised the police in the video who were there for not doing anything about the situation but instead telling the man off about his illegally parked motorcycle. The misunderstanding arose when the charity hotel, which provides aid for those affected by the pandemic, was said to provide walk-in vaccination for non-citizen. Bukit Jalil National Stadium was the only vaccination centre that provided walk-ins for non-citizens at that time. The police later released a statement saying that they have sent a compliance team to manage the situation and that they successfully controlled the situation at the centre. Many refused to disperse despite the police asking them to do so.

On 7 September it was reported that a long queue was spotted outside the Bandar Baru Ayer Itam government clinic in Penang, as the crowd, mostly foreigners, had gone there hoping to secure COVID-19 vaccination slots for next week. The crowd soon dispersed soon after they found out that the 90 slots had been taken up.

On 28 September, it was reported that a vaccination centre in Semporna, Sabah was overcrowded after Semporna plans to enforce restrictions for the unvaccinated to enter premises or hold a job and fearmongering occurred with some saying that unvaccinated people might be apprehended. things got worse in a hurry after walk-in vaccinations were announced, as most of those crowding to vaccination centres are stateless people or immigrants without any documentation. The authorities could not control the crowd. An individual was reported to have contracted Covid while queueing at the vaccination centre. The number of stateless residents or undocumented migrants, the lack of infrastructure and manpower along with the lackadaisical attitude towards the virus was blamed as the cause of overcrowding in Semporna and other rural areas in Malaysia. An earlier report by Malaysiakini reported that the crowding issue had actually started since 21 September.

=== Discrimination towards migrants ===
There had been reports and videos uploaded online of volunteers mistreating, being particularly aggressive and discriminatory towards migrants. Video of a RELA officer kicking several foreigners at the Bukit Jalil National Stadium vaccination centre, which is the only vaccination centre open for walk-in for non-citizens, was posted online on 19 August 2021. Many netizens criticised RELA for their poor treatment and discrimination against foreigners. Some reported that other vaccination centres, like the Axiata Arena PPV, had the same issue where volunteers would hurl insults to foreigners, especially those who did not understand the Malay language or were still not caught up on the procedures. Some vaccination centres were also claimed to have separate queues for migrants and there were also reports that they were made to stand in long lines under the hot sun while locals were allowed to sit with a shade or fan. The volunteers and authorities were criticised for the discriminatory treatment and for not making them feel more comfortable while trying to get vaccinated, as the migrant workers are responsible for a lot of Malaysia's labour workforce. Many migrants also do not trust the vaccine program, especially among the undocumented, for fear of being arrested, despite the government encouraging migrants to be vaccinated and Ismail Sabri Yaakob, Malaysia's then defence minister and now prime minister, saying that the government would not arrest anyone who sought COVID-19 testing or treatment based on their immigration status back in 2020. This also comes in light of reason migrant worker raids done by the government during the pandemic lockdown and the government's expulsion of a migrant worker who was interviewed for an Al Jazeera documentary in 2020. Human rights advocates are claiming that the government was taking advantage of the situation. Many nationalists, known as bawang army or onion army along with the local government media criticised Al Jazeera and claimed it was fake news. Malaysia is known to mistreat migrant workers. Many also criticised that the same discriminatory treatment was not seen towards Western or East Asian expats, during vaccination and any other situations.

Despite this, the CITF had claimed that foreign migrants were also included in the program from the start and they were always counted in the population count. Khairy Jamaluddin, the then science minister who led the vaccination programme, has stressed since the vaccine rollout began that immigration status should be no barrier to access.

The hesitancy by undocumented migrants might impact Malaysia's goal to fully immunised all adult population by October 2021. In spite of this, there are also volunteers who treat the migrants humanely, even calling those who don't out. One volunteer even learnt other languages to help facilitate communications.

As of January 2022 where PPVs are distributing booster doses, migrant and foreign workers are still observed being discriminated against and treated harshly by volunteers and locals alike.

=== Cases of volunteers illegally obtaining recipient's phone number and private information after vaccination ===
There have been reports on social media of some volunteers from vaccination centres obtaining the phone numbers and private information of recipients and sending them unsolicited messages after, breaching the Personal Data Protection Act 2012. One user posted about a military personnel illegally obtaining his sister's phone number and sending unsolicited messages to her. It was believed that the personnel managed to memorise the sister's information from her MySejahtera profile which contained the user's name, MyKad number and phone number. The user's mother happened to snap a photo of the personnel. JKJAV announced that they will take disciplinary action towards the individuals. Many have since posted about such experiences online, most of which have occurred to women. It is unclear if the perpetrators besides a Kuala Lumpur PPV staffer have faced disciplinary action.

Since the start of the National COVID-19 Immunisation Programme, multiple women have taken to social media saying they received text messages from on-duty staff – including those administering the jab – who got their contact details from MySejahtera or the vaccination forms they signed. Despite many Malaysians slamming such actions as a breach of personal data and privacy, the issue remains.

=== COVID-19 outbreaks at vaccination centres ===
In early July, two volunteers at the Ideal Convention Centre Shah Alam (IDCC) were tested positive for COVID-19. Mass testing was done immediately and 204 volunteers were tested positive. The centre was shut for a day on 13 July. Those scheduled for the day were rescheduled and volunteers were also there for those who didn't know of the closure. the IDCC outbreak also evolved into a cluster.

On 11 July 2021, 7 volunteers at the Setia City Convention Centre (SCCC) were also detected positive. An exposé by CodeBlue, a local health news agency, of the centre attempting to cover up the issue later surfaced as volunteers claimed that their risk status on the MySejahtera application was not strictly checked by the centre. They claimed that they were not informed of the outbreak, no guidelines were given out on what to do, no mass testing was conducted and that there was a lack of hand sanitizers. Instead, two SCCC volunteers told CodeBlue that they found out about the three COVID-19 cases from the latter themselves and that the PPV volunteers who subsequently got swabbed did so on their own accord. One of them later tested positive, leading to at least four confirmed coronavirus infections among SCCC PPV staff as of today. Small gatherings in the pantry were also permitted. One of the volunteer claimed that she was not informed of being a close contact with an infected. The volunteers were also not allowed to speak with members of the media without permission from their respective supervisors. A WhatsApp message also revealed that the management did not want news to spread toa void panic among the staff or the spread of fake and untrue news. When asked if the volunteers were vaccinated, they claimed to have gotten it on their own accord in a different centre. Crowds also sometimes turn at the centre, which poses a safety hazard. The police launched an investigation towards CodeBlue and the editor-in-chief that wrote about this under Section 505(b) of the Penal Code, as well as Section 233 of the Communications and Multimedia Act. Wilfred Madius Tangau, then Science, Technology and Innovation Minister, raised the issue of the police investigation in Parliament and Khairy Jamaluddin agreed, urging the police to drop the case.

On 7 July 2021, a recipient who only found out she was positive when she arrived at the vaccine centre also surfaced and caused the vaccine centre, Mines International Convention and Exhibition Centre (MIECC), to be suspended for several hours as all recipients who received an appointment must be negative to be permitted entry. They are allowed to reschedule if they are tested positive.

=== Anti-vaccine movement and anti-vaccine fake news ===
Anti-vaccine fake news have been circulating on social media platforms before the vaccination program started. Many less educated individuals are refusing to take the vaccination due to the questions about religious status of the vaccines, it being a Jewish agenda or due to fears of the side effects. Some claim it to be up to them to vaccinate themselves or their family while influencing others to do so. The government has taken action against those that spread anti-vaccine fake news.The Federal Territories mufti also clarified that the vaccines are halal and obligatory to clear the air and encourage Muslims who are still unsure about the halal status of the vaccine to be inoculated.

On 2 June 2021, a teacher became the first person to be charged over fake vaccine news under a new emergency ordinance, the Emergency (Essential Powers) (No. 2) Ordinance 2021, which came into effect on 11 March 2021. A doctor was fined RM5000 for spreading fake news about the Sinovac vaccine on 26 June 2021.

Anti-vaxxers have also been contributing to the issue of the sales of fake vaccination certificates, even offering up to RM1000, as the government relaxes restrictions for those who have certified fully vaccinated, although many vaccine centres, including private ones have rejected such offers. Some "anti-vaxxers" have also been reported to show up for their vaccine appointment, offering bribes to get their vaccination certificate forged without actually taking the jab. These individuals approach the doctors and boast that they are willing to pay to get the certificates without getting the jabs. They will come and whisper to the medical personnel at the vaccination centres and ask them to pretend to administer the vaccine. However, the numbers of those who wish to do so were very small as most people understand the damage COVID-19 can wreak and want to be protected.

On 24 August, an anti-vaccine couple were arrested for attempting a "social experiment" by entering shops despite not being fully vaccinated and boasting about it on social media after the government had relaxed restrictions for the fully vaccinated. Many netizens were disturbed about the user's post on Facebook, which has since been deleted but reposted as screenshots by other users several other social media sites, where they mentioned about how they were able to go to restaurants and convenient stores that did not ask for their vaccine certificates, boasting about how easy it was to get away with it despite not having a "vaccine passport". The user however mentioned that her husband was refused entry into a barber, but was able to enter another, saying that the former barber had too much money and that they will patronise the latter instead. They also mentioned how they confidently entered a crowded restaurant after family bicycle ride, along with photos of the couple and their two children dining-in at the restaurant. Many users criticised the user for lying and the shopowners for not checking their certificates. The couple were also identified by netizens to be from Klang, Selangor.

While vaccine hesitancy was high during the initial rollout of the vaccine, lockdown fatigue, new COVID-19 variants, better vaccine education and outreach along with the increasing infection rate and death rate has encouraged many, particularly those from urban populations, to be vaccinated and it has been reflected on the country hitting vaccination targets early. As of the end of August 2021, about 57% of the total population have received at least one dose and 41% have been fully inoculated.

On 6 September it was reported that a housewife was fined RM12,000 for sharing misinformation videos about vaccines in Kuala Lumpur.

On 9 October, a now deleted viral video message on Twitter which contained a list of 41 school teachers who have died due to the COVID-19 vaccine. The police and health ministry has since dismissed the fake news and launched an investigation against the owner of the Twitter account under Section 500 of the Penal Code, Section 505 (c) of the Penal Code and Section 233 of the Communications and Multimedia Act 1998. Health Minister Khairy Jamaluddin also took to his official Twitter account to call out the owner of the Twitter account. As his source, the Twitter user cites an anti-vaccine Telegram group called 'AEFI CASES - Covid Vaccines' — the same group that recently spread false information about local singer Fitri Haris's wife, Fazilah Omar.

=== Unequal or inconsistent vaccine supply distribution ===
Malaysia's slow vaccination rollout in the start was due to a slow and inconsistent vaccine supply as rich countries buy and horde more vaccine than they need, despite Malaysia ordering enough to cover the population from various sources and donations. The rollout sped up as Malaysia started getting the supply they ordered. However unequal distribution across states has caused some states to experience supply disruptions, slower rollouts and forced closure of vaccine centres or cancellation of appointments due to the lack of vaccines. Many criticised the government of being bias towards more politically friendly states and that they are not focusing on the states that are facing major outbreaks, or at risk of facing one. In early June, The Selangor Sultan, Sultan Sharafuddin Idris Shah, also criticised the federal government for the unfair distribution to the state and not following through with their promise of 2.9 million doses, receiving only 615,210 doses of the total promised. Several Northeast and east coast states are also slow in their vaccine rollout and many, including the Kelantan state government, have called for the government to increase distribution there as a majority Klang Valley have been vaccinated, before the arrival of the monsoon season storms. In June, Sabah, which is one of the poorest states in the country and a major outbreak source of the 3rd wave of the pandemic after the state election, has one of the lowest vaccination rate in the country. At least 4 vaccination centres in Sabah had to shut due to infrequent vaccine supplies. In mid-August, many in Penang had their appointments rescheduled as vaccine centres closed due to a vaccine shortage. Many also missed their second appointment due to a shortage of the Pfizer vaccine. The state's vaccine supplied was replenished later on.

Many of the states that have entered Phase 2 or Phase 3 recovery are also having increased infection cases but low vaccination rates while the Klang Valley, which has the highest infection rate, also has the highest vaccination percentage, as of end August 2021. The inconsistent supply has become a stumbling block to the nation's rapid vaccination rate, which peaked at more than 540,000 average shots on 1 August. Coronavirus vaccine shortages were recently reported in Sabah, Johor, and Penang, putting a stumbling block in vaccinations that accelerated in previous weeks as vaccine centres (PPVs) closed and inoculation slots were limited. The Selangor state government was even prompted to loan 500,000 doses to the central administration.

By 25 August 2021, Kedah, Kelantan, and Sabah fully vaccinated less than 40% of their adult populations, while Perak has double-jabbed about 43%, Penang at 49% and Johor at about 40 per cent. The national average was about 58%, pulled up by vaccination rates exceeding 85% in Sarawak, the Klang Valley, and Labuan. This issue might prevent the government from achieving its goal of fully inoculating the entire adult population by end October. Despite declining vaccination rates, Malaysia managed to reach the 40% milestone of complete vaccination of the total population on 22 August, earlier than South Korea and Australia that started their coronavirus vaccine rollouts at about the same time as Malaysia.

=== Sales of fake vaccine certificate, vaccination status falsification services and giving legitimate certificates to individuals without injection ===
In August 2021, as the government relaxes restrictions for the fully vaccinated, claims of fake physical vaccine certificate cards being sold online begin to surface as "anti-vaxxers" seek workarounds to bypass restrictions without taking the vaccine. Deputy Health Minister Datuk Dr Noor Azmi Ghazali said the government only recognises the certificate on the app installed on smartphones or the white card issued by the Health Ministry once the vaccination process is completed. Printed copies of the digital certificate will not be recognised. Improvements to the encryption of the certificate's QR code have also been made via updates and one can verify the legitimacy of the certificate via the government's Vaccine Certificate Verifier scanner app, despite any generic QR scanner app being able to read the raw QR data. Before this, any QR scanner app can scan the QR and be taken to a proper certificate website that display's the user's information.

However, on 10 August 2021, a Twitter user begin to highlight that irresponsible individuals may be selling fake COVID-19 digital vaccination certificates, prompting calls for the authorities to probe into the matter. Lembah Pantai MP Fahmi Fadzil in a tweet said this is a serious allegation that warrants a closer look and investigation. According to the now deleted tweet, the vaccination status of any individual can be adjusted on the MySejahtera app by insiders.

An incident of an "anti-vaxxer" woman who did not want to be vaccinated attempting to ask a vaccination centre volunteer who was in charge of managing the MySejahtera information of those who have an appointment and have been vaccinated to help create a fake certificate was also posted online, in order to bypass the government restrictions for unvaccinated individuals. The woman was rejected and was angry at the volunteer despite her explaining that she can't change the information regardless. Several other netizens and volunteers started sharing their experience with "anti-vaxxers" trying to fake their status after the incident was posted online.

A similar incident also occurred where a recipient asked the nurse to let her scan the vaccine and fake her status but not actually inject the vaccine into him. The recipient even offered RM50. The nurse refused and injected him immediately anyway.

As of late August 2021, reports of private clinics getting private clinics and general practitioners (GP) say they have been getting inquiries from "anti-vaxxers", with some offering up to RM1,000, to fake their vaccination status. The cost of getting the vaccine at a private clinic without government subsidy is RM350. ProtectHealth Corporation Sdn Bhd chief executive officer Dr Anas Alam Faizli also revealed that there had been isolated cases where "anti-vaxxers" had gone to the vaccination centre (PPV) but refused to be vaccinated as they only want to the certificate. Dr Anas Alam noted that there was a proper process, workflow and standard operating procedure observed at the PPV to ensure only a person who is vaccinated will get their information recorded. Malaysia Medical Practitioners Coalition Association president Dr Raj Kumar Maharajah said doctors had increasingly been receiving requests from people asking to be verified as vaccinated even though they declined to get the jab. However, the numbers of those who wish to do so were very small, he said, as most people understand the damage COVID-19 can wreak and want to be protected.

General practitioner Dr Arisman Wenge Abdul Rahman said some of his medical colleagues had been approached to falsify the vaccination status of those who refused to get jabbed. These individuals approach the doctors and boast that they are willing to pay to get the certificates without getting the jabs. "They will come and whisper to the medical personnel at the vaccination centres and ask them to pretend to administer the vaccine," he said, adding that he had not heard of any staff members taking up such an offer to date.

The police have also started investigations into the alleged sale of fake digital vaccination certificates, which was highlighted on social media. In Kedah, it was reported that police had opened an investigation paper on the alleged sale of fake digital vaccination certificates after it was highlighted on social media. While in Penang, the police has not received any reports regarding forged certificates, neither have the Consumer Association of Penang. It was also reported that a senior doctor at Hospital Sultanah Bahiyah posted on Facebook that fake certificates were being sold at RM15 each.

The government has yet to release guidelines on how to spot fake vaccine certificates, but many doctors including Dr Raj Kumar have advised the public not to share images of their certificate online and to call the police if they found out that their certificate has been compromised. As only the certificate in the MySejahtera application is officially recognised, shopkeepers can request the user to scroll their profile page to prove that they are using the application and not a screenshot. The government has released a Vaccine Certificate Verifier app to scan the QR code of the certificate for further verifications. Despite this, there is no clear directive or requirement for shopkeepers or retailers to use it and the app doesn't have any clear indicators of an individual fulfilling the 'fully vaccinated' criteria, despite under current guidelines as of late August 2021, a person who received a two-shot vaccine is only considered "fully vaccinated" two weeks after receiving the second dose while individuals with a single-shot vaccine are only counted "fully vaccinated" 28 days after getting their injection. An alternative would be to cross-check the user's MyKad number with their certificate details.

Following the incident, The Royal Malaysia Police (PDRM) has warned that any eateries that do not adhere to the SOPs, which includes allowing customers that are not fully vaccinated to dine-in will be ordered to cease operations immediately. They have increased joint patrols and inspection of premises.

On 31 August, the chief of the Malaysian Anti-Corruption Commission (MACC) Azam Baki has pledged to investigate claims of doctors receiving bribes from those refusing COVID-19 vaccines in exchange for vaccination certificates. In a statement, Mr Azam said there were claims from the public that doctors or other parties might be offered bribes to issue vaccination certificates even though no vaccines were injected. He added that he viewed such claims seriously. So far, the MACC has not received any complaints related to the issue.

On 8 January 2022, Malaysian police arrested a 51-year-old private clinic doctor from Marang, Terengganu after complaints from the public that the doctor had been selling fake vaccine certificates. A total of 1,900 individuals had dealings with the clinic involving the COVID-19 vaccination and police are still investigating how many of these individuals had bought fake certificates without getting the injections. It was reported that individuals who want a fake vaccine certificate had to pay RM400-RM600 to get a fake certificate without being injected with the vaccine instead of just RM300 to get the actual vaccine. The clinic was allowed to provide vaccines for a fee since September 2021. The police believe that there are individuals from outside the state who purchased fake vaccination certificates from the doctor via online. The doctor is being investigated under Section 420 of the Penal Code and despite being an anti-vaxxer, had already taken the shot.

The Terengganu government had also begun monitoring civil servants for fake vaccine certificates and ordered each department to monitor anti-vaxxers if they acquire fake ceriticates or not. The state government is also leaving it to the police and Health Ministry to flush out any private clinics involving in such activities.

On 12 January 2022, Inspector-General of Police Acryl Sani Abdullah Sani announced that the Royal Malaysia Police would intensify operations and monitoring against parties selling fake vaccination certificates.

On 17 January 2022, news medias reported that 5,601 people have been fraudulently registered on the MySejahtera system. This follows after a raid on a clinic in Gombak, Selangor, which saw the arrest of four men and three women after police investigations into a WhatsApp message that offered fake vaccine certificates. They were being sold for RM500 each. It was reported that the polyclinic received COVID-19 vaccine supply from the health ministry but they were discarded and the empty vials with the broken seals would be returned to the ministry as proof that the shots were administered to avoid any suspicion. The police are investigating the case under Section 269 of the Penal Code for a negligent act that could spread an infectious disease and Section 22 (d) of the Prevention and Control of Infectious Diseases Act 1988.

Despite the strict security protocols for the vaccination process, including the use of blockchain technology on the vaccine digital certificates, the act of injecting the vaccine depends on the integrity of the vaccine administrator, especially in private clinics where the individual and the doctor have the benefit of the privacy in a doctor's examination room.

On 13 January 2022, three civil servants in Alor Gajah, Malacca were arrested over possession of fake MySejahtera COVID-19 digital vaccination certificates for the purpose of obtaining the special finance assistance. It was reported that on 30 December last year, the department head became suspicious of two of the suspects, who were a married couple, and ordered his officer to check the authenticity of the certificates. The officer confirmed from a local health clinic about the status of their certificate and the clinic remarked that the couple were not vaccinated at the clinic. The couple had gotten the fake certificates because it was a precondition to get a bonus apart from avoiding action by the department for refusing to be vaccinated and making it easier for them to enter business premises. They acquired the fake certificate from a colleague, who was a middle man in a COVID-19 vaccination certificate sales syndicate, for RM500 each. The case is being investigated under Section 420 of the Penal Code.

In Kelantan, local police announced that four suspects have been arrested for falsifying COVID-19 vaccination cards linked to a private clinic in Kota Bharu. The clinic offered RM180 for each vaccination card. The local police begin investigation following multiple complains to the local state health department from different sources. The four individuals said that they have taken the vaccine despite no vaccination records in their MySejahtera app.

On 19 January 2022, at a press conference, Johor police chief Commissioner Kamarul Zaman Mamat revealed that eight individuals involved in a syndicate selling fake vaccine digital certificates between RM350 and RM650 each were arrested. The arrests were first made on 17th Jan when the police carried out a series of raids in the city. The syndicate was said to have issued fake certificates to at least 30 people.

Following these incidents, ProtectHealth Corporation Sdn Bhd, a Health Ministry subsidiary that manages the participation of private medical practitioners in the National COVID-19 Immunisation Programme (PICK), said that they will suspend any private medical professionals involved with selling fake certificates. According to the Malaysian Medical Association, ProtectHealth does random audits on participating clinics in PICK. The association also noted that the licence to practice for registered practitioners can be revoked by the Melaysian Medical Council.

=== Vaccine restriction, delay and lack of priority for pregnant women ===
In August 2021, health experts had called on the government to allow pregnant women 33 weeks or more into their pregnancy to be inoculated with the COVID-19 vaccine as there is no evidence of harm from the vaccine towards pregnant woman. Pregnant woman were not considered under any special priority and were placed under phase 3, despite being considered a high risk group for having a higher risk of severe symptoms from COVID-19 during and after pregnancy. This demand for priority to pregnant women also comes after the death of local singer Siti Sarah Raisuddin in early August, who died from COVID-19 just days after giving birth to her child after 28 weeks of pregnancy. She was unvaccinated and merely one of a handful of maternal deaths due to COVID-19. This is also despite Khairy Jamaluddin saying that all vaccines are safe for pregnant woman in June.

On 2 June, pregnant and breastfeeding mothers were able to update their status on the MySejahtera mobile application according to Second Edition of the Clinical Guideline for COVID-19 in Malaysia (published 13 April 2021), it is stated that vaccination for pregnant women can be done between 14 and 33 weeks of pregnancy as well as lactating mothers. The second dose can be administered to a woman who finds out she is pregnant after getting the first dose. However, the second dose should be deferred until 14 weeks of gestation. It took two months for the relevant committee to improve and come up with the Third Edition (published 12 July). However, the guideline on vaccination for pregnant women was retained. The committee continued to ignore the guidelines used in other countries despite the increasing risk of maternal deaths due to COVID-19 in Malaysia. The 2nd Guideline on COVID-19 Vaccination in Pregnancy and Breastfeeding, published by the Ministry of Health on 23 June 2021, also mentions the same policy. Many health experts claim that the 14 to 33 weeks recommendations are baseless and that many other countries allow for woman over 33 weeks pregnancy to have their first dose. The health minister also did not implement walk-in vaccinations for pregnant women.

In an update to their guideline on 10 August 2021, The Ministry of Health recommends COVID-19 vaccination for pregnant women after 12 weeks of pregnancy, while advising informed decision-making for those who want to get inoculated earlier.

=== Sales of fake vaccine ===
There are claims of fake vaccines or scams being sold online via online shopping platforms. The CITF have advised individuals to not buy vaccines as the government supply is free for all.

In May 2021 the Penang government claimed that they were offered 2 million doses of the Sinovac vaccine from a private company and that they shall be handed over to the health minister to be distributed to Penangnites, with excess given to other states. The Penang government however claimed that the federal government was obstructing them from obtaining these vaccines. Inspections by the CITF however found out that the offer was made by a company that did not exist and concluded it as a scam. Khairy Jamaluddin, coordinating minister of the CITF, further questioned how the Penang government could use a fake letter to accuse the Federal government of obstructing the administration of the Sinovac vaccine. The Penang Chief Minister has since apologised over the incident.

=== Choosy recipients ===
Reports of recipients being choosy over which vaccine brand to take also surfaced, particularly among the elderly. Some refused the Chinese made vaccines like Sinovac due to a perceived inferiority to the Chinese vaccine as compared to the other 'gold standard' vaccines like Pfizer, while others refused the Pfizer vaccine due to poor awareness of how the mRNA vaccine works. This hesitancy and choosiness is also fueled by online disinformation. Many also refused the AstraZeneca vaccine due to reports of blood clots from overseas, hence the government created a separate queue for those who wanted it. The government made a statement that all vaccines are effective and those who cancel their appointment will be rescheduled but may still not get what they want.

On 11 July, local singer Ifa Raziah was reported to have cancelled her vaccine appointment when she found out that she was getting Sinovac instead. She was insistent on getting Pfizer and claimed it was due to medical and allergy reasons. The celebrity had come under fire for posting about her vaccine cancellation on her social media. She then removed the initial video on her Instagram but uploaded another one on her Facebook. Social media users have since lambasted her labelling her as choosy when many were still waiting in line for their vaccination dates.

=== People barred from vaccination centre due to strict dress code ===
On 17 July, a woman in Penang was denied entry into at the Kompleks Masyarakat Penyayang vaccination centre her skirt ended slightly above her knees. Apparently there was a strict dress code and a sign of the said dress code is placed outside of the centre and has been stamped by the Northeast District Health Office (PKDTL). The woman was allowed in after her boyfriend spoke to the head of security who overruled the security guard that denied entry. PKDTL officer Datin Dr Azizah Abdul Manan later says there is no such dress code at the vaccination centres and that dressing modestly is sufficient. She says the lady's dress was appropriate.

On 30 August 2021, there have been reports of recipients being denied entry into vaccination centres due overly zealous dress codes such as having a small slit on a below-knee-length skirt. Several women, including pregnant ones, were barred entry at a vaccination in Johor due to this.

Kluang MP Wong Shu Qi shared in a tweet that she received three complaints from both men and women in Kluang who faced similar experiences. The outfits that the three individuals wore were ripped jeans and ankle-length jeans that get shortened when the wearer sits down. These pieces of clothing apparently went against the dress code and were not allowed into PPVs. She has stated that dress code should be abolished to encourage vaccination, while adding that cosplayers wearing dinosaur and superhero costumes are allowed into vaccination centres. Netizens on social media have also agreed with her and were baffled by the need for such dress codes at vaccination centres. The need for strict dress codes for members of the public at government offices, department or institutes is often a hot issue in Malaysia and cases of overzealous enforcement of dress codes is not uncommon, despite backlash from the public and some government officials.

=== Private hospital and general practitioner clinics' involvement in the distribution of vaccines ===
Private general practitioner (GP) clinics have had several issues with the government, CITF and JKJAV in distributing the vaccines.

On 2 April 2021, medical practitioners were urging the government to allow private GP clinics to take part in the distribution of the vaccine as these clinics had better access and trust to the community around them. Even if they do not have the equipment to handle ultra-cold vaccines like Pfizer, they can handle normal ones like Sinovac.

In May 2021, in response to claims that private hospitals and GPs were not involved in the distribution of vaccines, Khairy Jamaluddin says that 500 clinics would be allowed to distribute the vaccines by 15 June and 1000 by 30 June. Khairy noted that private clinics were not roped in due to insufficient vaccine supplies. Khairy added that there are currently 2,500 GP clinics that have registered to aid the national immunisation programme. Of the 2,500 GPs, he said 1,800 had already attended an onboarding programme to administer the vaccines.

In the same month, ProtectHealth, an incorporated entity appointed by the Ministry of Health to manage Private Medical Practitioners participation in the COVID-19 vaccination programme has issued a statement urging all private clinics and hospitals to stop advertising that they are offering vaccinations at their clinic. While several private clinics have been selected to participate under the national immunisation programme, they are not allowed to publicly advertise and to collect registrations via WhatsApp. This is to avoid causing unnecessary confusion and misunderstanding among the public. ProtectHealth partner private clinics are basically additional vaccination centres under the National Immunisation Programme.

On 1 June, The Malaysian Medical Association (MMA) said there has been a lack of engagement with private general practitioners (GPs) on their involvement in the national COVID-19 immunisation programme. The association had written to the coordinating minister in-charge of COVID-19 vaccination Khairy Jamaluddin early March this year seeking a meeting to discuss the matter, but did not receive a reply from the ministry or JKJAV. Dr Subramaniam Muniandy, president of the MMA, pointed out in his statement that the GPs that had undergone the onboarding programme were supposed to begin vaccinating in early May but were left hanging pending a go-ahead from the government.

At the same time, a private general practitioner (GP) clinics association has said that bureaucracy and logistical problems were still hampering this class of physicians from supporting the effort. In a recent interview with Malay Mail, Federation of Private Medical Practitioners Association (FPMPAM) president Dr Steven Chow Kim Weng recounted the "hassle" private healthcare operators faced in order to be certified as a qualified vaccinator under the NIP. This also comes after NIP coordinating minister Khairy Jamaluddin said only 2,467 GPs have registered for the cause to date. GPs were required to attend training with ProtectHealth Corporation Sdn Bhd (ProtectHealth), during which they would be subsequently informed of the different parties involved in the overall vaccination chain. After attending the training, GPs must obtain approval from the Health Ministry's Private Medical Practice Control Section (CKAPS) responsible for auditing private clinics. CKAPS would determine whether they fulfill several prerequisites — sufficient Personal Protection Equipment (PPEs) and vaccination equipment, suitability of premises and patients' flow plans during the vaccination process, before designating them as vaccination centres. Then, the clinics must go on to get further approvals from their respective state health departments. With both approvals in hand, a GP would then need to liaise with the MySejahtera app to obtain a list of named individuals to be vaccinated, ranging from 50 to 55 people that are provided on a weekly basis. Finally, with approvals and name list now in possession, the respective GPs would need to liaise with the Health Ministry's Pharmaceutical Services Programme at the nearest vaccine storage facilities to provide the indent for COVID-19 vaccines based on the list from MySejahtera before collecting the vaccines for inoculation. Many had questioned the need for such a tedious and bureaucratic process to be approved for vaccination distribution. It was also revealed that all logistical aspects of the immunisation programme have to be shouldered by the respective GPs, which includes transporting the vaccines and purchasing the specialised medical equipment needed. Accordingly, the estimated costs of new equipment that GPs were required to procure include medical-grade vaccine cooler box costing between RM800 to RM1,200 each, electronic temperature data logger costing between RM100 and RM150 each and varying traveling expenditures incurred during vaccine collection. On top of that, the government has not provided any subsidies or grants for GPs to offset such expenses beyond the incentive of RM14 per vaccine dose administered, which led to hesitancy among certain association members. Under the vaccination drive, GPs were required to personally collect the vaccine doses on a specific day with their own cold boxes. Many medical practitioners want a change in the system, ideally, any patient could walk in to their respective GPs, get assessed, have their jabs and update their data on MySejahtera in a single uninterrupted process.

The MMA had also called out the government for the need for such a hectic process, especially the audit done by state JKJAV, which is slowing down the COVID-19 vaccine rollout at GP clinics. MMA honorary general secretary Dr R. Arasu said that the audits were ordered by the state JKJAV and that neither CKAPS nor MOH has anything to do with it. Dr Arasu explained that only less than a third of the 8,000 GPs nationwide have signed up to participate in the national coronavirus inoculation drive due to a "confusing" implementation process, saying: "With more clarity, more GPs will participate."

As of 21, 2 June weeks after private hospitals were allowed to distribute vaccines, it was reported that over 1 million doses have been given. Despite this, there was no indication from the government that private hospitals and clinics will be allowed to purchase vaccines on their own as the vaccine being distributed are from the government's stock.

On 3 August, A private hospital doctor, Dr Musa Nordin, has launched a scathing attack on Malaysia's COVID-19 vaccination programme, accusing the Special Committee for Ensuring Access to COVID-19 Vaccine Supply (JKJAV) not only of flip-flopping, but also of corruption. He also asked why the National Pharmaceutical Regulatory Agency (NPRA), the main drug approval authority under the health ministry, had yet to give the green light for the Moderna vaccine. The doctor criticised what he called the "flip-flop" policies of the vaccines committee on administering jabs to teenagers, as well as on the procurement of the Sinovac vaccine. His comments drew strong reactions from the public as well as from veteran doctors. On 5 August, Malaysia granted conditional approval on the use of Moderna vaccine.

==== CITF's decision to stop private GPs from distributing vaccines ====
On 21 August, it was reported that the CITF decided to stop vaccination appointments at 741 private GP clinics, several private hospitals and ambulatory care centres in Selangor. CITF informed private GPs via a circular issued by ProtectHealth (ProtectHealth Corporation Sdn Bhd) that private GPs giving private vaccinations will not be allowed to give vaccinations under the immunisation program without any reason. Many medical practitioners were baffled by the CITF's decisions and had called out the CITF for such actions, especially when the country is in its last leg to achieving 80% herd immunity.

Health director general Tan Sri Dr Noor Hisham Abdullah also tweeted that the decision to stop GPs from administering vaccines was against his advice.

The CITF had responded, saying that it is because a majority of those in the Klang Valley and that the GP involvement in the vaccine distribution is based on current needs. They also stated that they may re-engage with private GPs in the future when mega vaccination centres have ceased.

Despite this, president of the Malaysian Medical Association Subramaniam Muniandy have called out the CITF for such policies of use when needed and dump when not needed will not augur well and discourage other GPs from participating. He commented that since the vaccination has picked up, the CITF should phase out the mega PPVs and allow GPs to run PICK's final lap while the government strengthens its resources at public healthcare facilities. Most people find it more convenient to go to a private GP for their vaccination as private clinics are close to the community and not crowded.

== See also ==
- Malaysian movement control order
- COVID-19 pandemic in Malaysia
