= Timeline of the COVID-19 pandemic in Malaysia (2023) =

The following is a timeline of the COVID-19 pandemic in Malaysia during 2023.

== Timeline ==
=== January ===
Date	Cases		Recoveries		Deaths		Current cases			Sources
Date	New	Total	New	Total	New	Total	Active	ICU	Ventilators	Sources
1	420	5,027,097	547	4,978,369	4	7,854	11,871	30	9	
2	360	5,027,457	423	4,978,792	1	36,858	11,807	30	16	
3	333	5,027,790	376	4,979,168	1	36,859	11,763	32	20	
4	433	5,028,223	500	4,979,668	0	36,859	11,696	31	21	
5	571	5,028,794	696	4,980,364	7	36,866	11,564	38	18	
6	543	5,029,337	688	4,981,052	4	36,870	11,415	33	14	
7	571	5,029,908	551	4,981,603	4	36,874	11,431	34	15	
8	405	5,030,313	441	4,982,044	1	36,875	11,394	32	12	
9	383	5,030,696	355	4,982,399	8	36,883	11,414	28	11	
10	380	5,031,076	373	4,982,772	9	36,892	11,412	26	11	
11	367	5,031,443	398	4,983,170	9	36,901	11,372	24	12	
12	383	5,031,826	625	4,983,795	4	36,905	11,126	20	8	
13	320	5,032,146	506	4,984,301	3	36,908	10,937	17	5	
14	287	5,032,433	590	4,984,891	0	36,908	10,634	20	7	
15	244	5,032,677	401	4,985,292	0	36,908	10,477	20	9	
16	227	5,032,904	367	4,985,659	6	36,914	10,331	21	9	
17	350	5,033,254	349	4,986,008	5	36,919	10,327	16	8	
18	371	5,033,625	304	4,986,312	4	36,923	10,390	16	14	
19	318	5,033,943	331	4,986,643	0	36,923	10,377	19	15	
20	285	5,034,228	300	4,986,943	7	36,930	10,355	16	14	
21	293	5,034,521	326	4,987,269	2	36,932	10,320	12	10	
22	309	5,034,830	292	4,987,561	0	36,932	10,337	13	10	
23	142	5,034,972	267	4,987,828	0	36,932	10,212	16	11	
24	101	5,035,073	315	4,988,143	0	36,932	9,998	12	10	
25	132	5,035,205	346	4,988,489	1	36,933	9,783	11	10	
26	172	5,035,377	325	4,988,814	3	36,936	9,627	13	10	
27	236	5,035,613	312	4,989,126	2	36,938	9,549	14	11	
28	258	5,035,871	309	4,989,435	2	36,490	9,496	17	14	
29	269	5,036,140	285	4,989,720	0	36,940	9,480	21	14	
30	202	5,036,342	141	4,989,861	2	36,942	9,539	23	12	
31	251	5,036,593	0	4,989,861	0	36,942	9,790	15	9	

On 3 January, Health Minister Dr Zaliha Mustafa announced several measures to curb rising cases as travel increased including testing all overseas travellers for fever and offering walk-in vaccinations at hospitals and clinics from 9 January.

On 4 January, Sabah's State Local Government and Housing Minister Datuk Seri Masidi Manjun announced that all travellers from China would have to be fully vaccinated against COVID-19 and had to present a negative COVID-19 test.

On 10 January, the Ministry of Health confirmed that the Immigration Department would be screening travellers from China for COVID-19 in response to an outbreak in China.

On 12 January, Menteri Besar of Selangor Datuk Seri Amirudin Shari stated that the Selangor state government was considering stepping up COVID-19 prevention measures including contact tracing measures if the number of cases in the state rose. He also encouraged residents to take booster doses. That same day, Dr Mustafa confirmed that Malaysia would not be closing its borders since the COVID-19 situation in the country was under control. However, border screenings would continue.

On 13 January, the states of Sarawak and Kedah began screening the temperatures of travellers entering their borders.

On 27 January, The Star reported that Penang state had only reported a total of 235 new cases between 12 and 25 January 2023. Only one of the state's 92 mukim (or sub-districts) remained a red-zone.

On 29 January, the Ministry of Health confirmed that 9,088 of the 9,480 active cases were undergoing home quarantine. In addition 371 individuals (3.9%) were hospitalised with 21 of these cases undergoing intensive care.

=== February ===
Date	Cases		Recoveries		Deaths		Current cases			Sources
Date	New	Total	New	Total	New	Total	Active	ICU	Ventilators	Sources
1	325	5,036,918	113	4,990,079	0	36,942	9,897	14	9	
2	324	5,037,242	148	4,990,227	0	36,942	10,073	12	6	
3	340	5,037,582	203	4,990,430	0	36,942	10,210	8	5	
4	202	5,037,784	275	4,990,705	1	36,943	10,136	6	6	
5	211	5,037,995	272	4,990,977	0	36,943	10,075	10	8	
6	175	5,038,170	196	4,991,173	1	36,944	10,053	6	5	
7	184	5,038,354	253	4,991,426	2	36,946	9,982	4	4	
8	189	5,038,543	279	4,991,705	0	36,946	9,892	7	4	
9	269	5,038,812	375	4,992,080	0	36,946	9,786	8	4	
10	255	5,039,067	306	4,992,386	4	36,950	9,731	12	5	
11	259	5,039,326	390	4,992,776	1	36,951	9,599	11	4	
12	160	5,039,486	358	4,993,134	0	36,951	9,401	9	4	
13	164	5,039,650	254	4,993,388	1	36,952	9,310	11	6	
14	200	5,039,850	155	4,993,543	1	36,953	9,354	11	5	
15	237	5,040,087	215	4,993,758	1	36,954	9,375	8	4	
16	281	5,040,368	257	4,994,015	0	36,954	9,399	8	2	
17	241	5,040,609	235	4,994,250	0	36,954	9,405	9	3	
18	212	5,040,821	310	4,994,560	1	36,955	9,306	6	3	
19	186	5,041,007	158	4,994,718	1	36,956	9,333	7	4	
20	167	5,041,174	169	4,994,888	1	36,957	9,330	9	6	
21	184	5,041,358	192	4,995,079	0	36,957	9,322	8	6	
22	229	5,041,587	227	4,995,306	0	36,957	9,324	8	6	
23	224	5,041,811	278	4,995,584	0	36,957	9,270	9	7	
24	204	5,042,015	254	4,995,838	0	36,957	9,220	9	6	
25	173	5,042,188	219	4,996,057	0	36,957	9,174	12	7	
26	207	5,042,395	175	4,996,232	0	36,957	9,206	10	6	
27	190	5,042,585	177	4,996,409	0	36,957	9,219	6	3	
28	206	5,042,791	176	4,996,585	1	36,958	9,248	7	3	

On 10 February, Health Minister Mustafa confirmed that the Health Ministry would establish a task force to write a White Paper on the COVID-19 vaccine procurement practices of previous Malaysian governments.

On 13 February, Director-General of Health Noor Hisham Abdullah confirmed that COVID-19 data would potentially be released on a weekly rather than daily basis from March 2023.

On 16 February, the Sabah state government confirmed that it would change the frequency of its COVID-19 statements from daily updates to weekly updates issued on Monday.

=== March ===
Date	Cases		Recoveries		Deaths		Current cases			Sources
Date	New	Total	New	Total	New	Total	Active	ICU	Ventilators	Sources
1	217	5,043,008	233	4,996,818	2	36,960	9,230	7	3	
2	244	5,043,252	213	4,997,031	5	36,965	9,256	7	2	
3	204	5,043,456	213	4,997,244	0	36,965	9,247	6	1	
4	170	5,043,626	178	4,997,422	0	36,965	9,239	4	1	
5	164	5,043,790	198	4,997,620	1	36,966	9,204	2	0	
6	188	5,043,978	181	4,997,801	0	36,966	9,211	2	0	
7	226	5,044,204	202	4,998,003	0	36,966	9,235	4	0	
8	235	5,044,439	216	4,998,219	1	36,967	9,253	6	1	
9	279	5,044,718	236	4,998,455	0	36,967	9,296	5	1	
10	251	5,044,969	197	4,998,652	0	36,967	9,350	6	2	
11	223	5,045,192	193	4,998,845	0	36,967	9,380	4	1	
18	270	5,047,040	235	5,000,411	3	36,972	9,657	8	4	
25	355	5,049,268	257	5,002,242	7	36,979	10,047	11	7	

On 4 March, Health Minister Zainal Mustafa confirmed that three COVID-19 cases had been detected among flood victims in the state of Johor and quarantined in hospitals.

On 20 March, the Terrengganu Islamic Religious and Malay Customs Council (Maidam) eliminated facemask requirements for all mosque and surau attendees in the state.

On 29 March, Penang General Hospital infectious diseases unit head Datuk Dr Chow Ting Soo advised high-risk individuals including those with comorbidities to wear face masks to protect against various infectious diseases including the Omicron variant of COVID-19.

=== April ===
Date	Cases		Recoveries		Deaths		Current cases			Sources
Date	New	Total	New	Total	New	Total	Active	ICU	Ventilators	Sources
1	599	5,052,337	375	5,004,043	1	36,982	11,312	13	9	
8	726	5,056,911	584	5,006,634	16	36,994	13,283	10	4	
15	881	5,062,060	760	5,010,543	4	37,000	14,517	14	10	
22	562	5,066,877	881	5,015,705	11	37,011	14,161	16	12	
29	1,050	5,071,840	600	5,020,529	9	37,020	14,291	29	22	

By 6 April, 458 patients had been hospitalised, with 13 in intensive care and 9 on ventilator support.

On 7 April, the Health Ministry approved the use of AstraZeneca's Evusheld 100mg/ml solution for treating COVID-19 patients.

On 11 April, Kedah state's Health and Local Government Committee chairman Datuk Dr Mohd Hayati Othman advised the public to wear masks in public spaces after COVID-19 cases increased by 141.4 percent (or 169 cases) during the first week of the month.

On 14 April, Melaka's State Health director Datuk Dr Rusdi Abd Rahman reported 226 cases at three boarding schools in the state.

On 17 April, in response to rising cases and social gatherings during the Hari Raya Puasa period, several public health experts including Universiti Kebangsaan Malaysia Prof Dr Sharifa Ezat Wan Puteh, Universiti Malaya Professor Dr Moy Foong Ming, and Malaysian Public Health Physicians Association president Datuk Dr Zainal Ariffin Omar, and Universiti Putra Malaysia medical epidemiologist Assoc Prof Dr Malina Osman advocated various health measures including booster vaccines, mask wearing, and for positive cases to isolate at home.

On 25 April, Health Minister Zainal Mustafa confirmed that the SARS-CoV-2 XBB.1.16 (Arcturus) viral subvariant had arrived in Malaysia. 12 cases were reported; with six in Sarawak, four in Selangor and two in Kuala Lumpur.

On 28 April, Health Minister Zainal encouraged school students to wear face masks when returning to school the following week.

=== May ===
Date	Cases		Recoveries		Deaths		Current cases			Sources
Date	New	Total	New	Total	New	Total	Active	ICU	Ventilators	Sources
6	1,110	5,079,436	1,112	5,025,566	0	37,028	16,842	41	24	
13	1,205	5,088,009	1,248	5,029,873	18	37,046	21,090	36	25	
20	786	5,094,448	1,272	5,038,256	3	37,070	19,122	34	25	
27	782	5,100,249	779	5,044,652	1	37,087	18,510	30	24	

In early May 2023, the Straits Times reported a fresh wave of cases in Malaysia during the second half of April. By 29 April, the number of hospitalisations had risen by 9.2% to 3,381; the death toll had risen by 25%; and the hospital occupancy rate had risen by 70.3%.

On 8 May, Health Minister Dr Zaliha Mustafa announced that COVID-19 would no longer be considered a public health emergency, citing a recent decision by the World Health Organization's Emergency Committee of the International Health Regulations (2005) on 4 May.

On 16 May, Sabah's Tuaran district was placed back in the "red zone" after recording a spike of 26 cases in the previous week (7 to 13 May).

On 23 May, Sarawak's Deputy Premier Dr Sim Kui Hian announced that the COVID-19 pandemic in his state was declining, citing lower mortality figures in 2023 compared with last year. At the time, Sarawak had reported nine COVID-19 deaths in 2023, with a mortality rate of 0.31 per 100,000 people. In 2022, Sarawak had reported 167 COVID-19 deaths, with a mortality rate of 5.41 per 100,000 people.

=== June ===
Date	Cases		Recoveries		Deaths		Current cases			Sources
Date	New	Total	New	Total	New	Total	Active	ICU	Ventilators	Sources
2	569	5,104,772	845	5,050,356	13	37,100	17,316	22	15	
10	618	5,108,586	626	5,053,329	10	37,110	18,147	13	7	
17	400	5,112,019	630	5,057,145	8	37,118	17,756	15	12	
24	341	5,114,717	541	5,061,264	9	37,127	16,326	16	9	

On 2 June, Health Minister Dr Zaliha Mustafa confirmed that the Government would revise the COVID-19 Standard Operation Procedure (SOP) in mid-June following the World Health Organization's decision to no longer categorise the disease as a global health emergency.

By 8 June, the Malaysian Government had spent RM4.482 billion on vaccine procurement and logistics.

On 16 June, the Health Minister Dr Zaliha reported that the number of COVID-19 cases had decreased by 15.7% between 4 and 10 June; 3,814 cases compared with 4,523 cases reported in the previous week.

On 29 June, Dr Zaliha announced that the Malaysian Government was eliminating facemask requirements on public transportation and healthcare facilities, and reducing the quarantine period from seven to five days, effective 5 July. This announcement came in response to declining local cases and the World Health Organization declaring that COVID-19 was no longer a Public Health Emergency of International Concern (PHEIC). The Health Minister also extended the status of local "Infectious endemic area" from 30 June to 31 December 2023.

=== July ===
Date	Cases		Recoveries		Deaths		Current cases			Sources
Date	New	Total	New	Total	New	Total	Active	ICU	Ventilators	Sources
1	171	5,116,265	333	5,064,159	2	37,152	14,954	11	8	
8	139	5,117,487	167	5,066,437	6	37,158	13,892	9	4	
15	173	5,118,689	141	5,067,662	2	37,160	13,867	4	4	
22	129	5,119,647	189	5,068,858	3	37,163	13,626	20	5	
29	130	5,120,581	115	5,069,820	1	37,164	13,597	2	0	

On 1 July, Universiti Sains Islam Malaysia family medicine specialist Assoc Prof Dr Mohd Radzniwan Abd Rashid and Universiti Putra Malaysia public health practitioner Assoc Prof Dr Malina Osman welcomed the Government's decision to revise its standard operation procedures, citing the World Health Organization's decision to declare that COVID-19 was no longer a global health emergency.

On 7 July, Universiti Kebangsaan Malaysia public health specialist Prof Dr Sharifa Ezat Wan Puteh advocated mask-wearing as a means of preventing COVID-19 and other respiratory infections.

The number of COVID-19 cases dropped by 20 per cent during the week between 16 and 22 July to 958 cases compared to 1,202 cases between 9 and 15 July.

=== August ===
Date	Cases		Recoveries		Deaths		Current cases			Sources
Date	New	Total	New	Total	New	Total	Active	ICU	Ventilators	Sources
5	105	5,121,276	128	5,070,750	1	37,165	13,361	4	1	
12	73	5,121,858	96	5,072,092	0	37,165	12,601	1	1	
19	114	5,122,568	65	5,072,678	0	37,165	12,725	3	1	
26	90	5,123,264	111	5,073,384	0	37,165	12,715	0	0	

During the 2023 Malaysian state elections, COVID-19 positive votes received guidelines via the MySejahtera app on how to fulfill their voting responsibilities.

=== September ===
Date	Cases		Recoveries		Deaths		Current cases			Sources
Date	New	Total	New	Total	New	Total	Active	ICU	Ventilators	Sources
2	57	5,123,801	97	5,074,097	0	37,165	12,539	11	4	
9	108	5,124,481	53	5,076,104	2	37,167	11,210	1	0	
16	91	5,125,209	116	5,076,796	4	37,171	11,242	2	0	
23	87	5,125,900	89	5,077,516	1	37,172	11,212	2	0	
30	97	5,126,683	91	5,078,210	3	37,175	11,298	3	1	

=== October ===
Date	Cases		Recoveries		Deaths		Current cases			Sources
Date	New	Total	New	Total	New	Total	Active	ICU	Ventilators	Sources
7	142	5,127,616	91	5,078,992	2	37,177	11,447	1	1	
14	181	5,128,668	131	5,079,933	2	37,179	11,556	0	1	
21	157	5,129,800	176	5,080,973	2	37,181	11,646	5	2	
28	207	5,131,139	151	5,082,106	0	37,181	11,852	4	4	

=== November ===
Date	Cases		Recoveries		Deaths		Current cases			Sources
Date	New	Total	New	Total	New	Total	Active	ICU	Ventilators	Sources
4	262	5,132,831	810	5,084,061	5	37,186	11,584	4	3	

Malaysia reported 2,305 cases between 12 and 18 November, a 28% increase from the previous week. These included 28 new Omicron variant cases.

=== December ===
Date	Cases		Recoveries		Deaths		Current cases			Sources
Date	New	Total	New	Total	New	Total	Active	ICU	Ventilators	Sources
2	1,126	5,147,359	610	5,094,830	0	37,202	15,327	8	5	
9	2,554	5,160,116	1,164	5,102,881	16	37,218	20,017	21	13	
16	3,389	5,180,812	2,276	5,115,191	28	37,246	28,375	22	14	
23	3,499	5,206,724	3,376	5,136,171	22	37,268	33,285	44	22	
30	2,803	5,227,322	3,488	5,162,135	5	37,293	27,894	58	34	

In response to a rise of COVID-19 cases, retirement homes and the Kedah Immigration Department reinstated face mask requirements. In addition, mask wearing was encouraged in mosques, suraus, retailers, eateries, and kindergartens. On 20 December, the Health Ministry also encouraged people to take the COVID-19 vaccines, publishing a list of 234 vaccination centres on the MySejahtera app.

On 21 December, Malaysia reactivated its Heightened Alert System in response to a surge in COVID-19 cases domestically and in the wider Southeast Asia region. That same day, Johor state reported a 20-fold increase in COVID-19 cases. The Sarawak government also approved RM 4.85 million to help the Health Department cope with rising COVID-19 cases.

On 27 December, the Government deployed health department officials and medical staff at flood evacuation centres in Terengganu to screen people for COVID-19.

On 28 December, Kedah health authorities confirmed that the situation was under control at two COVID-19 clusters in Kuala Muda and Kota Setar.

On 29 December, the Health Ministry stated that COVID-19 cases in Malaysia were under control, with only 0.5% of patients admitted to hospital and a death rate of 0.08%.

On 30 December, 14 new COVID-19 cases were reported at flood evacuation centres in Kelantan and Terengganu.
