= Volunteer Smartphone Patrol =

Mobile app developed by the Royal Malaysia Police

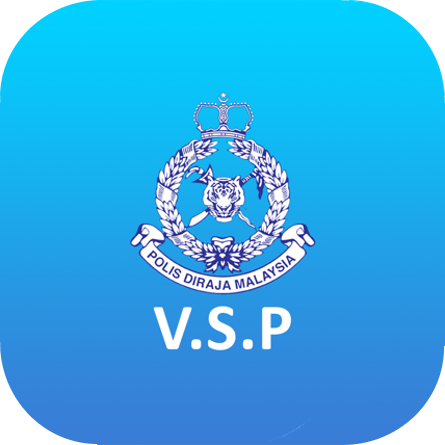
- Developer: Government of Malaysia
- Release: 3 June 2016; 10 years ago
- Stable release: 2.4(18) / 20 February 2024; 2 years ago
- Operating system: Android 8.0 or later iOS 16.0 or later
- Available in: Malay, English, Chinese, Tamil
- Website: www.rmp.gov.my

Volunteer Smartphone Patrol (abbreviated as VSP or V.S.P) is a mobile app developed by the Royal Malaysia Police. It was made for civilian use to collaborate with the police by becoming informants to combat crime.

== History ==
The mobile app was first released on 22 March 2017 in Google Play and 3 June 2016 in Apple App Store, it was introduced as an 'initiative by the Royal Malaysia Police to create collaboration between civilians and cops.'

Starting in the year 2024, during Chinese New Year celebrations, the mobile app which was updated to version 2.0 was widely publicised by local media for featuring an option for users to report their absence from their residence during holiday season and have police conduct daily patrols until their return.

== Features ==
=== Complaint ===
Users can make a complete complaint without needing to be present in police stations. Users are able to enter the address where the incident happened, complaint details and attachments (photos and videos) of the incident. Users that provide false information or abuse the system can and will be subjected to police investigation.

=== Outstation (Malay: Balik Kampung) ===
Users can report their absence from their residence during long periods of time (commonly known as outstation or (Malay: Balik Kampung)). Users will only need to key in their departure date and return date and optionally pictures of their residence. The information would later be passed on to the residence's district police and police units would be dispatched daily to patrol the residence until their return.

=== Panic Button ===
A panic button is also present in the mobile app.

== See also ==
- Royal Malaysia Police
- MySejahtera
