= MySejahtera =

Malaysian COVID-19 app

- Developers: Entomo Malaysia; Government of Malaysia
- Release: 16 April 2020; 6 years ago
- Operating system: Android 7.1 or later iOS 13 or later HarmonyOS 2.0 or later
- Available in: English and Malay
- Type: COVID-19 apps
- Website: mysejahtera.moh.gov.my/en/

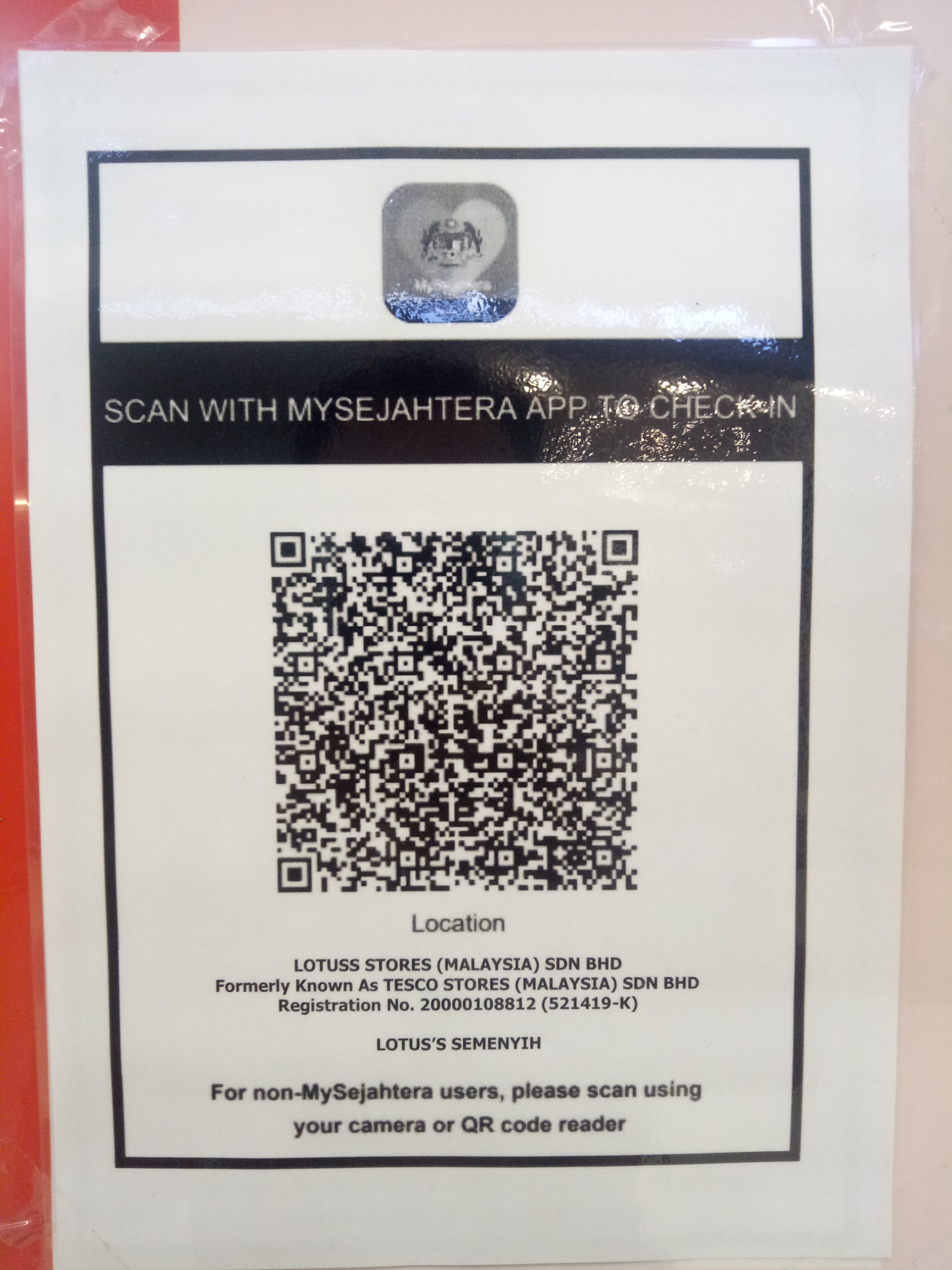
A MySejahtera QR code in one of Lotus's stores that was used for contact tracing

MySejahtera is a mobile app developed by Entomo Malaysia (formerly known as KPISoft) and the Government of Malaysia to manage the COVID-19 outbreak in Malaysia. It can be used to conduct contact tracing, self-quarantine, and also book COVID-19 vaccination appointments.

== History ==
MySejahtera was developed by Entomo Malaysia (formerly KPISoft Malaysia), a local developer founded by Anuar Rozhan and Raveenderan Ramamoothie, with strategic cooperation from the National Security Council (NSC), the Ministry of Health (MOH), the Malaysian Administrative Modernisation and Management Planning Unit (MAMPU), the Malaysian Communications and Multimedia Commission (MCMC), and the Ministry of Science and Technology (MOSTI). Launched by then Health Minister Adham Baba on 20 April 2020, the MySejahtera app can be downloaded from the App Store, Google Play, Huawei AppGallery, and the Gallery of Malaysian Government Mobile Applications (GAMMA).

On 19 November 2020, Director General Noor Hisham Abdullah confirmed that 9,167 COVID-19 cases had been identified by the MySejahtera app since its launch in April 2020 via contact tracing methods including local district health offices using MySejahtera's database and the tracking of potential close contacts of COVID-19 patients.

By 27 August 2021, 1.9 million of the 2.32 million students aged between 12 and 17 years enrolled at Malaysian national schools worldwide had registered for COVID-19 vaccinations via the MySejahtera app.

In early November 2021, Health Minister Khairy Jamaluddin stated that the MySejahtera app would not be used for moral policing in response to Leader of the Opposition Anwar Ibrahim's claim that the MySejahtera app showed Muslims checking into gaming outlets.

On 7 November 2021, the MySejahtera app experienced a glitch that caused it to incorrectly issue the "home surveillance order" (HSO) and "person under surveillance" (PUS) statuses to several users. The app's administrators apologised to the public for the panic they caused. That same day, the United States Embassy in Kuala Lumpur confirmed that Malaysians travelling to the US could show their proof of vaccination on the MySejatera app, as well as a negative COVID-19 test.

On 27 April 2022, Health Minister Khairy Jamaluddin announced that scanning the MySejahtera QR code when entering premises is no longer compulsory beginning 1 May 2022. According to data released by the Health Ministry's GitHub portal, MySejahtera app usage had plunged 73.8% by 3 May.

On 26 May 2022, Khairy Jamaluddin announced that, in light of the 2022 monkeypox outbreak, MySejahtera users coming from countries with reported cases of monkeypox would be sent an alert on the MySejahtera app starting 27 May 2022. This was done to prevent an outbreak of monkeypox in Malaysia.

On 10 August 2023, the Malaysian Health Ministry and Election Commission confirm that COVID-19 positive votes will receive guidelines via the MySejahtera app on how to fulfill their voting responsibilities during the 2023 Malaysian state elections.

On 5 July 2024, the Health Ministry ended its policy of requiring COVID-19 positive individuals to report their COVID-19 self-test results to the MySejahtera app.

== Contact tracing ==
The main function of the MySejahtera app is to assist the department in managing and mitigating the COVID-19 outbreak, enable users to monitor their health condition throughout the COVID-19 outbreak, assist users in getting treatment immediately if they are diagnosed with COVID-19 disease, and locate the nearest health facilities for COVID-19 screening and treatment. It is also widely used in the country for checking in when visiting a new place via the QR code scanning method, and is now also used for COVID-19 vaccine registrations. MySJ Trace is an extension of MySejahtera that uses Bluetooth Low Energy to scan for other users in proximity and alert the user if they have had contact with a COVID-19 patient.

== See also ==
- COVID-19 vaccination in Malaysia
- COVID-19 apps
- Volunteer Smartphone Patrol
