= Disability in Malaysia =

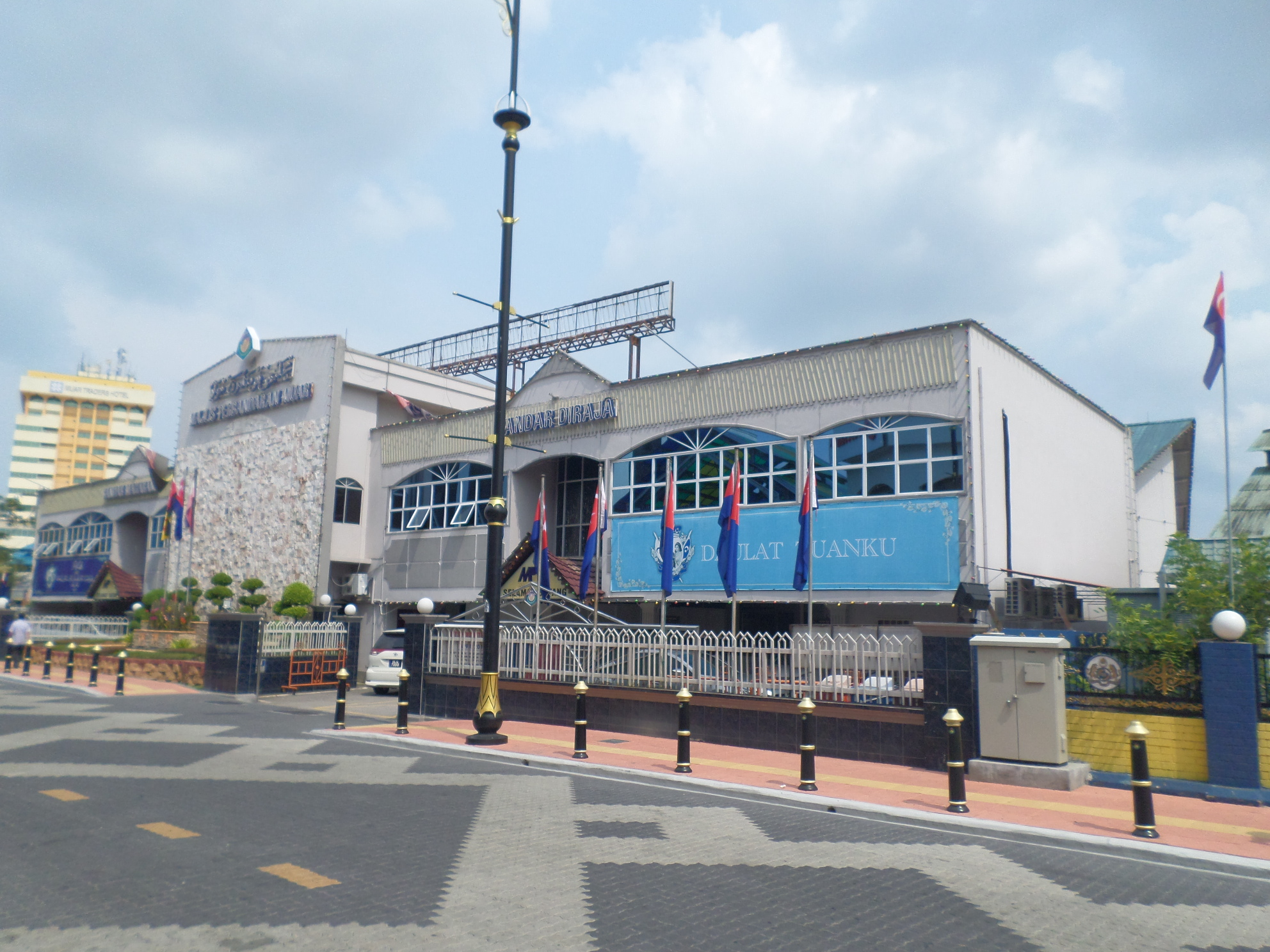
Tactile paving in Muar, Johor for the visually impaired.

Disability in Malaysia refers to the people with disability in Malaysia (Malay: Orang Kurang Upaya or OKU). As of June 2024, there are 707,242 registered disabled persons in Malaysia with various category of disability. The country is a state party to the United Nations' Convention on the Rights of Persons with Disabilities, having signed on 8 April 2008 and ratified the treaty on 19 July 2010.

== Categories ==
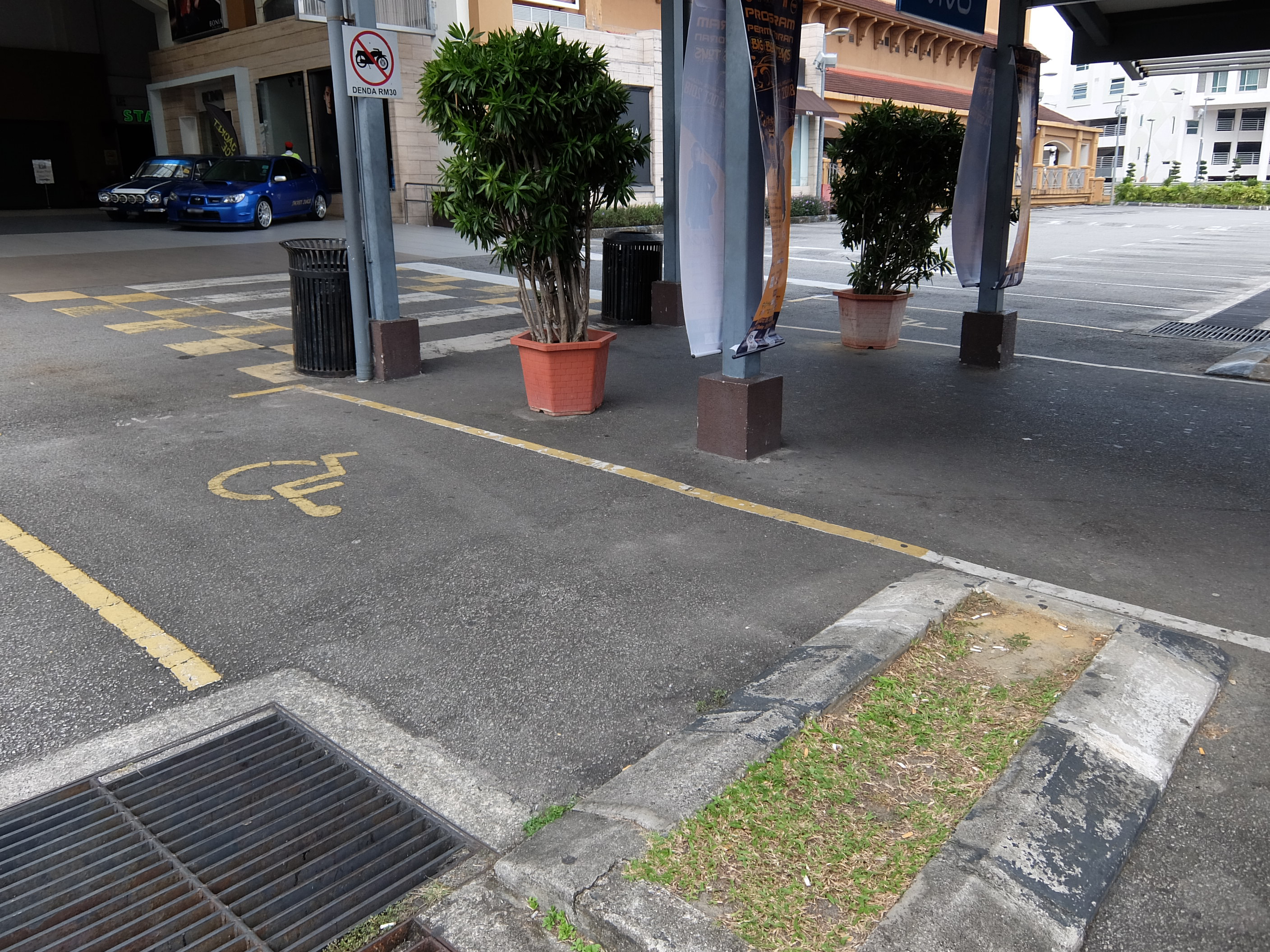
Dedicated parking lot for the mobility impaired in Melaka City, Melaka.

The Department of Social Welfare Malaysia lists disabilities into seven categories, which are hearing, visual, speaking, physical, learning, mental and multiple disabilities.

== Law ==
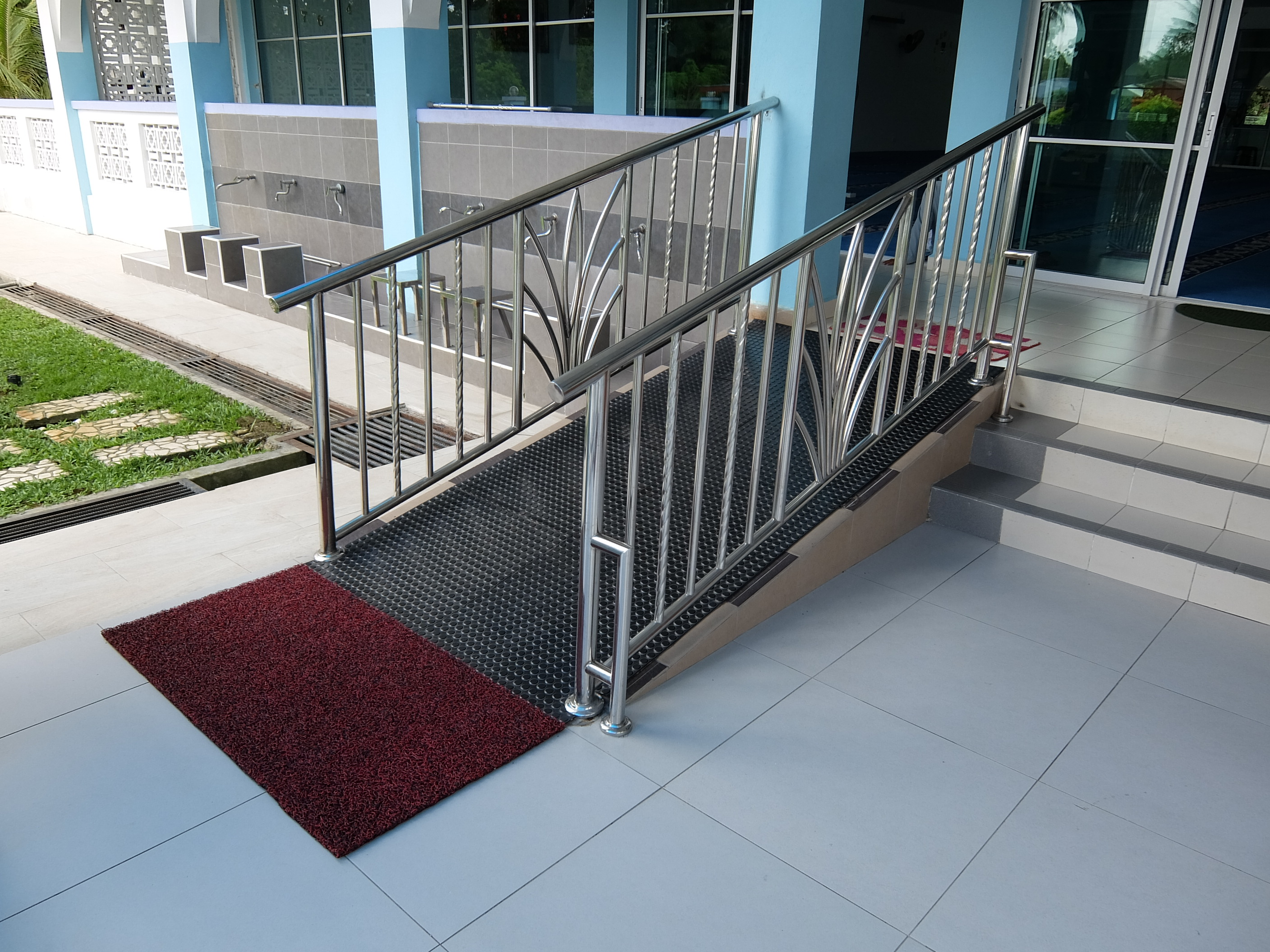
Wheelchair ramp at a mosque in Pontian, Johor.

In 2008, the Parliament of Malaysia passed the Persons with Disabilities Act (PWDA) to ensure access for disabled people to public facilities, transportation, recreation, leisure and sport services.

== National-level organisations ==
- Alzheimer's Disease Foundation of Malaysia
- Kiwanis Disability Information and Support Centre
- Malaysia Information Network for the Disabled
- Malaysian Association for the Blind
- Malaysian Braille Press
- Malaysian Federation of the Deaf
- Malaysian Confederation of the Disabled
- Malaysian Mental Health Association
- Malaysian Mentalink Foundation
- Malaysian Parkinson's Disease Association
- Malaysian Spinal Injury Association
- National Council for the Blind, Malaysia

== See also ==
- Healthcare in Malaysia
