= Responses to the COVID-19 pandemic in June 2021 =

Aspect of viral disease pandemic

This article documents the chronology of the response to the COVID-19 pandemic in June 2021, which originated in Wuhan, China in December 2019. Some developments may become known or fully understood only in retrospect. Reporting on this pandemic began in December 2019.

== Reactions and measures in the United Nations ==
=== 1 June ===
- The World Health Organization has approved China's Sinovac CoronaVac COVID-19 vaccine for emergency use, allowing the vaccine to be used in the global COVAX programme.

== Reactions and measures in the Americas ==
=== 15 June ===
- Governor Baker of Massachusetts terminated the COVID-19 State of Emergency effective 15 June.

== Reactions and measures in the Eastern Mediterranean ==
=== 18 June ===
- The Israeli Government has announced plans to transfer at least one million doses of the Pfizer–BioNTech COVID-19 vaccine to the Palestinian Authority. These vaccines are scheduled to expire soon.
- The Palestinian Authority later cancelled the agreement with Israel to transfer at least one million doses of the Pfizer-BioNTech COVID-19 vaccine to the West Bank. In justifying the cancellation, Palestinian Health Minister Mai al-Kaila stated that the vaccines' expiry dates were close and that the Palestinian Authority had rejected Israeli demands that none of the vaccines be transferred to the Hamas–run Gaza Strip and that the contract not be signed by the State of Palestine.

== Reactions and measures in Europe ==
=== 15 June ===
- Italy becomes one of the countries to adopt a second vaccine dose that is not from the same manufacturer as the first dose.

== Reactions and measures in South, East and Southeast Asia ==
=== 9 June ===
- On 9 June 2021, Japan's public health experts warned that the Tokyo Olympics could help the coronavirus to spread more rapidly. Epidemiologist Hiroshi Nishiura expressed concern that the games could help spread more contagious COVID-19 variants, given the fact that a large numbers of athletes, coaches, officials, media, local volunteers, and domestic spectators would participate in the games. Nishiura said the Japanese health authorities had not assessed the public health impact of holding the games. The majority of the experts were in favour of the cancellation of the Tokyo Games.

=== 11 June ===
- Malaysia has extended its total lockdown by another two weeks until 28 June since daily new cases are averaging over 5,000.

=== 15 June ===
- Malaysian Director-General of Health Noor Hisham Abdullah has announced that the Malaysian Government has given conditional approval for the public usage of the Cansino and Janssen vaccines. In addition, the Pfizer–BioNTech COVID-19 vaccine was also approved for used on persons 12 years and above.

=== 20 June ===
- Malaysian Director-General of Health Noor Hisham Abdullah has stated that the country is expected to achieve herd immunity status by November or December 2021 based on the progress of the country's vaccination programme.

=== 21 June ===
- The Malaysian coordinating minister for the National COVID-19 Immunisation Programme Khairy Jamaluddin confirmed that refugee communities in Malaysia would receive CanSino Biologics' Convidecia vaccine; with the first shipment due to arrive in late July 2021.
- Malaysian Health Minister Adham Baba and COVID-19 immunisation coordinating minister Khairy Jamaluddin confirmed that the Malaysian Institute of Medical Research (IMR) and Universiti Putra Malaysia had been working on a COVID-19 vaccine using mRNA technology since November 2020.

=== 24 June ===
- Japan's Emperor Naruhito, who was scheduled to declare the start of the Tokyo Olympics at the opening ceremony, expressed concern that the Tokyo Games could accelerate the spread of the coronavirus. According to the head of the Imperial Palace, while there were voices of anxiety among the public, Naruhito was nervous about the potential implications of the Games for public health.

=== 29 June ===
- China sells face masks for 1 cent each.

== Reactions and measures in the Western Pacific ==
=== 2 June ===
- Authorities in the Australian state of Victoria have extended the state's lockdown by another seven days. Some restrictions on travel, school attendance, and outdoors work have been eased. Use of the Service Victoria QR code check-in is required across Victoria for places like supermarkets and shops.

=== 6 June ===
- Guam starts offering vaccine tourism packages.

=== 8 June ===
- COVID-19 Response Minister Chris Hipkins has announced that New Zealand will receive 1 million doses of the Pfizer–BioNTech COVID-19 vaccine in July, bringing the total number to more than 1.9 million.

=== 13 June ===
- Cook Islands Prime Minister Mark Brown and Cook Islands Tourism chief executive Halatoa Fua have indicated that the Cook Islands government and tourism industry were exploring a travel bubble with Australia.

=== 18 June ===
- The New Zealand Iona Hoslted has warned that schools were being targeted by opponents of the national vaccination programme. The Ministry of Education also expressed concern that some principals were expressing opposition to vaccination and urged educators to use "appropriate sources" for verified information on COVID-19.

=== 22 June ===
- Abu Dhabi starts offering COVID vaccines to tourists.

=== 23 June ===
- New Zealand COVID-19 Response Minister Chris Hipkins and Director-General of Health Ashley Bloomfield announced that the Wellington region including the Wairarapa and the Kāpiti Coast would go into lockdown from 6pm until 11:59 pm on 27 June after a Sydney man travelled to the region while infected the SARS-CoV-2 Delta variant. Under Alert Level 2, social distancing and limits on social gatherings of 100 are enforced.

=== 26 June ===
- The New Zealand Government has paused quarantine-free travel with all Australian states and territories from 10:30 pm on 26 June until 11:59 pm on 29 June 2021 in response to multiple cases and outbreaks in Australia at varying levels.

=== 27 June ===
- The New Zealand Cabinet has extended Wellington's Alert Level 2 lockdown restrictions for 48 hours until 11:59 pm on 29 June.

=== 29 June ===
- The New Zealand Government has lifted Alert Level 2 restrictions on Wellington, with the capital moving to Alert level 1 at 11:59 pm. Bali starts offering vaccines to visitors.

=== 30 June ===
- The Fijian Government has announced an area of concern in Lautoka as a result of a birthday celebration.

== See also ==
- Timeline of the COVID-19 pandemic in June 2021
- Responses to the COVID-19 pandemic
