= Responses to the COVID-19 pandemic in September 2022 =

Aspect of viral disease pandemic

This article documents the chronology of the response to the COVID-19 pandemic in September 2022, which originated in Wuhan, China in December 2019. Some developments may become known or fully understood only in retrospect. Reporting on this pandemic began in December 2019.

== Reactions and measures in South, East and Southeast Asia ==
=== 1 September ===
- China - Stay at home orders, effective from 6pm announced in Chengdu in response to 157 locally acquired infections on that same day (51 were asymptomatic). All 21 million residents must be tested by the end of the weekend.

=== 3 September ===
- China - Shenzhen officials announce a weekend lockdown in response to 87 COVID-19 cases being reported on Friday, 2 September, 7 of those outside quarantine areas. During this time, bus and subway services will be suspended.

=== 4 September ===
- The Chinese National Medical Products Administration granted approval for the Convidecia Air, an inhaled version of the Convidecia vaccine, to be used as a booster dose.

=== 5 September ===
- China - In a response to a further 140 new COVID-19 infections, Chengdu authorities announced an extension to the current lockdown, with mass testing continuing until Wednesday whilst Shenzhen adopted a three-tier system of COVID-19 restrictions in response to a slight decrease in infections on Sunday.

== Reactions and measures in the Western Pacific ==
=== 12 September ===
- New Zealand Prime Minister Jacinda Ardern announced that the country's COVID-19 Protection Framework ("traffic light system") would end at 11:59pm that night. As a result, face masks will be eliminated for most public spaces and transportation with the exception of hospitals, clinics, pharmacies, and aged care facilities. In addition, household contacts of COVID-19 positive individuals will not be required to isolate unless they test positive for COVID-19. In addition, vaccine mandates for all travellers entering New Zealand and health workers will end on 13 September and 27 September respectively.
- New Zealand's national carrier Air New Zealand announced it would be dropping its facemask requirement from 11:59pm that night in response to the Government's decision to end the COVID-19 Protection Framework.

=== 13 September ===
- New Zealand's Ministry of Health has ended its daily COVID-19 reports in favour of releasing weekly reports every Monday, commencing 19 September.

=== 30 September ===
The Australian Government announces that mandatory isolation subsequent to a positive COVID-19 test, and pandemic leave payments, will end for all Australian residents, except for workers in high risk settings such as aged care and hospitals, commencing 14 October.

== See also ==
- Timeline of the COVID-19 pandemic in September 2022
- Responses to the COVID-19 pandemic
