= Ebola vaccine =

Vaccine against Ebola

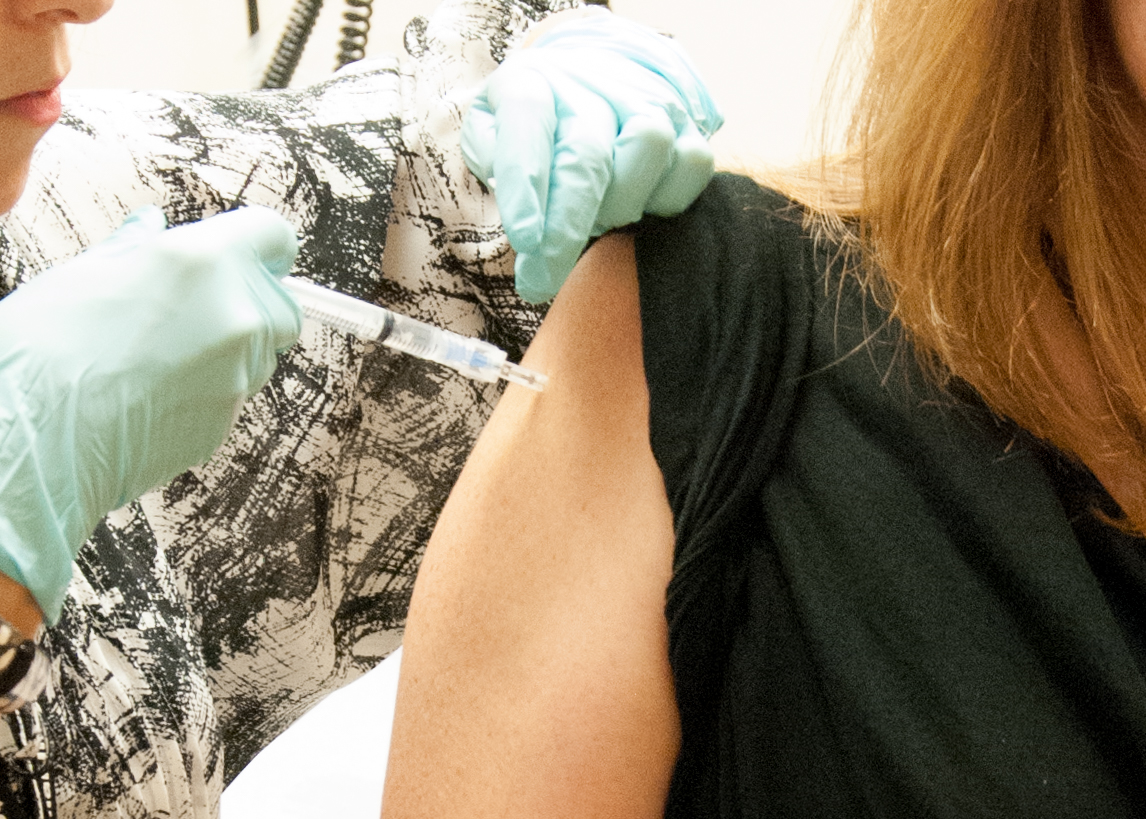
- Candidate Ebola vaccine being given

Vaccine description
- Target: Ebola virus
- Vaccine type: Viral vector

Clinical data
- Trade names: Ervebo
- AHFS/Drugs.com: Monograph
- License data: US DailyMed: Ebolavirus
- ATC code: J07BX02 (WHO)

Legal status
- Legal status: US: ℞-only; EU: Rx-only>

Identifiers
- CAS Number: 2581749-86-0
- DrugBank: DB15595

An Ebola vaccine is a vaccine used to prevent Ebola virus disease (Ebola). There are six known species of ebolavirus; four of them cause Ebola disease.

As of May 2026, there is one licensed vaccine against the Zaire ebolavirus species, and none against the other species. (Note: The Zabdeno/Mvabea vaccine was withdrawn in May 2026: WHO source is not up to date. (2026-06-10)) The rVSV-ZEBOV vaccine was first approved in the European Union in November 2019 and subsequently approved in the United States. It had been used extensively in the Kivu Ebola epidemic under a compassionate use protocol.

A second vaccine, Zabdeno/Mvabea, had been licensed by the European Union in July 2020, but was withdrawn by the manufacturer in May 2026.

Several vaccine candidates displayed efficacy to protect nonhuman primates (usually macaques) against lethal infection. Candidate vaccines include replication-deficient adenovirus vectors, replication-competent vesicular stomatitis (VSV) and human parainfluenza (HPIV-3) vectors, and virus-like nanoparticle preparations.The Ebola vaccine is on the World Health Organization's List of Essential Medicines.

== Chart ==
Vaccine	Associated organisations	Status	Strain used	Intra-Species efficacy	Efficacy against BDBV	Efficacy against SUDV	Efficacy against TAFV
rVSV ZEBOV (cAd3-ZEBOV) sold under Ervebo	Newlink Genetics, Merck, GSK, NIAID, Bavarian Nordic, PHAC & GlaxoSmithKline	In use	Kikwit	Yes 90-95%	Yes ~75%	Yes	No
Ad26.ZEBOV and MVA-BN-Filo, sold under Zabdeno/Mvabea	Johnson & Johnson, Bavarian Nordic, Jenner Institute	In use until 2026, when its authorization was withdrawn	Mayinga	Yes	Yes	No	No
Ad5-EBOV	CanSino Biologics & the Institute of Biotechnology of the Academy of Military Medical Sciences	Authorized in China after the completion of a Phase II Trial	Makona	Yes	No	No	No
GamEvac-Combi	Ministry of Health of the Russian Federation, Gamaleya Research Institute of Epidemiology and Microbiology, Ministry of Defence (Russia)	Authorized in Russia after the completion of a Phase II Trial	Makona	Yes 93%	No	No	No
EpivacEbola	Rospotrebnadzor	Authorized in Russia after the completion of a Phase III Trial	Makona	Question	Question	Question	Question
ChAd3	Sabin Vaccines Institute & NIAID	Phase II Trial completed	Mayinga	Question	Question	Question	Question
Vaxart Tablet	Vaxart Inc. & USAMRIID	Phase II Trial completed	Unknown	Question	Question	Question	Question
INO-4201 DNA vaccine	Inovio Pharmaceuticals	Phase I Trial completed	Unknown	Question	Question	Question	Question
ZEBOV GP	Novavax Inc.	Non-human primate challenges complete	Makona	Question	Question	Question	Question
AdCAGoptZGP Nasal Vaccine	Thomas Jefferson University, University of Texas-Austin & NIAID	Non-human primate challenge complete	Unknown	Question	Question	Question	Question
Attenuated Ebola virus vaccine:EBOVΔVP30	University of Tokyo, University of Wisconscin, Japan Science and Technology Agency	Non-human primate challenge complete	Mayinga	Question	Question	Question	Question
VSVΔG/EBOVGP	NIH & University of Texas Medical Branch	Non-human primate challenges complete	Unknown	Question	Question	Question	Question
VP35m	University of California, Irvine, University of Texas Medical Branch, Mayo Clinic &Georgia State University	Non-human primate challenge complete	Unknown	Question	Question	Question	Question

== Approved worldwide ==
=== rVSV-ZEBOV ===
rVSV-ZEBOV (also known as cAd3-ZEBO) sold under the brand name Ervebo, is a vaccine based on the vesicular stomatitis virus which was genetically modified to express a surface glycoprotein of the Kikwit strain of the Zaire Ebola virus. Nonetheless, due to high levels of similarity between the different strains of the Zaire virus, it remains effective even when faced with other strains of the Zaire virus such as the Mayinga or Makona strain. However, increased genetic differences means it offers only partial protection against other species of ebolaviruses such as the Sudan virus or the Bundibugyo virus, where it offers about a 75% level of protection.

In November 2019, the European Commission granted a conditional marketing authorisation. The World Health Organization (WHO) prequalification came less than 48 hours later, making it the fastest vaccine prequalification process ever conducted by the WHO. It was approved for medical use in the European Union in November 2019. It was approved for medical use in the United States in December 2019.

The most common side effects include pain, swelling and redness at the injection site, headache, fever, muscle pain, tiredness and joint pain. In general, these reactions occur within seven days after vaccination, are mild to moderate in intensity and resolved in less than a week.

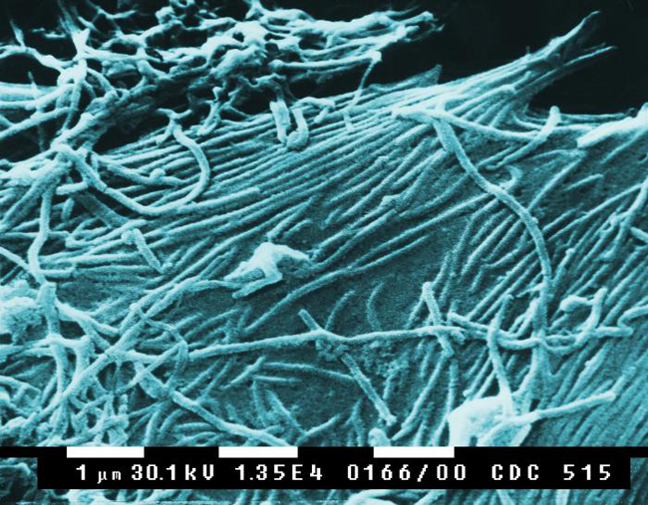
Ebola virions

It was developed by the Public Health Agency of Canada, with development subsequently taken over by Merck Inc. In September 2014, two Phase I clinical trials began for the vaccine cAd3-EBO Z, which is based on an attenuated version of a chimpanzee adenovirus (cAd3) that has been genetically altered so that it is unable to replicate in humans. The cAd3 vector has a DNA fragment insert that encodes the Zaire ebolavirus glycoprotein, which is expressed on the virion surface and is critical for attachment to host cells and catalysis of membrane fusion. It was developed by NIAID in collaboration with Okairos, now a division of GlaxoSmithKline. For the trial designated VRC 20, 20 volunteers were recruited by the NIAID in Bethesda, Maryland, while three dose-specific groups of 20 volunteers each were recruited for trial EBL01 by University of Oxford, UK. Initial results were released in November 2014; all 20 volunteers developed antibodies against Ebola and there were no significant concerns raised about safety.

In October 2014, the Wellcome Trust, who was also one of the biggest UK founders, also announced the start of multiple trials in healthy volunteers in Europe, Gabon, Kenya, and the US. The vaccine was proven safe at multiple sites in North America, Europe, and Africa, but several volunteers at one trial site in Geneva, Switzerland, developed vaccine-related arthritis after about two weeks, and about 20–30% of volunteers at reporting sites developed low-grade post-vaccine fever, which resolved within a day or two. Other common side-effects were pain at the site of injection, myalgia, and fatigue. The trial was temporarily halted in December 2014 due to possible adverse effects, but subsequently resumed.

In December 2014, University of Oxford expanded the trial to include a booster vaccine based on MVA-BN, a strain of Modified vaccinia Ankara, developed by Bavarian Nordic, to investigate whether it can help increase immune responses further. The trial which has enrolled a total of 60 volunteers will see 30 volunteers vaccinated with the booster vaccine. As of April 2015, Phase III trial with a single dose of cAd3-EBO Z began in Sierra Leone and Liberia after a successful Phase 2 study in West Africa countries. On 31 July 2015, preliminary results of a phase III trial in Guinea indicated that the vaccine appeared to be "highly efficacious and safe." The trial used a ring vaccination protocol that first vaccinated all the closest contacts of new cases of Ebola infection either immediately or after 21 days. Because of the demonstrated efficacy of immediate vaccination, all recipients will now be immunized immediately. Ring vaccination is the method used in the program to eradicate smallpox in the 1970s. The trial will continue to assess whether the vaccine is effective in creating herd immunity to Ebola virus infection. In December 2016, a study found the VSV-EBOV vaccine to be 95–100% effective against the Zaire ebolavirus, making it the first proven vaccine against the disease.

The approval was supported by a study conducted in Guinea during the 2014–2016 outbreak in individuals 18 years of age and older. The study was a randomized cluster (ring) vaccination study in which 3,537 contacts, and contacts of contacts, of individuals with laboratory-confirmed Ebola virus disease (EVD) received either "immediate" or 21-day "delayed" vaccination. This design was intended to capture a social network of individuals and locations that might include dwellings or workplaces where a patient spent time while symptomatic, or the households of individuals who had contact with the patient during that person's illness or death. In a comparison of cases of EVD among 2,108 individuals in the "immediate" vaccination arm and 1,429 individuals in the "delayed" vaccination arm, Ervebo was determined to be 100% effective in preventing Ebola cases with symptom onset greater than ten days after vaccination. No cases of EVD with symptom onset greater than ten days after vaccination were observed in the "immediate" cluster group, compared with ten cases of EVD in the 21-day "delayed" cluster group.

In additional studies, antibody responses were assessed in 477 individuals in Liberia, some 500 individuals in Sierra Leone, and about 900 individuals in Canada, Spain, and the US. The antibody responses among those in the study conducted in Canada, Spain and the US were similar to those among individuals in the studies conducted in Liberia and Sierra Leone.

The safety was assessed in approximately 15,000 individuals in Africa, Europe, and North America. The most commonly reported side effects were pain, swelling and redness at the injection site, as well as headache, fever, joint and muscle aches and fatigue.

In December 2016, a study found the VSV-EBOV vaccine to be 70–100% effective against the Ebola virus, making it the first proven vaccine against the disease. However, the design of this study and the high efficacy of the vaccine were questioned. In November 2019, the European Commission granted a conditional marketing authorization to Ervebo (rVSV∆G-ZEBOV-GP, live) and the WHO prequalified an Ebola vaccine for the first time.

In July 2023, the FDA expanded the indication for Ervebo to cover people aged twelve years of age and older. The vaccine has also been proven to be safe for immunocompromised individuals, such as those with HIV, by a 2017 study in Liberia.

Ervebo demonstrated significant effectiveness during the 2018-2020 outbreak in the Democratic Republic of the Congo, providing 84% protection to individuals vaccinated at least 10 days prior to exposure. This finding, detailed in a study published in The Lancet Infectious Diseases, marks the first peer-reviewed evaluation of the vaccine, Ervebo, under real-world conditions.

== Approved locally or temporarily ==
=== Zabdeno/mvabea ===
The two-dose regimen of Ad26.ZEBOV and MVA-BN-Filo, sold under the brand names Zabdeno and Mvabea, was developed by Johnson & Johnson at its Janssen Pharmaceutical company. It received a 5 year approval for medical use against the Zaire ebolavirus in the European Union in July 2020.

The regimen consists of two vaccine components (first vaccine as prime, followed by a second vaccine as boost) – the first based on AdVac technology from Crucell Holland B.V. (which is part of Janssen), the second based on the MVA-BN technology from Bavarian Nordic. The Ad26.ZEBOV is derived from human adenovirus serotype 26 (Ad26) expressing the Ebola virus Mayinga variant glycoprotein, while the second component MVA-BN is the Modified Vaccinia Virus Ankara – Bavarian Nordic (MVA-BN) Filo-vector. This product commenced phase I clinical trial at the Jenner Institute in Oxford during January 2015. The preliminary data indicated the prime-boost vaccine regimen elicited temporary immunologic response in the volunteers as expected from vaccination. The phase II trial enrolled 612 adult volunteers and commenced in July 2015, in the United Kingdom and France. A second phase II trial, involving 1,200 volunteers, was initiated in Africa with the first trial commenced in Sierra Leone in October 2015.

In September 2019, the Committee for Medicinal Products for Human Use (CHMP) of the European Medicines Agency (EMA) granted an accelerated assessment to Janssen for Ad26.ZEBOV and MVA-BN-Filo, and in November 2019, Janssen submitted a marketing authorisation application (MAA) to the EMA for approval of Ad26.ZEBOV and MVA-BN-Filo.

In May 2020, the EMA CHMP recommended granting a marketing authorization for the combination of Ad26.ZEBOV (Zabdeno) and MVA-BN-Filo (Mvabea) vaccines. Zabdeno is given first and Mvabea is administered approximately eight weeks later as a booster. This prophylactic two-dose regimen is therefore not suitable for an outbreak response where immediate protection is necessary. As a precautionary measure for individuals at imminent risk of exposure to Ebola virus (for example healthcare professionals and those living in or visiting areas with an ongoing Ebola virus disease outbreak), an extra Zabdeno booster vaccination should be considered for individuals who completed the Zabdeno-Mvabea two-dose vaccination regimen more than four months ago. Efficacy for humans is not yet known as the efficacy has been extrapolated from animal studies.

The European Commission extended indefinitely its authorization in 2025, before withdrawing it in May 2026.

=== Ad5-ebov ===
In 2014 and 2015, a double-blind, randomized Phase I trial was conducted in the Jiangsu Province of China; the trial examined a vaccine that contains glycoproteins of the 2014 strain, rather than those of the 1976 strain. The trial found signals of efficacy and raised no significant safety concerns.

In 2017, the China Food and Drug Administration (CFDA) announced approval of a vaccine against the Zaire ebolavirus, co-developed by the Institute of Biotechnology of the Academy of Military Medical Sciences and the private vaccine-maker CanSino Biologics. It contains a human adenovirus serotype 5 vector (Ad5) with the glycoprotein gene from ZEBOV. Their findings were consistent with previous tests on rVSV-ZEBOV in Africa and Europe.

=== GamEvac-Combi ===
A study published in Human Vaccines & Immunotherapeutics in March 2017, analyzing data from a clinical trial of the GamEvac-Combi vaccine in Russia, concluded said vaccine, which is intended to be used against the Zaire ebolavirus, to be safe and effective and recommended proceeding to Phase III trials.

== Human trials ==
=== Vaxart tablet ===
Vaxart Inc. is developing a vaccine technology in the form of a temperature-stable tablet which may offer advantages such as reduced cold chain requirement, and rapid and scalable manufacturing. In January 2015, Vaxart announced that it had secured funding to develop its Ebola vaccine to Phase I trial.

== Animal trials ==
=== Ebola GP vaccine ===
Recombinant formation plasmids

At the 8th Vaccine and ISV Conference in Philadelphia on 27−28 October 2014, Novavax Inc. reported the development in a "few weeks" of a glycoprotein (GP) nanoparticle Zaire ebolavirus (ZEBOV GP) vaccine using their proprietary recombinant technology. A recombinant protein is a protein whose code is carried by recombinant DNA. The vaccine is based on the newly published genetic sequence of the 2014 Guinea Ebola (Makona) strain that is responsible for the 2014 Ebola disease epidemic in West Africa. In animal studies, a useful immune response was induced and was found to be enhanced ten to a hundred-fold by the company's "Matrix-M" immunologic adjuvant. A study of the response of non-human primates to the vaccine had been initiated. As of February 2015, Novavax had completed two primate studies on baboons and macaques and had initiated a Phase I clinical trial in Australia. The Lipid nanoparticle (LNP)-encapsulated siRNAs rapidly adapted to target the Makona outbreak strain of EBOV and are able to protect 100% of rhesus monkeys against lethal challenge when treatment was initiated at three days post-exposure while animals were viremic and clinically ill.

=== Nasal vaccine ===
On 5 November 2014, the Houston Chronicle reported that a research team at the University of Texas-Austin was developing a nasal spray Ebola vaccine, which the team had been working on for seven years. The team reported in 2014, that in the nonhuman primate studies it conducted, the vaccine had more efficacy when delivered via nasal spray than by injection. As of November 2014, further development by the team appeared unlikely due to lack of funding.

=== Attenuated ebola virus vaccine: EBOVΔVP30 ===
A study published in Science during March 2015, demonstrated that vaccination with a weakened form of the Ebola virus provides some measure of protection to non-human primates. This study was conducted in accordance with a protocol approved by an Institutional Animal Care and Use Committee of the National Institutes of Health. The new vaccine relies on a strain of Ebola called EBOVΔVP30, which is unable to replicate.

=== Vp35m ===
In September 2019, a study published in Cell Reports demonstrated the role of the Ebola virus VP35 protein in its immune evasion. A recombinant form of Ebola virus with a mutant VP35 protein (VP35m) was developed, and showed positive results in the activation of the RIG-I-like receptor signaling. Non-human primates were challenged with different doses of VP35. This challenge resulted in the activation of the innate immune system and the production of anti-EBOV antibodies. The primates were then back-challenged with the wild type Ebola virus and survived. This potentially creates a prospect for a future vaccine development.

== Clinical trials in West Africa ==
In January 2015, the World Health Organization (WHO) announced that the vaccines cAd3-EBO Z and VSV-EBOV had demonstrated acceptable safety profiles during early testing and would soon progress to large-scale trials in Liberia, Sierra Leone, and Guinea. The trials would involve up to 27,000 people and comprise three groups – members of the first two groups would receive the two candidate vaccines, while the third group will receive a placebo. Both vaccines have since successfully completed the Phase 2 studies. The large scale Phase 3 studies have begun as of April 2015, in Liberia and Sierra Leone, and in Guinea in March 2016.

In addition, a medical anthropologist at Université de Montréal, had been working in Guinea and raised further questions about safety in the ring trial after spending time in April at one of the Ebola treatment units where trial participants are taken if they become ill, the centre in Coyah, about 50 km from the capital of Conakry.

The Russian Foreign Ministry announced in 2016, the intention to conduct field trials of two Russian vaccines involving 2000 people. According to local media reports, the Guinean government authorized the commencement of the trials on 9 August 2017, at the Rusal-built Research and Diagnostic Center of Epidemiology and Microbiology in Kindia. The trials were slated to continue until 2018. As of October 2019, Russia licensed the vaccine by local regulatory authorities and was reportedly ready to ship vaccine to Africa.

== US national stockpile ==
In 2014, Credit Suisse estimated that the US government will provide over $1 billion in contracts to companies to develop medicine and vaccines for Ebola virus disease. Congress passed a law in 2004 that funds a national stockpile of vaccines and medicine for possible outbreaks of disease. A number of companies were expected to develop Ebola vaccines: GlaxoSmithKline, NewLink Genetics, Johnson & Johnson, and Bavarian Nordic. Another company, Emergent BioSolutions, was a contestant for manufacturing new doses of ZMapp, a drug for Ebola virus disease treatment originally developed by Mapp Biopharmaceutical. Supplies of ZMapp ran out in August 2014. In September 2014, the Biomedical Advanced Research and Development Authority (BARDA) entered into a multimillion-dollar contract with Mapp Biopharmaceutical to accelerate the development of ZMapp. Additional contracts were signed in 2017.
