= Pei Hsien Tang =

Chinese hematologist

Tang Peixian or Pei Hsien Tang (Chinese: 唐佩弦; October 1930 – 11 April 2013) was a Chinese hematologist.

Tang was born in Shanghai, and attended the Peking Union Medical College. He worked for the Institute of Basic Medical Sciences and the Academy of Military Medical Sciences. Over the course of his career, Tang assumed leadership roles in the Chinese Society of Pathophyisiology and the Chinese Pathophysiology Society of Experimental Hematology. Tang was the founding editor of the Journal of Experimental Hematology, established in 1993, and served until his death. He also served on the Sixth National People's Congress.
