= AD 5 =

AD 5 may refer to:

- The year AD 5; see the decade 0s
- Adenovirus serotype 5; see Adenoviridae

== See also ==
- AD-5 (disambiguation)
- KIIS 102.3, a radion station in Adelaide, South Australia, known as 5AD
