= Chen Wei (medical scientist) =

Chinese epidemiologist

- 陈薇
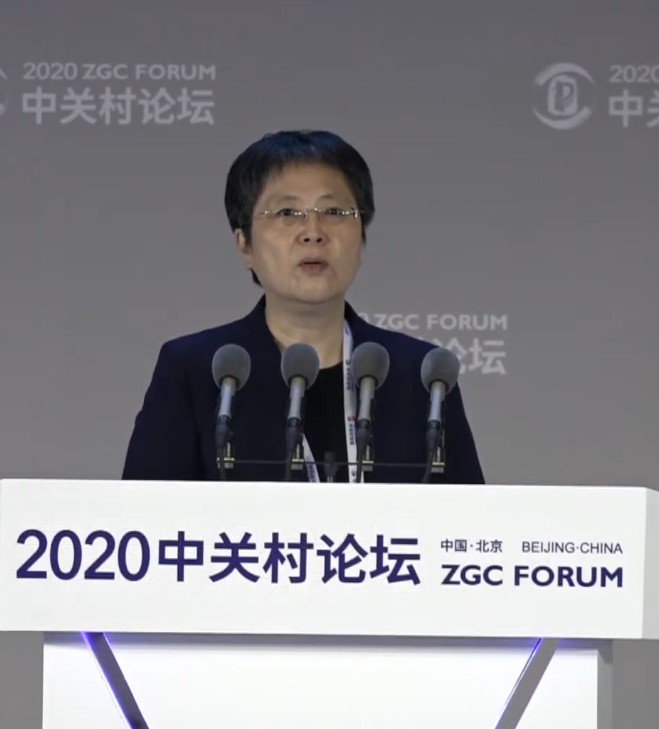

Member of the Chinese People's Political Consultative Conference National Committee (13th)
- Incumbent
- Assumed office March 2018
- Chairman: Wang Yang

Delegate to the National People's Congress (12th)
- In office March 2013 – March 2018
- Chairman: Zhang Dejiang
- Constituency: People's Liberation Army

Personal details
- Born: February 1966 (age 60) Lanxi, Zhejiang China
- Party: Chinese Communist Party
- Education: Zhejiang University; Tsinghua University; Academy of Military Medical Sciences

Military service
- Allegiance: People's Republic of China
- Branch/service: People's Liberation Army
- Years of service: 1991–present
- Rank: Shao jiang (Major general)
- Scientific career
- Fields: Research on ebola, SARS-CoV and SARS-CoV-2
- Board member of: All-China Women's Federation

Chinese name
- Traditional Chinese: 陳薇
- Simplified Chinese: 陈薇
Transcriptions
Standard Mandarin
- Hanyu Pinyin: Chén Wēi

Chen Wei (Chinese: 陈薇; born February 1966) is a Chinese epidemiologist and virologist specializing in biodefense, and is currently working as a researcher and doctoral advisor at the Academy of Military Medical Sciences, and is an Academician of the Chinese Academy of Engineering (CAE). Chen became a major general in 2015.

== Biography ==
Chen was born in Lanxi County, Jinhua, Zhejiang, in 1966. She received her bachelor's degree in chemical engineering from the Zhejiang University in 1988. She obtained a master's degree at Tsinghua University in 1991. She attended the Academy of Military Medical Sciences where she obtained her doctor's degree in 1998. She became a faculty member of the academy upon graduation.

In 2013, Chen became a delegate of the People's Liberation Army to the National People's Congress.

On 10 July 2015, she was awarded the military rank of major general (shaojiang) by Central Military Commission chairman Xi Jinping.

She was a delegate to the 12th National People's Congress. In January 2018, she became a member of the 13th National Committee of the Chinese People's Political Consultative Conference. In November 2019, She was elected as an academician of the Chinese Academy of Engineering.

On 30 May 2021, she was elected vice president of the China Association for Science and Technology.

== COVID-19 vaccine research ==
In 2020, Chen led a joint team of the Institute of Biotechnology, the Academy of Military Medical Sciences, and CanSino Biologics to develop Convidecia. The development team registered a Phase 1 trial in March 2020 and a Phase 2 trial in April 2020. It conducted its Phase III trials in Argentina, Chile, Mexico, Pakistan, Russia, and Saudi Arabia with 40,000 participants.

In February 2021, global data from Phase III trials and 101 COVID cases showed the vaccine had a 65.7% efficacy in preventing moderate symptoms of COVID-19, and 91% efficacy in preventing severe disease.

Convidecia is approved for use by some countries in Asia, Europe, and Latin America.

== Personal life ==
Chen is married to her husband who is a native of Shandong province and they have a son.

== Honours and awards ==
- 2009 Qiushi Outstanding Youth Award
- 2010 National Science Fund for Distinguished Young Scholars
- 2011 The 8th Chinese Young Women in Science Awards
- 2017 Science and Technology Progress Award of the Ho Leung Ho Lee Foundation
- 2020 China's national honorary title "the People's Hero"

== See also ==
- Shi Zhengli
- Qiu Xiangguo
