= AD-5 =

AD-5 or variation, may refer to:

- AD 5, the 5th year of the Common Era
- USS Prairie (AD-5), an auxiliary cruiser of the U.S. Navy
- Douglas AD-5 Skyraider, fighter-bomber airplane
- AD5 experiment "ALPHA" at the CERN Antiproton Decelerator ring, an antimatter physics experiment
- Ad5, adenovirus serotype 5, a virus commonly used as a recombinant virus therapy vector (rAd5)
- Alzheimer's disease, stage 5
- Alzheimer's Disease 5, a familial variant of Alzheimer's; see List of OMIM disorder codes

== See also ==
- 5AD (radio station), Adelaide, South Australia, Australia
- Ad5-nCoV, COVID-19 vaccine
- Ad5-EBOV, Ebola vaccine
- 5 (disambiguation)
- AD (disambiguation)
