= Wu Dechang =

Chinese toxicologist (1927–2018)

Wu Dechang (Chinese: 吴德昌; 22 October 1927 – 10 May 2018) was a Chinese physician and toxicologist. He established China's first laboratory for radiation toxicology, and is considered a founder of radiation toxicology and radiation protection studies in the country. He was a professor and president of the Academy of Military Medical Sciences, and served as president of the China Toxicology Society, deputy representative of China to the United Nations Scientific Committee on the Effects of Atomic Radiation, and as a committee member of the International Commission on Radiological Protection. He was elected an academician of the Chinese Academy of Engineering in 1995.

== Life and career ==
Wu was born in Beijing, Republic of China on 22 October 1927, with his ancestral home in Wujin, Jiangsu. After graduating from Peking University in 1949 with a degree in chemistry, he taught as an assistant professor and later lecturer at Peking Union Medical College.

In 1956, Wu was selected by the Ministry of Health to study in the Soviet Union for a year. After returning to China, he taught at the Academy of Military Medical Sciences (AMMS) as an associate professor. He was later promoted to professor, Chair of the Department of Toxicology, Dean of the AMMS Institute of Radiation Medicine, and eventually President of AMMS.

Outside of the AMMS, Wu served as President of the China Toxicology Society, China's deputy representative to the United Nations Scientific Committee on the Effects of Atomic Radiation (UNSCEAR), and as a member of Committee 1 (Radiation Effects) of the International Commission on Radiological Protection (ICRP).

On 10 May 2018, Wu died at the People's Liberation Army General Hospital in Beijing, at the age of 90.

== Contributions ==
Wu established China's first laboratory for radiation toxicology. He demonstrated the contamination patterns and hazards of nuclear fallouts and proposed corresponding measures of protection. In the 1970s, he studied the toxicology of plutonium and discovered the mechanism of carcinogenesis in the lung cells and the lymph nodes.

In 1976, a failed Chinese nuclear test caused large-scale plutonium contamination at the test site. Wu, who was in charge of training medical personnel to prepare for a potential fallout, managed the emergency response after the accident to protect the health of the workers. In the 1980s, he oversaw a systematic study of the emergency medical response to the accident, which won the Special Prize of the State Science and Technology Progress Award. He was later involved in designing radiation protection measures at the Qinshan and Daya Bay nuclear power plants.

From the 1990s, Wu studied the molecular mechanism of carcinogenesis by alpha particle radiation. He published more than 210 scientific papers and 7 books.

== Honours and recognition ==
Wu was conferred the State Science and Technology Progress Award three times (Special Prize in 1985, and Second Prizes in 1993 and 1995), the Ho Leung Ho Lee Prize in Medical Sciences (2003), and many military or ministerial awards. He was elected an academician of the Chinese Academy of Engineering in 1995.
