= Academy of Military Medical Sciences =

Medical research institution in Beijing, China

Coordinates: 39.8993°N 116.263°E

- Simplified Chinese: 中国人民解放军军事科学院军事医学研究院
- Traditional Chinese: 中國人民解放軍軍事科學院軍事醫學研究院
Transcriptions
Standard Mandarin
- Hanyu Pinyin: Zhōngguó Rénmín Jiěfàngjūn Jūnshì Kēxuéyuàn Jūnshì Yīxué Yánjiūyuàn

The Academy of Military Medical Sciences (中国人民解放军军事科学院军事医学研究院) is a medical research institution affiliated with the People's Liberation Army. Headquartered in Haidian, Beijing, it is organizationally placed under the People's Liberation Army Academy of Military Sciences. It was established in Shanghai in 1951 and relocated to Beijing in 1958.

== In media ==
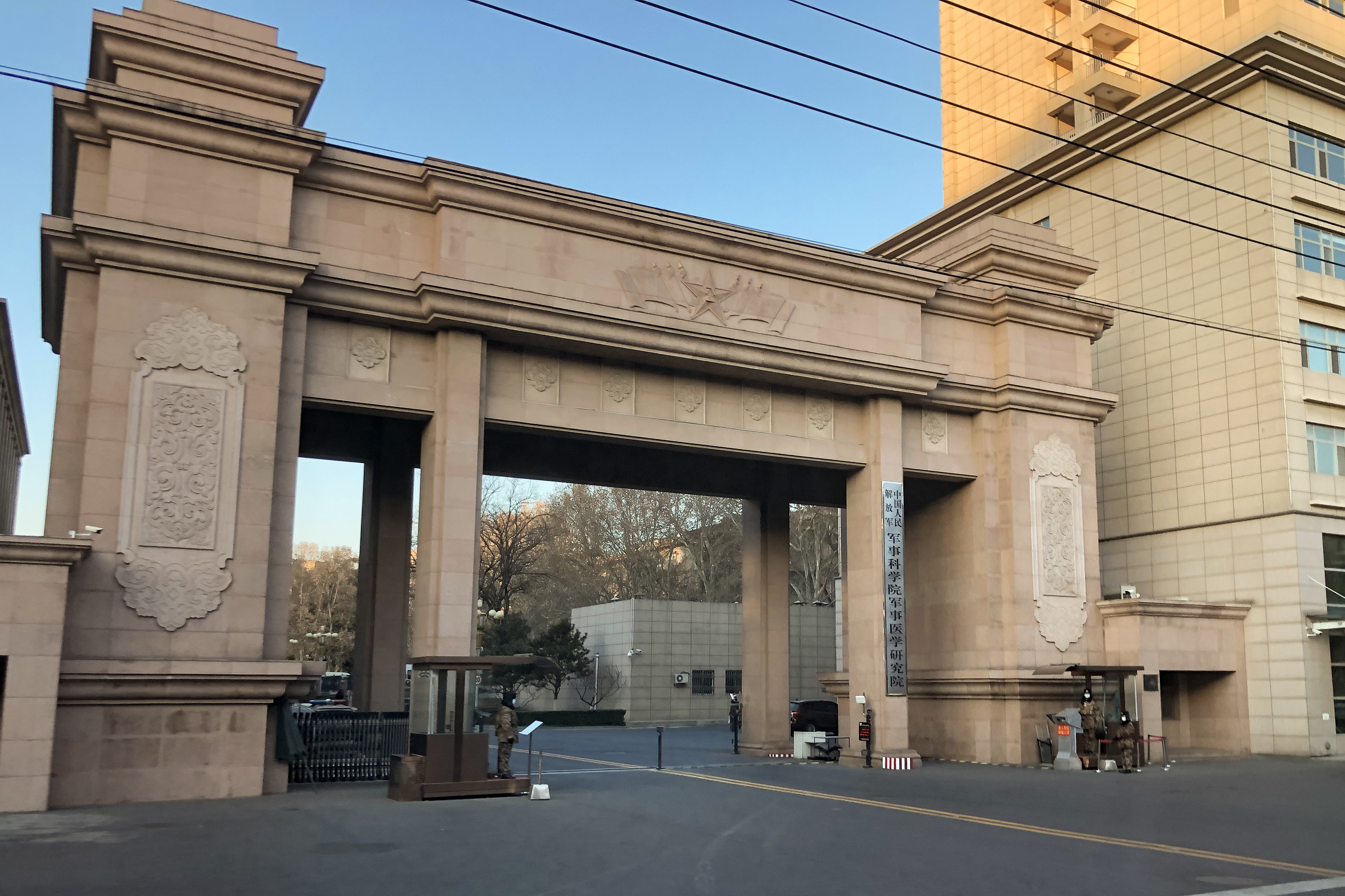
The AMMS in Beijing

In October 2011, the drug "Night Eagle", developed to help soldiers cope with sleep deprivation during missions, was unveiled in an exhibition marking the institute's 60th anniversary.

In December 2014, the Chinese government announced that the Academy of Military Medical Sciences had developed an Ebola virus vaccine candidate that had been approved for clinical trials.

In December 2021, the United States Department of Commerce added the Academy of Military Medical Sciences to its Entity List, accusing it of aiding in the persecution of Uyghurs in China.

=== COVID-19 vaccine ===
During the COVID-19 pandemic, the Academy of Military Medical Sciences partnered with CanSino Biologics to develop Convidecia. The development team, led by Chen Wei, registered a Phase 1 trial in March 2020 and a Phase 2 trial in April 2020. It conducted its Phase III trials in Argentina, Chile, Mexico, Pakistan, Russia, and Saudi Arabia with 40,000 participants.

In February 2021, global data from Phase III trials and 101 COVID cases showed the vaccine had a 65.7% efficacy in preventing moderate symptoms of COVID-19, and 91% efficacy in preventing severe disease. It has similar efficacy to the Janssen vaccine, another one-shot adenovirus vector vaccine with 66% efficacy in a global trial. Convidecia is also similar to other viral vector vaccines like the Oxford–AstraZeneca vaccine and Sputnik V vaccine. Its single-dose regimen and standard refrigerator storage requirement (2°to 8 °C) could make it a favorable vaccine option for many countries.

Convidecia is approved for use by some countries in Asia, Europe, and Latin America. Production capacity for Ad5-NCov should reach 500 million doses in 2021. Manufacturing will take place in China, Malaysia, Mexico, and Pakistan.

The vaccine was the first one approved outside of clinical trials in an expedited decision, which authorized its use only by the Chinese military.

== See also ==
- Wu Dechang, radiation toxicologist and former President of AMMS
- JK-05
