= CAd3-ZEBOV =

Experimental vaccine for ebolaviruses

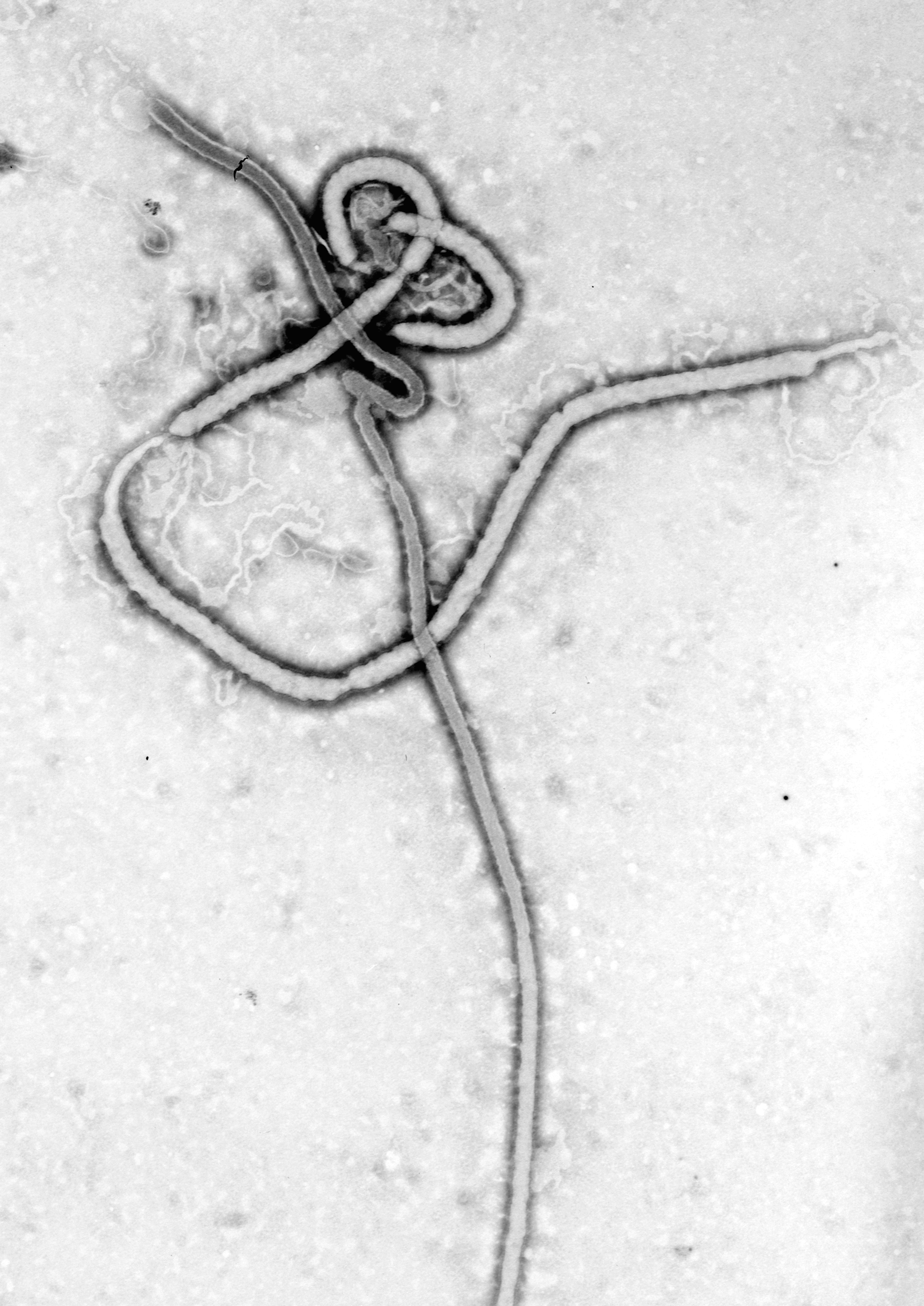

Vaccine description
- Target: Ebola virus
- Vaccine type: Recombinant vector

Identifiers
- ChemSpider: none

cAd3-ZEBOV (also known as the NIAID/GSK Ebola vaccine or cAd3-EBO Z) was an experimental vaccine for two ebolaviruses, Zaire virus and Sudan virus, developed by scientists at GlaxoSmithKline (GSK) and tested by National Institute of Allergy and Infectious Disease (NIAID). This vaccine is derived from a chimpanzee adenovirus, Chimp Adenovirus type 3 (ChAd3), genetically engineered to express glycoproteins from the Zaire and Sudan species of ebolavirus to provoke an immune response against them. Simultaneous phase 1 trials of this vaccine commenced in September 2014, being administered to volunteers in Oxford and Bethesda. During October the vaccine is being administered to a further group of volunteers in Mali. If this phase is completed successfully, the vaccine will be fast tracked for use in the Ebola virus epidemic in West Africa. In preparation for this, GSK is preparing a stockpile of 10,000 doses.

== First British trial ==
Following ten Americans who received the vaccine in a trial, Ruth Atkins (born 1966) of Oxfordshire, a former nurse with the British National Health Service, was the first British volunteer to receive the experimental vaccine (on September 17, 2014) in a vaccine trial run by Oxford University researchers and funded by the Wellcome Trust and the UK government. This variant was only designed to protect against Ebola virus and not Sudan virus.

== See also ==
- VSV-EBOV
- ZMapp
