= CanSino Biologics =

Chinese vaccine company

Coordinates: 39.0739°N 117.5430°E

CanSino Biologics Inc.
- Trade name: CanSinoBIO
- Native name: 康希诺生物
- Traded as: SEHK: 6185
- Founded: 2009; 17 years ago in Tianjin, China
- Founders: Yu Xuefeng; Zhu Tao; Qiu Dongxu; Helen Mao Huihua
- Headquarters: 185 South Avenue, TEDA West District, Tianjin, China
- Website: cansinotech.com (in English); cansinotech.com.cn (in Chinese)

CanSino Biologics (simplified Chinese: 康希诺生物; traditional Chinese: 康希諾生物; pinyin: Kāngxīnuò Shēngwù), often abbreviated as CanSinoBIO, is a Chinese vaccine company.

== History ==
CanSino Biologics was founded in 2009 in Tianjin by Yu Xuefeng, Zhu Tao, Qiu Dongxu and Helen Mao Huihua.

In July 2018, it filed an application to list on the Hong Kong Stock Exchange. It debuted on 28 March 2019 with an increase of 59%, the highest first day trading gain in Hong Kong since 2017. In August 2020, it completed a secondary offering on Shanghai Stock Exchange's STAR market where it raised 5.2 billion yuan (US$750 million).

== Vaccines ==
The company has a portfolio of vaccines under research including Ad5-EBOV to prevent Ebola and Ad5-nCoV for COVID-19. The company has previously collaborated with the National Research Council of Canada (NRC) on vaccine development. The two organizations began collaborating in 2013, and they later worked together to develop an Ebola vaccine.

=== COVID-19 vaccine development ===
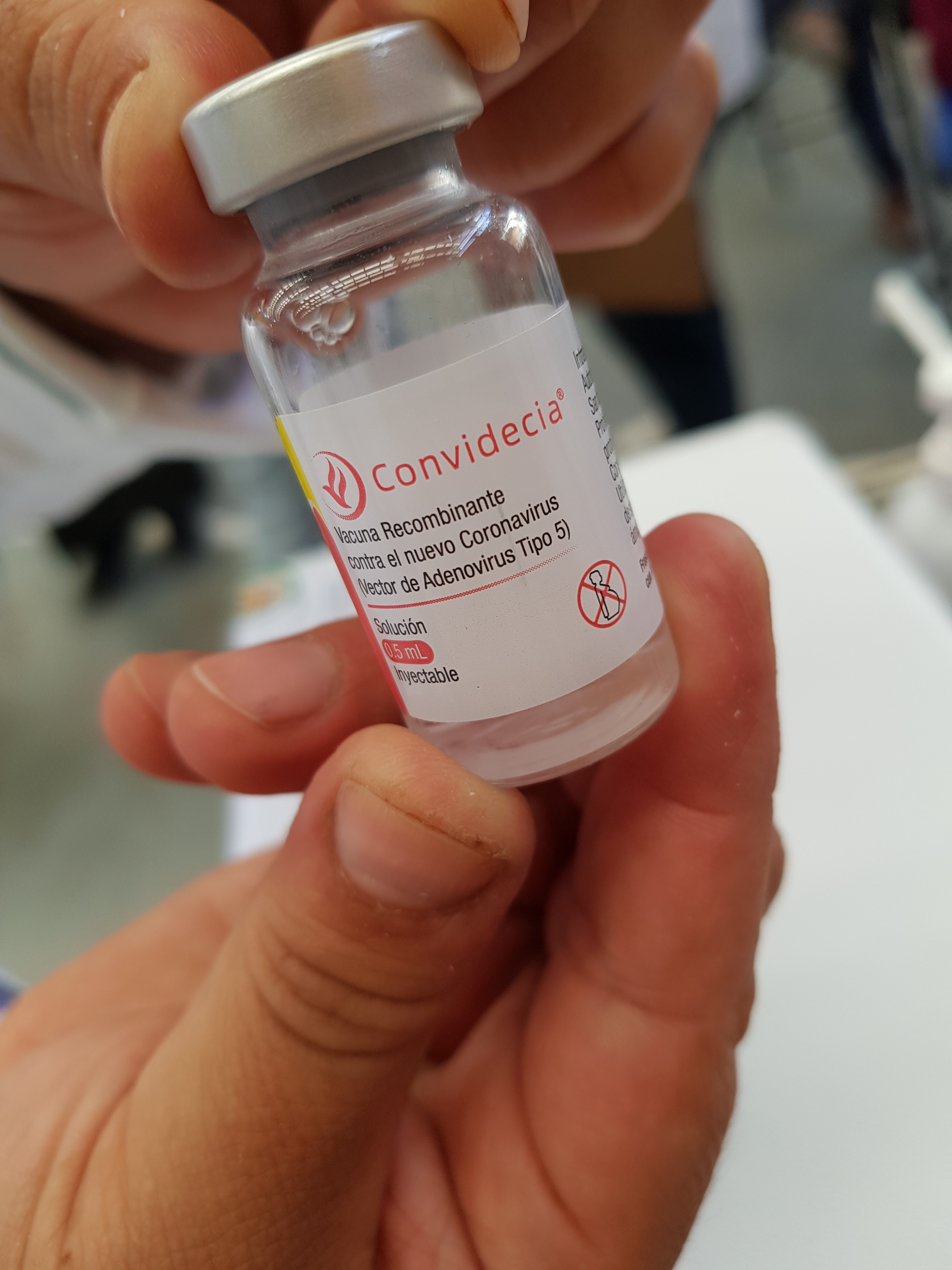
A multi-dose vial of CanSino's Convidecia vaccine for COVID-19 (AD5-nCOV) filled and finished in Mexico.

AD5-nCOV, trade-named Convidecia, is a single-dose viral vector COVID-19 vaccine developed by CanSino. Since late 2020, it has been in Phase III trials in Chile, Mexico, Pakistan, Russia, and Saudi Arabia with 40,000 participants.

In February 2021, global data from Phase III trials and 101 COVID cases showed that the vaccine had a 65.7% efficacy in preventing moderate symptoms of COVID-19, and 91% efficacy in preventing severe disease. It has similar efficacy to the Janssen vaccine, another one-shot adenovirus vector vaccine with 66% efficacy in a global trial. Its single-dose regimen and normal refrigerator storage requirement make it a favorable vaccine option for many countries. The vaccine is approved for emergency use listing by the WHO.

In April 2021, CanSino Biologics began clinical trials for a version of its COVID-19 vaccine administered by inhalation rather than injection. Rollout of inhaled boosters began in China in October 2022.

Convidecia is approved for use by some countries in Asia, Latin America, and by Hungary. Production capacity for Ad5-NCov should reach 500 million doses in 2021. Manufacturing will take place in China, Malaysia, Mexico, and Pakistan.

== Investors ==
As of 2018, CanSino Biologics investors included Lilly Asia Ventures, Qiming Venture Partners and SDIC Fund Management.

== See also ==
- Sinovac
- Sinopharm
