= Convidecia =

Vaccine against COVID-19

AD5-nCOV
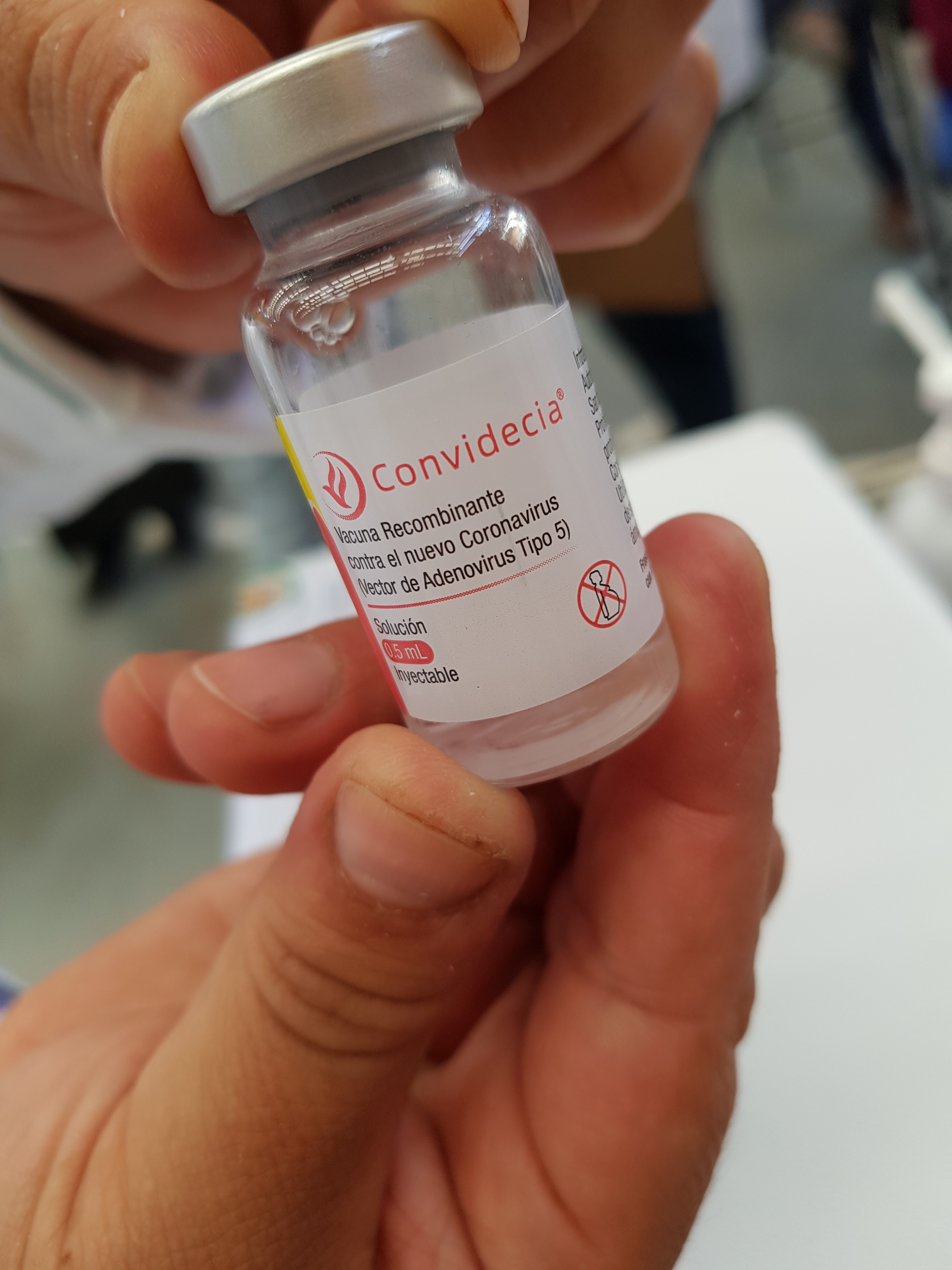
- A multi-dose vial of Convidecia (AD5-nCOV) filled and finished in Mexico

Vaccine description
- Target: SARS-CoV-2
- Vaccine type: Viral vector

Clinical data
- Trade names: Convidecia
- Other names: PakVac
- Routes of administration: Intramuscular, Nebulizer
- ATC code: J07BN02 (WHO)

Legal status
- Legal status: Full list of Convidecia authorizations

Identifiers
- CAS Number: 2540656-88-8
- DrugBank: DB15655
- UNII: 5AHC3V2UQS

AD5-nCOV, trade-named Convidecia, is a single-dose viral vector vaccine for COVID-19 that is also used as an inhaled booster. It was developed by CanSino Biologics, with Phase III trials conducted in Argentina, Chile, Mexico, Pakistan, Russia, and Saudi Arabia with 40,000 participants.

In February 2021, global data from Phase III trials and 101 COVID cases showed that the intramuscular version of the vaccine had a 65.7% efficacy in preventing moderate symptoms of COVID-19, and 91% efficacy in preventing severe disease. It has similar efficacy to the Janssen vaccine, another one-shot adenovirus vector vaccine with 66% efficacy in a global trial. Convidecia is similar to other viral vector vaccines like AZD1222, Gam-COVID-Vac, and Ad26.COV2.S. Its single-dose regimen and normal refrigerator storage requirement (2° to 8 °C) could make it a favorable vaccine option for many countries. In May 2022, the World Health Organization issued an emergency use listing for the vaccine.

A Phase I study published in The Lancet showed two doses of a nebulised version of Convidecia (inhaled through the mouth) resulted in neutralising antibody responses similar to the existing one-dose injection.

Convidecia and the Pakistani version called PakVac are approved for use by some countries in Asia, Europe, and Latin America. Production capacity for Ad5-NCov should reach 500 million doses in 2021. Manufacturing will take place in China, with filling and finishing of the vaccine additionally also taking place in Malaysia, Mexico, and Pakistan.

== Efficacy ==
In February 2021, data released from an interim analysis of Phase III trials with 30,000 participants and 101 COVID cases showed that globally, the vaccine administered as an intramuscular injection had an efficacy of 65.7% at preventing moderate cases of COVID-19 and 90.98% efficacy at preventing severe cases. In the Pakistan trial subset, the vaccine had an efficacy of 74.8% at preventing symptomatic cases, and 100% for preventing severe disease.

While the efficacy rates were lower than the Pfizer–BioNTech and Moderna vaccines, its single-dose regimen and normal refrigerator storage requirement (2 to 8 °C) could make it a favorable option for many countries. It has similar efficacy to the Janssen vaccine, another one-shot adenovirus vaccine found to be 66% effective in a global trial.

== Pharmacology ==
Convidecia is a viral vector vaccine similar to AstraZeneca's AZD1222 and Gamaleya's Gam-COVID-Vac.

== Manufacturing ==
Ad5-nCOV can be stored in less extreme cold conditions compared to mRNA vaccines.

In February, Chen Wei, who lead the development of the vaccine, said annual production capacity for Ad5-NCov could reach 500 million doses in 2021.

In February, Mexico received the first batch of active ingredients for Convidecia, which is being filled and finished in Querétaro by Drugmex.

In Malaysia, filling and finishing of the vaccine for distribution would be completed by Solution Biologics.

In May, Pakistan began filling and finishing 3 million doses a month at the National Institute of Health, which would be branded as PakVac for domestic distribution.

If the vaccine is approved in Russia, Petrovax said it has the ability to fill and finish 4 million doses per month to start with, eventually reaching a target of 10 million doses a month in 2021. The company eventually hopes to build a plant within 3 years to manufacture Convidecia in Russia.

== History ==
=== Clinical trials ===
==== Phase I-II ====
In early 2020, Chen Wei led a joint team of the Institute of Biotechnology, the Academy of Military Medical Sciences, and CanSino Biologics to develop AD5-nCOV. According to the Chinese state media, the team registered an experimental COVID-19 vaccine for Phase I trial in China on 17 March 2020, to test its safety. The trial was conducted on 108 healthy adults aged 18 to 60 in two medical facilities in Wuhan, Hubei province.

In April, Ad5-nCoV became the first COVID-19 vaccine candidate in the world to begin Phase II trials. The Phase II trial results were published in the peer-reviewed journal The Lancet in August 2020, and noted neutralizing antibody and T cell responses based on statistical analyses of data involving 508 eligible participants. In September, Zeng Guang, chief scientist of the Chinese Center for Disease Control and Prevention, said the amount of COVID-19 antibodies in subjects from the Phase I trials remained high six months after the first shot. Zeng said the high levels of antibodies suggested the shots may provide immunity for an extended period of time, although Phase III results were still required. On September 24, CanSino began Phase IIb trials on 481 participants to evaluate the safety and immunogenicity of Ad5-nCoV for children ages 6–17 and elderly individuals ages 56 and above.

In August, China's National Intellectual Property Administration issued the country's first COVID-19 vaccine patent to CanSino.

On 16 May 2020, Canadian Prime Minister Justin Trudeau announced Health Canada had approved Phase II trials to be conducted by the Canadian Center for Vaccinology (CCfV) on the COVID-19 vaccine produced by CanSino. Scott Halperin, director of the CCfV, said the vaccine would not be the only one going into clinical trials in Canada, and any potential vaccine would not be publicly available until after Phase 3 is complete. If the vaccine trials were successful, then the National Research Council would work with CanSino to produce and distribute the vaccine in Canada. In August 2020, the National Research Council disclosed the vaccine had not been approved by Chinese customs to ship to Canada, after which the collaboration between CanSino and the Canadian Center for Vaccinology was abandoned.

==== Trials of inhaled version (Convidecia Air) ====
In September 2020, CanSino began a Phase I trial in China with 144 adults to determine safety and immunogenicity when inhaled through the mouth with nebulizer rather than intramuscular injection, with results published in 2021. On June 3, 2021, expansion of clinical trials was approved by the NMPA and the nasal spray applied for Emergency Use Listing.

In July 2021, results published in The Lancet showed two doses of the inhaled version resulted in neutralising antibody responses similar to the existing one-dose injection and recommended the efficacy and cost-effectiveness of the nasal vaccine to be evaluated in Phase II/III studies.

In September 2022, CanSino announced that Convidecia Air had been approved as a booster Covid-19 vaccine in China. Rollout of inhaled boosters was underway in October.

==== Phase III ====
In August 2020, Saudi Arabia confirmed it would begin Phase III trials on 5,000 people for Ad5-nCoV in the cities of Riyadh, Dammam, and Mecca.

In October 2020, Mexico began Phase III trials on 15,000 volunteers.

In September 2020, Russia began Phase III trials on 500 volunteers, which Petrovax later received approval from the government to expand to 8,000 more volunteers.

In September 2020, Pakistan began Phase III trials on 40,000 volunteers as part of a global multi-center study. As of December, about 13,000 volunteers have participated in trials of Ad5-nCoV.

In November 2020, Chile began Phase III trials on 5,200 volunteers to be managed by the University of La Frontera.

In December 2020, Argentina's Fundación Huésped began Phase III trials in 11 health centers in the metropolitan area of Buenos Aires and Mar del Plata.

==== Combination trials ====
In April 2021, a new trial was registered in Jiangsu involving one dose of Convidecia followed by a dose of ZF2001 28 or 56 days later using different technologies as a way to further boost efficacy.

In July, 2021, Cansino said it would begin combination trials with a dose of Sputnik V followed by a dose of Convidecia. This would address a supply shortage of Sputnik V, which has had difficulties in supplying the second dose in sufficient quantities compared to the first dose.

=== Authorizations ===
On 25 June 2020, China approved the vaccine for limited use by the military. In February 2021, China approved the vaccine for general use.

In February 2021, Mexico approved the vaccine for emergency use.

In February 2021, Pakistan approved the vaccine for emergency use.

In March, Hungary approved the vaccine for emergency use.

In March, Moldova authorized use of the vaccine.

On 15 June 2021, Malaysia's National Pharmaceutical Regulatory Agency (NPRA) has issued conditional registration for emergency use of the vaccine.

On 7 September 2021, National Agency of Drug and Food Control (BPOM) has issued emergency use authorization in Indonesia.

On 4 September 2022, China's National Medical Products Administration granted approval for the Convidecia Air, an inhaled version of the Convidecia vaccine, to be used as a booster dose.

== Economics ==
=== Americas ===
In December 2020, Mexico's Foreign Minister Marcelo Ebrard signed an agreement for 35 million doses. Mexico received active ingredients for 2 million doses with a total of 6 million doses expected to arrive in February.

In June 2021, Argentina approved emergency use of the vaccine and ordered 5.4 million doses.

In October 2021, Brazil's Biomm SA signed a deal to distribute the vaccine in Brazil, which included producing the vaccine domestically.

In March, Chile signed a deal for 1.8 million doses for delivery between May and June, for which emergency use approval was granted in April.

In June, Ecuador approved emergency use and ordered 6 million doses for delivery between June and August 2021.

=== Asia ===
In October 2020, Indonesia reached an agreement with CanSino to deliver 100,000 doses in November 2020, with the expectation that an additional 15 to 20 million doses would be delivered in 2021.

In February 2021, Malaysia's Solution Biologics agreed to supply 3.5 million Convidecia doses to the government. The doses would be delivered starting in April with 500,000 complete doses, with the rest in bulk to be finished by Solution Biologics.

In February 2021, Pakistan purchased 20 million doses of the vaccine of which the first 3 million doses were to arrive in May.

In June 2021, Malaysia's coordinating minister for COVID-19 Immunisation, Khairy Jamaluddin, confirmed refugee communities in Malaysia would receive the vaccine; with the first shipment due to arrive in late July. By 19 September 2021, more than 70,000 people in Malaysia had received the Convidecia vaccine. The COVID-19 Immunisation Task Force has prioritised the single-dose vaccine for communities living in remote areas including the Orang Asli as well as the homeless and undocumented individuals. Priority states for the CanSino vaccine included Sabah, Johor, Kedah, Kelantan, Perak, Sabah, and Terengganu.
