= Fill and finish =

Manufacturing process

In the pharmaceutical industry, fill and finish (also referred to as fill finish, fill-finish or fill/finish) is the process of filling vials with vaccine, biological and pharmaceutical Drug Substances (DS) and finishing the process of packaging the medicine for distribution. Many vaccine manufacturers use third parties to fill and finish their vaccines.

The fill/finish process is a common bottleneck in the manufacturing and deployment of vaccines.

To address this problem, in 2013 the U.S. federal government created the Fill Finish Manufacturing Network, a network of third-party provider contracts intended to perform fill and finish operations for vaccines against future infectious diseases. As part of its response to the COVID-19 pandemic, the UK government has provided financial support for fill and finish operations.
