= Infodemiology =

Internet-based health research

Infodemiology was defined by Gunther Eysenbach in the early 2000s as information epidemiology. It is an area of science research focused on scanning the internet for user-contributed health-related content, with the ultimate goal of improving public health. Later, it is also defined as the science of mitigating public health problems resulting from an infodemic.

Infodemiology is a part of a broader group of methods that use digital data for public health studies. In literature and research, similar words like infoveillance and digital epidemiology are sometimes talked about together, although they do not always have the same meaning. Eysenbach explained infodemiology as wide-ranging research on the spread or causes of health information in electronic media. This includes trends in search activity, online communication, publication trends. On the other hand, infoveillance is more pointed towards using this kind of data and technique for surveillance purposes. Infodemiology should be separate from infodemic. An infodemic refers to a situation where there is an overload of information, including incorrect or deceptive data, which can spread during a public health emergency or a disease outbreak.

== Origin of term ==
Eysenbach first used the term in the context of measuring and predicting the quality of health information on the Web (i.e., measuring the "supply" side of information). He later included in his definition methods and techniques which are designed to automatically measure and track health information "demand" (e.g., by analyzing search queries) as well as "supply" (e.g., by analyzing postings on webpages, in blogs, and news articles, for example through GPHIN) on the Internet with the overarching goal of informing public health policy and practice. In 2013, the Infovigil Project was launched in an effort to bring the research community together to help realize this goal. It is funded by the Canadian Institutes of Health Research.

Eysenbach demonstrated his point by showing a correlation between flu-related searches on Google (demand data) and flu-incidence data. The method is shown to be better and more timely (i.e., can predict public health events earlier) than traditional syndromic surveillance methods such as reports by sentinel physicians.

== Application ==
Researchers have applied an infodemiological approach to studying the spread of HIV/AIDS, SARS, especially SARS-CoV-2 during the COVID-19 pandemic, and influenza, vaccination uptake, antibiotics consumption, the incidence of multiple sclerosis, patterns of alcohol consumption, the efficacy of using the social web for personalization of health treatment, the contexts of status epilepticus patients, factors of Abdominal pain and its impact on quality of life and the effectiveness of the Great American Smokeout anti-smoking awareness event. In 2023, the World Health Organization reported on the use of social media listening approaches, including Pulsar, Sprout Social and EIOS to analyse large volumes of online health discourse and identify emerging misinformation trends such as vaccine hesitancy across multiple countries.

Applications outside the field of health care include urban planning and the study of economic trends and voter preferences. Infodemiology plays a role in understanding how people seek out health-related information online and how this impacts public health outcomes. As technologies that people use continues to advance, it will becomes relevant for researchers to utilize infodemiological approaches in order to stay informed about emerging health trends in the digital world. One of the main goals of infodemiology is to provide real-time information about public health trends and behaviors. By analyzing user-generated content on the internet, researchers can gain insights into people's attitudes towards health issues and track the spread of diseases or outbreaks. This information can then be used to inform public health policies and interventions. There are also challenges associated with infodemiology. One major concern is the reliability and accuracy of online information. With the rise of fake news and misinformation on the internet, it is important for researchers to carefully evaluate the data sources.

== Methods ==
Infodemiology utilizes a variety of methods and techniques, including data mining, natural language processing, machine learning, and social network analysis. It also involves collaboration between different disciplines such as public health, computer science, sociology, and psychology.

== See also ==
- Infoveillance
- Global Public Health Intelligence Network
- Infodemic
- Participatory surveillance
