= Google Trends =

Popularity analysis of search queries

- Website type: Search analysis
- Available in: English, Spanish, Portuguese, Chinese, French, and more
- Owner: Google
- Creator: Google
- Website: trends.google.com/trends
- Launched: May 11, 2006; 20 years ago
- Current status: Active

Google Trends is a website by Google that provides users the ability to analyze the popularity of top search queries in Google Search as well as YouTube across various regions, time ranges, and categories. The website uses timeline and average graphs to compare the relative search interest of compared queries over a certain period of time.

In 2001, Google published Google Zeitgeist, an annual year-end report of top searches. Later, they renamed it Google's Year in Search in 2013.

On August 5, 2008, Google launched Google Insights for Search, a more sophisticated and advanced service displaying search trends data. On September 27, 2012, Google merged Google Insights for Search into Google Trends.

== History ==
=== 2000s ===
Originally, Google neglected updating Google Trends on a regular basis. In March 2007, internet bloggers noticed that Google had not added new data since November 2006, and Trends was updated within a week. Google did not update Trends from March until July 30, and only after it was blogged about, again. Google now claims to be "updating the information provided by Google Trends daily; Hot Trends is updated hourly." As of April 2025, data on the Google Trends website shows updates every minute, with a 4 minute delay, when the timeline parameter is set to "Past hour."

On August 6, 2008, Google launched a free service called Insights for Search. Insights for Search is an extension of Google Trends and although the tool is meant for marketers, it can be utilized by any user. The tool allows for the tracking of various words and phrases that are typed into Google's search-box. The tracking device provided a more in-depth analysis of results. It also has the ability to categorize and organize the data, with special attention given to the breakdown of information by geographical areas. In 2012, Google Insights for Search was merged into Google Trends with a new interface.

Google Trends does not provide absolute values for the number of search queries, but instead shows relative search volumes (RSV). The relative search volumes are normalised to the highest value, which is set to 100. Seeing absolute search volumes requires a separate browser extension that overlays absolute numbers onto Google Trends' y-axis. The popularity of up to 5 search terms or search topics can be compared directly. Additional comparisons require a comparison term or topic. In contrast to search terms, search topics are "a group of terms that have the same concept in any language".

In 2009, Yossi Matias et al. published research on the predictability of search trends.

=== 2010s ===
In a series of articles in The New York Times, Seth Stephens-Davidowitz used Google Trends to measure a variety of behaviors. For example, in June 2012, he argued that search volume for the word "nigger(s)" could be used to measure racism in different parts of the United States. Correlating this measure with Obama's vote share, he calculated that Obama lost about 4 percentage points due to racial animus in the 2008 presidential election. He also used Google data, along with other sources, to estimate the size of the gay population. This article noted that the most popular search beginning "is my husband" is "is my husband gay?" In addition, he found that American parents were more likely to search "is my son gifted?" than "is my daughter gifted?" But they were more likely to search "is my daughter overweight?" than "is my son overweight?" He also examined cultural differences in attitudes around pregnancy.

Google Trends has also been used to forecast economic indicators, and financial markets, and analysis of Google Trends data has detected regional flu outbreaks before conventional monitoring systems. Google Trends has also been used in marketing research to track consumer preferences and to measure the effects of advertising through online information search. Google Trends is increasingly used in ecological and conservation studies, with the number of research articles growing over 50% per year. Google Trends data has been used to examine trends in public interest and awareness on biodiversity and conservation issues, species bias in conservation project, and identify cultural aspects of environmental issues. The data obtained from Google Trends has also been used to track changes in the timing biological processes as well as the geographic patterns of biological invasion.

A 2011 study found that an indicator for private consumption based on search query time series provided by Google Trends found that in almost all conducted forecasting experiments, the Google indicator outperformed survey-based indicators. Evidence is provided by Jeremy Ginsberg et al. that Google Trends data can be used to track influenza-like illness in a population. Because the relative frequency of certain queries is highly correlated with the percentage of physician visits in which a patient presents with influenza-like symptoms, an estimate of weekly influenza activity can be reported. A more sophisticated model for inferring influenza rates from Google Trends, capable of overcoming the mistakes of its predecessors has been proposed by Lampos et al.

The use of Google Trends to study a wide range of medical topics is becoming more widespread. Studies have been performed examining such diverse topics as use of tobacco substitutes, suicide occurrence, asthma, and parasitic diseases. In an analogous concept of using health queries to predict the flu, Google Flu Trends was created. Further research should extend the utility of Google Trends in healthcare.

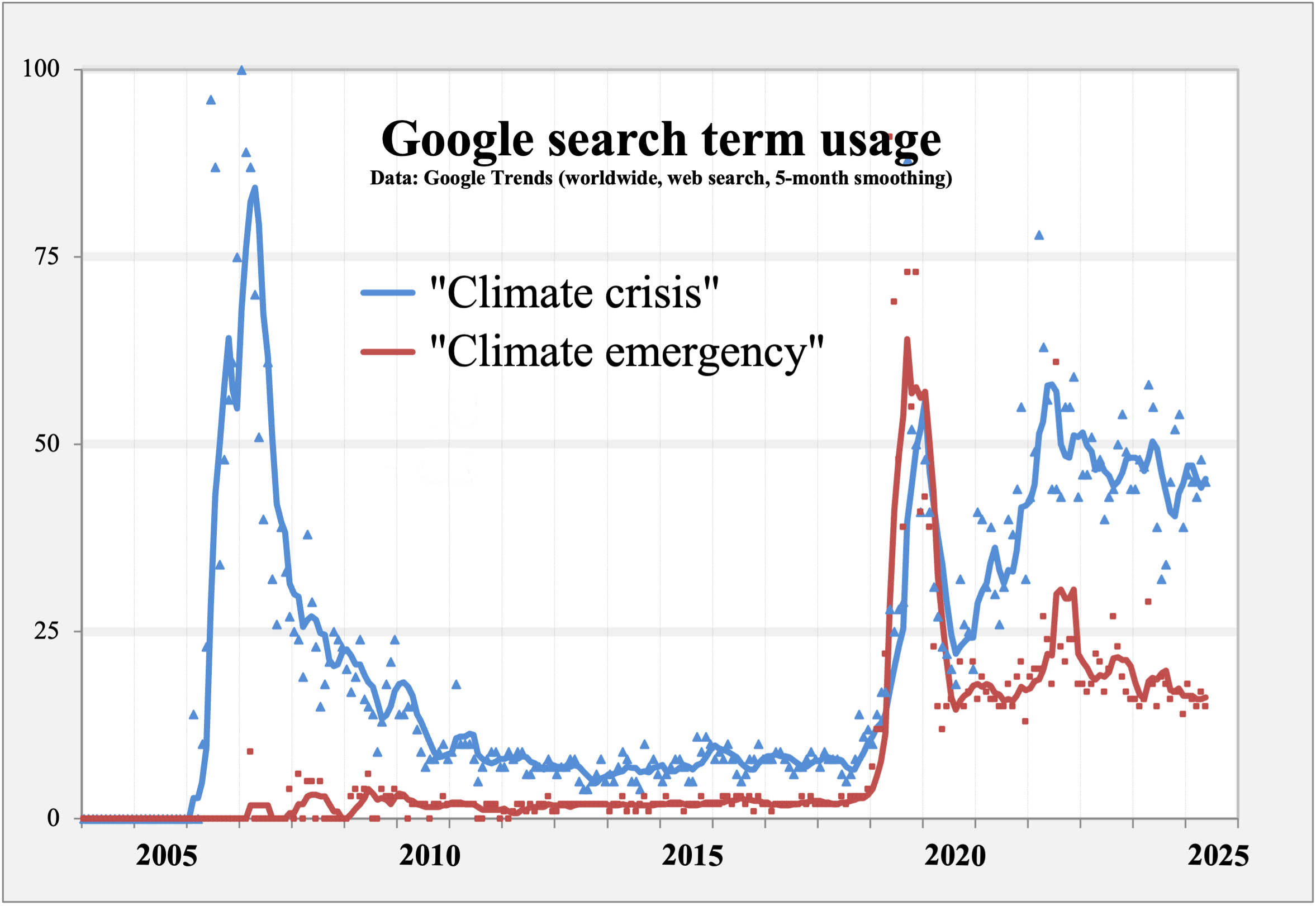
Google Trends allows the user to compare the relative search volume between two or more terms. Shown: following the 2006 release of Al Gore's film, An Inconvenient Truth, there was an increase in the number of Google searches for the term climate crisis, providing a measure of the film's influence. In 2019, governments made climate emergency declarations in larger numbers, years after the first one in 2016.

Furthermore, it was shown by Tobias Preis et al. that there is a correlation between Google Trends data of company names and transaction volumes of the corresponding stocks on a weekly time scale.

In April 2012, Tobias Preis, Helen Susannah Moat, H. Eugene Stanley and Steven R. Bishop used Google Trends data to demonstrate that Internet users from countries with a higher per capita gross domestic product (GDP) are more likely to search for information about the future than information about the past. The findings, published in the journal Scientific Reports, suggest there may be a link between online behaviour and real-world economic indicators. The authors of the study examined Google search queries made by Internet users in 45 countries in 2010 and calculated the ratio of the volume of searches for the coming year ('2011') to the volume of searches for the previous year ('2009'), which they call the 'future orientation index'. They compared the future orientation index to the per capita GDP of each country and found a strong tendency for countries in which Google users enquire more about the future to exhibit a higher GDP. The results hint that there may potentially be a relationship between the economic success of a country and the information-seeking behaviour of its citizens online. In April 2013, Tobias Preis and his colleagues Helen Susannah Moat and H. Eugene Stanley introduced a method to identify online precursors for stock market moves, using trading strategies based on search volume data provided by Google Trends. Their analysis of Google search volume for 98 terms of varying financial relevance, published in Scientific Reports, suggests that increases in search volume for financially relevant search terms tend to precede large losses in financial markets. The analysis of Tobias Preis was later found to be misleading and the results are most likely to be overfitted. The group of Damien Challet tested the same methodology with unrelated to financial markets search words, such as terms for diseases, car brands or computer games. They have found that all these classes provide equally good "predictability" of the financial markets as the original set. For example, the search terms like "bone cancer", "Shelby GT 500" (car brand), "Moon Patrol" (computer game) provide even better performance as those selected in original work.

In 2019, Tom Cochran, from public relations firm 720 Strategies, conducted a study comparing Google Trends to political polling. The study was in response to Pete Buttigieg's surge in a poll of Iowa's likely Democratic caucusgoers conducted between November 8 to 13 by the Des Moines Register. Using Google Trends, he looked into the relationship between polling numbers and Google searches. His findings concluded that, while polling consists of far smaller sample sizes, the primary difference with Google Trends is that it only demonstrates intent to seek information. Google search volume was higher for candidates having higher polling numbers, but the correlation did not mean increased candidate favorability.

=== 2020s ===
The early years of the 2020s were marked by the emergence of the novel Coronavirus (SARS-CoV-2) that would eventually become known as the Coronavirus Disease 2019 (COVID-19) pandemic. Consequently, research based on accessible data in the context of infodemiological studies has become increasingly prevalent, with Google Trends data proving to be a suitable tool for such surveys. Corresponding studies on the COVID-19 pandemic were set up to investigate and possibly predict the waves and spread.

After a basic framework for using Google Trends had already been developed by 2019, this work was continued in the 2020s and existing limitations and possible solutions for scientific use were published. Eysenbach further defined the field of infodemiology and, in connection with the pandemic, also addressed the mass dissemination of information, the infodemic.

== Characteristics ==
Research also shows that Google Trends can be used to forecast stock returns and volatility over a short horizon. Other research has shown that Google Trends has strong predictive power for macroeconomic series. For example, a paper published in 2020 shows that a large panel of Google Trends predictors can forecast employment growth in the United States at both the national and state level with a relatively high degree of accuracy even a year in advance.

Google Trends uses representative sub-samples for analysis, which means that the data can vary depending on the time of the survey and is associated with background noise. Therefore, repeating analyses at different points in time can increase the reliability of the analysis. It was shown that Google Trends data can exhibit a high variability when queried at different points in time, indicating that it may not be reliable except for very high-volume search terms due to sampling, and relying on this data for prediction is risky. In 2020, this research made it to major headlines in Germany.

== Search quotas ==
Google has incorporated quota limits for Trends searches. This limits the number of search attempts available per user/IP/device. Details of quota limits have not yet been provided, but it may depend on geographical location or browser privacy settings. It has been reported in some cases that this quota is reached very quickly if one is not logged into a Google account before trying to access the Trends service.

== Google Trends Trending Now ==
Google Trends Trending Now is an addition to Google Trends displaying Google Search queries that are experiencing a recent surge in search interest among all recent searches and that are related to a news story (sometimes referred to as a grouping, or a cluster, and can be about a person, event or other newsworthy story). It leverages a cutting-edge trend forecasting engine, detecting 10 times as many emerging trends as before and refreshing every 10 minutes on average, letting users see the latest upward Search swings right as they take off. Trending Now is available for 125 countries and for regions in selected countries. It provides users the ability to filter trends that are more recent (4 hours ago), as well as looking at trends from the past 24 hours, 48 hours, and even 1 week back. Trending Now uses fresh trends data, being refreshed on average every ten minutes.

== Google Hot Trends ==
Google Hot Trends has not been live for many years now (it was replaced by Daily Search Trends and Realtime Trends which were replaced by the Trending Now page in August 2024). It was an addition to Google Trends which displayed the top 20 "hot", i.e., fastest rising, searches (search-terms) of the past hour in various countries. This was for searches that have recently experienced a sudden surge in popularity. For each of the search-terms, it provided a 24-hour search-volume graph as well as blog, news and web search results. Hot Trends had a history feature for those wishing to browse past hot searches. Hot Trends allowed installing it as an iGoogle Gadget. Hot Trends was also available as an hourly Atom web feed.

== Google Trends for websites ==
Since 2008, there has been a sub-section of Google Trends which analyses traffic for websites, rather than traffic for search terms. This is a similar service to that provided by Alexa Internet.

The Google Trends for Websites became unavailable after the September 27, 2012, release of the new Google Trends product.

== Google Trends API ==
An API to accompany the Google Trends service was announced by Marissa Mayer, then vice president of search-products and user experience at Google. This was announced in 2007. A new version of the Google Trends API was announced in July 2025.

== Implications of data ==
A group of researchers at Wellesley College examined data from Google Trends and analyzed how effective a tool it could be in predicting U.S. Congress elections in 2008 and 2010. In highly contested races where data for both candidates were available, the data successfully predicted the outcome in 33.3% of cases in 2008 and 39% in 2010. The authors conclude that, compared to the traditional methods of election forecasting, incumbency and New York Times polls, and even in comparison with random chance, Google Trends did not prove to be a good predictor of either the 2008 or 2010 elections. Another group has also explored possible implications for financial markets and suggested possible ways to combine insights from Google Trends with other concepts in technical analysis.

In 2020, the OECD announced it had used Google Trends data to create a real-time tracker of economic activity and GDP growth, through online search patterns for topics like unemployment, housing, and consumption. In May 2026, What We Ask Google will be published by Google's data editor Simon Rogers, exploring the connections between everyday searches.

== See also ==
- Alexa Internet
- Google Insights for Search
- Google Ngram Viewer
- Wikipedia pageviews
- Keyword research
