= Infodemic =

Rapid spread of accurate and inaccurate information

An infodemic is a rapid and far-reaching spread of both accurate and inaccurate information about certain issues. The word is a portmanteau of information and epidemic and is used as a metaphor to describe how misinformation and disinformation can spread like a virus from person to person and affect people like a disease. This term, originally coined in 2003 by David Rothkopf, rose to prominence in 2020 during the COVID-19 pandemic.

== History ==
In his 11 May 2003 article in The Washington Post—also published in Newsday, The Record of New Jersey, the Oakland Tribune, and the China Daily—foreign policy expert David Rothkopf, referred to the information epidemic—or "infodemic", in the context of the 2002–2004 SARS outbreak. The outbreak of SARS, which was caused by severe acute respiratory syndrome coronavirus 1 began in a remote region in Guangdong, China, in November 2002. By the time the outbreak ended in May 2003, it had reached 30 countries and there were over 8,000 confirmed cases and 774 deaths.

Rothkopf, who was at that time, a member of the advisory committee's board of directors at the Johns Hopkins Bloomberg School of Public Health's Johns Hopkins Center for Health Security which provides policy recommendations to the United States government and the World Health Organization, said that the infodemic was the second of two concurrent epidemics. Rothkopf described how the "information epidemic" transformed SARS from a regional health crisis into a "debacle" that spread globally with both economic and social repercussions. He said this infodemic "was not the rapid spread of simple news via the media, nor is it simply the rumor mill on steroids. Rather, as with SARS, it is a complex phenomenon caused by the interaction of mainstream media, specialist media and internet sites, and 'informal' media, which is to say wireless phones, text messaging, pagers, faxes, and e-mail, all transmitting some combination of fact, rumor, interpretation, and propaganda." Rothkopf citing the State Department, said that 2002 was the "year of the most heightened state of terrorism panic in our history" even though terrorism globally had decreased to its "lowest level since 1969". His company, the Washington DC–based strategic intelligence and analysis firm Intellibridge, which he had founded in 1999, tracked the January 2003 Chinese reports on the outbreak. On 9 February 2003, Intellibridge provided their analysis to the U.S. defense community, and then posted the information on ProMED-mail, a Federation of American Scientists website.

The general public did not learn of the outbreak until 23 February 2003, when an elderly woman died of SARS in her home in Toronto, Canada, from Hong Kong. Her son, who spread the disease in a Toronto hospital, also died. With the first death in North America, the Western media began to cover the outbreak. Rothkopf said that if more had been done earlier to manage the disease as well as information about SARS, perhaps there might not have been a worldwide panic. The infodemic spread globally, far beyond the countries that had SARS victims and "set off a chain reaction of economic and social consequences". It also made it harder for health organizations to control the SARS epidemic as panic spread online.

In his 15 December 2002 article entitled "Infodemiology: The epidemiology of (mis)information" in The American Journal of Medicine, health researcher Gunther Eysenbach coined the term infodemiologist and later used the term to refer to attempts at digital disease detection.

Use of the term infodemic increased rapidly during the COVID-19 pandemic. A study found that from 2010-2020 there were 61 articles mentioning the word infodemic, while between 2020 and 2021 there were 14,301 published stories using the term. The United Nations and the World Health Organization began using the term infodemic during the COVID-19 pandemic as early as 2 February 2020. The related term disinfodemic (referring to COVID-19 disinformation campaigns) has been used by UNESCO. By the time that the Journal of Medical Internet Research published their June 2020 issue featuring the WHO's framework for managing the infodemic related to the COVID-19 pandemic, the WHO and public health agencies had acknowledged infodemiology as an "emerging scientific field" that was of critical importance during a pandemic. By 2021, the WHO had published a number of resources clarifying the infodemic. At the Fourth WHO Global Infodemic Management Conference in 2023, the World Health Organization demonstrated large-scale taxonomic segmentation of health-related social media discourse using Pulsar, categorising posts into conceptual segments covering causes, illness narratives, treatments, and public health interventions, to provide early warnings of emerging health risks and misinformation including vaccine hesitancy across multiple countries.

A Royal Society and British Academy joint report published in October 2020 said of infodemics that: "COVID-19 vaccine deployment faces an infodemic with misinformation often filling the knowledge void, characterised by: (1) distrust of science and selective use of expert authority, (2) distrust in pharmaceutical companies and government, (3) straightforward explanations, (4) use of emotion; and, (5) echo chambers," and to combat the ill and "inoculate the public" endorsed Singapore's Protection from Online Falsehoods and Manipulation Act 2019, which criminalises misinformation. The Aspen Institute even started their misinformation project before the pandemic.

A blue-ribbon working group on infodemics, from the Forum on Information and Democracy, produced a report in November 2020, highlighting 250 recommendations to protect democracies, human rights, and health.

Merriam-Webster tracked its renewed usage during the COVID-19 pandemic.

== Definitions ==
In his 11 May 2003 article in The Washington Post, Rothkopf wrote that the information epidemic or "infodemic" was a "combination of "[a] few facts, mixed with fear, speculation, and rumor, amplified and relayed swiftly worldwide by modern information technologies."

On 2 February 2020, the World Health Organization defined infodemic as a "an over-abundance of information—some accurate and some not—that makes it hard for people to find trustworthy sources and reliable guidance when they need it." A 21 February 2021 WHO publication, said that "[a]n infodemic is too much information including false or misleading information in digital and physical environments during a disease outbreak."

Eysenbach described infodemiology as the study of "the determinants and distribution of health information and misinformation".

== Research during COVID-19 ==
As COVID-19 swept across the globe, information about how to stay safe and how to identify symptoms became vital. However, especially in the first phases of the pandemic, the amount of false, not validated and partially true information on the media was huge. Even seemingly reliable government sources did not always follow best practices in disseminating data about COVID-19, with many potentially misleading maps published on official websites. The inappropriate use of maps on these websites may have contributed to political polarization in response to COVID-19 epidemiological control measures. There was also a proliferation of systematic reviews of COVID-19-related evidence, not all of which was robustly conducted. Researchers have pointed out a few primary challenges of communicating with the public about COVID-19. First, social media platforms that prioritize engagement over accuracy and allow fringe opinions to thrive without correction create an information ecology that is difficult to understand. Second, as fast-moving science and politics intertwine during the pandemic, making decisions related to combatting misinformation becomes complicated by a volatile political environment and frequently changing scientific information. A U.S.-based survey research revealed that during March and April 2020 higher news consumption about COVID-19, especially through social media, was associated with lower levels of knowledge and more fake news beliefs. However, preliminary research published in fall 2021 suggested that visual information (e.g., infographics) about science and scientists, designed to address trust, might be able to mitigate belief in misinformation about COVID-19.

== Mitigation ==
Researchers have been seeking tools to combat infodemics. Gunther Eysenbach brings up four pillars of infodemic management: (1) information monitoring (infoveillance); (2) building eHealth literacy and science literacy capacity; (3) encouraging knowledge refinement and quality improvement processes such as fact-checking and peer-review; and (4) accurate and timely knowledge translation which minimizes distorting factors such as political or commercial influences. Scholars also advocate for tech platforms to police their content more effectively, and empower individuals to make better decisions on their own to promote the emergence of truth. Social media companies may offer a variety of cues to help people make better judgments of whether a message is legitimate or not. For example, Facebook might, in addition to showing how many "likes" a post has received, allow the count of "dislikes" to offer a more symmetric view of opinions.

Research on information dissemination during the COVID-19 pandemic identified issues with standardization and presentation of related information on official U.S. government sources, specifically state and federal government COVID-19 dashboards. When the most authoritative sources of information are not presenting the data accurately, bad conclusions are inevitable. The research suggested official sources for information take steps to ensure the way data are collected, analyzed, and presented is up to the highest standards and adheres to all conventions. Standards of web-maps for government agencies should be developed, widely published, and adhered to. The web-based maps and dashboards are, if properly employed, suggested as possible ways to combat infodemics in the future.

However, scholars emphasize that traditionally proposed ways to combat misinformation tend to rely on the assumption that if people encounter the correct information about an issue, they will make rational decisions based on the best scientific information available. Research shows that this is often not the case and that people do not act in the best interest of scientific fact for reasons including "cognitive preferences for old habits, forgetfulness, small inconveniences in the moment, preferences for the path of least resistance, and motivated reasoning." Thus, combatting misinformation should rely on a more nuanced analysis of both the content of the misinformation, as well as the socio-political environment in which it was disseminated.

== Criticism ==
Financial Times journalist Siddharth Venkataramakrishnan said in his 20 August 2021 article that casting the spread of misinformation and disinformation in terms of disease risks oversimplifying the problem and that "unlike the status of being healthy or infected by an actual disease, what constitutes accurate information is also subject to change." Venkataramakrishnan also pointed out that the focus of the infodemic has often been on "conspiracy theorists and snake-oil salesmen", largely ignoring the at times problematic actions and confusing messaging of governments and public health bodies throughout the pandemic.

Communication scholars Felix Simon and Chico Camargo at Oxford University said in their 20 July 2021 New Media & Society article that infodemic as metaphor "can be misleading, as it conflates multiple forms of social behaviour, oversimplifies a complex situation and helps constitute a phenomenon for which concrete evidence remains patchy." Pointing out that the infodemic as a concept is "journalistically powerful, intuitively satisfying, and in strong resonance with personal experiences and intuition", Simon and Camargo argue that empirical evidence for many of the claims surrounding the term is lacking. Instead of a genuine phenomenon they see the infodemic as "a territorial claim for those who want to apply their skills, a signal to others that they are working in this area, or a framing device to tie one's work to larger debates". Along the same lines, Krause, Freiling, and Scheufele warn of difficulties related to creating "an infodemic about the infodemic" and that research surrounding the term warrants clarification and acknowledgment of uncertainties related to its novelty and impact.

== In popular culture ==
In 2023 the PC videogame Infodemic: Journalism in crisis was announced by the Peruvian media and information literacy (MIL) non-governmental organization A Mí No Me La Hacen.

== See also ==
- Dead internet theory – Concept involving online bot activity
- Collective consciousness – Shared beliefs and ideas in society
- Echo chamber (media) – Situation that reinforces beliefs by repetition inside a closed system
- Filter bubble – Intellectual isolation through internet algorithms
- Information overload – Decision making with too much information
- Infoveillance – Type of syndromic surveillance using online information
- Link rot – URLs ceasing to function
- Meme – Cultural idea that spreads through imitation
  - Memetic engineering – Term based on Richard Dawkins' theory of memes
  - Memetic warfare – Propaganda warfare via Internet memes
- Propaganda – Communication used to influence opinion
