= Participatory surveillance =

Form of public health surveillance

Participatory surveillance is a form of public health surveillance in which members of the public, community workers, or other nontraditional participants report health information directly to support disease monitoring. In epidemiology, participatory surveillance complement traditional surveillance via collection of community data, often through digital symptom-reporting platforms, surveys, or local reporting networks. Most common uses are for influenza and influenza-like illness, and can promote earlier detection of outbreaks, more area coverage, and public engagement. However, it is generally used as a complement to established surveillance systems since self-reported data may be affected by bias, uneven participation, and validation challenges.

== History ==
Towards the beginning of the development of Web 2.0, an increase in online socializing and interaction emerged, largely from the function of social media platforms. Social media platforms originally emerged within the context of the online information highway, where users can control what information is available to other users of the platform. Users can now digitally attach people to locations, without having to physically be within the location, a concept coined as geotagging. With added awareness of the locations of users, an aspect of greater socialization and interconnectivity emerges within both the digital and tangible world. Since the online information highway collects and stores information more permanently than the physical world, many interactions amongst online users can last much longer than physical ones. Since users can control the information and locations in which they associate themselves, they can in part surveil themselves and others to an extent. This is participatory surveillance within a web-based paradigm.

In addition to this, participatory surveillance has begun to be referred to as a tool for ecological field research. Currently, it is extremely difficult to detect disease outbreaks in enough time to prepare people for the outcomes. Often, in hard to reach areas such as the Arctic, researchers cannot gain an intensive look into the subject of disease outbreak closely enough to gain accurate results. Indigenous peoples know the ecology of the land better and how to reach overlooked locations of research. Researchers can use these people as rural surveyors, capturing instances of disease outbreak much quicker and easier than the researchers themselves.

== Public health and epidemiology ==
Participatory surveillance is used in public health to gather information on symptoms, exposures, or events from the public or from community-based reporters. It differs from other methods like passive surveillance (which depends on reports submitted from hospitals, clinics, public health units, laboratories, or other institutions). Instead, participatory surveillance allows data to be contributed directly by individuals. These systems are often digital, but they can also involve community networks and field reporting.

Participatory surveillance systems have been used for influenza-like illness, event detection, and multisector surveillance. They have included human, animal, and environmental health. A 2022 review identified 60 ongoing participatory surveillance systems across five continents. Best-practice guidance for design, implementation, reporting, and analysis of participatory surveillance (for illnesses similar to influenza) has been published by the WHO.

Some of the epidemiologic advantages of participatory surveillance include: ability to collect information from both symptomatic and asymptomatic individuals, to capture initially untreated people, and to supplement facility-based surveillance. Some of the limitations include biases, uneven participation, and validation challenges.

=== Comparison with other surveillance approaches ===
In passive surveillance, health entities receive reports from hospitals, clinics, laboratories, public health units, and other groups that report public health data. Participatory surveillance also differs from active, sentinel, and syndromic surveillance. These are established surveillance strategies used for different public health purposes. Participatory surveillance is unique because data is contributed directly by community members, typically before formal diagnosis or beginning of treatment.

== Social media ==
=== Counter-surveillance ===
Counter-surveillance refers to surveillance-based challenges to power imbalances between individuals and institutions. Although state and industry mass surveillance has received substantial public attention in the wake of disclosures like those made by Edward Snowden about the National Security Agency, interest in activist-deployed and peer surveillance has been increasing. Whereas the average person may not fully understand the surveillance programs of larger collectivities, people are drawing upon surveillance tools themselves in interpersonal relationships and in attempts to bring about institutional accountability. Some researchers assert that by using these technologies of surveillance, the same ones used by companies to track consumer tendencies, the public is essentially feeding into practices of their own personal surveillance.

=== Empowerment ===
One argument towards social media based participatory surveillance is participatory surveillance within social digital media schemas work to emphasize the power that comes from monitoring what is surveilled of themselves in the context of others rather than being constituted as an invasion of privacy, or disempowerment. Within the visual discourse of reality television, the artistic narrative associated with presenting lives, creates a fake reality in which people can contextualize, therefore keeping the reality of some aspects of an individual or collectives' lives still privatized. This thinking can be transposed to other socially constructed media technologies. In contrast, ambient awareness is associated with cell phones since they are rarely turned off. This poses a greater security risk. Surveillance webcams focus on the aspects of what real users want to show to the digital audience. It is privatized in the respect that users control what they allow others to see causing them to feel liberated.

=== Infodemiology ===
Within the role of participatory surveillance in public health, infodemiology is a term used to describe the use of digital applications, online search behavior, and participatory reporting systems to track disease patterns and health-related information. Information people search for related to health as well as what the public says on digital-based platforms makes up the fabric of this field of study. Coming about in 2002, infodemiology measures common social media platforms, disease and illness related websites, search engine information, and any other online user-related health data. Crowdsourcing based health-related sites have also been gaining traction in infodemiology. Some include Flu Near You, Influenza.net, Guardians of Health, AfyaData, FluTracking, Vigilant-e, and Saúde na Copa. These sites usually gather information through mapping similar symptoms of users. Some sites, such as InfluenzaNet, provide incentives for users to continue tracking their symptoms or encourage their friends to start tracking theirs.

==== H1N1 virus ====
Twitter, a user-generated platform for social media, can effectively help track users' thoughts and opinions on diseases as well as help track disease at a greater rate. For example, the H1N1 virus (swine flu) outbreak in 2009 was analyzed through Twitter reactions and responses in order to investigate these areas of thought. After analyzing and comparing tweets through different severities of the H1N1 outbreak, the researchers posited that tweets can be a reliable estimate in understanding disease patterns.

The speed at which social media reveals public thought and trends is about two weeks faster than that of standardized disease surveillance through the proper health-related institutions. An example of social media reactions related to the H1N1 virus include an increased lack of discussion around antiviral drugs at approximately the same time as the H1N1 virus became less prevalent. However, due to the nature of social media as user-generated and unregulated, deciphering between what is relevant versus irrelevant material can blur generalizations and facts. Along with this, people are wavering and unreliable with when and what they post about on social media. With that, social media is an unstable variable which, in order to become standardized, would require great expense to create measures in which it would become feasible to make valid generalizations about. To elaborate using the example of Twitter, information on sickness can change meaning in a connotative sense. For example, if a user tweets about popular pop artist Justin Bieber saying they have "Bieber Fever," this is very apparently not a real sickness, but a faux sickness based on the popularity of an artist. This creates issues in organizing information, requiring complex algorithms that can analyze the contours of these social meanings. Nonetheless, a recent study noted that studies focusing on the use of Youtube to detect outbreaks only had a twenty to thirty percent range of error, leading researchers' to continue looking into the prospect of social media as a force for change in disease outbreak.

==== Chikungunya virus ====
Chikungunya virus, associated with moderate to severe skin rashes and joint pain, spread to Italy at the beginning of 2007. The outbreak caused great social concern, therefore causing a plethora of social media reactions to emerge. Using an infodemiological approach, the sites where the outbreak was recorded, specifically PubMed, Twitter, Google Trends and News, and Wikipedia views and edits all provided information into when the disease was received, the concerns associated with the outbreak, and popular opinion on the disease. Interestingly, most of the Twitter posts related to Chikungunya were highly guided by search engine queries rather than empirical investigations, leading to non-usable data. Using mediation technology, Wikipedia proved to be ineffective in determining whether the site was helpful in understanding the outbreak. Moreover, users who gained opinions on the outbreak from news sources were similar to the Wikipedia edits and reactions. Similarly, the PubMed responses were consistent with that of the Wikipedia and Twitter responses. Overall, a significant amount of information was gathered from these sources, deeming these sites to be useful in documenting disease and public reaction.

== Ecological field work ==
=== Cholera outbreak ===
In hard to access regions such as the Arctic and rural Canada, researching ecological processes and disease spread can be difficult without constant monitoring. Indigenous populations have become a key aspect in understanding the spread of disease, due to their proximity and connection to the land. For example, the Inuit populations' observations during the outbreak of avian cholera helped identify specific zones of infection in Arctic Canada. Specifically, the Common Eider, a species of sea duck, was being tracked to understand an increase in mortality from the disease. The Inuit were the first to report the increase in deaths, due to their reliance on Common Eider for meat, feathers, and eggs. With support from the Cape Dorset, Iqaluit, Aupaluk, Kangirsuk, Kangiqsujuaq, and Ivujivik Inuit communities, the researchers were able to detect the outbreak of avian cholera in thirteen locations from 2004 to 2016. The Inuit peoples were able to keep a closer eye on death rates of the Common Eider due to their daily routines and subsistence on the duck.

== Privacy concerns ==
As digital technology advances with many dangers associated to privacy, individuals are attempting to be more accountable when meeting others. Background check websites and search engine sources reveal just how many people attempt to find information on another person, whatever the reason. Many researchers altogether ignore the idea of privacy when analyzing methods of participatory surveillance. More so, from a social media perspective, some researchers claim that by openly sharing information with others, this cannot be deemed a breach of privacy. However, a few researchers on the topic mention breaches of privacy within the spheres of both digital media studies and infodemiology.

=== Infodemiology ===
Infodemiology relies on users' information to analyze health patterns and public health concerns. However, the legality behind using other people's information without their consent can cause serious ethical privacy violations. However, limitations such as individual privacy concerns and unreliable information cause participatory digital information to sometimes be inaccurate and hard to differentiate from truth.

=== Doxing ===
Doxing is a form of cyberbullying, using the Internet to post private information about an individual or organization as a means of attack against the entity. Common information that can be leaked can be anything from a past indiscretion, home address, or even social security number of the victim. This information could be freely available on the internet for the attacker to access and further publicize. This differentiates it from other types of information leaks, since the information is simply being brought to the forefront of the public's awareness. In other words, the public information being leaked could be found freely by other parties even if it was not exposed in a more public light. The term "doxing" comes from the origins of document, first used in 2001 with the infamous hacker collective called Anonymous.

With today's current laws, most legislation pertaining to cyber threats and attacks are rooted in the 1990s, when the Internet was just developing. Due to information being stored online, doxing does not adhere to standard rights of privacy, and may be a breach of legal purpose limitation principles — data posted online may not be freely used for any purpose, even if it is publicly available, and consent cannot be assumed.

From the US constitutional perspective, individuals should have the right to disclose or not disclose information, while at the same time being able to make decisions about privacy. The US First Amendment protects the right to free speech, but doxing uniquely uses information available to the public, leading some 'doxers' to claim that they are simply exercising their First Amendment rights. The only exception to First Amendment rights came about from Cohen v. California, which established the "true threat" exception. This exception established a breach of free speech rights whenever the content of the speech maliciously invades privacy interests. However, this exception may only work in some doxing situations, where the court measures the extent of the offense and the reactions from the attack.

In the EU and UK, the GDPR privacy law gives personal data special protection, so that any data which can identify an individual must only be processed or used if one of the specified legal reasons allow it.

== See also ==
- Digital privacy
- Infoveillance
- Open-source intelligence
- Revenge porn
- Search engine privacy
- Shadow profile
- Sousveillance
- Swatting
