= Yossi Matias =

Israeli computer scientist

- יוסי מטיאס
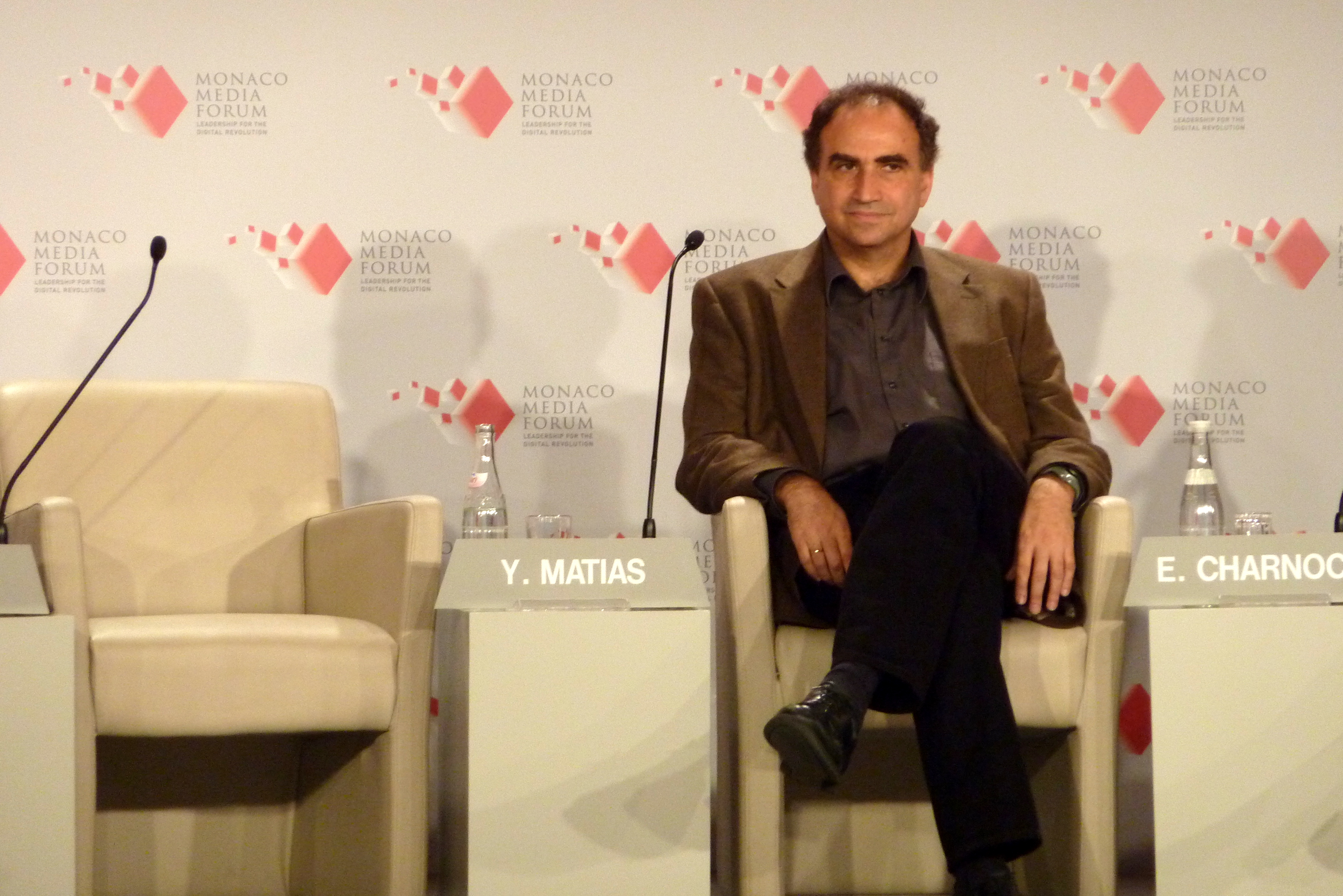
- Known for: Streaming Algorithms, Sketches, Google Trends, Google Autocomplete, Conversational AI, Google Duplex, AI for Social Good, Flood Forecasting, Speculative Decoding, LLM Factuality Med-Palm, AI Co-Scientist
- Awards: Gödel Prize, ACM Fellow, Paris Kanellakis Theory and Practice Award
- Scientific career
- Fields: Computer Science
- Institutions: Google, Weizmann Institute of Science, Tel Aviv University

Yossi Matias (Hebrew: יוסי מטיאס) is an Israeli-American computer scientist, entrepreneur, and technology executive. He serves as Vice President of Engineering & Research at Google and is the Head of Google Research. Matias was the founding managing director of Google's Center in Israel.

Matias has been part of the leadership team of Google Research, serving as the global executive lead for initiatives in Health AI, Crisis Response, and Climate AI, and leads work in Conversational AI.

For more than a decade, he was a key figure in Google Search leadership, helping develop and oversee products and features including Google Trends, Google Autocomplete, Search Console, and search experiences related to weather, sports, and dictionaries. In 2024, Matias relocated to Silicon Valley to lead Google Research globally, overseeing the company's worldwide research activities.

Matias established the Research and Development Center of Google in Israel. growing it to over 2500 on staff, with efforts working on Search, AI, Waze, Cloud and Chip design. He led the development of Google products such as Google Trends, Google Insights for Search, Google Suggest, Google Visualization API, Ephemeral IDs for IoT.

He led efforts in Conversational AI including Google Duplex, Call Screen, Live Caption, Live Relay, Recorder, and Euphonia. He led development of Generative AI breakthroughs including Speculative Decoding and Factuality, and led advancing Healthcare and Scientific discovery with AI including Med-Palm, AMIE, MedGemma, and AI Co-Scientist.

He pioneered an initiative to bring cultural and heritage collections online, such as the Yad Vashem Holocaust Memorial Museum archive, the Dead Sea Scrolls, and the Nelson Mandela Archive, which along with Google Art Project seeded up Google Cultural Institute. He is leading a global initiative for Crisis Response and Flood Forecasting.

Matias is the executive lead and founder of Google's Campus Tel Aviv, a technology hub for promoting innovation and entrepreneurship and birthplace of programs such as Campus for Moms and LaunchPad, which has evolved into Launchpad Accelerator, and LaunchPad Studio for AI & ML focused startups. He is a founding lead of Google's AI for Social Good initiative.

Prof. Matias is on the computer science faculty at Tel Aviv University, and previously a research scientist at Bell Labs and a visiting professor at Stanford. He published over 200 papers in diverse areas including data analysis, algorithms for massive data sets, data streams and synopses, parallel algorithms and systems, data compression, data and information management systems, security and privacy, video processing, Internet technologies, AI for health, machine learning and language models. He is the inventor of over 80 patents. He pioneered some of the early technologies for the effective analysis of big data, internet privacy and contextual search.

Matias is a recipient of Gödel Prize, an ACM Fellow and a recipient of Paris Kanellakis Theory and Practice Award for seminal work on the foundations of streaming algorithms and their application to large scale data analytics.
