= Infoveillance =

Type of syndromic surveillance using online information

Infoveillance is a type of syndromic surveillance that specifically utilizes information found online. The term, along with the term infodemiology, was coined by Gunther Eysenbach to describe research that uses online information to gather information about human behavior.

Eysenbach's work using Google Search queries led to the birth of Google Flu Trends, and other search engines have also been used. Other researchers have utilized social media sites such as Twitter to observe disease outbreak patterns. Infoveillance can detect disease outbreaks faster than traditional public health surveillance systems with minimal costs involved.

== Types ==
Infoveillance methods may be either passive or active. Traditional infoveillance data like search engine queries and website navigation behavior are considered passive, as they attempt to recognize trends automatically, without action (or often even awareness) on the part of the internet users who are generating the data for analysis. Active infoveillance occurs when users choose to respond to a survey, enter symptoms into a website or app, or otherwise participate directly in surveillance efforts by contributing additional information.

== Examples ==
=== Google Health Trends ===
Beginning in 2008, Google used aggregated search query data to detect influenza trends and compared the results to countries' official surveillance data with the goal of predicting the spread of the flu. In light of evidence that emerged in 2013 showing that Google Flu Trends sometimes substantially overestimated actual flu rates, researchers proposed a series of more advanced and better-performing approaches to flu modeling from Google search queries. Google Flu Trends stopped publishing reports in 2015.

Google also used aggregated search query data to detect dengue fever trends. Research has also cast doubt on the accuracy of some of these predictions. Google has continued this work to track and predict the COVID-19 pandemic, creating an open dataset on COVID-related search queries for use by researchers.

=== Flu Detector ===
Other flu prediction projects, including Flu Detector, have come and gone since the advent and removal of Google Flu Trends. Flu Detector was developed by Vasileios Lampos and other researchers at the University of Bristol. It was an application of machine learning that first used feature selection to automatically extract flu-related terms from Twitter content and then used those terms to compute a flu-score for several UK regions based on geolocated tweets. It also formed the basis for a proposed generalized scheme able to track other events.

=== Mood of the Nation ===
Mood of the Nation was also developed by Lampos' team. It performed mood analysis on tweets geo-located in various regions of the United Kingdom by computing on a daily basis scores for four types of emotion: anger, fear, joy and sadness.

=== Coronavirus Pandemic ===
The same approach was applied during the COVID-19 pandemic, for which a public data set of pandemic-related Twitter discourse was collected from January 2020 and released for infoveillance research.

== Privacy issues ==
The rise of infoveillance brings up questions about privacy. Privacy concerns are partially dependent on the level of analysis and how data are collected and managed. For instance, individuals may be re-identifiable from search query datasets that have not been properly de-identified. Privacy concerns are increased if data analysis is not done automatically and if search trajectories of individual users are examined.

== See also ==
- Participatory surveillance
- infodemiology
