= Roni Zeiger =

American physician

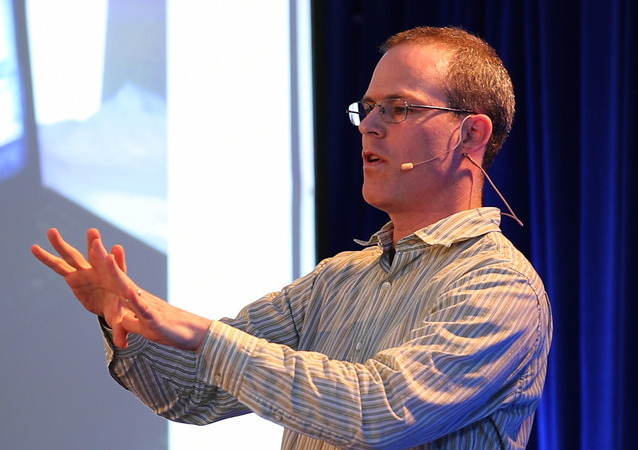
- Zeiger (2014)
- Education: Stanford Medical School
- Medical career
- Profession: Doctor

Roni F. Zeiger is an American physician and technologist. He is notable for his work as the Chief Health Strategist (2006–2012) at Google where he developed Google Health and Google Flu Trends. He is a co-founder of the Smart Patients project. In 2019, Zeiger announced he would be joining Facebook as the Head of Health Strategy.

== Education ==
Zeiger received his medical degree at Stanford University, including a master's degree in biomedical informatics and he did his residency at University of California, San Francisco (UCSF). He was an internist by training. He became interested in the application of technology in healthcare during his medical training, and noticing how difficult it was to find things in the medical records and how as time went on, the records got larger and more difficult to navigate.

== Work ==
Zeiger did primary care for some time. Zeiger has been profiled for partnering tech companies to health efforts.

=== Google ===
Zeiger was Chief Health Strategist (2006–2012) at Google where he worked on Google Health, symptom, anatomy, and health search on Google Search, and Google Flu Trends.

=== Smart Patients ===
With Gilles Frydman, founder of the Association of Cancer Online Resources, Zeiger co-founded the Smart Patients project. The project is a search engine and social media platform which connects clinical trial participants in cancer studies to each other for personal conversations.

== Bibliography ==
This is a select list of some of Zeiger's writings.

- Zeiger, R. F. (2005). "Toward continuous medical education". Journal of General Internal Medicine. 20 (1): 91–94. doi:10.1111/j.1525-1497.2004.30049.x. PMC 1490033. PMID 15693934. S2CID 21839149.
- Johnson, Christopher D.; Zeiger, Roni F.; Das, Amar K.; Goldstein, Mary K. (2006). "Task Analysis of Writing Hospital Admission Orders: Evidence of a Problem-Based Approach". AMIA Annual Symposium Proceedings. 2006: 389–393. PMC 1839659. PMID 17238369.
- Zeiger, Roni (2009-03-24). "The Last Mile Problem in Health". Huffington Post (Blog).
- Zeiger, Roni (2011-11-09). "Doctor's 'Worst Ever' Headache, and Learning the Patient Story". ABC News.
