= International Society for Infectious Diseases =

Non-profit health organization

- Abbreviation: ISID
- Established: 1986; 40 years ago
- Merger of: International Congress on Infectious Diseases; International Federation on Infectious and Parasitic Diseases
- Type: nonprofit
- Purpose: Prevent, investigate, and manage infectious disease outbreaks when they occur.
- Headquarters: 9 Babcock St, Unit 3, Brookline, Massachusetts, US
- Location: Massachusetts, US
- Region served: Worldwide
- Services: ProMED-mail
- Field: infectious diseases
- Official language: English
- President: Sally Roberts (New Zealand)
- Past-president: Paul Tambyah (Singapore)
- President-elect: Neelika Malavige (Sri Lanka)
- Key people: Jaffar Al-Tawfiq (Saudi Arabia); Gonzalo Bearman (United States); Patricio Acosta (Argentina); Robert Heyderman (United Kingdom); Helena Maltezou (Greece); Connie Walyaro (Kenya)
- Publication: The International Journal of Infectious Diseases
- Website: isid.org

The International Society for Infectious Diseases (ISID), established in 1986, is a nonprofit organization that monitors infectious diseases on a global scale. It also offers grants and fellowships, publishes a journal, and runs online learning platforms for sharing information on managing infectious diseases. It is based in Brookline, Massachusetts, US. The organization solicits donations from the general public, as well as governments, foundations, and the pharmaceutical industry.

== Work ==
This society recognizes the evolving nature of infectious diseases and their ability to cross regional and national boundaries. Through training and educational opportunities for healthcare professionals, this society works to overcome these obstacles to improve health on a global scale. ISID seeks to establish lasting partnerships with all manner of health-related disciplines to develop innovative methods for infectious disease control. With programs such as ProMED-mail, the International Congress on Infectious Diseases, the International Meeting on Emerging Diseases, and the International Journal of Infectious Diseases, ISID maintains an active presence in the scientific community.

The main goals of ISID are to:

- Increase the knowledge base of infectious diseases through research and enhance the professional development of individuals in this discipline.
- Extend and transfer technical expertise in infectious diseases and microbiology.
- Create and foster partnerships for the control and cost-effective management of infectious diseases around the world.

== History ==
ISID was created in 1986 by a merger between the International Congress on Infectious Diseases (ICID) and the International Federation on Infectious and Parasitic Diseases (IFIPD). The organization is headquartered in Brookline, Massachusetts, US.

=== The International Congress on Infectious Diseases ===
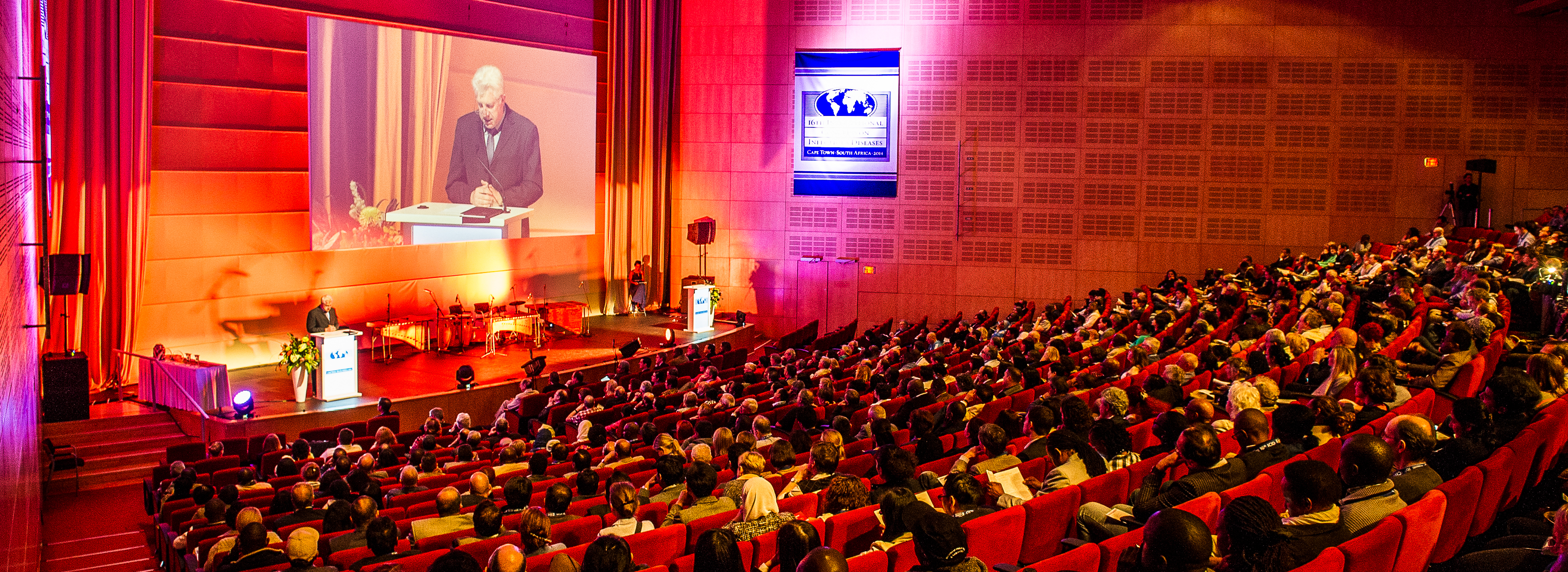
16th International Congress on Infectious Diseases held in Cape Town, South Africa

The International Congress on Infectious Diseases (ICID) was established in 1983 as a scientific assembly for the exchange of research and clinical information of infectious diseases. The ICID takes place every two years in a different region of the world to ensure the meeting is accessible to all persons interested in attending. The congress is committed to assisting colleagues from low resource countries and draws physicians and microbiologists from a range of backgrounds and countries. Approximately 2,500 clinicians, researchers, academics, public health practitioners, experts and leaders from over 100 countries attend these meetings. Attendees are updated concerning advances and challenges in the area of HIV, respiratory infections including pneumonia and tuberculosis, enteric infections, emerging infectious diseases, diagnostic advances, infection control, antimicrobial resistance, malaria, and neglected infectious diseases. Congress events include plenary speakers, symposia, meet-the-expert and poster sessions, all of which provide a platform to network, exchange research findings, and collaborate on problem-solving strategies in the area of global infectious diseases.

=== ProMED-mail ===
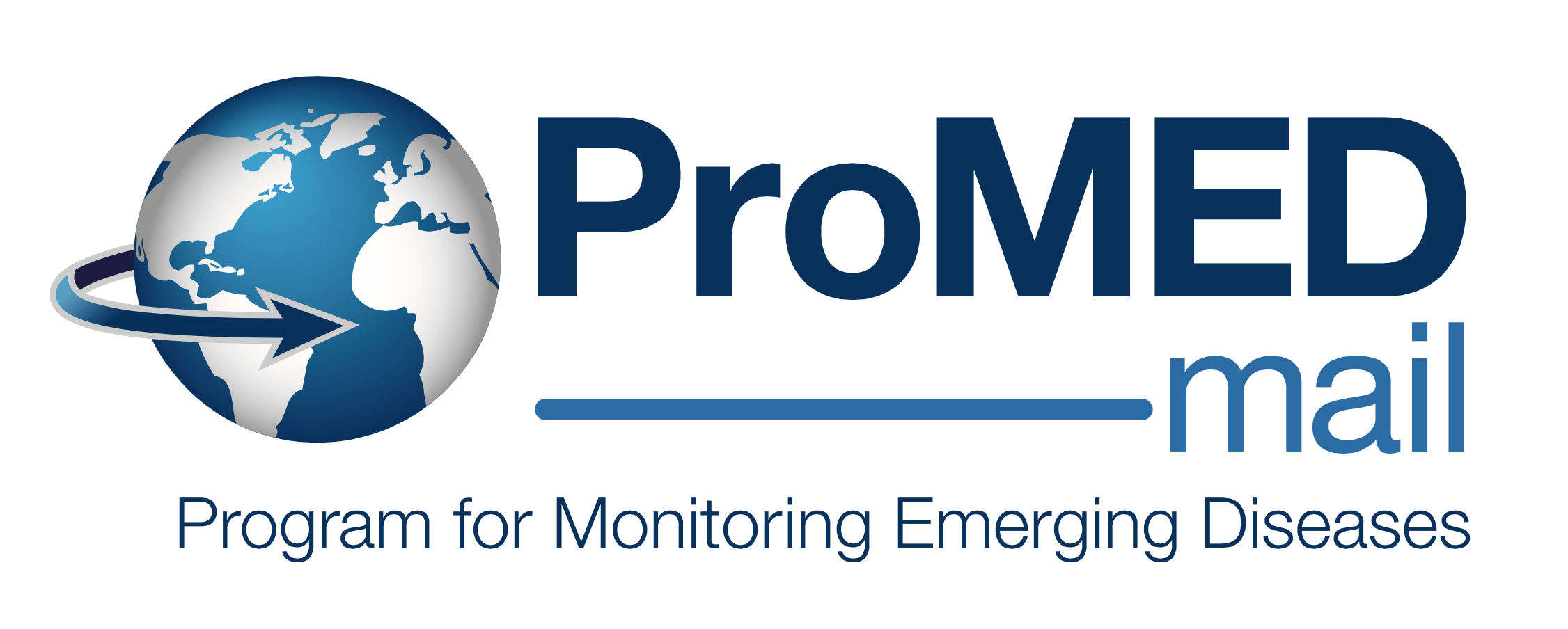

ProMED-mail (also referred to as ProMED for short) is one of the largest publicly available Internet-based disease-reporting platforms. Healthcare professionals can post information related to diseases of human, animal, environmental, and agricultural importance following a One Health model.

=== The International Journal of Infectious Diseases ===
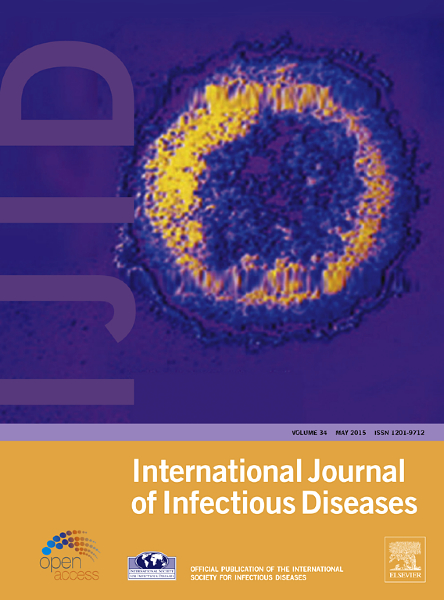

The International Journal of Infectious Diseases (IJID) is an open-access, peer-reviewed monthly journal that serves to convey information on the epidemiology, clinical evaluation, diagnosis, treatment, and control of infections. The journal's primary audience includes infectious disease researchers and clinicians throughout the world. The journal seeks to enhance the reader's understanding of the medical and cultural factors that affect infectious diseases in different regions, particularly those of under-resourced countries. This approach provides insight into outbreak characteristics with the opportunity to prevent morbidity and mortality associated with infectious diseases.

=== The International Meeting on Emerging Diseases ===
The International Meeting on Emerging Diseases (IMED) is held every two years and brings together leading scientists, clinicians, and policymakers to present their knowledge and breakthroughs in the area of emerging diseases. Meetings primarily focus on the discovery, detection, understanding, response, and preventative measures associated with outbreaks of emerging pathogens. With a central focus on the One Health model, participants recognize the link between human, animal, and environmental health as they relate to the emergence and spread of diseases.

=== A Guide to Infection Control in the Hospital ===
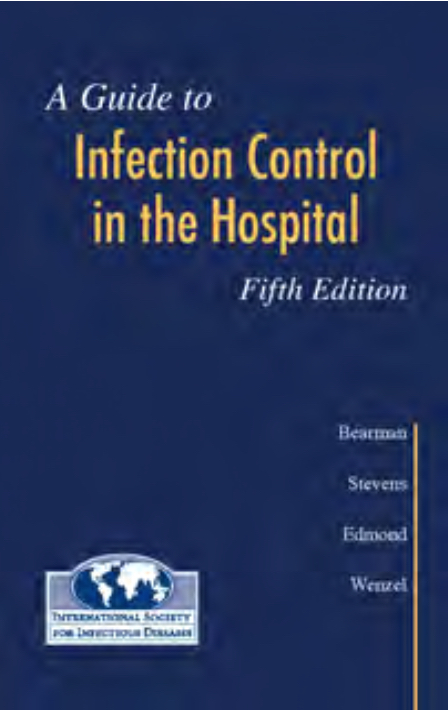
5th edition cover of A Guide to Infection Control in the Hospital

A Guide to Infection Control in the Hospital is a practical handbook for the management of nosocomial infections and the development of hospital-based infection control programs. This pocket-sized manual, in its 5th edition, contains 60 chapters that explain key principles and guidelines for reducing the rate of infections. With practical measures intended to improve quality of care, minimize risk, reduce costs, and ultimately save lives, the guide is an invaluable resource for all healthcare facilities. Past editions have been translated into Spanish, Polish, Croatian, Russian, and Chinese.

=== Fellowship and Grant Programs ===
ISID offers several grant programs and fellowship opportunities for healthcare professionals. These programs are designed to assist individuals from low- and middle-income countries while contributing to the general knowledge base of infectious diseases.

==== ISID Research Grants Program ====
The ISID Research Grants Program was established to fund pilot research projects and train young disease outbreak investigators from resource-limited countries. The goal of the program is to support and foster the professional development of individuals in the field of infectious disease research by helping them to acquire additional skills and data to advance their careers. As of 2015, ISID has awarded 166 grants to recipients from 43 countries including Argentina, Cameroon, India, Ghana, Kenya, South Africa, Malaysia, and Peru.

==== Swiss Society for Infectious Diseases/ISID Infectious Diseases Research Fellowship Program ====
ISID and the Swiss Society for Infectious Diseases (SSI) jointly sponsor the SSI/ISID Infectious Diseases Research Fellowship Program. The purpose of this Fellowship Program is to support infectious disease physicians and scientists from low- and middle-income countries through multidisciplinary clinical and laboratory training at select biomedical institutions in Switzerland. A financial stipend of up to 36,000 SF per year (approximately US$35,500) is given to Fellows to cover travel costs and living expenses. The program intends to award two fellowships each year.

==== ISID / European Society of Clinical Microbiology and Infectious Diseases Fellowship Program ====
The ISID and the European Society of Clinical Microbiology and Infectious Diseases (ESCMID) co-sponsor the ISID/ESCMID Fellowship Program, enabling two Fellows per year to perform multidisciplinary clinical and laboratory training abroad. This particular fellowship is intended for applicants from outside Europe.

== ISID governance ==
The society is governed by an international council, which is elected by the membership. The council is organized according to geographic region to ensure representation from all the areas of the world. The ISID membership also approves an executive committee and its officers. The executive committee is responsible for the activities of the society. The executive committee appoints an executive director who is responsible for the day-to-day operations of the society.
