= Mekong Basin Disease Surveillance =

Asian infectious disease surveillance and control consortium

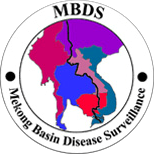
seal

The Mekong Basin Disease Surveillance (MBDS) consortium is a self-organised and sub-regional co-operation spearheaded by health ministries from member countries to collaborate on infectious disease surveillance and control. The co-operation focuses on cross-border co-operation at selected sites and has matured through several phases of work. PRO/MBDS is a component of the outbreak reporting system ProMED-mail.

== History ==
The Ministries of Health of Cambodia, China, Laos, Myanmar, Thailand and Vietnam signed the Memorandum of Understanding (MOU) in 2001 in Kunming, China, with the Regional Coordinating office agreed to be located in the Ministry of Public Health (MOPH), Thailand.

=== H1N1 Pandemic ===
MBDS officials surveyed generally rated the organization's response to the H1N1 pandemic favorably. The two factors that they listed as the most important in determining an effective pandemic response were national preparedness plans developed after exercises in 2006 as well as strong political leadership. Coordination within MBDS was rated as a less important factor, suggesting that the development of preparedness plans may have been more effective than the organizational structure itself.

== Structure ==
=== Executive Board ===
- Cambodia: Prof. Sann Chan Soeung (Deputy Director General, Ministry of Health)
- China: Dr. Wang Liying (Director, Ministry of Health)
- Lao PDR: Dr. Bounlay Phommasack (Deputy Director General, Ministry of Health)
- Myanmar: Prof. Saw Lwin (Deputy Director General, Ministry of Health)
- Thailand: Dr. Kumnuan Ungchusak (Senior Expert, Ministry of Public Health)
- Vietnam: Dr. Nguyen Hoang Long (Vice Director, Ministry of Health)

=== MBDS Coordinating Office ===
Dr. Moe Ko Oo MBDS Coordinator, c/o Ministry of Public Health

== Achievements ==
MBDS has applied epidemiology and GIS, initiated tabletop exercises (TTXs) on Pandemic Preparedness in country and regional levels in 2006 and 2007. It is prepared to conduct at least one outbreak investigation, TTX or drill at each cross-border site each year, seeking to conduct joint investigation of a zoonotic disease as a particular priority.

In May 2007, the extension of MOU was signed by the six MBDS health ministers in Geneva, for indefinite time period. With the increasing number of cross-border sites, MBDS developed a new 6-year action plan focusing on seven inter- related core strategies.

It piloted cross-border co-operation, with the exchange of regular disease information on a daily, weekly, monthly or quarterly basis, cross-border meetings, monitoring and evaluation, multi-sector engagement (especially immigration, local authorities), cross-border epidemiologic case history, cross-border medical care and clinical follow-up to nearby provincial areas. It has used 2-way ICT-based communications between local, provincial and central levels in routine surveillance reporting and outbreak investigation (examples include equipment and protocols for communications through internet, cell phone SMS messaging, satellite telephones, telephone hotline, email).

It has also trained field epidemiologist and health officials of Member Countries through treating FETP alumni as training staff for countries to establish new long-term and short-term epidemiology training programs, at the same time enhancing short-course training in each member country by supporting curriculum design and training or providing lecturers/expert. During 2006–2007, 110 workers were trained in either field epidemiology and disease surveillance, analytical techniques or social, political and economic aspects of border health.

An unprecedented joint avian influenza investigation was triggered when an infected Lao citizen was found in Thailand. Since then, Vietnam and Laos also carried out joint investigations for outbreaks of typhoid and malaria.

MBDS partners with Rockefeller Foundation (RF), Nuclear Threat Initiative (NTI), Google, RAND, World Health Organization (WHO), United Nations System Influenza Coordination (UNSIC), US Agency for International Development (USAID)/Kenan Institute, Asian Development Bank (ADB), Association of Southeast Asian Nations (ASEAN), Google, InSTEDD, ChangeFusion, and Opendream.
