= Google for Health =

Health-related product portfolio

Google Health
- Type: Subsidiary
- Industry: Health information technology
- Founded: May 20, 2008; 18 years ago
- Products: Google Care Studio; Health features in Google Search
- Owner: Google
- Website: health.google

Google for Health, formerly known as Google Health, is a health-and-wellbeing initiative (formerly a division) of Google. It began in 2008 as an attempt to create a repository of personal health information in order to connect doctors, hospitals and pharmacies directly. The Google Health project was discontinued in 2012, but the Google Health portfolio re-established in 2018 before being redescribed in 2022 as an "effort" rather than a distinct division.

As of 2024, Google Health describes a range of features across other Google products, as well as the Google Cloud Studio integration for third-party electronic health records, such as MEDITECH Expanse.

== History ==
Former Google Health beta logo

=== 2008–2012 ===
Google Health was the name given to a 2008–2012 version of a service, which allowed Google users to volunteer their health records—either manually or by logging into their accounts at partnered health services providers—into the Google Health system, thereby merging potentially separate health records into one centralized Google Health profile. Volunteered information could include "health conditions, medications, allergies, and lab results". Once entered, Google Health used the information to provide the user with a merged health record, information on conditions, and possible interactions between drugs, conditions, and allergies. Google Health's API was based on a subset of the Continuity of Care Record.

The original Google Health was under development from mid-2006, under ex-chief health strategist Roni Zeiger. In 2008, the service underwent a two-month pilot test with 1,600 patients of The Cleveland Clinic. Starting on May 20, 2008, Google Health was released to the general public as a service in beta test stage. On September 15, 2010, Google updated Google Health with a new look and feel.

On June 24, 2011, Google announced it was retiring Google Health on January 1, 2012; data was available for download through January 1, 2013. The reason Google gave for abandoning the project was the lack of widespread adoption. In 2012, Roni Zeiger left Google.

=== 2018–2021 ===
Google Health in 2018 was the name given to a team working within Google, rather than a service or application, following a similarly named web service in 2008–2012.

In 2018, during a process codenamed "Tuscany", teams across the company combined into the new Google Health group. This included artificial-intelligence research teams Google Brain and DeepMind, as well as health teams from Nest Labs, the connected-home company Google bought in 2014.

Starting in November 2018, David Feinberg was appointed lead. In 2019, it was announced they wanted more searchable medical records and to "improve the quality of health-focused search results across Google and YouTube". Google Health also appeared to focus on health-related artificial intelligence research, clinical tools, and partnerships for other healthcare tools and services.

Later in 2018, Google reorganized their healthcare efforts, and as a result DeepMind Health became part of Google Health. They began a non disclosed project called Project Nightingale, a partnership with Ascension, a large Catholic health care system in the United States. The project was headed by David Feinberg, hired in November 2018 and his oversight included Google Fit, health-oriented features in Google Search, G Suite for healthcare businesses, AI-based health research offerings, and Alphabet subsidiaries DeepMind Health, Verily, and Calico. At the 2019 HLTH health care conference, Feinberg announced Google Health is working on improvements with the search functions in electronic health records (EHR) and to improve health-related search results across their platforms.

In 2020, there were four areas of focus:

1. Consumer tools : included work on search and maps to surface authoritative information. This group was formally moved out of Google Health and parceled into the Search division and FitBit division in 2021.
2. Clinician tools : in partnerships with doctors and clinicians
3. Imaging and diagnostics
4. Research group

In 2021, the imaging, diagnostics and research groups appeared to be consolidated as the Health AI group.

Google Health reportedly struck up deals to work with large health systems such as Ascension and Stanford Medicine, but talks with other major health companies and organizations including CVS Health and the Gates Foundation had "fallen apart along the way".

In February 2020, Google Health had more than 500 employees. In August 2021, Google reorganized the health projects and teams. Google Health continues to operate today as a "company-wide effort" led by Google's Chief Health Officer, Karen DeSalvo.

In 2023, Google shared that "there is no 'Google Healthcare' division or platform within Google today". At the same time, there had been reports of a platform offering that non-company partners have referred to publicly as "Google Health". This is now known to refer to Google Care Studio.

==== Fitbit and consumer health ====
In November 2019, Google announced plans to acquire Fitbit, with the company adding that "Fitbit health and wellness data will not be used for Google ads." The European Data Protection Board voiced privacy concerns in February 2020 about mass aggregation of data. In August 2020, EU regulators announced plans for an anticompetition probe into the deal. The acquisition was completed in January 2021. Later in 2021, a portion of the consumer health efforts of Google Health were formally moved into the FitBit division.

A personal health record app allowing users to rate their health records and share them with others appeared to be under development and real world testing in 2021.

==== COVID-19 pandemic ====
"A quarter of Google Health's life has been spent during the coronavirus pandemic, and it's helped focus its search ambitions, partnerships with health officials, and collaboration across the company", chief health officer Karen DeSalvo said in August 2020. She described YouTube, Maps, Google Assistant, and Google search wanting to guide consumers on their healthcare experience, called the "Discovery to Action Pathway". This included searching for local testing sites, looking for doctors, and setting up an appointment.

In April 2020, Julie Black, Director of Product Management for Google Health, announced virtual care entries on Google Maps for medical businesses. Searches for "immediate care" would also show widely-available virtual care platforms like Live Health Online, AmWell and Doctor on Demand.

In August 2020, Google announced a partnership with and investment in AmWell, a telemedicine company. The two companies aim to use their technology capabilities for TeleHealthcare including artificial intelligence and collaboration tools. Google Cloud will also invest $100 million in Amwell.

===== Exposure Notifications System (ENS) =====
In 2020, Apple and Google announced changes to their operating systems that would enable exposure notification for users. Chief Health Officer Karen DeSalvo noted that privacy concerns had led to the approach using Bluetooth-based proximity signals rather than GPS location tracking. In the UK, an NHS-developed app saw some adoption resulting in 1.7M exposure notifications. However, as of 2022, adoption of apps using Apple and Google’s exposure notification system had never gone above single digits for most states in the U.S.

Other countries had elected not to use the Google framework has opted for location tracking. Instead, some had special laws previously created for the public health emergency, allowing government use of location tracking and transaction databases by government authorities. In South Korea, authorities using cellphone location data had identified 60,000 people near a mass-exposure event in Itaewon. Affected individuals were notified, with some asked to self-quarantine, resulting in only 246 cases from the exposure. Privacy advocates expressed concern over the use of location data in this way.

==== Google Health Studies ====
In late 2020, Google introduced a Google Health Studies app for Android phones, appearing to rival Apple’s ResearchKit and Research App. The first studies on the Health Studies app focus on respiratory illness like COVID-19. Google deployed federated learning in an effort to improve privacy and security in its Health Studies app.

The Google Health Studies app was introduced amidst news that a competing Apple Research app had inadvertently collected more health data than requested. The Apple study had unintentionally collected 30 days of additional data, which was not requested as part of the study. According to emails to study participants, extra data had reportedly been deleted and was never accessed by Apple.

==== Google Care Studio ====
In March 2023, the CEO of MEDITECH, an electronic health record company, referred to Google Health as a product with features including "search and summarization capabilities". Later that Month, Google Health and MEDITECH announced a partnership to integrate the Google Care Studio product into MEDITECH's latest EHR product, Expanse.

=== 2025: Google for Health ===
In 2025, branding for Google's health-related efforts changed to "Google for Health". Instead of maintaining a standalone health division, the company had earlier decided to integrate health initiatives more broadly across its overall business, such as Google Cloud, Search, AI, Fitbit, and others.

== Partnerships ==
Google Health's current partners include Apollo Hospitals, Aravind Eye Hospital, Ascension, CIDRZ, Mayo Clinic, Northwestern Medicine, Rajavithi Hospital, Sankara Nethralaya, and Stanford Medicine.

The original Google Health (2008–2012), like many other Google products, was free to use for consumers. Unlike other Google services, however, Health contained no advertising. Google did not reveal how it planned to make money with the service, but a Wall Street Journal article said that Google "hasn't ruled [advertising] out for the future". Google filed in 2007, U.S. Patent Application #20070282632, "Method and apparatus for serving advertisements in an electronic medical record system".

Google Health (from 2008 to 2012) imported medical and/or drug prescription information from the following partners: Allscripts, Anvita Health, The Beth Israel Deaconess Medical Center, Blue Cross Blue Shield of Massachusetts, The Cleveland Clinic, CVS Caremark, Drugs.com, Healthgrades, Longs Drugs, Medco Health Solutions, Quest Diagnostics, RxAmerica, and Walgreens. In January 2010, the Withings WiFi Body scale enables Google Health users to seamlessly update their weight and other data to their online profiles. Users whose health records reside with other providers had to either manually enter their data or pay to have a Google Health partner perform the service. MediConnect Global was one such partner; for a fee, they would retrieve a user's medical records from around the world and add them to his or her profile.

In 2009, in response to demand for added convenience, Google Health began establishing relationships with tele-health providers that will allow their users to sync the data shared during tele-health consultations with their online health records partnerships have been formed with the following companies: MDLiveCare and Hello Health.

== Privacy concerns ==
The original Google Health was an opt-in service, meaning it could only access medical information volunteered by individuals. It did not retrieve any part of a person's medical records without his or her explicit consent and action. However, it did encourage users to set up profiles for other individuals. According to its Terms of Service, Google Health is not considered a "covered entity" under the Health Insurance Portability and Accountability Act of 1996; thus, HIPAA privacy laws do not apply to it.

In a 2008 article covering the original Google Health's launch, the New York Times discussed privacy issues and said that "patients apparently did not shun the Google health records because of qualms that their personal health information might not be secure if held by a large technology company." Others contend that Google Health may be more private than the current "paper" health record system because of reduced human interaction.

=== DeepMind Health and NHS ===
In 2017, DeepMind, a Google-owned company, was found to have not complied with UK data protection laws, according to the UK Information Commissioner’s Office. The health unit of DeepMind had been formed in early 2016. DeepMind acquired a task management app called Hark developed by Dominic King and Lord Ara Darzi at Imperial College. Deepmind Health was also developing an app with the NHS Royal Free Hospital called Streams that helped monitor patients with acute kidney injury. The ICO said that patients were not notified correctly about how their data was being used. The DeepMind Health team noted the appointment of David Feinberg at Google in November 2018, and later officially joined Google Health in late 2019.

=== University of Chicago ===
In June 2019, University of Chicago, its medical center, and Google were sued in a potential class-action lawsuit about patient record sharing. A federal judge dismissed the patient data privacy lawsuit on September 4, 2020. The class action suit had been filed by plaintiff Matt Dinerstein and represented by attorney Jay Edelson.

The university noted that class action attorney Edelson had a potential conflict of interest, as an investor in a competing company, Quant HC. According to a legal motion filed in 2019, Edelson and his law partners allegedly "funded, organized, and served as officers and directors of" Quant HC, a company founded by Edelson’s spouse, a physician at University of Chicago. Quant HC, produced medical software called ECART, and received $600,000 of initial investment from Edelson and his wife from its founding in 2012.

=== Ascension Health ===
In 2018, Project Nightingale started the partnership with Ascension, one of the largest United States health care systems. Ascension health system and Google described the partnership including infrastructure modernization, transitioning to productivity and collaboration tools, and exploring artificial intelligence / machine learning applications and tools for doctors and nurses.

In November 2019, Google engineers were reported to have had access to medical records held by Ascension as they were building products and as a result, the US government opened up an investigation on the partnership. From December 2019 to March 2020, a group of U.S. Senators asked for more information about the project, and how sensitive health information was protected.

Legal observers, however, had noted that there had probably not actually been any HIPAA federal privacy law violations, citing a business associate agreement between Google and Ascension in line with what HIPAA allowed. Other health data experts commented that companies such as IQVIA, UnitedHealth Optum Labs, and Symphony Health, IBM Watson Health (Truven Health) "reap the profits of selling the healthcare data while the people from whom it's collected have no control over how it's used. Nor do they get any compensation for it." For example, IQVIA, a large pharmaceutical research and marketing conglomerate noted that they have data on over 600 million patients in their public 10-K financial filings.

Other media coverage noted that while Google had done nothing illegal, questions remained on what other uses Google intended. Google executive Tariq Shaukat wrote in an official statement that the data would be used in extending tools to doctors and nurses to improve care, writing: "We aim to provide tools that Ascension could use to support improvements in clinical quality and patient safety." The official post was later amended to clarify that Ascension patient data would not be combined with Google consumer data, stating "In accordance with HIPAA and the BAA we sign with our customers, patient data cannot be used for any other purpose than for provisioning the tools specific to the customer."

=== Comparison to Facebook hospital data projects ===
The stated commitment by Google to not combine data stood in contrast to the health records activities by Facebook.

While Google noted they would not combine health data with consumer data, Facebook had reportedly sought to combine hashed electronic health record data with consumer data. The secretive Facebook "Building 8" project, led by cardiologist Freddy Abnousi, sought to "combine what a health system knows about its patients (such as: person has heart disease, is age 50, takes 2 medications and made 3 trips to the hospital this year) with what Facebook knows (such as: user is age 50, married with 3 kids, English isn't a primary language, actively engages with the community by sending a lot of messages)."

=== Fitbit acquisition and the European Commission ===
In August 2020, as Google began acquisition of FitBit, the European Commission began investigating Google's potential uses of data collected from Fitbit's health tracking hardware. The Commission expressed concerns about competition, the effects of combining data from FitBit and Google in the digital healthcare sector, and potential effects of interoperability of rivals' wearables with Google's Android operating system for smartphones.

== Competitors and related companies ==
Google's parent company Alphabet, Inc. has also been active in the healthcare industry with the companies Verily, Calico, and DeepMind. In July 2020, sister company Verily was described as acting "largely independent of one another", while Verily chief executive officer Andrew Conrad reportedly wanted to end the "rivalry" between the two companies and collaborate more closely.

On December 7, 2011, MediConnect Global announced a similar capability that allows displaced Google Health users to transfer their personal health records to a MyMediConnect account.

Google Health was a personal health record (PHR) service with numerous competitors, including other proprietary PHR systems and open-source such as Microsoft's HealthVault, Dossia, and the open-source Indivo project.

In the United States hospital market for electronic health records (EHR) in 2018, Epic, Cerner, MEDITECH, and CSPI (Evident Thrive) had the top market share at 28%, 26%, 9%, and 6%. For large hospitals with over 500 beds, Epic and Cerner had over 85% market share in 2019.

=== Microsoft ===
On July 18, 2011, Microsoft released a tool that lets Google Health customers transfer their personal health information to a web-based Microsoft HealthVault account. HealthVault had partnered with American Heart Association, Johnson & Johnson, and Allscripts. In November 2019, Microsoft HealthVault was shut down and it was suggested users migrate their records to Get Real Health and FollowMyHealth.
