= Neelika Malavige =

Sri Lankan professor, researcher and scientist

- Born: Neelika Malavige
- Education: University of Colombo; University of Oxford
- Spouse: Lasantha Malavige
- Awards: Third World Academy Science (2012); Zonta Award (2014)
- Scientific career
- Workplaces: University of Sri Jayewardenepura

Gathsaurie Neelika Malavige is a Sri Lankan academic, university professor, researcher and scientist. She is the head as well as the professor at the Department of Immunology and Molecular Sciences of the Sri Jayawardenepura University, Faculty of Medical Sciences since 2020. She is a visiting lecturer at University of Oxford since 2008. She is married to Lasantha Malavige who is regarded as Sri Lanka's first sexologist.

== Career ==
Neelika graduated with MBBS from the University of Colombo in 2000. She moved to UK and pursued her doctoral studies at the MRC Weatherall Institute of Molecular Medicine at the University of Oxford where she obtained the Doctorate of Philosophy in 2008. She pursued her doctor studies at the University of Oxford through a Commonwealth Scholarship scheme in 2004. After completing her higher studies in UK, she returned to Sri Lanka and pursued her academic career as a visiting lecturer in 2008.

She obtained the Membership of the Royal Colleges of Physicians of the United Kingdom (UK) in 2005. She was also elected as the Fellow of the Royal Colleges of Physicians of the United Kingdom and also received the Fellowship of the Royal Colleges of Pathologists of the United Kingdom in 2015.

She also serves as the director of Centre for Dengue Research at University of Sri Jayawardenepura University from 2012. She served as a senior lecturer at the Department of Microbiology from 2008 to 2013. She also went onto serve as the head of Department of Microbiology on a three-year stint from 2012 to 2015. She had also served as a professor in Department of Microbiology from 2013 to 2020.

She has been a member in several prominent organisations such as British Society of Immunology, Sri Lanka College of Physicians, Sri Lanka Medical Association, European Academy of Alergology and Clinical Immunology, International Society of Infectious Diseases and American Society of Tropical and Hygiene. She is also a key member of Oxford University research team conducting COVID-19 anti-body tests. In March 2020, she joined the executive committee of the International Society for Infectious Diseases (ISID). Prior to joining the executive committee, she served as the council member of ISID from 2012 up until 2020.

She is also currently engaged in research regarding the COVID-19 pandemic in Sri Lanka giving updates and statements about the COVID situation in Sri Lanka from time to time. She is also actively involved in identification and analysis of detecting new variants and strains of COVID-19. In June 2021, she resigned from the independent vaccine advisory expert committee of the National Medicinal Regulatory Authority for personal reasons and workload.

== Awards ==
She claimed the Joseph Nalliah Arumugam Memorial Award at the final MBBS in 2000. In 2011, she received the prestigious S. C. Paul Oration and gold medal from Sri Lanka Medical Association. She also received the Third World Academy Science (TWAS) young scientist award in 2012. She also notably claimed the Zonta award for her remarkable achievements in the field of medicine in 2014. She was recognized as the best researcher at the University of Sri Jayawardenepura in 2015. She received the Inspirational Woman Award for her research work on COVID-19 at the Top 50 Professional and Career Woman Awards in 2020.
