= Google Insights for Search =

Service by Google

Google Insights for Search was a service by Google similar to Google Trends, providing insights into the search terms people use in the Google search engine. Unlike Google Trends, Google Insights for Search provides a visual representation of regional interest on a country's map. It displays top searches and rising searches that may help with keyword research. Results can be narrowed down with categories that are displayed for each search terms.

Term order is important in searches, in that different results will be found if keywords are placed in a different order.

On September 27, 2012, Google Insights for Search was closed and merged into Google Trends again.

== See also ==
- Google Search Console
- Google Trends
- List of Google products
