= Influenzanet =

System monitoring influenza-like symptoms

Influenzanet is a syndromic surveillance system that monitors the activity of influenza-like illness (ILI) with the help of volunteers via the Internet. This innovative surveillance system is based on the voluntary online participation of the population who, on a weekly basis, respond to an internet questionnaire about flu symptoms.

During the winter 2003/2004 season, the Netherlands and Belgium launched the first Influenzanet - De Grote Griepmeting - which attracted over 30,000 participants in the first year. The Dutch Great Influenza Survey has been carried out yearly since then. It was implemented in Portugal for the 2005/2006 season; this was followed by the Italians with Influweb in 2008, and then by the French version called GrippeNet in 2012.

With the threat of a new pandemic influenza, three other countries joined this project in 2009, with the implementation of Gripenet Brazile, in Brasil; Reporta in Mexico; and the Flusurvey in the United Kingdom. In Australia, a comparable project called Flutracking started in 2006. "Flutrackers" complete a 10 - 15 second online survey about flu-like symptoms. In 2019 Flutracking had over 50,000 weekly participants. Since 2018 Flutracking has expanded into New Zealand, Hong Kong and Argentina.

== How it works ==
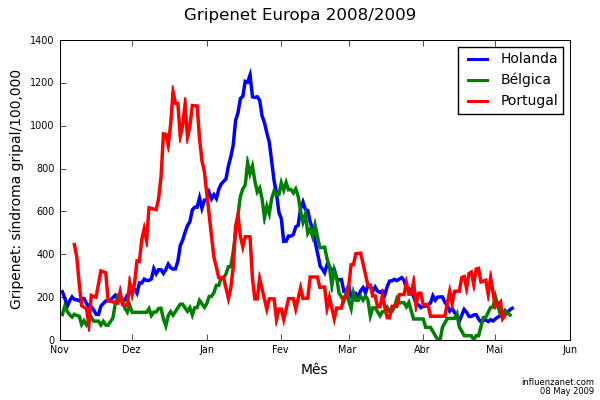
ILI Incidence curves generated by the Influenzanet, in the 2008-2009 flu season, in Portugal, The Netherlands and Belgium

Any resident of the participating countries can register by completing an online application form containing various medical, geographic, and behavioural questions. Every week during the flu season, participants are asked to select from a list of symptoms the ones they have experienced since their previous visit to the website. Participation is stimulated by email newsletters, online educational materials, competitions and presentations, and other educational activities.

A case of ILI is defined based on a set of reported symptoms: acute onset of fever of >=38 °C, plus muscle pain, plus one of the following: cough, sore throat, and/or chest pain. The daily incidence of ILI is determined by the number of participants with an onset.

The results of the influenzanet closely matches the official European Influenza Surveillance Scheme data.
