= Journal of Medical Internet Research =

- Discipline: Medicine, eHealth
- Language: English
- Edited by: Gunther Eysenbach, Rita Kukafka

Publication details
- History: 1999–present
- Publisher: JMIR Publications
- Frequency: Upon acceptance (issues aggregated monthly)
- Open access: Yes
- License: Creative Commons Attribution 2.0
- Impact factor: 7.08 (2025)

Standard abbreviations
- ISO 4: J. Med. Internet Res.

Indexing
- ISSN: 1438-8871
- LCCN: 00252482
- OCLC no.: 42705591

Links
- Journal homepage

The Journal of Medical Internet Research is a peer-reviewed open-access medical journal established in 1999 covering eHealth and "healthcare in the Internet age". The editors-in-chief are Gunther Eysenbach and Rita Kukafka. The publisher is JMIR Publications.

== Publisher ==
The journal is published by JMIR Publications, which was a cofounder of the Open Access Scholarly Publishers Association and is known for other journal titles as well, which mostly focus on specific subtopics within eHealth, such as mHealth (JMIR mHealth and uHealth), serious games (JMIR Serious Games), mental health (JMIR Mental Health), and cancer (JMIR Cancer). JMIR Publications is also notable for being one of the fastest-growing companies in Canada in 2019.

== Controversy ==
JMIR Publications has faced criticism for initially using the same editorial board of its main journal for its sister journals and for offering a fast-track review pathway for a surcharge. On academic forums and social media, many have questioned the academic ethics of JMIR Publications, such as fraudulent fast track fee practices and forced transfers, with "violent rejections" if not agreed upon. Editor-in-chief Gunther Eysenbach claimed that the spin-off journals would eventually have their own boards and that the fast-track option does not affect the quality or integrity of its peer-review processes.

== Impact ==
According to the Journal Citation Reports, the journal has a 2021 impact factor of 7.08. According to a survey among 398 health informatics experts in 2015, the journal was ranked as a top tier journal in the field of health informatics.

== Other journals from the publisher ==
Among the 32 JMIR Publications journals, 5 journals, in addition to J Med Internet Res, have been ranked in the Journal Citation Reports.

These include:

- JMIR Public Health and Surveillance (2026 impact factor of 4.4)
- JMIR Mental Health (2026 impact factor of 7.4)
- JMIR mHealth and uHealth (2026 impact factor of 6.3)
- JMIR Serious Games (2026 impact factor of 4.7)
- JMIR Medical Informatics (2026 impact factor of 5.0)

In June 2023, JMIR Publications announced that 14 of their 34 journals had received Impact Factors, many ranked in the top quartile (Q1) of their respective disciplines.

JMIR Publications also publishes the JMIRx series of "superjournals", described as a form of Overlay journal, which conduct peer-review on top of entire preprint servers and offers publication of the version-of-record. JMIR Publications created superjournals for Preprint servers like MedRxiv (JMIRx Med) and BioRxiv (JMIRx-Bio). The novel format was announced by JMIR Publications publisher Gunther Eysenbach in 2019 in the 20th anniversary special issue of the publisher. In the same issue, the journal also published a peer-reviewed preprint by Elon Musk and Neuralink about a brain-implantable neurochip (Neuralink), with solicited comments from experts, to demonstrate to concept of a superjournal.

JMIRx Med (which sits on top of medrxiv), was created in 2020 and is described as the first medical overlay journal in the world, according to a review on overlay journals in 2022. In 2022, JMIR Publications announced that JMIRx Med was accepted as the first overlay journal to be indexed in PubMed.
