= Global Public Health Intelligence Network =

Electronic public health early warning system

The Global Public Health Intelligence Network (GPHIN) is an electronic public health early warning system developed by Canada's Public Health Agency, and is part of the World Health Organization's (WHO) Global Outbreak Alert and Response Network (GOARN). This system monitors internet media, such as news wires and websites, in nine languages in order to help detect and report potential disease or other health threats around the world. The system has been credited with detecting early signs of the 2009 swine flu pandemic in Mexico, Zika in West Africa, H5N1 in Iran, MERS and Ebola.

The system came to greater public awareness after it was revealed that Canada's Federal Government effectively shut it down in May 2019, ultimately preventing the system from providing an early warning of COVID-19. In August 2020, the system began issuing alerts again.

== History ==
Ronald St. John, then a government epidemiologist, created GPHIN in 1994 as a way to improve Canada's intelligence surrounding outbreaks. Growing in parallel with ProMED-mail, GPHIN was Canada's major contribution to the World Health Organization (WHO), which at one point credited the system with supplying 20 per cent of its "epidemiological intelligence" and described the system as "the foundation" of a global pandemic early-warning system.

After the 2003 SARS outbreak, the system became central to Canada's pandemic preparedness. The system, which eventually fell under the Centre for Emergency Preparedness and Response in the PHAC, detected early signs of the 2009 swine flu pandemic in Mexico, Zika in West Africa, H5N1 in Iran, MERS and Ebola.

=== 2019–2020 silence ===
A July 2020 investigation by The Globe and Mail revealed that Canada's Federal Government effectively shutdown GPHIN in May 2019, ultimately preventing the system from providing an early warning of COVID-19. After the government directed for a more domestic focus, the Public Health Agency of Canada (PHAC) assigned employees to different tasks in the department. The shutdown was gradual: in 2009, there were 877 alerts; 198 in 2013; and only 21 in 2018. The final alert came on May 24, 2019. In August 2020, more than 400 days after going silent, the system began issuing alerts again.

In early 2020 before COVID-19 was declared a pandemic, scientists at PHAC "were told to focus on official information coming out of China, rather than unofficial intelligence. Some said they struggled to convey urgent information up the chain of command." Internal PHAC emails obtained by The Globe indicate that Sally Thornton, vice-president of the Health Security Infrastructure Branch, and Jim Harris, director-general of the Centre for Emergency Preparedness and Response, oversaw the decision that curtailed alerts.

The [Public Health Agency of Canada] was not adequately prepared to respond to a pandemic, and it did not address long-standing health surveillance information issues prior to the pandemic to support its readiness. ... We will never be able to tell Canadians what would have happened if the preparedness issues had been better addressed before the pandemic hit. Perhaps the government's pandemic response would have been different.

— Auditor General of Canada Karen Hogan, March 2021

Following The Globe and Mail's report, Canada's Auditor-General began an investigation into why the program was curtailed. Released in March 2021, the Auditor-General's report described PHAC as ill-prepared for the pandemic. The report focused primarily on the silencing of GPHIN and the inaccurate risk assessments that replaced it. In September 2020, Canada's Health Minister Patty Hajdu ordered an independent federal review to look into both the shutdown of the system along with allegations that some scientist's voices were marginalized. Former national security adviser Margaret Bloodworth; former deputy chief public health officer Paul Gully; and Mylaine Breton, Canada Research Chair in Clinical Governance on Primary Health Care led Hajdu's review. Canada's Chief Public Health Officer Theresa Tam announced her support of the review, while Prime Minister Justin Trudeau issued blame to funding cuts made prior to 2015 by the previous Conservative government under Stephen Harper.

== Management ==
PHAC's Centre for Emergency Preparedness and Response (CEPR) manages GPHIN. In October 2020, Jim Harris was director-general CEPR.

In September 2020 Brigitte Diogo replaced Sally Thornton as vice-president of the Health Security Infrastructure Branch, the bureaucratic division overseeing GPHIN among other operations. A week later, President Tina Namiesniowski announced her resignation, with Trudeau nominating Iain Stewart as her successor.
