= ProMED-mail =

Emerging diseases and outbreak reporting system

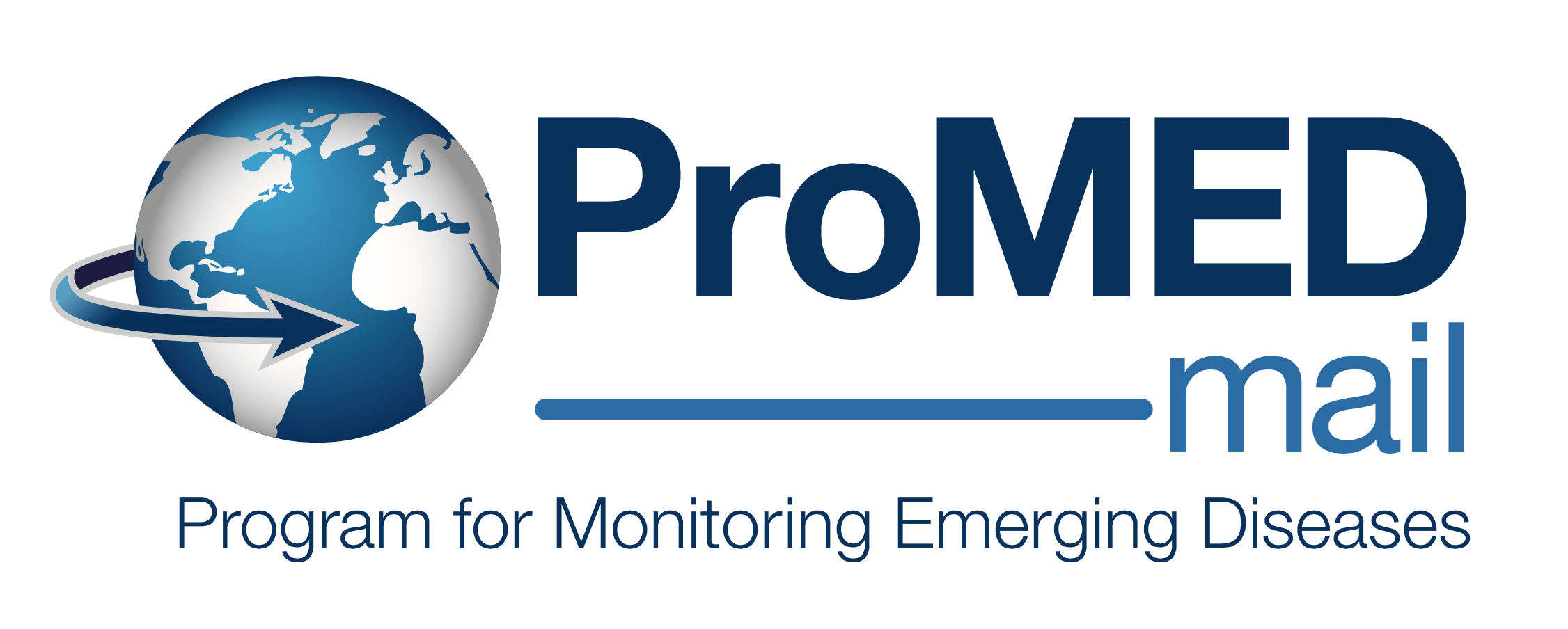
- Developer: International Society for Infectious Diseases
- Initial release: 1994
- Marketing target: Public health
- Official website: www.promedmail.org

Program for Monitoring Emerging Diseases (also known as ProMED-mail, abbreviated ProMED) is among the largest publicly available emerging diseases and outbreak reporting systems in the world. The purpose of ProMED is to promote communication amongst the international infectious disease community, including scientists, physicians, veterinarians, epidemiologists, public health professionals, and others interested in infectious diseases on a global scale. Founded in 1994, ProMED has pioneered the concept of electronic, Internet-based emerging disease and outbreak detection reporting. In 1999, ProMED became a program of the International Society for Infectious Diseases. As of 2016, ProMED has more than 75,000 subscribers in over 185 countries. With an average of 13 posts per day, ProMED provides users with up-to-date information concerning infectious disease outbreaks on a global scale.

ProMED's guiding principles include:

- Transparency and a commitment to the unfettered flow of outbreak information
- Freedom from political constraints
- Availability to all without cost
- Commitment to One Health
- Service to the global health community

One of the essential global health priorities is the timely recognition and reporting of emerging and re-emerging infectious diseases. Early recognition can enable coordinated and rapid responses to an outbreak, preventing catastrophic morbidity and mortality. Additionally, early detection can alleviate grave economic hardship brought upon by pandemics and emerging diseases. Burgeoning globalization of commerce, finance, manufacturing, and services has fostered ever-increasing movement of people, animals, plants, food, and animal feed. Other contributing factors to the risk of new pathogens emerging and known pathogens re-emerging include climate change, urbanization, land use changes, and political instability. Outbreaks that begin in the most remote parts of the world now spread swiftly to urban centres in countries far away. The epidemiological data in ProMED posts has been used to estimate mortality rates and demographic parameters for specific diseases.

The severe acute respiratory syndrome (SARS) outbreak in 2003 and the Middle East respiratory syndrome (MERS) outbreak in 2012 demonstrated the importance of early identification for emerging disease occurrences. The initial outbreak reports in both events were posted by astute clinicians. The use of non-traditional information sources can provide prompt information to the international community on emerging infectious disease problems that have yet to be officially reported. The early dissemination of information may lead to rapid official confirmation of ongoing outbreaks.

The Epicore programme, launched in March 2016 by various organizations including the patrons of ProMED-mail, makes use of volunteers throughout the world to find and report outbreaks using non-traditional methods.

== History ==
Under the auspices of the Federation of American Scientists, ProMED-mail was founded in 1994 by Dr. Stephen Morse, then of Rockefeller University, Dr. Barbara Rosenberg of the State University of New York at Purchase, and Dr. Jack Woodall, then of the New York State Department of Health. Originally envisioned as a direct scientist-to-scientist network, ProMED rapidly grew into a prototype outbreak reporting and discussion list, especially after the 1995 Ebola outbreak. The idea of a global network was first proposed by Donald A. Henderson in 1989.

ProMED played a crucial role in identifying the SARS outbreak early in 2003. An astute physician in Silver Spring, Maryland, Stephen O. Cunnion, MD, PhD, MPH, submitted the first report to the database for this emerging outbreak, allowing the ProMED community to track the outbreak nearly two months in advance of the worldwide alert. The email read: "Have you heard of an epidemic in Guangzhou? An acquaintance of mine . . . reports that the hospitals there have been closed and people are dying." It was one month later before the Chinese government officially acknowledged the outbreak.

In 2012, the users of ProMED were again some of the first to identify the outbreak of MERS. A physician was responsible for identifying the outbreak and reporting the event to the ProMED community, which was posted online. Eight days after the initial report, the Saudi Health Ministry announced the diagnosis of a new form of coronavirus.

The ProMED-mail system grew from 1994 in parallel with Public Health Agency of Canada's similar Global Public Health Intelligence Network (GPHIN),.

At 23:59 on 30 December 2019, ProMED-mail received its first communication about the COVID-19 outbreak.

On 3 August 2023, 21 out of the 38 paid moderators and editors for the service went on strike, citing lack of support from ISID.

== Disease surveillance and reporting ==
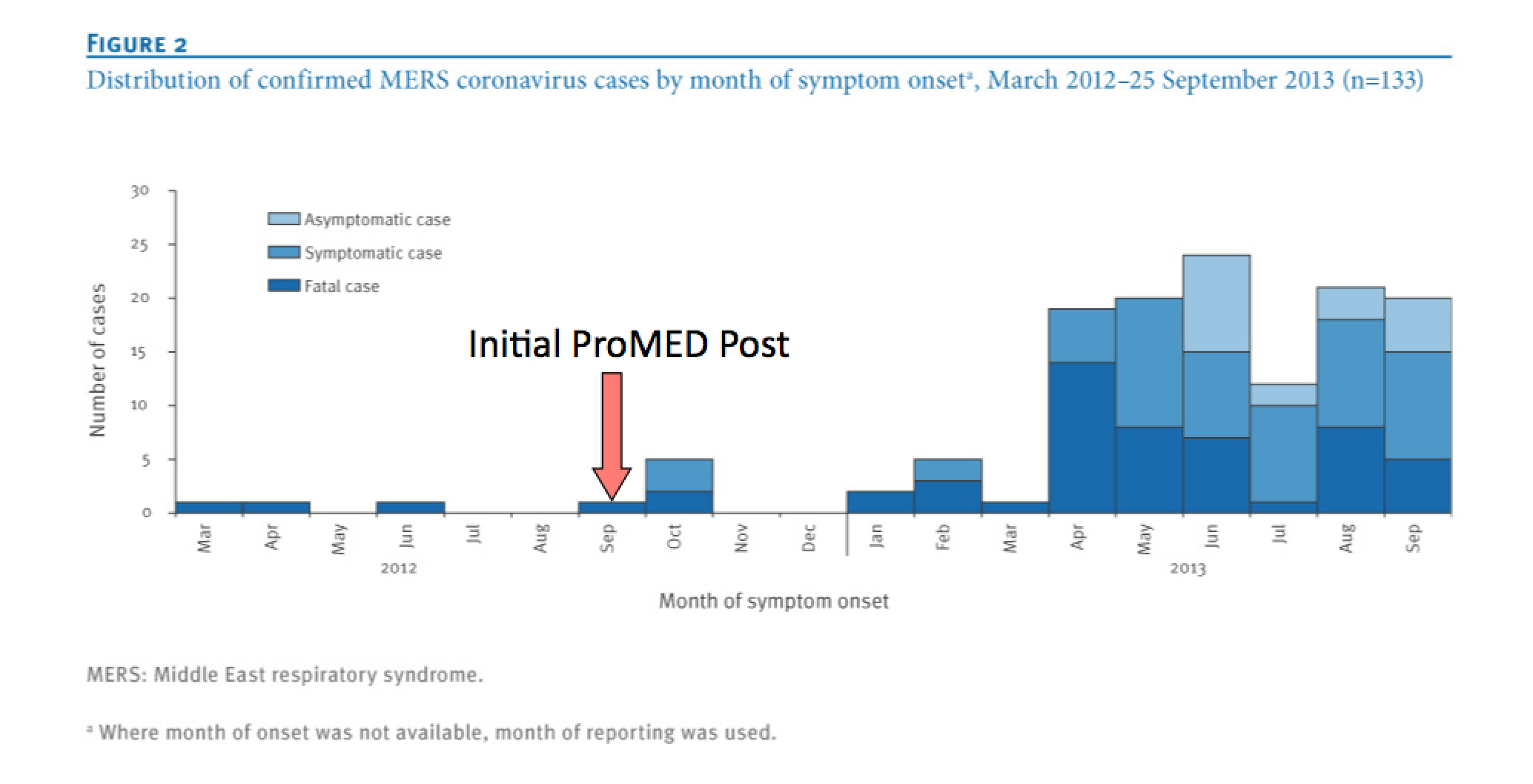
MERS case distribution graphic from Eurosurveillance 2013 Volume 18, Issue 39, Article 3, annotated by ProMED

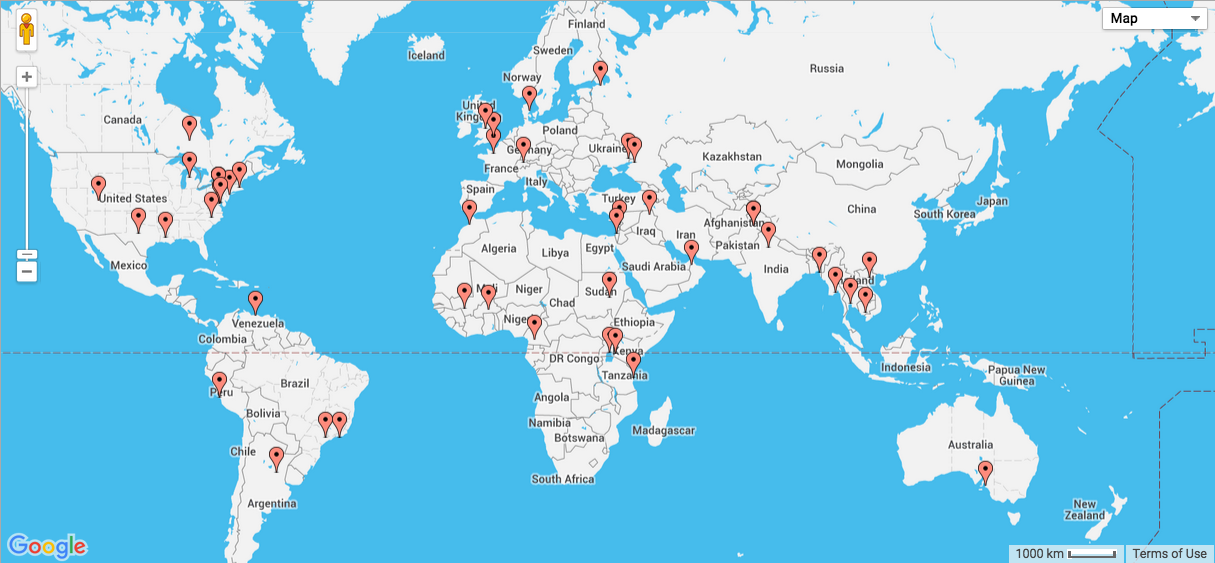
Locations of the 45 ProMED moderators who review and provide commentary on reports published to the ProMED-mail database.

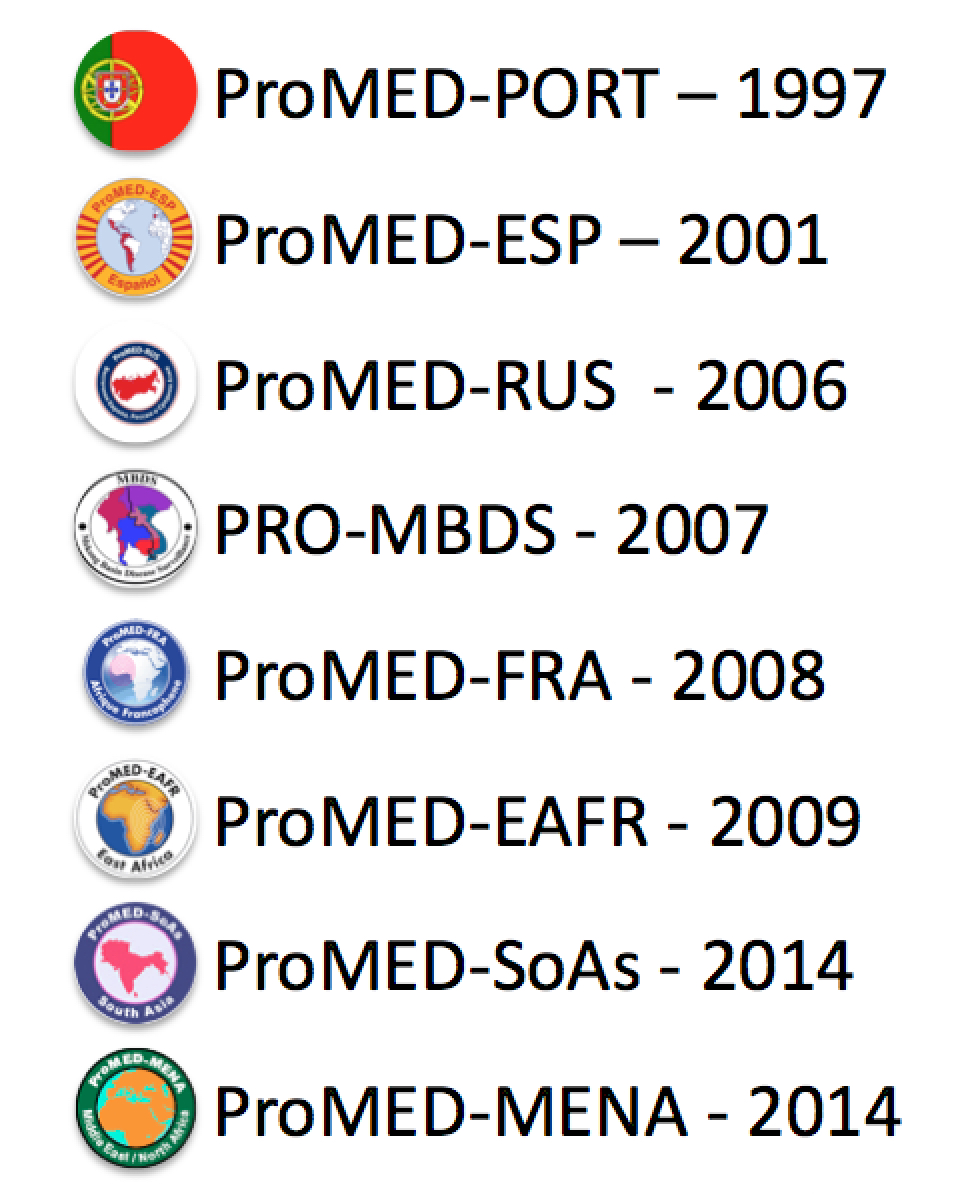
Language regions of ProMED-mail and year they were added to the database.

The importance of using unofficial sources of information for public health surveillance has become increasingly recognized. Sometimes referred to as "event-based surveillance" or "epidemic intelligence," informal disease reporting services, pioneered by ProMED, have become a crucial component of the overall global infectious disease surveillance picture. According to the WHO Epidemic & Pandemic Alert & Response, more than 60% of the initial outbreak reports come from informal sources, including ProMED-mail.

ProMED-mail publishes reports to the website ProMEDmail.org in addition to sending e-mails to service subscribers. There is no cost for subscription to the reporting network. ProMED encourages subscribers to contribute data, respond to requests for information, and collaborate in outbreak investigations and prevention efforts.

Posts are published on a real-time basis. Reports detail infectious disease outbreaks with geotags and links to related media articles and other ProMED posts. Each report is screened and edited by a staff of expert moderators, ensuring the validity of the published information. There are 45 moderators for ProMED stationed throughout the world. Moderators review reports submitted within their region of oversight, drawing on their knowledge of the region and infrastructure to provide accurate descriptions of the outbreak event.

As ProMED-mail is an independent program of the non-government, nonprofit International Society for Infectious Diseases, this ensures the avoidance of delay or suppression of disease reporting by governments for bureaucratic or strategic reasons. To provide access to a global audience, versions of ProMED are available in several languages and cover different regions, including ProMED-ESP (Spanish), ProMED-PORT (Portuguese), ProMED-RUS (Russian), ProMED-FRA (French), ProMED-MENA (Middle East and North Africa), ProMED-SoAs (South Asia and Arabic Summaries), as well as English-language versions ProMED-MBDS (Mekong Basin region of Southeast Asia) and ProMED-EAFR (Africa).

== One Health ==
One Health is the principle that human, animal, and environmental health are inextricably linked and should no longer be researched and learned in a siloed manner. ProMED embodied this concept in the sphere of infectious disease reporting since its inception. It is estimated that 70% of emerging human diseases originate in other animal species – termed zoonotic diseases. As diseases in both animal and agriculture species have health implications for humans, ProMED includes posts on emerging animal diseases and diseases related to agriculturally important plants due to their impact on human survival.

== Collaborations ==
ProMED-mail and HealthMap were awarded a grant from Google.org's Predict and Prevent initiative in October 2008. This collaboration combined ProMED-mail's global network of human, animal, and ecosystem health specialists with HealthMap's digital detection efforts.
