= Gunther Eysenbach =

Canadian healthcare researcher

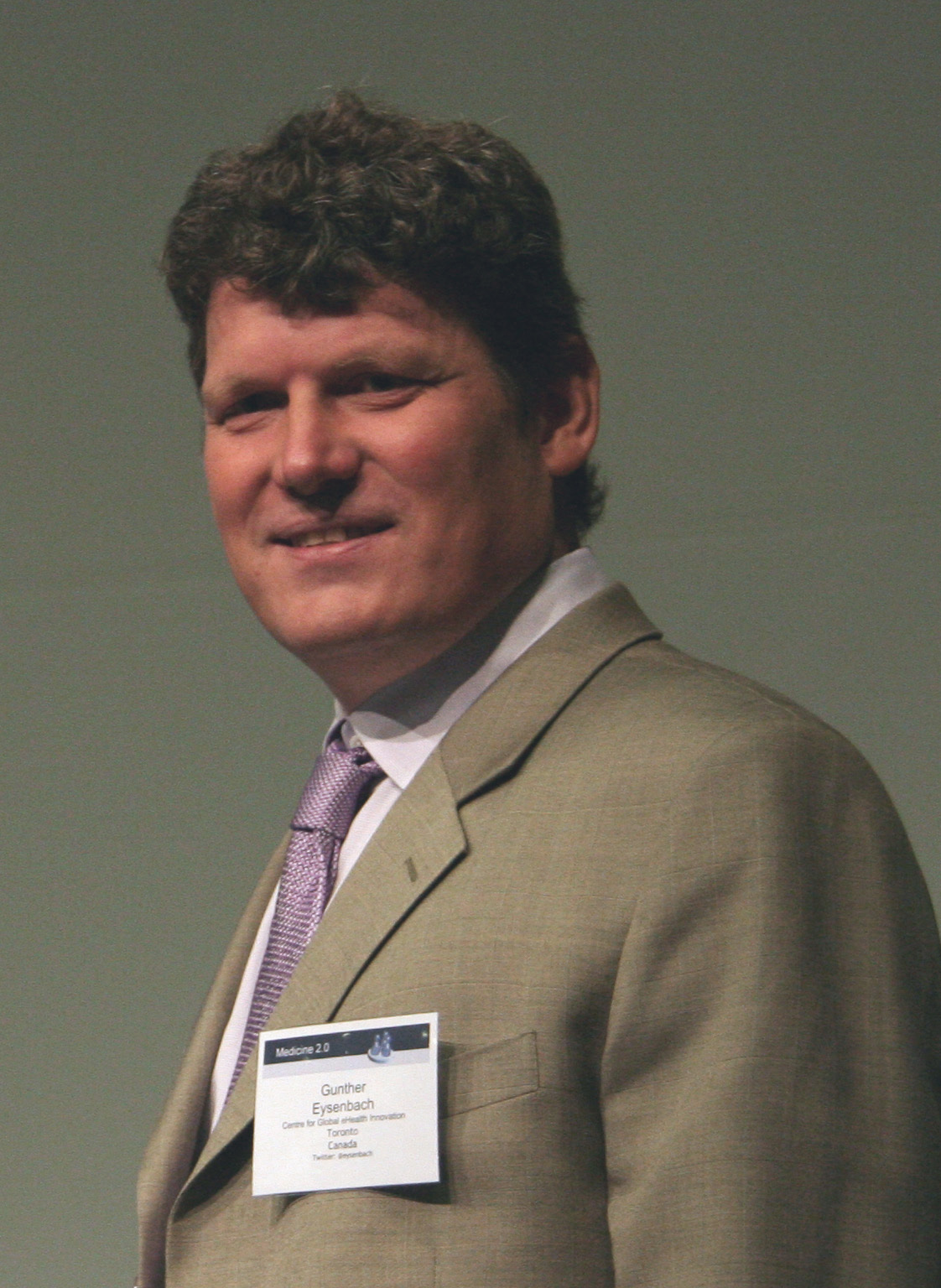
- Eysenbach in 2009
- Born: 22 March 1967 (age 59); West Berlin, West Germany
- Known for: eHealth, health informatics infodemiology
- Awards: Public Knowledge Project Community Contribution Award; Ferguson Distinguished Achievement Awards
- Scientific career
- Fields: Healthcare
- Workplaces: University of Heidelberg; University of Toronto; University Health Network; University of Victoria

Gunther Eysenbach (born 1967) is a German-Canadian researcher on healthcare, especially health policy, eHealth, and consumer health informatics.

== Career ==
While a medical student, Eysenbach was on the executive board as elected communication director, later as vice-president of the European Medical Students' Association. He received an M.D. from the University of Freiburg and a Master of Public Health from Harvard School of Public Health. From 1999 to 2002 he founded and headed a research unit on cybermedicine and ehealth at the University of Heidelberg and organized and chaired the World Congress on Internet in Medicine. In March 2002, he emigrated to Canada and since then has been senior scientist at the Centre for Global eHealth Innovation at the University Health Network (Toronto, Ontario, Canada), and associate professor in the Institute of Health Policy, Management and Evaluation at the University of Toronto.

Eysenbach works in the field of consumer health informatics. He has written several books and articles, and organizes conferences. He is editor-in-chief of the Journal of Medical Internet Research. From 2000 to 2008, he was working group chair for the WG Consumer Health Informatics of the International Medical Informatics Association.

Other contributions include:

- Initiator, organizer, and chair of the annual Medicine 2.0 Congress
- Eysenbach has conducted a study on the association between search engine queries and influenza incidence, which was replicated by other research groups 2–3 years later. He coined the terms "infoveillance" and "infodemiology" for these kinds of approaches. Eysenbach also contributed to the concept of "infodemic".
- Eysenbach is initiator of WebCite, an archiving service for scholarly authors and editors citing webpages.
- Together with his former student Paul Kudlow, he cofounded TrendMD, a scholarly recommendation system and cross-publisher content marketing platform
- He is founder and CEO of the Canadian publisher JMIR Publications, which is the publisher of the Journal of Medical Internet Research and 30 other open access journals; JMIR Publications is one of Canada's fastest growing companies according to Business Insider
- He co-founded the Open Access Scholarly Publishing Association (OASPA)

== Bibliography ==
- Lewis, D; Eysenbach, G; Kukafka, R; Jimison, H; Stavri, Z, eds. (2005). Consumer Health Informatics. New York: Springer. ISBN 978-0-387-23991-0. OCLC 60413694.
- Eysenbach, G., ed. (1998). Medicine and Medical Education in Europe - The Eurodoctor. Stuttgart-New York: Thieme. ISBN 978-3-13-115221-3. OCLC 41647056.
- Eysenbach G; Lamers W, eds. (1999). Praxis und Computer (in German). Düsseldorf: Springer-Verlag/med-inform Verlagsges.
- Eysenbach, G (1994). Computer-Manual für Mediziner und Biowissenschaftler (in German). Munich-Baltimore: Urban & Schwarzenberg. ISBN 978-3-541-11841-0. OCLC 30558735.

== See also ==
- WebCite – an on-demand Web archiving service founded by Eysenbach
