= Timeline of the COVID-19 pandemic in Canada =

The following is a timeline of the COVID-19 pandemic in Canada:

== Data ==
All timelines, overviews, breakdowns, lists, and graphs on this page are based on data published in regular official reports by Health Canada in cooperation with Public Health Agency of Canada.

=== Overview of infection waves ===
COVID-19 infection waves in Canada
Waves (1,701 days)	Phases	Dates	Active cases	Deaths (60,769)	Fatality average (35.73 per day)
First (175 days)	Start	January 25, 2020	1	8,839	50.51 per day
First (175 days)	Peak (127 days after the start)	May 30, 2020	35,040	8,839	50.51 per day
First (175 days)	End (48 days after the peak)	July 17, 2020	4,143	8,839	50.51 per day
Second (230 days)	Start	July 18, 2020	4,455	13,312	57.88 per day
Second (230 days)	Peak (177 days after the start)	January 10, 2021	85,595	13,312	57.88 per day
Second (230 days)	End (53 days after the peak)	March 4, 2021	29,907	13,312	57.88 per day
Third (140 days)	Start	March 5, 2021	30,139	4,375	31.25 per day
Third (140 days)	Peak (45 days after the start)	April 18, 2021	89,884	4,375	31.25 per day
Third (140 days)	End (95 days after the peak)	July 22, 2021	4,513	4,375	31.25 per day
Fourth (104 days)	Start	July 23, 2021	4,550	2,569	24.70 per day
Fourth (104 days)	Peak (66 days after the start)	September 26, 2021	51,747	2,569	24.70 per day
Fourth (104 days)	End (38 days after the peak)	November 3, 2021	23,135	2,569	24.70 per day
Fifth (117 days)	Start	November 4, 2021	23,165	7,507	64.16 per day
Fifth (117 days)	Peak (67 days after the start)	January 9, 2022	443,676	7,507	64.16 per day
Fifth (117 days)	End (50 days after the peak)	February 28, 2022	110,551	7,507	64.16 per day
Subsequent (935 days)
Subsequent (935 days)	Start	March 1, 2022	111,931	24,167	25.85 per day
Subsequent (935 days)	Current	September 20, 2024	N/A	24,167	25.85 per day
Subsequent (935 days)	There is no reliable tracking data on recoveries since March 2, 2022.			24,167	25.85 per day

=== Breakdown by year ===
COVID-19 cases (2020–2024) [as of May 25, 2024]
Province / Territory	Total cases	New cases in 2020		New cases in 2021		New cases in 2022		New cases in 2023		New cases in 2024	
Ontario	1,719,315	182,159	(10.60%)	574,202	(33.40%)	794,218	(46.19%)	141,508	(8.23%)	27,228	(1.58%)
Quebec	1,457,505	202,641	(13.90%)	400,427	(27.47%)	682,113	(46.80%)	150,245	(10.31%)	22,079	(1.52%)
Alberta	654,710	101,654	(15.53%)	264,755	(40.44%)	257,582	(39.34%)	24,030	(3.67%)	6,689	(1.02%)
British Columbia	421,680	51,990	(12.33%)	202,859	(48.11%)	138,296	(32.79%)	20,449	(4.85%)	8,086	(1.92%)
Saskatchewan	163,860	15,350	(9.37%)	69,863	(42.64%)	66,357	(40.49%)	10,131	(6.18%)	2,159	(1.32%)
Manitoba	161,892	24,700	(15.26%)	55,400	(34.22%)	73,684	(45.51%)	6,446	(3.98%)	1,662	(1.03%)
Nova Scotia	153,081	1,486	(0.97%)	16,259	(10.62%)	118,211	(77.22%)	14,855	(9.71%)	2,270	(1.48%)
New Brunswick	95,152	599	(0.63%)	13,673	(14.37%)	71,625	(75.27%)	8,002	(8.41%)	1,253	(1.32%)
Newfoundland and Labrador	58,755	390	(0.66%)	3,765	(6.41%)	49,958	(85.03%)	3,429	(5.84%)	1,123	(2.06%)
Prince Edward Island	58,593	96	(0.16%)	1,270	(2.17%)	54,313	(92.70%)	2,549	(4.35%)	365	(0.62%)
Northwest Territories	11,511	24	(0.21%)	2,205	(19.16%)	9,282	(80.63%)	0	(0.00%)	0	(0.00%)
Yukon	4,989	60	(1.20%)	1,695	(33.98%)	3,234	(64.82%)	0	(0.00%)	0	(0.00%)
Nunavut	3,531	266	(7.53%)	537	(15.21%)	2,728	(77.26%)	0	(0.00%)	0	(0.00%)
Repatriated	13	13	(100.00%)	0	(0.00%)	0	(0.00%)	0	(0.00%)	0	(0.00%)
Canada	4,964,587	581,428	(11.71%)	1,606,910	(32.37%)	2,321,601	(46.76%)	381,644	(7.69%)	73,004	(1.47%)

Note: The PHAC stopped providing updates on new cases on May 26, 2024, rendering further updates on this data set impossible.

COVID-19 deaths (2020–2024) [as of September 20, 2024]
Province / Territory	Total deaths	Deaths in 2020		Deaths in 2021		Deaths in 2022		Deaths in 2023		Deaths in 2024	
Quebec	20,504	7,662	(37.37%)	3,482	(16.98%)	6,169	(30.09%)	2,311	(11.27%)	880	(4.29%)
Ontario	18,842	4,578	(24.30%)	5,521	(29.30%)	6,090	(32.32%)	2,006	(10.65%)	647	(3.43%)
British Columbia	7,394	847	(11.45%)	1,567	(21.19%)	2,482	(33.57%)	1,631	(22.06%)	867	(11.73%)
Alberta	6,599	1,116	(16.91%)	2,187	(33.14%)	2,118	(32.10%)	823	(12.47%)	355	(5.38%)
Manitoba	2,571	617	(24.00%)	753	(29.29%)	999	(38.85%)	202	(7.86%)	0	(0.00%)
Saskatchewan	2,066	134	(6.49%)	811	(39.25%)	877	(42.45%)	226	(10.94%)	18	(0.87%)
Nova Scotia	1,115	65	(5.83%)	46	(4.13%)	580	(52.02%)	270	(24.21%)	154	(13.81%)
New Brunswick	1,067	8	(0.75%)	144	(13.49%)	588	(55.11%)	249	(23.34%)	78	(7.31%)
Newfoundland and Labrador	426	4	(0.94%)	14	(3.29%)	277	(65.02%)	92	(21.60%)	39	(9.15%)
Prince Edward Island	124	0	(0.00%)	0	(0.00%)	82	(66.13%)	32	(25.81%)	10	(8.06%)
Yukon	32	1	(3.13%)	13	(40.62%)	18	(56.25%)	0	(0.00%)	0	(0.00%)
Northwest Territories	22	0	(0.00%)	12	(54.55%)	10	(45.45%)	0	(0.00%)	0	(0.00%)
Nunavut	7	1	(14.28%)	3	(42.86%)	3	(42.86%)	0	(0.00%)	0	(0.00%)
Repatriated	0	0	(0.00%)	0	(0.00%)	0	(0.00%)	0	(0.00%)	0	(0.00%)
Canada	60,769	15,033	(24.74%)	14,553	(23.95%)	20,293	(33.39%)	7,842	(12.90%)	3,048	(5.02%)

Note: This table is updated once every three months (next update: January 3, 2025).

=== Deaths by year ===
In this table the starting date is when the first COVID-attributed death in Canada was recorded. Thus, the total average (36.70 over 1,656 days) differs slightly from the official average (35.73 over 1,701 days).

Year	Deaths	Days	Daily average	Fatality Rate
2020	15,033	299 (Mar 9-Dec 31)	50.28	2.59%
2021	14,553	365 (Jan 1-Dec 31)	39.87	0.91%
2022	20,293	365 (Jan 1-Dec 31)	55.60	0.87%
2023	7,842	365 (Jan 1-Dec 31)	21.48	2.06%
2024	3,048	262 (Jan 1-Sep 20)	11.63	2.63%
55 months	60,769	1,656	36.70	1.20%
Note: * Fatality rate for 2024 (2.63%) and the total fatality rate (1.20%) are *********as of May 25, 2024, which is the date when the PHAC stopped *********providing updates on new cases.

Note: This table is updated once every three months (next update: January 3, 2025).

=== Top 50 days with most deaths ===
Of the 50 days, 21 occurred in 2020, 13 in 2021, and 16 in 2022. The data is correct as of February 25, 2022. Since then, reliable daily statistics have not been available (by that date, most Provinces and Territories had already switched from daily reports to weekly reports). This table also does not reflect any changes stemming from official revisions of past reports because such government revisions are limited to monthly reports and do not include updated daily statistics.

Canada
Jan 26, 2022	231	Jan 15, 2021	192	May 12, 2020	176	Feb 1, 2022	166	Jan 14, 2021	154
May 31, 2020	222	Jan 24, 2022	190	Jan 27, 2022	176	Apr 25, 2020	163	Apr 28, 2020	152
Dec 29, 2020	220	May 5, 2020	189	May 2, 2020	175	May 8, 2020	161	Jan 13, 2021	151
Jan 20, 2022	212	May 6, 2020	189	Apr 23, 2020	173	Jan 21, 2021	161	Jan 31, 2022	151
Jan 4, 2021	209	Apr 30, 2020	188	Dec 23, 2020	173	Apr 18, 2020	160	Jan 3, 2021	150
Jan 7, 2021	209	Apr 16, 2020	186	Feb 2, 2022	173	Jan 21, 2022	160	Jan 17, 2021	149
May 1, 2020	207	Jan 19, 2022	181	May 4, 2020	172	Jan 5, 2021	159	Jan 17, 2022	149
Jan 22, 2021	205	Jan 25, 2022	180	May 14, 2020	170	Feb 4, 2021	157	Jan 28, 2022	149
Jan 20, 2021	199	May 10, 2020	178	Feb 3, 2022	168	Feb 4, 2022	157	Feb 9, 2022	149
Dec 28, 2020	195	May 7, 2020	176	Jan 26, 2021	167	Apr 24, 2020	155	Jan 18, 2022	148

=== Top 30 weeks with most deaths ===
Of the 30 weeks, 15 occurred in 2020, 5 in 2021, and 10 in 2022. 8 instances were recorded in January, 6 in April, 5 each in May and December, 4 in February, and 2 in November.

Canada
April 26-May 2, 2020	1,317	December 20-26, 2020	929	January 31-February 6, 2021	645
April 19-25, 2020	1,279	January 9-15, 2022	924	May 17-23, 2020	625
January 16-22, 2022	1,202	December 27, 2020-January 2, 2021	922	May 24-30, 2020	606
January 23-29, 2022	1,117	December 13-19, 2020	863	November 22-28, 2020	563
January 3-9, 2021	1,065	January 24-30, 2021	856	February 13-19, 2022	554
January 17-23, 2021	1,050	December 6-12, 2020	816	January 2-8, 2022	529
May 3-9, 2020	1,023	May 10-16, 2020	802	April 24-30, 2022	515
April 12-18, 2020	1,007	February 6-12, 2022	771	April 17-23, 2022	491
January 10-16, 2021	983	April 5-11, 2020	695	May 8-14, 2022	485
January 30-February 5, 2022	953	November 29-December 5, 2020	695	November 15-21, 2020	482

=== Top 15 months with most deaths ===
Data from this table reveals an inconsistency in the official narrative with regard to how much risk COVID-19 actually posed to the populace. In total, there have been a total of 21 instances where the number of deaths in a particular Province or Territory during one of the months in 2023 or 2024 was sufficiently high to break into the Top 15 for that particular Province or Territory:

- Quebec - 1 instance (Dec 2023)
- British Columbia - 3 instances (Jan 2023, Apr 2023, Oct 2023)
- Nova Scotia - 4 instances (Jan 2023, Feb 2023, Nov 2023, Mar 2024)
- New Brunswick - 5 instances (Jan 2023, Feb 2023, Mar 2023, Apr 2023, Dec 2023)
- Newfoundland and Labrador - 3 instances (Jan 2023, Feb 2023, Mar 2023)
- Prince Edward Island - 5 instances (Jan 2023, Feb 2023, Apr 2023, Jul 2023, Feb 2024)

From 2020 to 2022, most Provinces and Territories endured highly restrictive measures regarding freedom of movement and gathering, however in 2023 - even with some Provinces and Territories recording higher numbers of COVID-attributed deaths than during some months of 2020-2022 - COVID-19 no longer seemed to be a government priority or a national health emergency. Specific examples prove this beyond any doubt:

- In October 202, New Brunswick recorded 62 deaths which both the authorities and the media claimed was 'alarming', but when 53 deaths were recorded in February 2023 that went mostly unnoticed, exposing a clear double standard and cherry picking of data (pushing a certain narrative using official data when it suits that narrative and completely ignoring that same official data when it doesn't).
- Nova Scotia recorded the second highest number of deaths in February 2023 but the authorities and the media largely ignored this fact.
- Similarly, British Columbia recorded 241 COVID-attributed deaths in October 2023, just slightly lower than the number of deaths recorded in that Province in February 2022, April 2022, or October 2022 (when restrictions were in place), but this fact didn't even deserve a mention in the local media, nor was it addressed as a concern by the Provincial Health Officer.

There has also been no official explanation neither by the federal government nor by any of the governments of the three Territories (Northwest Territories, Nunavut, Yukon) regarding the decision of these Territories to discontinue all COVID-related reports (NU did so on 16 April 2022, NT on 20 June 2022, and YT on 19 November 2022).

Top 15 months with most deaths [as of September 20, 2024]
Canada		Quebec		Ontario		British Columbia		Alberta		Manitoba		Saskatchewan	
Total	60,769	Total	20,504	Total	18,842	Total	7,394	Total	6,599	Total	2,571	Total	2,066
January 2021	4,874	May 2020	2,864	January 2021	1,871	December 2020	437	January 2021	628	December 2020	327	October 2021	183
May 2020	4,373	April 2020	1,888	January 2022	1,535	January 2021	342	December 2020	549	November 2020	223	January 2021	166
January 2022	4,046	January 2022	1,693	May 2020	1,339	May 2022	321	October 2021	448	January 2021	208	February 2022	148
April 2020	3,324	January 2021	1,649	April 2020	1,237	February 2022	254	February 2022	338	January 2022	173	October 2022	98
December 2020	3,303	December 2020	1,024	May 2021	888	April 2022	243	September 2021	298	May 2022	161	March 2022	95
February 2022	2,729	February 2022	807	February 2022	885	October 2022	242	January 2022	275	February 2022	132	April 2022	92
April 2022	2,055	April 2022	723	December 2020	875	October 2023	241	April 2022	245	June 2021	93	November 2022	92
November 2020	1,817	November 2020	692	April 2021	703	October 2021	234	November 2020	234	May 2021	78	December 2020	89
February 2021	1,715	February 2021	546	February 2021	680	December 2022	216	May 2022	211	December 2022	76	February 2021	85
October 2022	1,705	December 2022	497	October 2022	583	January 2023	210	October 2022	180	April 2022	75	December 2022	82
May 2021	1,594	October 2020	478	November 2020	500	August 2022	205	November 2022	173	October 2022	72	November 2021	71
December 2022	1,591	June 2020	441	April 2022	461	June 2022	200	February 2021	161	March 2022	69	September 2021	70
May 2022	1,571	July 2022	426	November 2022	417	July 2022	193	December 2022	155	February 2021	68	May 2021	64
November 2022	1,311	December 2023	385	August 2022	390	January 2022	183	May 2021	153	November 2021	64	May 2022	62
October 2021	1,293	August 2022	362	December 2022	379	April 2023	181	March 2022	150	June 2022	63	September 2022	47

Nova Scotia		New Brunswick		Newfoundland and Labrador		Prince Edward Island		Yukon		Northwest Territories		Nunavut	
Total	1,115	Total	1,067	Total	426	Total	124	Total	32	Total	22	Total	7
April 2022	89	December 2022	125	April 2022	65	June 2022	12	February 2022	5	October 2021	8	March 2021	3
February 2023	70	October 2022	107	March 2022	35	January 2022	10	August 2022	4	February 2022	4	December 2020	1
May 2022	67	January 2022	76	February 2022	27	November 2022	10	July 2021	3	January 2022	3	January 2022	1
October 2022	57	February 2022	73	January 2022	20	April 2022	9	November 2021	3	November 2021	2	March 2022	1
November 2022	55	October 2021	62	August 2022	20	October 2022	9	March 2022	3	March 2022	2	April 2022	1
February 2022	50	February 2023	53	December 2022	20	April 2023	8	June 2021	2	August 2021	1	-	-
March 2022	49	April 2022	50	May 2022	18	May 2022	7	January 2022	2	September 2021	1	-	-
November 2023	49	March 2022	48	October 2022	18	February 2022	6	October 2020	1	April 2022	1	-	-
September 2022	45	January 2023	41	November 2022	18	September 2022	6	May 2021	1	-	-	-	-
June 2022	44	December 2021	29	March 2023	18	January 2023	6	August 2021	1	-	-	-	-
May 2020	39	March 2023	28	July 2022	14	February 2024	6	September 2021	1	-	-	-	-
December 2022	38	November 2022	23	February 2023	14	August 2022	5	October 2021	1	-	-	-	-
January 2023	33	July 2022	22	September 2022	12	July 2022	4	December 2021	1	-	-	-	-
March 2024	33	April 2023	21	January 2023	12	February 2023	4	April 2022	1	-	-	-	-
January 2022	31	December 2023	21	June 2022	10	July 2023	4	May 2022	1	-	-	-	-

=== Top 15 weeks with most new cases ===
Top 15 weeks with most new cases [as of May 25, 2024]
Canada		Ontario		Quebec		Alberta		British Columbia		Saskatchewan		Manitoba	
Total	4,964,587	Total	1,719,315	Total	1,457,505	Total	654,710	Total	421,680	Total	163,860	Total	161,892
Jan 3-9, 2022	280,786	Dec 27, 2021-Jan 2, 2022	94,358	Jan 3-9, 2022	103,258	Jan 10-16, 2022	40,647	Dec 27, 2021-Jan 2, 2022	21,718	Jan 17-23, 2022	9,300	Jan 3-9, 2022	15,764
Dec 27, 2021-Jan 2, 2022	259,500	Jan 3-9, 2022	87,071	Dec 27, 2021-Jan 2, 2022	97,829	Jan 3-9, 2022	33,246	Jan 3-9, 2022	19,784	Jan 24-30, 2022	8,380	Jan 10-16, 2022	10,326
Jan 10-16, 2022	216,063	Jan 10-16, 2022	69,495	Jan 10-16, 2022	56,460	Jan 17-23, 2022	25,123	Jan 10-16, 2022	15,902	Jan 10-16, 2022	8,319	Dec 27, 2021-Jan 2, 2022	8,744
Jan 17-23, 2022	155,445	Jan 17-23, 2022	48,579	Dec 20-26, 2021	52,483	Dec 27, 2021-Jan 2, 2022	21,535	Jan 17-23, 2022	14,094	Jan 3-9, 2022	5,428	Jan 17-23, 2022	5,721
Dec 20-26, 2021	133,800	Dec 20-26, 2021	47,219	Jan 17-23, 2022	39,877	Jan 24-30, 2022	18,878	Dec 20-26, 2021	12,705	Jan 31-Feb 6, 2022	5,388	Jan 24-30, 2022	4,542
Jan 24-30, 2022	111,270	Jan 24-30, 2022	33,586	Apr 4-10, 2022	27,710	Jan 31-Feb 6, 2022	14,732	Jan 24-30, 2022	11,827	Sep 20-26, 2021	3,398	Dec 20-26, 2021	3,648
Jan 31-Feb 6, 2022	87,875	Apr 12-18, 2021	30,387	Jan 24-30, 2022	23,838	May 3–9, 2021	13,892	Jan 31-Feb 6, 2022	9,828	Oct 4-10, 2021	3,389	Jan 31-Feb 6, 2022	3,342
Apr 4-10, 2022	75,229	Apr 19-25, 2021	28,356	Jan 31-Feb 6, 2022	21,484	Apr 26-May 2, 2021	13,092	Apr 5-11, 2021	7,829	Sep 13-19, 2021	3,385	Feb 7-13, 2022	3,341
Feb 7-13, 2022	64,862	Apr 26-May 2, 2021	25,114	Dec 13-19, 2021	19,742	Nov 30-Dec 6, 2020	12,122	Feb 7-13, 2022	7,233	Dec 27, 2021-Jan 2, 2022	3,184	May 17–23, 2021	3,285
Apr 18-24, 2022	64,833	Apr 5-11, 2021	25,009	Apr 18-24, 2022	18,648	Sep 13-19, 2021	11,562	Apr 12-18, 2021	7,181	Sep 27-Oct 2, 2021	3,145	May 10–16, 2021	3,200
Apr 12-18, 2021	60,980	Jan 4-10, 2021	24,820	Jan 4-10, 2021	18,517	Dec 7-13, 2020	11,533	Mar 29-Apr 4, 2021	6,612	Sep 6-12, 2021	2,576	Nov 23-29, 2020	2,939
Mar 28-Apr 3, 2022	60,508	Apr 11-17, 2022	24,106	Feb 7-13, 2022	17,890	Sep 20-26, 2021	11,025	Apr 19-25, 2021	6,446	Feb 14-20, 2022	2,522	Nov 9-15, 2020	2,817
Jan 4-10, 2021	57,826	Jan 31-Feb 6, 2022	23,810	Dec 28, 2020-Jan 3, 2021	17,649	Apr 19-25, 2021	11,011	Nov 23-29, 2020	5,761	Oct 11-17, 2021	2,361	May 3–9, 2021	2,676
Arp 19-25, 2021	57,258	Apr 4-10, 2022	23,480	Mar 28-Apr 3, 2022	17,453	Sep 27-Oct 3, 2021	10,933	Apr 26-May 2, 2021	5,502	Aug 30-Sep 5, 2021	2,263	Nov 16-22, 2020	2,597
Apr 11-17, 2022	56,827	Apr 18-24, 2022	22,134	Jun 27-Jul 3, 2022	17,427	Dec 20-26, 2021	10,396	Mar 22-28, 2021	5,478	Jan 11-17, 2021	2,162	May 24–30, 2021	2,356

Nova Scotia		New Brunswick		Newfoundland and Labrador		Prince Edward Island		Northwest Territories		Yukon		Nunavut	
Total	153,081	Total	95,152	Total	58,755	Total	58,593	Total	11,511	Total	4,989	Total	3,531
Apr 18-24, 2022	7,508	Mar 28-Apr 3, 2022	6,753	Jan 10-16, 2022	4,474	Mar 7-13, 2022	3,407	Jan 24-30, 2022	948	Jan 10-16, 2022	513	Jan 31-Feb 6, 2022	350
Apr 4-10, 2022	6,991	Jan 3-9, 2022	4,581	Mar 7-13, 2022	4,098	Feb 28-Mar 6, 2022	2,924	Jan 10-16, 2022	940	Jan 3-9, 2022	370	Feb 28-Mar 6, 2022	327
Apr 11-17, 2022	6,912	Apr 4-10, 2022	3,958	Mar 14-20, 2022	3,656	Apr 4-10, 2022	2,576	Jan 31-Feb 6, 2022	936	Jan 24-30, 2022	212	Jan 17-23, 2022	303
Jan 3-9, 2022	6,287	Dec 27, 2021-Jan 2, 2022	3,823	Jan 3-9, 2022	3,253	Mar 28-Apr 3, 2022	2,454	Jan 17-23, 2022	925	Jan 17-23, 2022	211	Feb 21-27, 2022	276
Apr 25-May 1, 2022	5,436	Jan 17-23, 2022	3,242	Mar 21-27, 2022	2,880	Jul 11-17, 2022	2,244	Feb 7-13, 2022	793	Nov 15-21, 2021	200	Feb 14-20, 2022	259
Jul 11-17, 2022	5,132	Apr 18-24, 2022	2,956	Feb 28-Mar 6, 2022	2,830	Apr 11-17, 2022	2,229	Feb 14-20, 2022	742	Nov 8-14, 2021	164	Mar 7-13, 2022	245
Jan 10-16, 2022	5,023	Mar 21-27, 2022	2,781	Jan 17-23, 2022	2,376	Mar 21-27, 2022	2,038	Mar 28-Apr 3, 2022	618	Jan 31-Feb 6, 2022	125	Jan 24-30, 2022	227
Dec 27, 2021-Jan 2, 2022	4,750	Jan 24-30, 2022	2,706	Mar 28-Apr 3, 2022	2,376	Jan 17-23, 2022	1,955	Feb 21-27, 2022	597	Mar 28-Apr 3, 2022	123	Feb 7-13, 2022	220
Mar 28-Apr 3, 2022	4,188	Mar 7-13, 2022	2,575	Dec 27, 2021-Jan 2, 2022	2,327	Apr 18-24, 2022	1,928	Jan 3-9, 2022	572	Jun 21-27, 2021	121	Dec 27, 2021-Jan 2, 2022	179
Dec 20-26, 2021	3,991	Feb 28-Mar 6, 2022	2,520	Feb 21-27, 2022	1,962	Apr 25-May 1, 2022	1,738	Mar 21-27, 2022	490	Feb 7-13, 2022	116	Nov 16-22, 2020	112
Jan 17-23, 2022	3,739	Jan 10-16, 2022	2,289	Apr 4-10, 2022	1,891	Mar 14-20, 2022	1,604	Feb 28-Mar 6, 2022	440	Apr 18-24, 2022	101	Mar 14-20, 2022	108
Mar 21-27, 2022	3,453	Feb 21-27, 2022	2,195	Jan 31-Feb 6, 2022	1,816	Jan 10-16, 2022	1,597	Mar 7-13, 2022	392	Nov 1-7, 2021	96	Jan 3-9, 2022	102
May 2–8, 2022	3,415	Feb 7-13, 2022	2,120	Feb 7-13, 2022	1,617	Feb 14-20, 2022	1,568	Mar 14-20, 2022	329	Apr 4-10, 2022	96	Jan 10-16, 2022	78
May 9–15, 2022	3,118	Jul 11-17, 2022	2,048	Jan 24-30, 2022	1,592	Jul 18-24, 2022	1,524	Oct 4-10, 2022	302	Nov 22-28, 2021	94	Mar 21-27, 2022	71
Jan 24-30, 2022	3,114	Jan 31-Feb 6, 2022	2,040	Feb 14-20, 2022	1,546	Feb 21-27, 2022	1,465	Sep 27-Oct 3, 2022	225	Mar 21-27, 2022	93	Apr 26-May 2, 2021	65

Note: The PHAC stopped providing updates on new cases on May 26, 2024, rendering further updates on this data set impossible.

== Graphs ==
=== National ===
==== Milestones - Cases (as of May 25, 2024) ====
This graph shows dates when milestones (250,000 new cases) were reached. The last figure shows the final total number of confirmed cases recorded.

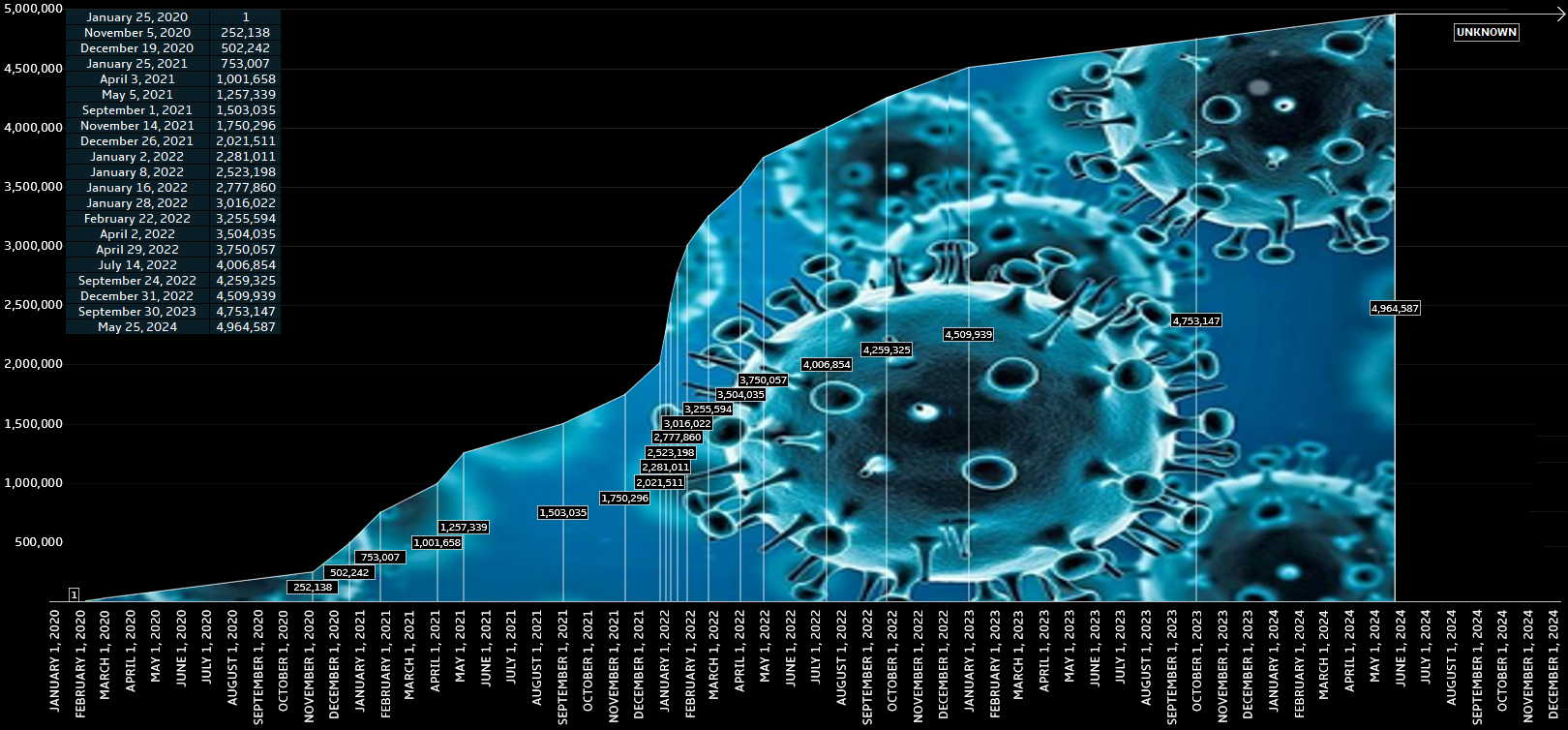

Note: The PHAC stopped providing updates on new cases on May 26, 2024, rendering further updates on this data set impossible.

==== Milestones - Deaths (as of September 20, 2024) ====
This graph shows dates when milestones (2,500 new deaths) were reached. The last figure shows the current total number of confirmed deaths and is a placeholder until the next milestone is recorded.

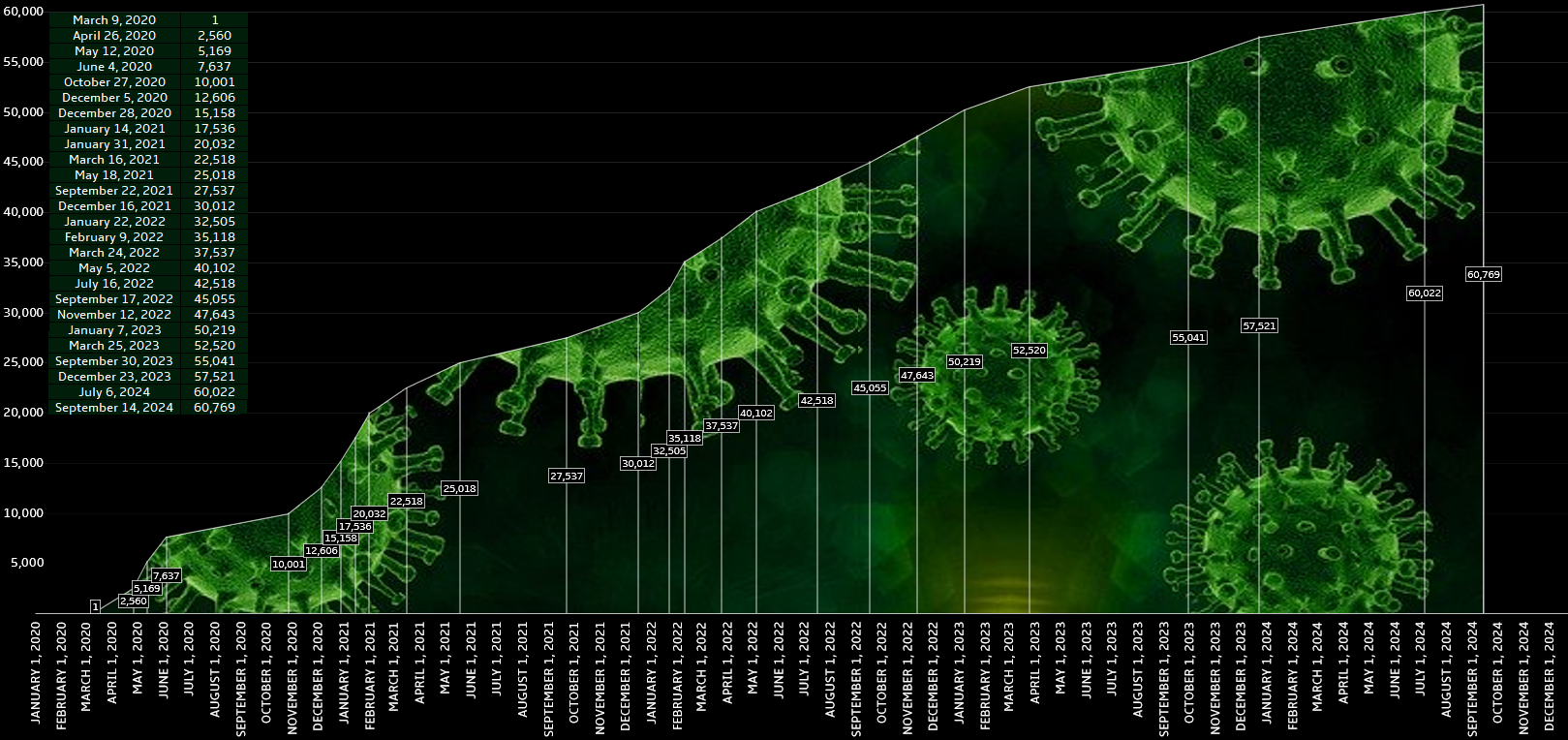

Note: This graph is updated once every three months (next update: January 3, 2025).

==== Waves - Cases (as of July 17, 2022) ====
This simplified graph shows the first five waves, noting the number of active cases at the peak and at the end of each wave. There is no official data on recoveries since March 1, 2022, and last somewhat reliable data for the sixth wave was recorded on July 17, 2022. The end of the sixth wave, as well as peaks and ends of all further waves could only have been estimated based on the number of hospitalizations, however this data was not reliable enough to warrant any further updates (furthermore, data on hospitalizations has been non-existent since November 23, 2022). As a result, this graph has been discontinued.

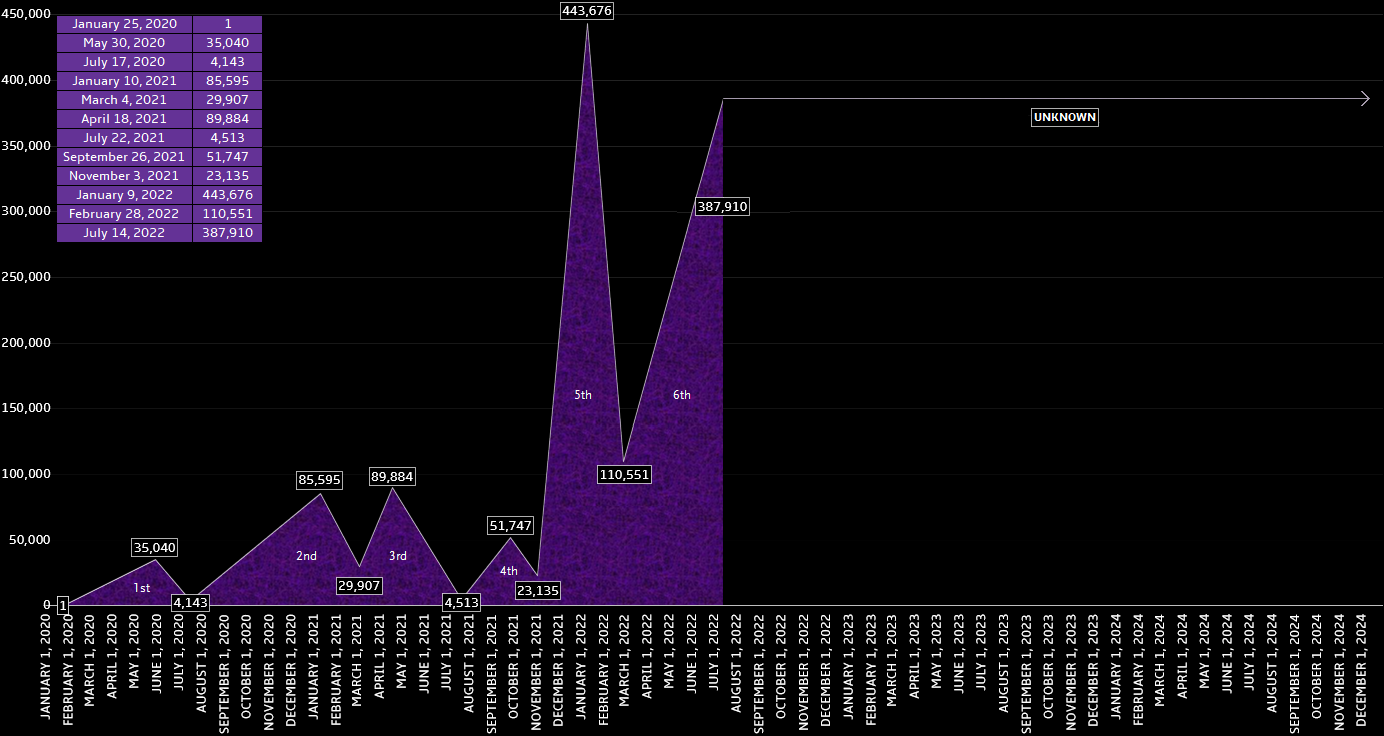

Note: This graph can no longer be updated.

==== Waves - Deaths (as of September 20, 2024) ====
This simplified graph shows daily averages of COVID-attributed deaths across Canada during each of the waves.

Governments (federal or provincial/territorial) are yet to address the inconsistency regarding their official stance towards COVID-19 in Canada from March 2020 to March 2022, compared to the stance since April 2022. During the 3rd wave (average of 31 deaths per day) and the 4th wave (average of 25 deaths per day), governments deemed it necessary to impose harsh restrictions upon the populace. However, by the summer of 2022, all restrictions had been repealed and have not been reinstated, even though during this period Canada has been recording an average of 26 COVID-attributed deaths per day. The only logical conclusion is that either restrictions should have been kept in place throughout this period as well, or they were never needed to begin with. Furthermore, since authorities are not addressing the average of 26 COVID-attributed deaths per day (March 1, 2022 to September 20, 2024) as a national health emergency, it can be surmised that 26 deaths per day is simply the 'new normal' for Canada. And, if that is the case, then previous waves (especially 3rd wave and 4th wave) should have been regarded as non-events.

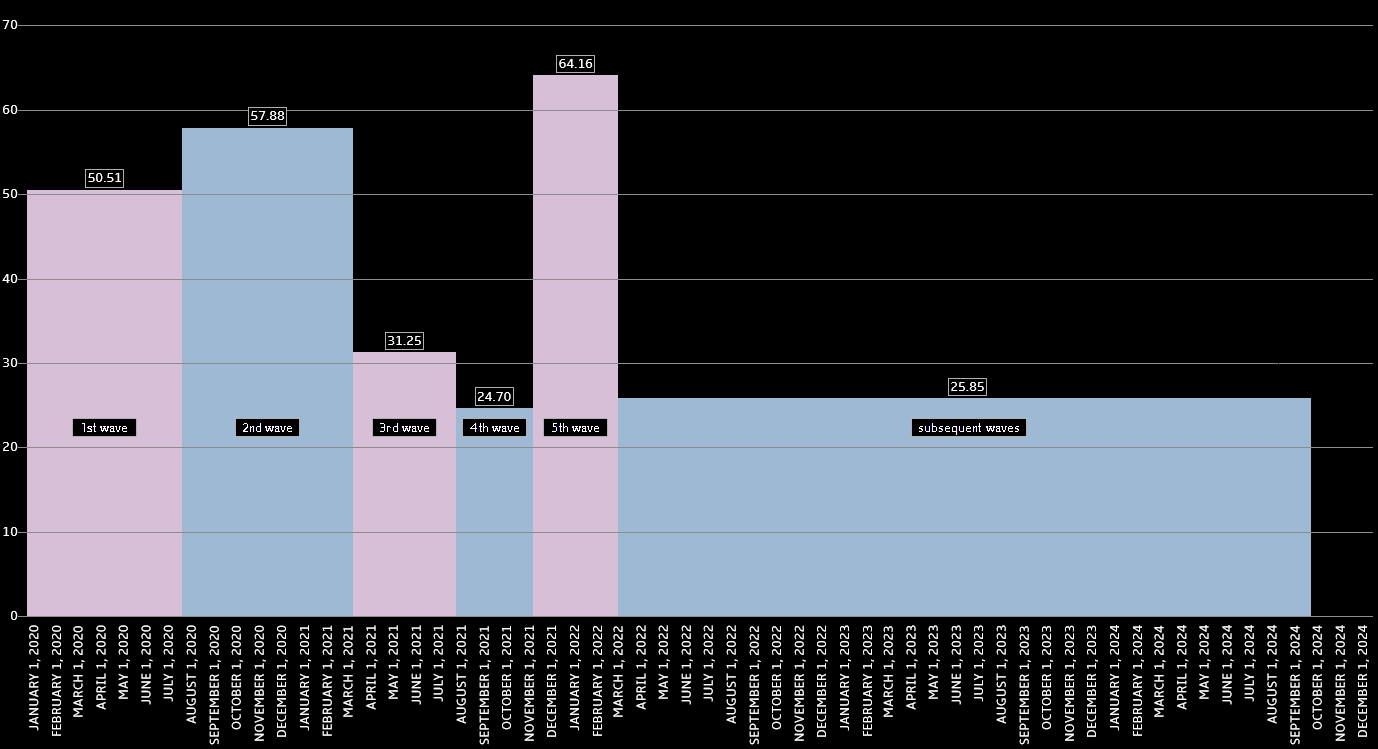

Note: This graph is updated once every three months (next update: January 3, 2025).

==== Cases (as of May 25, 2024) ====
This graph shows the number of new cases in Canada each month.

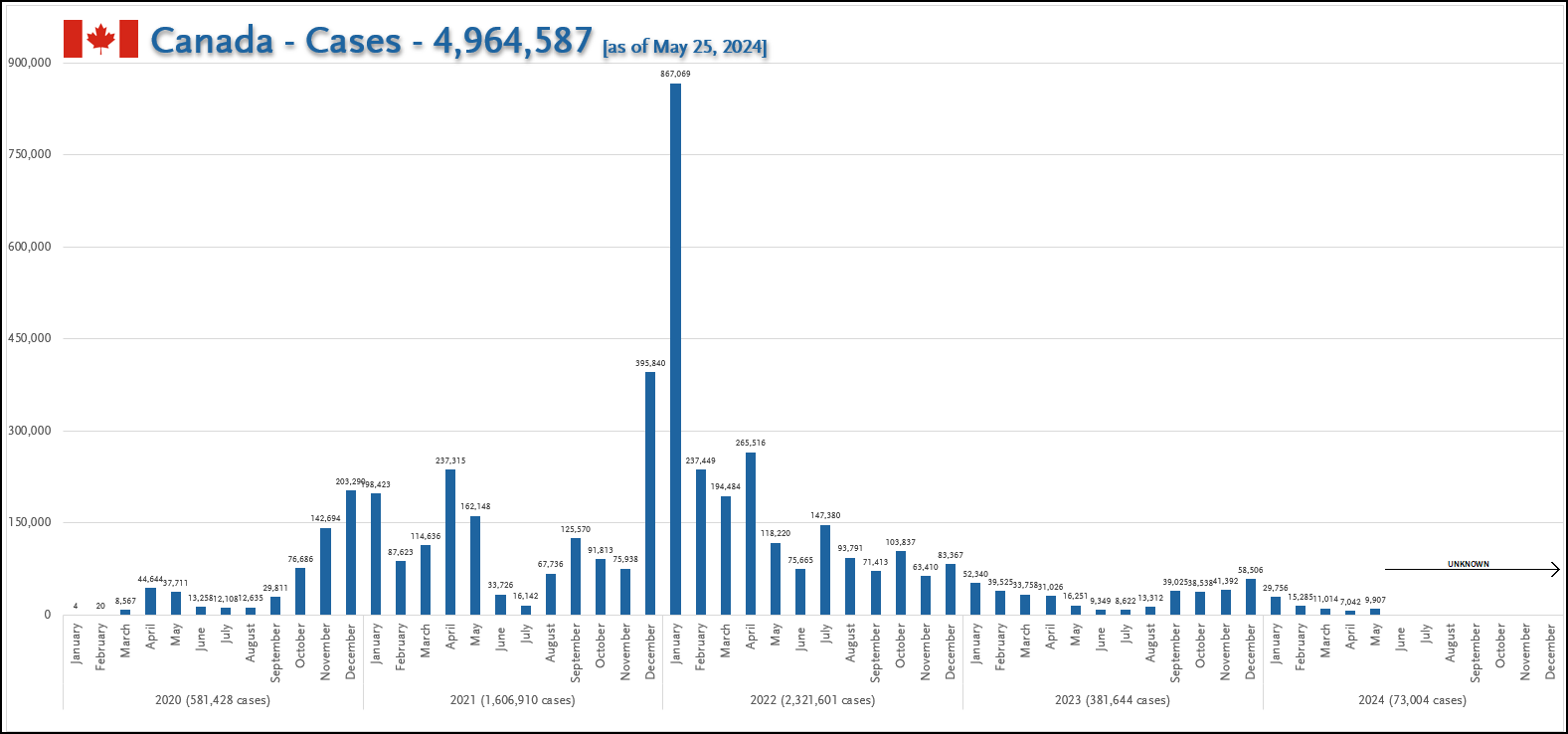

Note: The PHAC stopped providing updates on new cases on May 26, 2024, rendering further updates on this data set impossible.

==== Deaths (as of September 20, 2024) ====
This graph shows the number of deaths in Canada each month.

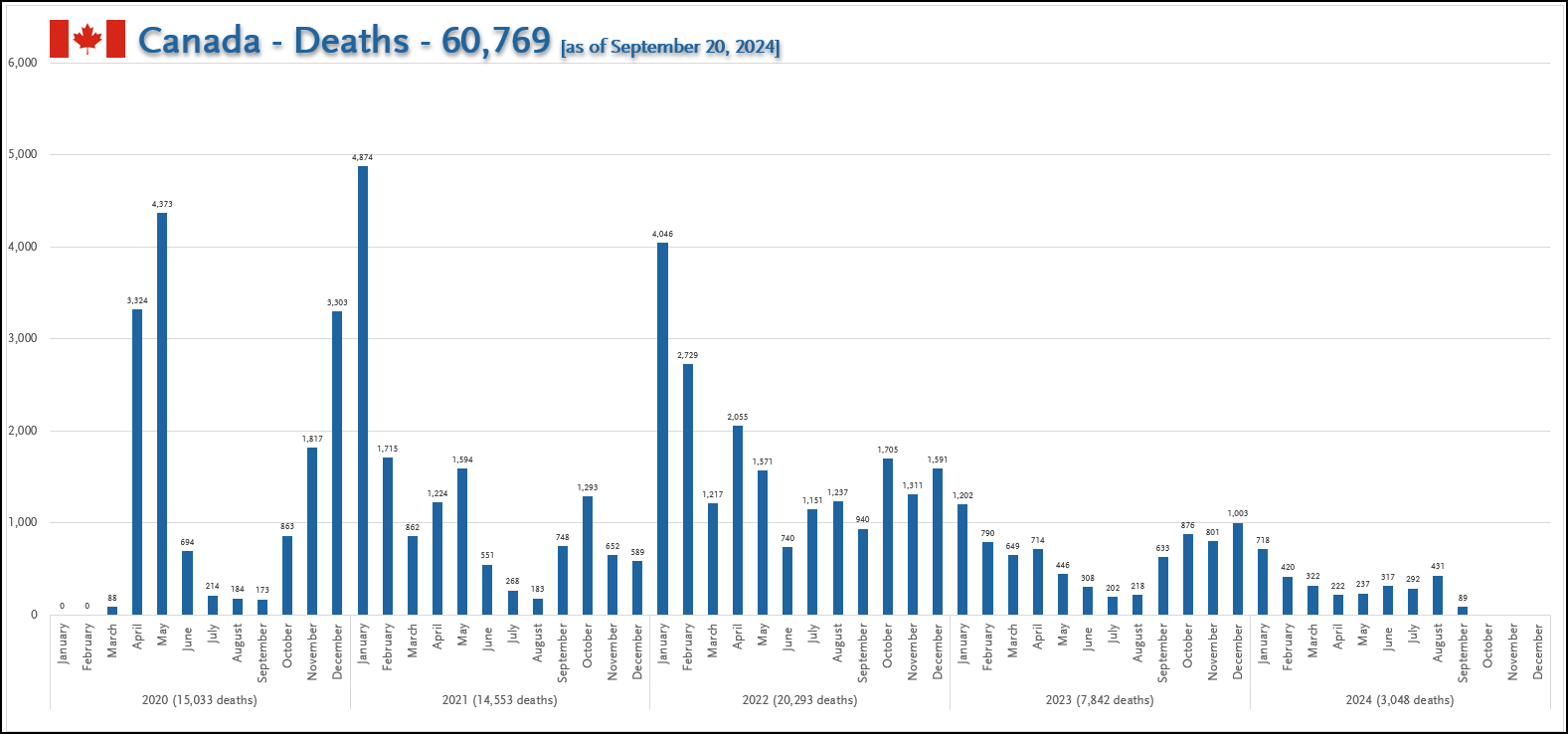

Note: This graph is updated once every three months (next update: January 3, 2025).

==== Monthly Death Rate (as of May 25, 2024) ====
This graph shows the fatality rate for each month (number of deaths during a particular month as percentage of all reported cases during that month).

The graph reveals that official data is likely flawed and that government offices were unable to collect data on all new cases correctly during the first three months of the pandemic (March to May 2020) which exponentially skewed the fatality rate upwards. It is also highly likely that new cases have been severely under-reported since October 2022. This is proven by the official fatality rate (ranging from 1.62% to 3.29%) during the October 2022 to May 2024 period which is higher (and by quite a bit) than the official fatality rate (ranging from 0.15% to 2.46%) during the July 2020 to September 2022 period, even though the pandemic has officially been treated as a non-issue in 2023 and 2024.

The official average fatality rate for the whole 2020-2024 period is 1.20% of all reported cases. However, it is estimated that most cases (around 85% of all cases) have gone unreported and that at least 35,000,000 people in Canada were infected with at least one of the COVID-19 variants at some point, which means that the actual fatality rate is likely less than 0.20% (comparable to any seasonal flu). This estimate is validated by data shown on this graph for December 2021 (0.15%) and January 2022 (0.47%). If the fatality rate was 0.15% during the second worst month of the whole 2020-2024 period (December 2021: 395,840 new cases and 589 deaths) and 0.47% during the worst month (January 2022: 867,069 new cases and 4,046 deaths), then it is reasonable to assume that the average fatality rate in Canada has been around 0.20% throughout the four years, revealing a survival rate of 99.80%.

Additionally, it is still unknown (and may forever remain so) how many of the COVID-attributed deaths reported as 'COVID deaths' were actually due to COVID (i.e. a person dying of COVID) and how many were due to a combination of multiple comorbidity factors (i.e. a person dying with COVID).

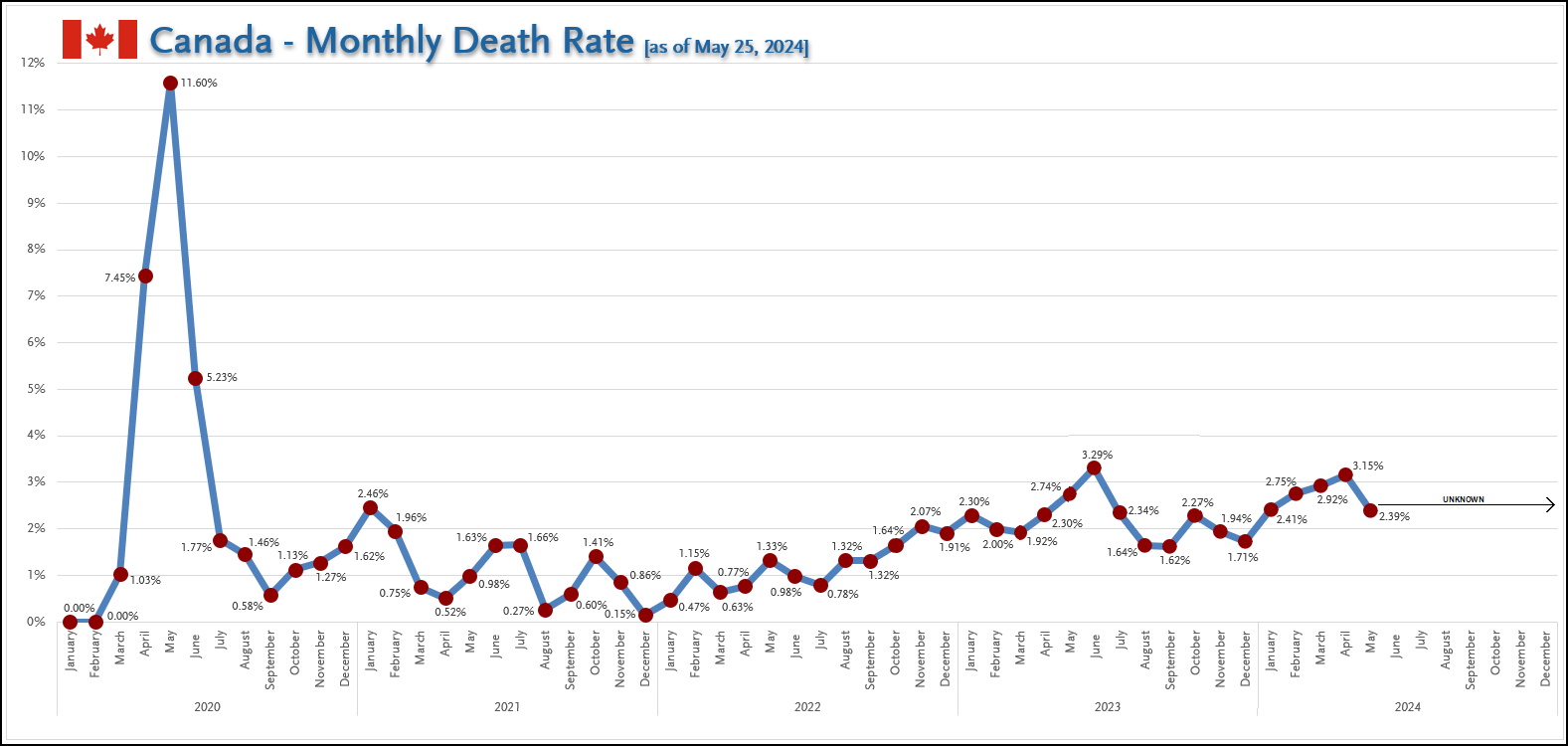

Note: The PHAC stopped providing updates on new cases on May 26, 2024, rendering further updates on this data set impossible.

==== Accumulated Fatality Rate (as of May 25, 2024) ====
This graph shows the total fatality rate throughout the four-year period.

Same as the previous graph, it reveals that official data is likely flawed and that government offices were unable to collect data on all new cases correctly during the first few months of the pandemic (March to May 2020) which exponentially skewed the fatality rate upwards and assured the accumulated fatality rate would never be accurate in the long term. It also proves beyond any doubt that vaccines had little impact - if any - on reduction of the overall fatality rate.

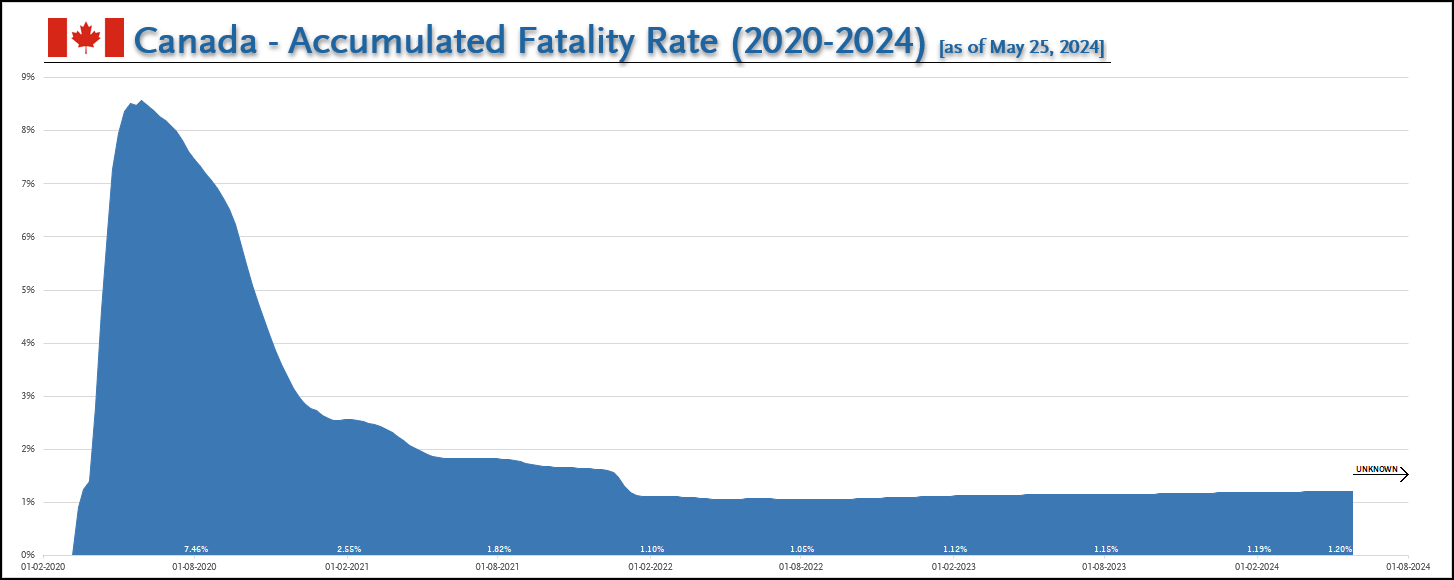

Note: The PHAC stopped providing updates on new cases on May 26, 2024, rendering further updates on this data set impossible.

=== Provinces and Territories ===
==== Cases (as of May 25, 2024) ====
This graph shows the number of new cases per month in each of the Provinces and Territories.

The three territories - Nunavut, Northwest Territories, and Yukon - discontinued reports on new cases in 2022 (on April 16, June 20, and November 19, respectively), without an official explanation as to why.

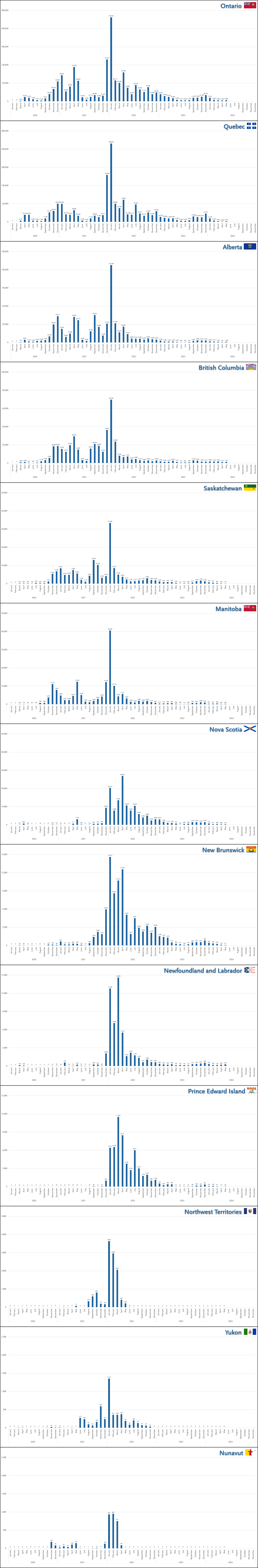

Note: The PHAC stopped providing updates on new cases on May 26, 2024, rendering further updates on this data set impossible.

==== Deaths (as of September 20, 2024) ====
This graph shows the number of deaths per month in each of the Provinces and Territories.

Even though the province of Manitoba recorded 41 COVID-attributed deaths in December 2023 (which was an 11-month high), the province abruptly discontinued reports on such deaths in January 2024. The decision to no longer provide this data for the province of Manitoba is one of the many red flags which have been recorded across Canada over the course of four years when it comes to collection of COVID-related statistical information.

Another case proving official policies have been misguided is that of Nova Scotia where few COVID-attributed deaths were recorded in 2020 and 2021, but the government instituted restrictions regardless. Yet, the same authorities removed all restrictions in 2022, during the time when the province was recording peak fatality numbers. Furthermore, restrictions were never reinstated even though Nova Scotia continued to see an above-average number of COVID-attributed fatalities in early 2023 and early 2024. Again, the only logical conclusion is that either restrictions should have been kept in place throughout this period as well, or they had been never been needed to begin with.

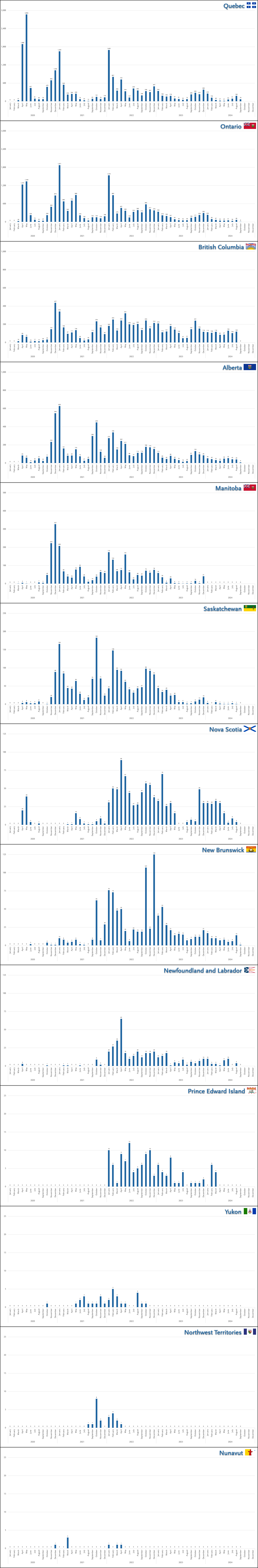

Note: This graph is updated once every three months (next update: January 3, 2025).

==== Total Cases (as of May 25, 2024) ====
This graph shows the accumulated number of new cases for each of the Provinces and Territories.

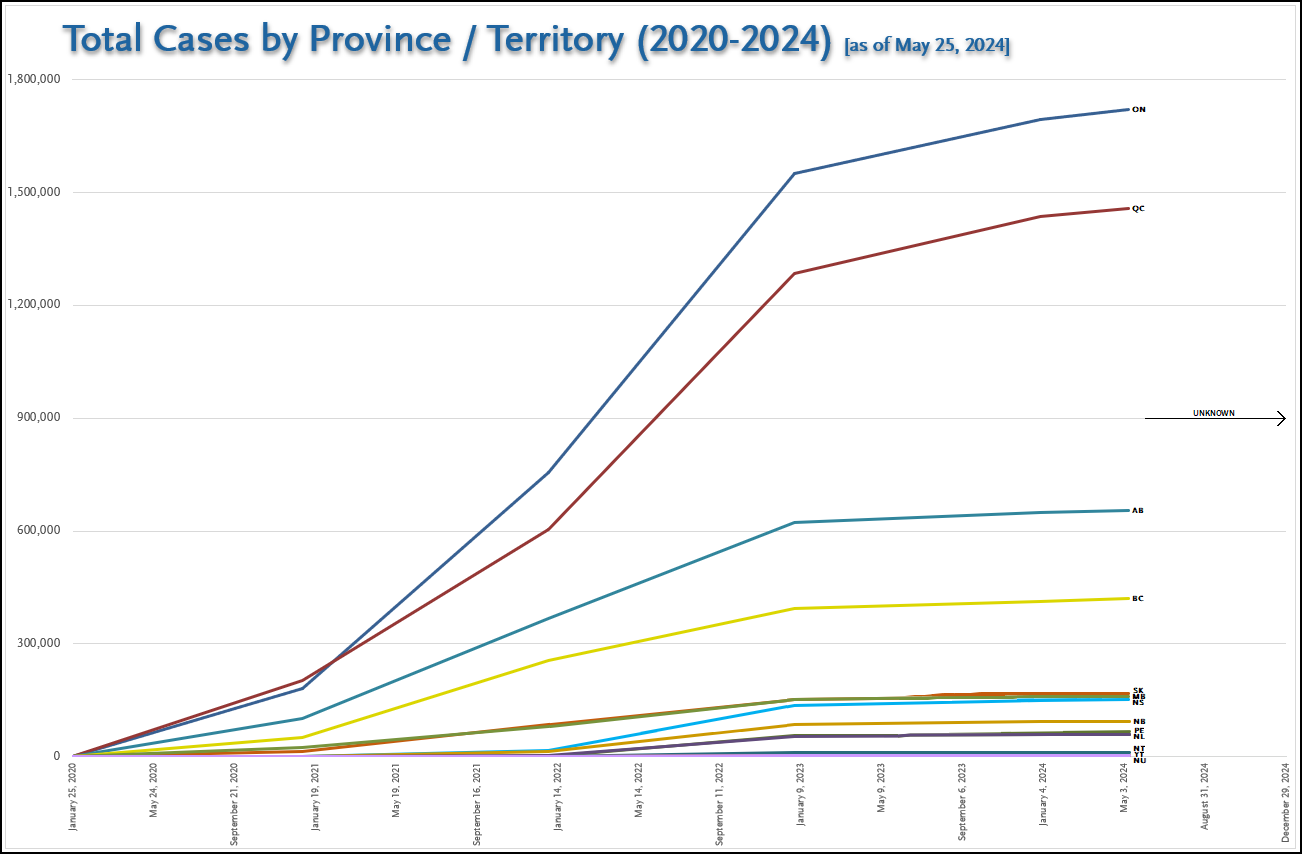

Note: The PHAC stopped providing updates on new cases on May 26, 2024, rendering further updates on this data set impossible.

==== Total Deaths (as of September 20, 2024) ====
This graph shows the accumulated number of deaths for each of the Provinces and Territories.

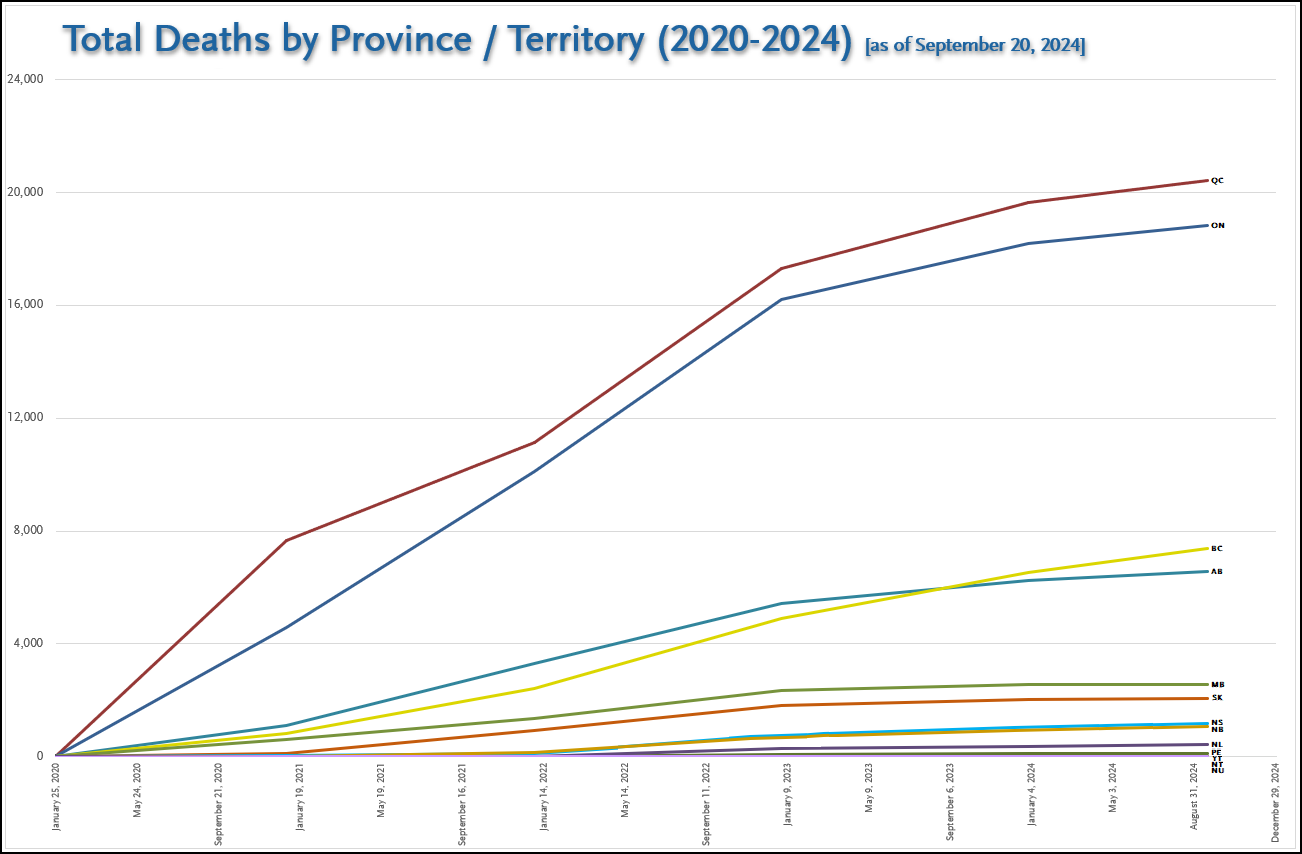

Note: This graph is updated once every three months (next update: January 3, 2025).

=== Overviews by Year ===
==== Cases and Deaths in Canada (2020-2024) ====
This graph shows the number of new cases and the number of deaths in Canada each year from 2020 to 2024.

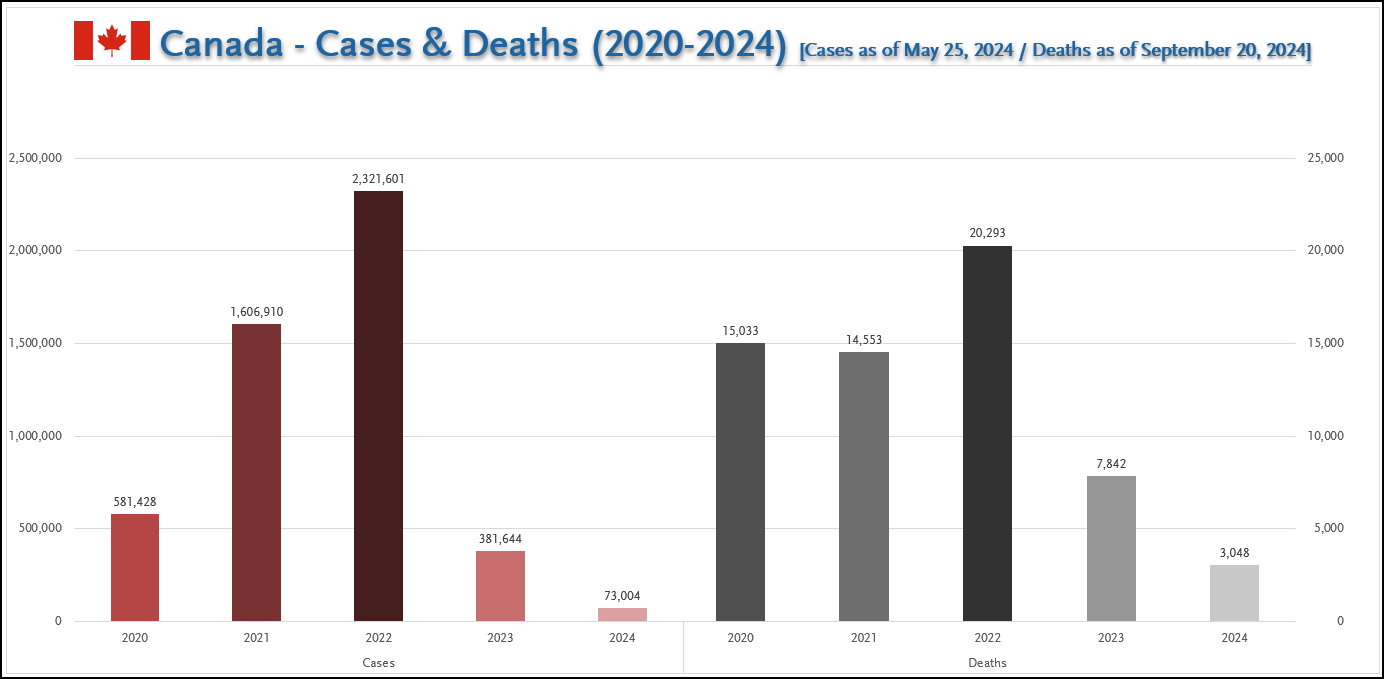

Note: This graph is updated once every three months (next update: January 3, 2025), however it can only be updated for deaths, as the PHAC stopped providing updates on new cases on May 26, 2024.

==== Cases in Provinces and Territories (2020-2024) ====
This graph shows the number of new cases in each of the Provinces and Territories each year from 2020 to 2024.

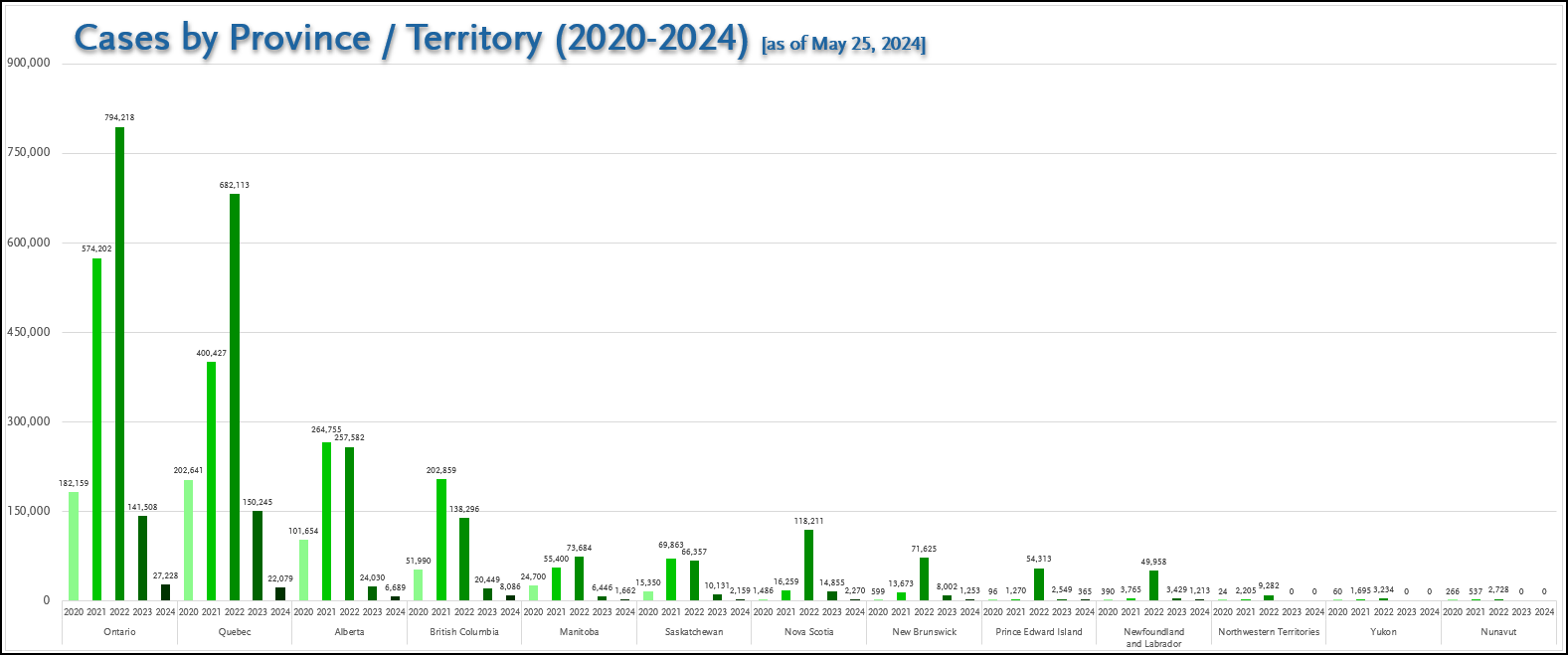

Note: The PHAC stopped providing updates on new cases on May 26, 2024, rendering further updates on this data set impossible.

==== Deaths in Provinces and Territories (2020-2024) ====
This graph shows the number of deaths in each of the Provinces and Territories each year from 2020 to 2024.

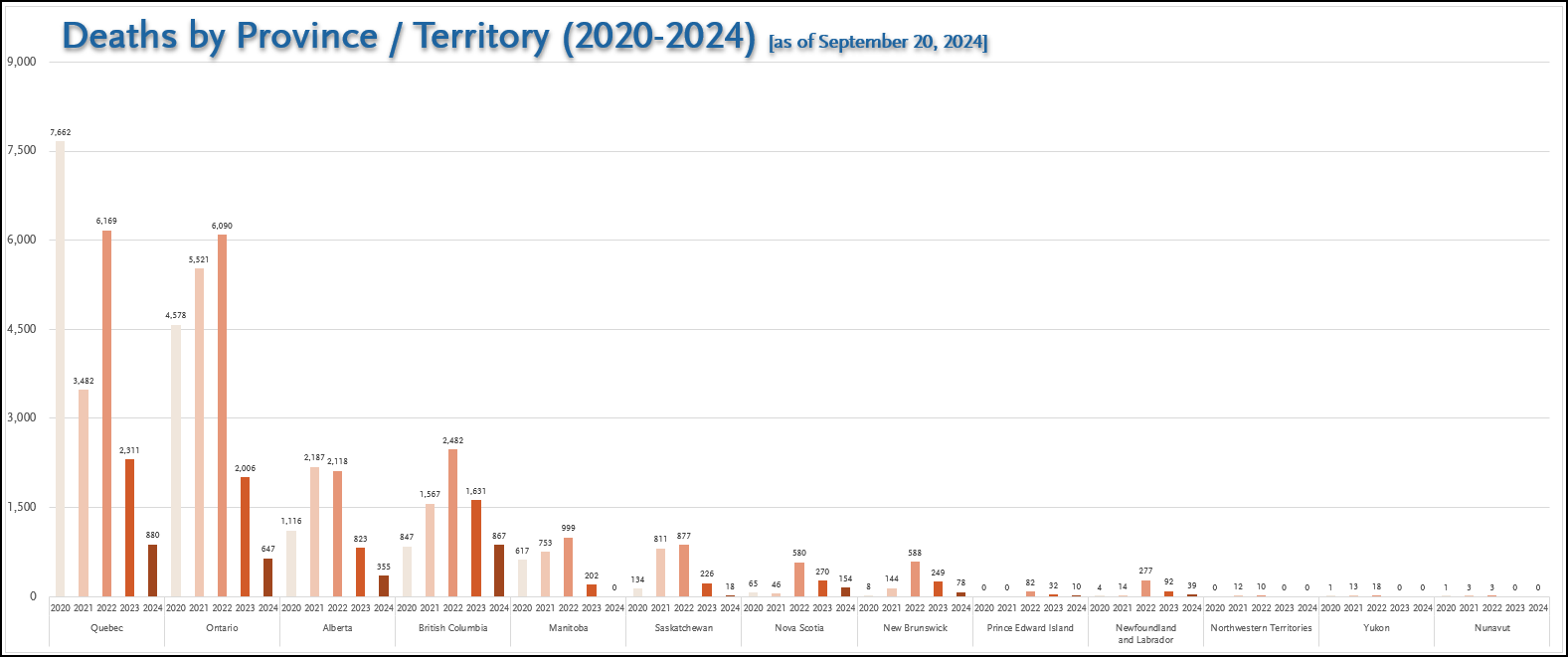

Note: This graph is updated once every three months (next update: January 3, 2025).

== Chronology ==
=== 2019 ===
==== December ====
In April, Jitendra Prasad, the leader of Alberta Health Services' procurement department told the Edmonton Journal that in early December, he had heard from sources in China of a strange flu. Prasad claimed that by mid-December, he had started doubling orders of PPE, and in late December, he placed an order for a half a million N95 masks.

On December 31, 2019, the Wuhan Municipal Health Commission in China reported a cluster of cases of pneumonia in Wuhan, Hubei Province. This news spread to FluTrackers, and then similar announcements came from the Hong Kong and Taiwan governments and many news outlets on the outbreak in Wuhan. A novel coronavirus was eventually identified.

=== 2020 ===
==== January ====
On January 7, 2020, when it appeared that there was a health crisis emerging in Wuhan, Dr. Theresa Tam, Chief Public Health Officer of Canada, was quoted advising Canadians: "There has been no evidence to date that this illness, whatever it's caused by, is spread easily from person to person; no health care workers caring for the patients have become ill; a positive sign.

On January 17, the Canada Border Services Agency (CBSA) indicated plans were in progress "to implement signage" in the Montreal, Toronto, and Vancouver airports to raise awareness of the virus, and that there would be an additional health screening question added to the electronic kiosks for passengers arriving from central China. The agency noted the overall risk to Canadians was low and there were no direct flights from Wuhan to Canada. The CBSA said it would not be, at that time, implementing extra screening measures, but would "monitor the situation closely".

On January 23, the federal Minister of Health, Patty Hajdu, said that five or six people were being monitored for signs of the virus. That same day, Dr. Theresa Tam was a member of the WHO committee that broadcast that it was too early to declare a public health emergency of international concern. The following day in Wuhan China construction began on a new hospital to treat COVID patients that would take only 10 days to build and was widely reported around the world.

On January 25, the first identified presumptive case in Canada was a male in his 50s who travelled between Wuhan and Guangzhou before returning to Toronto on January 22. Canada issued a travel advisory against non-essential travel to China due to the outbreak, including a regional travel advisory to avoid all travel to the province of Hubei. Federal health officials stated that the risk in Canada was low. On January 26, Tam stated "There is no clear evidence that this virus is spread easily from person to person. The risk to Canadians remains low." Final testing conducted at the National Microbiology Laboratory in Winnipeg, Manitoba confirmed the presumptive case on January 27. On January 27, Canada confirmed its first case.

On January 29, the health committee of parliament holds a meeting on the Canadian response to the outbreak of coronavirus. Liberal MP Marcus Powlowski, a doctor, asks Theresa Tam since the Chinese health authorities led by Xiaowei Ma were saying that covid-19 was being spread by asymptomatic patients (as reported in the New York Times), Canada should require travellers from China to quarantine for 14 days. Tam suggested that at that point, quarantining was not thought to be necessary. On the same day, Dr. Theresa Tam told Canadians that "It's going to be rare (COVID-19), but we are expecting cases" and Minister of Foreign Affairs François-Philippe Champagne announced that an aircraft would be sent to repatriate Canadians from the areas affected by the virus in China.

On January 30, the WHO declared the coronavirus was a "public health emergency of international concern".

==== February ====
On February 1, the government's position remained that it would be discriminatory to exclude travellers from China, the politico-geographical source of the disease.

On February 2, the Canadian Armed Forces announced that it planned to charter a plane to assist in the evacuation of Canadian nationals still in Wuhan once given authorization by China, intending to fly them to CFB Trenton for repatriation and medical screenings. Only those that had entered the country with a Canadian passport would be allowed to take this flight. The first plane landed at CFB Trenton on February 7. On February 21, a chartered flight of 131 Canadians who were quarantined aboard Diamond Princess after an outbreak on the cruise ship in Japan, and who all tested negative for the virus, were brought to CFB Trenton for additional screening before being transported by bus to the NAV Centre in Cornwall, Ontario to be quarantined.

On February 10, University of Regina psychology professor Dr. Gordon J. G. Asmundson and University of British Columbia psychiatry professor Dr. Steven Taylor coined the neologism 'coronaphobia' to refer to fear of COVID-19 and its psychological impacts. In an editorial, Asmundson and Taylor expanded on COVID-19-related mental health impacts by introducing the constructs of COVID Stress Syndrome and 'COVID Stress Disorder'. Per Asmundson and Taylor's definition, COVID Stress Syndrome centers around fears about contamination and the dangerousness of COVID-19, and also involves fears of socioeconomic consequences, xenophobic attitudes, traumatic stress, and compulsive checking and reassurance seeking symptoms. COVID Stress Disorder involves high levels of COVID Stress symptoms and severe functional impairment resulting from these symptoms. COVID Stress Disorder is proposed by Asmundson and Taylor as a distinct diagnostic category as COVID Stress symptoms and the associated impairment cannot be accounted for by existing mental disorder diagnoses.

On February 26, Minister of Health Patty Hajdu recommended that citizens stockpile food and medication, noting that it was "good to be prepared because things can change quickly [in any emergency]." The recommendation faced criticism from provincial politicians: Manitoba health minister Cameron Friesen and Ontario health minister Christine Elliott both felt that there was no need for such aggressive stockpiling, while Friesen also felt that there needed to be more coordination between the federal and provincial levels in terms of information regarding the outbreak. Conservative Party shadow minister Matt Jeneroux opined that the suggestion incited concern and was lacking in transparency. Health Canada's website recommended against such bulk purchases (as to not strain supply chains), and explained that having supplies on hand was to "ensure you do not need to leave your home at the peak of the outbreak or if you become ill."

==== March ====
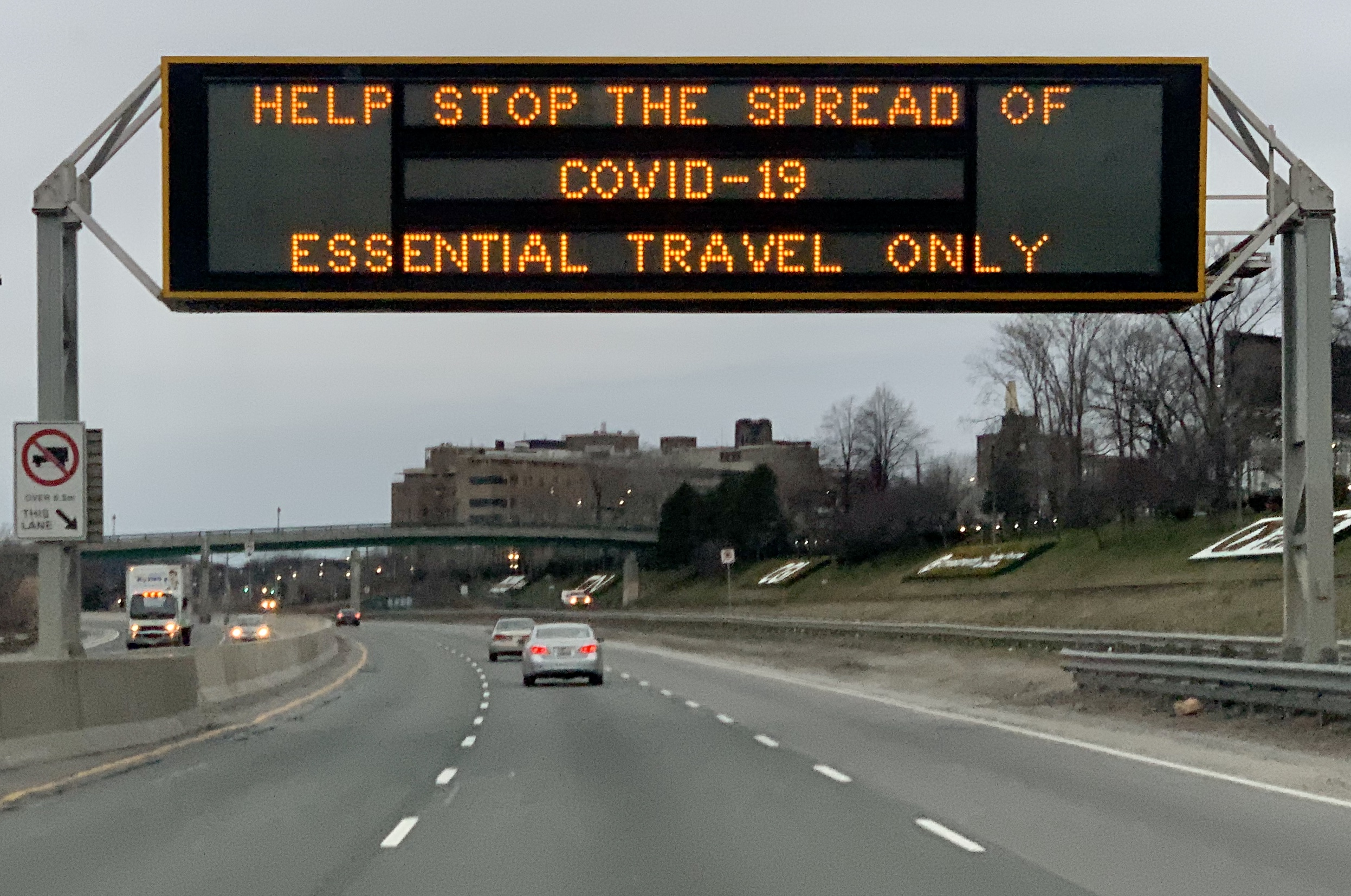
A highway sign on the Gardiner Expressway in Toronto discouraging non-essential travel

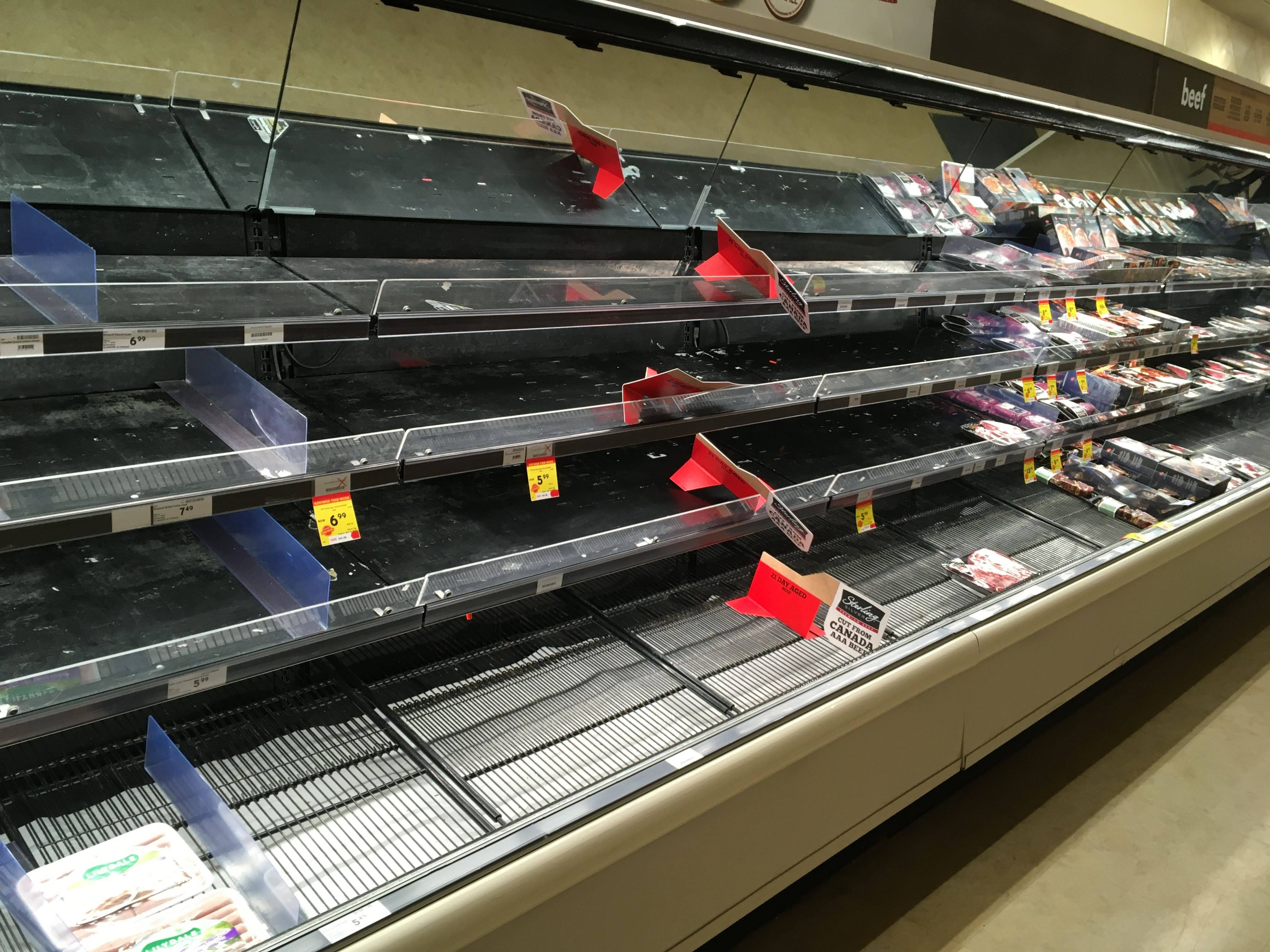
Shelves void of meat in a Regina supermarket as a result of panic buying

On March 4, 2020, Trudeau announced his creation of the Cabinet Committee on the federal response to the coronavirus disease, chaired by Chrystia Freeland, "to limit the spread of the virus" and to protect "the health and safety of all Canadians".

Minister of Health Patty Hajdu announced on March 6 that the federal government would offer $27 million in funding to 47 research groups at 19 universities to develop means of managing the outbreak. Minister of Finance Bill Morneau stated that the next federal budget would include measures in response to the outbreak, including an increase to the risk adjustment provision.

On March 8, Minister of Foreign Affairs François-Philippe Champagne stated that at the request of the U.S. government, Canada had chartered a EuroAtlantic passenger airplane to evacuate the 237 citizens that were still aboard the cruise ship Grand Princess. They were quarantined at CFB Trenton for two weeks when the plane landed on March 10.

Member of Parliament Anthony Housefather announced on March 9 that he was undergoing self-isolation as a precautionary measure due to possible contact with a person at an American Israel Public Affairs Committee (AIPAC) conference in Washington. The next day, Minister of Natural Resources Seamus O'Regan stated that he was also in self-isolation while awaiting the results of a coronavirus test. He had seen a doctor regarding a "persistent" head cold, who recommended testing, but was "not aware of contacting anyone infected". The test came back negative.

On March 11, Prime Minister Justin Trudeau announced a $1 billion response fund, including $500 million to go to provinces and territories, a $50 million contribution to the World Health Organization and an additional $275 million to fund COVID-19 research in Canada. Minister of Economic Development and Official Languages Mélanie Joly stated that she had been discussing means of mitigating the outbreak's impact on the air travel industry.

On March 11, the World Health Organization declared the virus to be the cause of a worldwide COVID-19 pandemic.

On March 12, after returning from a speaking engagement in London, England, Trudeau's wife Sophie Grégoire Trudeau tested positive for COVID-19. She and the Prime Minister went into self-isolation. The staff member is now thought to be Canada's first case of community transmission. The Toronto Stock Exchange tumbles 1770 points.

On March 13, Trudeau announced that the federal government was preparing a stimulus package to address those affected by the pandemic.

Also on March 13, Parliament agreed unanimously to shut its doors for five weeks (pursuant to Standing Order 28) because of COVID-19.

On March 16, Trudeau announced that new entry restrictions would be implemented shortly after midnight ET on March 18, restricting entry into the country to Americans and Canadian citizens and permanent residents and their families and flight crew members who are not displaying symptoms of covid-19. All people arriving were asked to self-isolate for 14 days. Most international flights were routed to Canada's an arbitrary selection of four airports (YVR, YYC, YYZ, and YUL) in order "to enhance screening measures". Minister of Foreign Affairs François-Philippe Champagne also announced that for citizens who are still abroad, the country would provide emergency loans of up to $5,000 to cover travel costs or basic needs until they are able to return.

The border closure led to a million Canadians returning home over the next week. Passengers from East Asian countries wore masks on their flights, but those arriving from Europe did not. Masks were not even recommended. There were no temperature checks. People were packed in close at airport waiting areas. Hand sanitizer dispensers had not been installed. Not everyone received the pamphlets instructing them to self-isolate for 14 days.

On March 17, Ontario Premier Doug Ford declared a state of emergency, calling for the closure of indoor recreation facilities, restaurants, libraries, theatres and concert halls.

On March 18, Donald Trump and Justin Trudeau announced that the Canada-U.S. border would close to non-essential travel. People entering Canada would be asked to self-isolate for 14 days. Family of Canadian citizens, students and foreign workers with visas would be allowed to enter. Truckers and flight crews carrying essential goods did not need to self-isolate.

Theresa Tam, Chief Public Health Officer of Canada and head of the Public Health Agency of Canada (PHAC), said on March 19 that Canada would not know for two or three weeks if country-wide social distancing efforts have curbed the spread of COVID-19.

On March 24, 35 members of parliament met in order to discuss Bill C-13, the COVID-19 Emergency Response Act. To maintain social distancing in the face of the highly contagious respiratory illness, only 35 of the 338 members of the House of Commons convened to debate the legislation. The Commons agreed "to see the application of Standing Order 17 (sic) suspended for the current sitting to allow (its) members the practice of social distancing."

Also on March 24, a small number of MPs from each party met in the House of Commons to vote on an $82-billion emergency spending legislation, known as Bill C-13. The passage of the bill was stalled due to the federal government's proposed clauses that gave the finance minister the right to spend money and raise taxes without the approval of Parliament until December 31, 2021. After criticism from the Official Opposition over the minority government's "power grab" which was considered undemocratic, a revised bill was agreed upon the next day that would permit the government six months of special spending powers until September 30, 2020, with oversight from a Parliamentary committee. The House of Commons' Health and Finance committees began holding weekly virtual meetings during the pandemic.

Meanwhile, Dr. Theresa Tam was quoted as saying regarding Canadians' need to wear face masks: "most people haven't learned how to use masks" and "there is no need to use a mask for well people."

On March 28, Sophie Grégoire Trudeau announced her full recovery and thanked her well-wishers via social media.

Unemployment figures for March showed the economy had shed 1,000,000 jobs, pushing the official jobless rate to 7.8 percent.

==== April ====
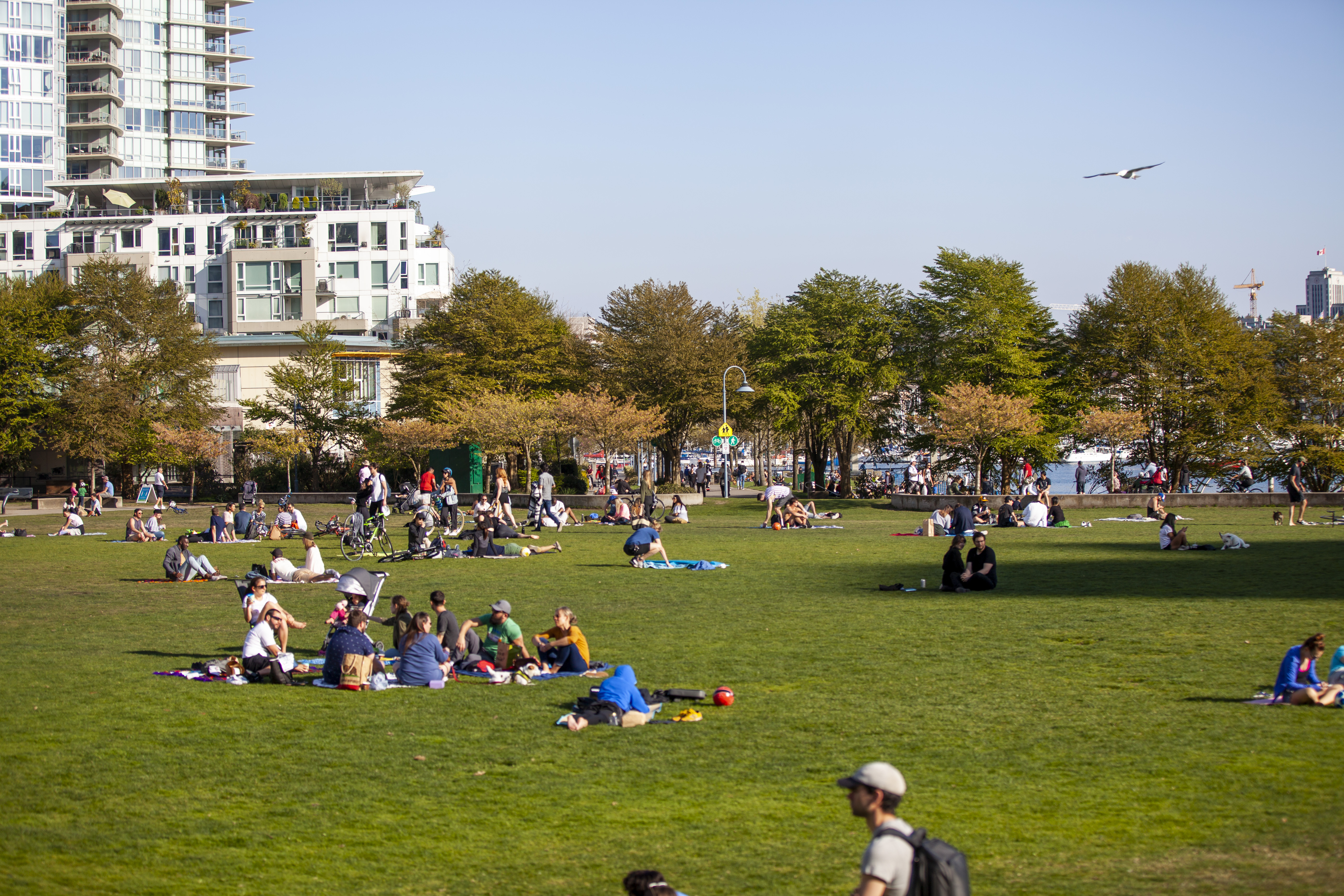
Vancouver, British Columbia during the COVID-19 pandemic on April 19.

On April 2, Trudeau said that he foresaw the expiry of the COVID-19 crisis to occur only in July.

On April 2, American President Donald Trump slammed 3M after invoking the US Defense Production Act of 1950 to get the company to produce N95 respirators and on April 3, Canadian officials protested a move by Trump to block 3M's export of N95 masks for use by doctors and nurses as COVID-19 cases were projected to soar in Ontario and Quebec. Deputy Prime Minister Chrystia Freeland said Canada would "do whatever it takes to defend the national interest." On April 6, the Trump administration agreed to a deal with the 3M to import more than 166 million respirators from China over the next three months and allow 3M to continue exporting its US made respirators to Canada.

On April 5, Queen Elizabeth addressed the Commonwealth in a televised broadcast, in which she asked people to "take comfort that while we may have more still to endure, better days will return". She added, "we will be with our friends again; we will be with our families again; we will meet again".

On April 6, Trudeau introduced extra aid for the Canada Emergency Response Benefit (CERB), saying "there are groups of people who aren't benefiting from [it] who probably should."

Also on April 6, Theresa Tam, the CPHO of Canada, noted that people with COVID-19 may be contagious even if they are pre-symptomatic or asymptomatic. She advised the use of a "non-medical face mask when shopping or using public transit" because "A non-medical mask can reduce the chance of your respiratory droplets coming into contact with others or land[ing] on surfaces". Tam offered advice on how to use "a cotton shirt combined with rubber bands" to create a DIY non-medical face mask.

On April 7, Trudeau brought up the topic of masks, where he said, "If people want to wear a mask, that is okay. It protects others more than it protects you, because it prevents you from breathing or... or... speaking, uh... 'moistly' on them." He immediately regrets his word choice and says, "Ugh, what a terrible image." The unusual word choice has led the creation of a remix song, "Speaking Moistly", based on the speech.

On April 9, the federal government released modelling that, even with strong public health measures, showed between 11,000 and 22,000 deaths over the course of the pandemic, with that number being closer to 300,000 deaths if no measures had been taken. Trudeau warned that "normality as it was before will not come back full-on until we get a vaccine for this", and that residents would "have to remain vigilant for at least a year." The same day, Trudeau sent a letter to the provincial and territorial premiers to consult about invoking the Emergencies Act. While consultation with the provinces is a required step before the Act can be triggered, the Prime Minister's Office said there was no present plan to enact it and that doing so remained a last resort. On a conference call between Trudeau and the premiers later that day, the premiers communicated their unanimous opposition to invoking the Act.

On April 10, the RCMP disclosed it has been asked to enforce the Quarantine Act, 2005. Penalties for violations can include a fine of up to $750,000 and imprisonment for six months. One reporter said that the RCMP "could enter homes to enforce Quarantine Act orders if Canadians don't self-isolate... [and] will do physical checks to enforce it." It was reported that the Canadian Forces Intelligence Command Medical Intelligence Cell (MEDINT) has submitted reports on the outbreak in Wuhan since January 2020.

On April 11, Parliament re-convened to pass Bill C-14: COVID-19 Emergency Response Act, No. 2, and thereby adopt the CEWS. As with the previous sitting on March 24, 35 MPs stood in for the full complement of 338 members due to the need for COVID-19 social distancing. Government briefing notes detailed "a bureaucracy reluctant to put inbound China passengers in mandatory quarantine or close borders to arrivals from other (COVID-19) hotspots." Yves-François Blanchet supported Trudeau when he "raised health and safety concerns over holding regular meetings (in order) to respect physical distancing". All that was needed to debate and to pass the bill to spend $73 billion were five hours.

On April 15, Trudeau warned against premature reopening of the economy, stating that "in order to get to that point, we need to continue doing what we are doing now for many more weeks".

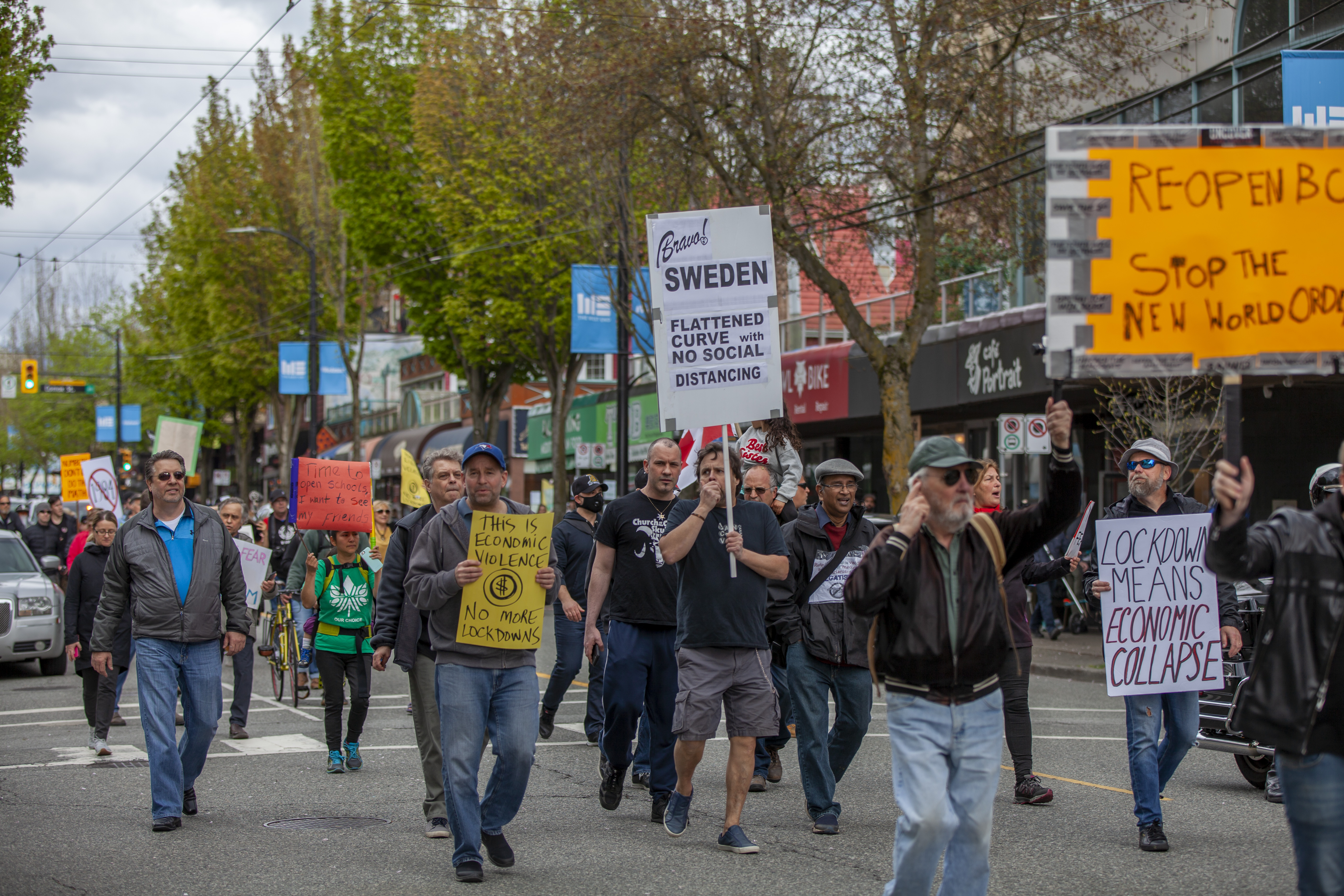
Anti-lockdown protest in Vancouver on April 26.

Catherine McKenna announced on April 16 that the Ministry of Infrastructure and Communities sought shovel-ready infrastructure projects to receive in the 2020 construction season some "largely unspent" funds that had already been budgeted.

On April 20, Parliament's temporary suspension for five weeks expired and it voted to sit only once weekly on Wednesdays.

On April 28, it was revealed that "79 percent of all deaths in the country" were to that date connected with "long-term care and seniors' homes."

On April 30, the Parliamentary Budget Officer warned that the Federal deficit for fiscal year 2020 could be in excess of $252 billion.

==== May ====
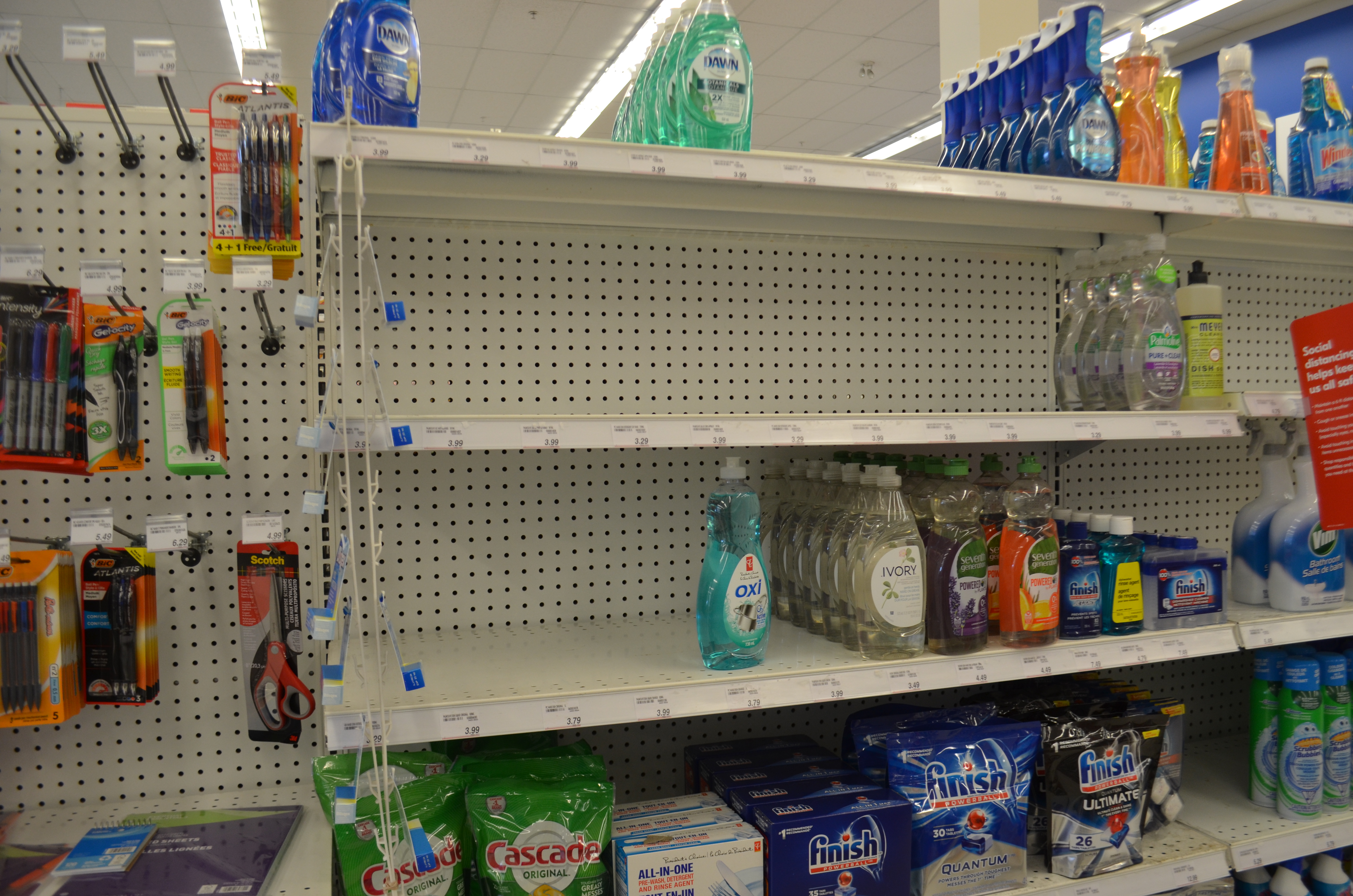
Shelves void of disinfectant and sanitizer in a Canadian supermarket.

On May 1, 2020, royal assent was granted to Bill C-15, to implement the Canada Emergency Student Benefit (CESB), after a cursory one-day consideration by 35 MPs. It established a subsidy programme for secondary school graduates and post-secondary students. Students who cannot find employment or are unable to work due to the COVID-19 pandemic are eligible for CA$1,250 per month from May through August 2020.

On May 4, Trudeau discouraged Canadians from displaying complacency due to the lifting of economic restrictions by provinces, emphasizing that it was "extremely important" for citizens to continue practicing social distancing and personal hygiene to prevent the spread, and not go out "unless you absolutely have to". He explained that although the country was on a "positive trajectory", "we are not out of the woods, however, and it requires us to continue to remain attentive and vigilant and following the instructions set out by our public health officials."

On May 5, the Canadian red meat industry was granted access to federal COVID emergency subsidies.

By May 8, 60 percent of COVID-19 fatalities were in Quebec, which has around 20 percent of the nation's population. Montreal was called "the epicentre of the pandemic in Canada."

On May 11, Trudeau, Morneau and Bains in a press conference said that "a bridge financing facility for large employers that need help to get through the economic downturn caused by the coronavirus." One stated goal was "to avoid bankruptcies of otherwise viable firms wherever possible... Companies that use the lending facility will have to commit to respect collective bargaining agreements, protecting workers' pensions, and support national climate goals. Rules on access to the money will place limits on dividends, share buy-backs and executive pay." The Large Employer Emergency Financing Facility (LEEFF) will only target companies with annual revenues in excess of $300 million.

On May 12, Parliamentary Budget Officer (PBO) Yves Giroux raised the possibility that the federal debt "will hit $1 trillion because of pandemic relief spending." Giroux said it was possible that pandemic programs could cost "more than what the entire federal government spent last year on everything", roughly $338 billion. Also on May 12, it was announced by Minister of International Development Karina Gould that $600 million would be contributed by the taxpayer to GAVI, "a vaccine alliance that improves vaccine access for vulnerable children around the world."

Also on May 12, Health Canada issued a press release with the announcement that the CCITF serological test would be administered to one million Canadians over the next two years. The government has selected DiaSorin to manufacture the tests.

On May 14, Lufthansa Group announced it would resume flights between Toronto and Frankfurt as of June 3.

On May 15, Conservative leader Andrew Scheer told a press conference that the Conservative caucus wanted Parliament to resume sitting as normal on May 25 and desired to withhold their consent to the 35-day rolling adjournment that prevents the regular operation of Parliament. Scheer observed that "Elected members of Parliament come here to be a voice for their constituents." Because all-party consent is required to suspend the animation of Parliament, it will need to resume sitting.

On May 19, during a press conference with Justin Trudeau and Theresa Tam that the 20th week of 2020 versus the same figures in 2019 saw a drop of 88 percent in land border crossers, and a 98 percent drop in international air travel. The following day CPHO Tam reversed her decision from March on the wearing of masks and began asking Canadians to start wearing masks.

On May 21, the Canadian Armed Forces, who had been tasked previously in Operation LASER with care for the senior citizens in the Long-Term Care Facilities of Ontario and Quebec had potentially been victimised by a COVID-19 SSEV. The disease affected 25 soldiers as of this date, but neither the CAF nor the DND would divulge details.

On May 25, Parliamentary Secretary to the Minister of National Defence Anita Vandenbeld disclosed to the third sitting of the resumed 43rd Canadian Parliament that 36 soldiers from Operation LASER had been infected with COVID-19 disease. Vandenbeld corrected for the record Cheryl Gallant who had been under the mistaken impression that only 28 soldiers (12 positives in Ontario and 16 in Quebec) had been infected. Also on that day, Doug Ford announced that Ontario had a heat map of the outbreak locations, and that Brampton, north Etobicoke, Scarborough, Peel Region, Windsor and Essex County were "lighting up like Christmas trees". It was disclosed that Toronto-area public health units account for 65% of cases in Ontario.

==== June ====
On June 18, 2020, Canada reached 100,000 coronavirus cases, a little over three months since the suspension of Parliament for the same reason. A CBC News tally of reported deaths from COVID-19 on the same date was 8,348.

On June 24, Fitch Ratings Inc., a bond ratings agency, downgraded Canada's credit rating from triple-A to double-A-plus. The government had sported a triple-A credit rating with Fitch since the Martin government.

On June 25, former Clerk of the Privy Council of Canada Michael Wernick predicted that one of the side-effects of the COVID-19 pandemic would be the shrinkage of the number of paid civil servants of Canada. He drew analogies to the debt problem in the 1980s which led "to a 1995 austerity budget that saw 45,000 public service jobs slashed, the elimination of 73 federal agencies, a 21 percent reduction in foreign aid and the privatization of Canadian National Railways." Wernick said that:

One of the consequences of all this work from home experience is that ministers will figure out it really doesn't matter where those public servants are, they can be brought together for work teams and projects... The federal service, it will be smaller, it will be less concentrated in Ottawa.

==== July ====
The western provinces reported a surge in cases around the middle of July. Ontario reported 203 new cases in one day, Quebec reported 180 new cases in 24 hours, Alberta reported 368 new cases over the weekend, and Saskatchewan reported 120 in a previous week.

==== August ====
On August 26, a 72 year-old New Zealand mariner named Peter Smith was threatened by Transport Canada as his Kiwi Roa sailed through the Northwest Passage, because the government "prohibited pleasure craft from operating in Arctic waters" from June 1 "to better protect Arctic communities" from COVID-19. Smith opined that the bureaucracy is "out of control and gone mad."

==== September ====
In early September, federal Minister of Transport Marc Garneau remarked that airline passengers face a $1000 penalty fine if they refuse to wear a mask. The penalty was imposed in separate incidents (in June then July) on the first two passengers in September in order for others to reflect on the punished behaviour. Face coverings have been mandatory on flights since April 20. "Federal transport officials" were charged with issuing the fines "under the federal order". The same week, WestJet announced a new policy that include a 12-month long ban for passengers who ignored aircrew instructions to don masks. The PHAC stated that 378 domestic and 595 international flights between March 2 and August 24 had travellers on board who may have had the disease during their trip.

On September 7, Hajdu ordered an "independent review" of the "early warning system" after media reports in July documented how the Global Public Health Intelligence Network (GPHIN), formerly a PHAC subgroup, was deemed by a senior bureaucrat to be unnecessary.

On September 18, Conservative Party leader Erin O'Toole tested positive for COVID-19, after a staffer in his office tested positive. The same day, Bloc Quebecois leader Yves-François Blanchet also tested positive.

On September 23, in a speech from the throne, Prime Minister Trudeau declared Canada was currently in the second wave of COVID-19.

==== October ====
On October 4, a West African man who had travelled onwards from Toronto to Halifax and thence to Deer Lake, Newfoundland died of COVID-19. Health officials decided to raise the alarm and request that passengers on the final leg of his flight "self-monitor for symptoms".

On October 19, Air Transat announced the closure of its Vancouver base and laid off half of its remaining flight attendants. Prior to the pandemic, the airline had employed 2,000 flight attendants. As of November, it planned to employ 117 flight attendants.

On October 20, aviation workers gathered to protest at Parliament Hill.

On October 22, the European Union cancelled the covid travel corridor that allowed Canadians to enter any European territory without quarantine lockdown. In June 2020, Canada had been as one of 14 countries that were allowed to enter by the EU. The reversal of status was caused by the resurgence in coronavirus cases that Canada began to experience in late October.

On October 23, apparel retailer Le Chateau, which had 123 locations across Canada and employed 1,400 people, announced it was filing for CCAA protection, blaming COVID-19.

==== November ====
On November 6, Nunavut confirmed its first case in Sanikiluaq.

On November 10, as Manitoba went under lockdown, Trudeau "urged premiers and mayors across the country not to loosen restrictions for the sake of the economy and suggested localized shutdowns are needed in areas seeing a surge in cases", saying

I would hope that no leader in our country is easing public-health vigilance because they feel pressure not to shut down businesses or slow down our economy.

On November 23, a report said that the Atlantic Bubble was defunct under pressure from increasing COVID-19 sightings.

On November 29, Public Safety Minister Bill Blair and Health Minister Patty Hajdu extended the ban on international travellers who had non-essential purposes. The rules were first imposed in March, and were to be extended until January 21, 2021 "for travellers entering Canada from a country other than the United States. Among the rules is a requirement for anyone entering the country to self-isolate for 14 days upon entry into Canada."

==== December ====
Prime Minister Justin Trudeau announced on December 7, that the first of 249,000 doses out of a total of 4 million doses of the Pfizer–BioNTech COVID-19 vaccine will arrive before the end of the year. On December 9, the vaccine was approved by Health Canada for use.

On December 14, the first tranche of vaccinations began across the nation. Some sources initially indicated that Anita Quidangen, a personal support worker from Toronto, who was the first Canadian to receive a dose, but later it was determined that it was Gisèle Lévesque, an 89-year-old resident of a long-term care home in Quebec City who was the first.

Starting with December 21, Canada halted flights from the United Kingdom due to concerns over the Variant of Concern 202012/01 variant of SARS-CoV-2.

On December 23, Health Canada approved the mRNA-1273 COVID-19 vaccine developed by Moderna. Canada will receive up to 168,000 doses of the vaccine by the end of 2020, the first tranche of a total 40 million doses currently ordered for 2021.

On December 30, the Federal government announced all air travellers entering the country from outside of Canada must now provide a COVID-negative PCR test within 72 hours of boarding their flight into the country effective January 7, 2021. This is in addition to the mandatory 14-day quarantine mandated by the Quarantine Act. Additional rules also mean the traveller will have to spend time in a Federal facility if officers find their self-isolation plans unsatisfactory.

=== 2021 ===
==== January ====
On January 7, the new rule for air travellers requiring a negative PCR test before boarding their departing flight to Canada came into effect. Travellers caught unaware of the new rules were reportedly turned away from their flights in countries like Cuba and Mexico. The test requirement came at the end of the travel ban on flights from U.K., amid fears of the spread of Variant of Concern 202012/01 variant of COVID-19. WestJet was highly critical of the new rules, citing the lack of time they had to prepare for the new requirements. Despite the new rules, passengers on 20 separate flights arriving from warmer climates (including United States, Barbados, Aruba, Mexico, Panama and the Dominican Republic) over the winter holidays were exposed to the virus before the new rules came into effect. Following the new rules, on January 21, 2021, Transport Minister Omar Alghabra announced at least 50,000 flights were cancelled in Canada.

On January 8, amid rising cases across the country, Prime Minister Trudeau promised a speed up of the vaccine rollout which has been criticized as being slow moving. The federal government supplies the vaccine doses, however it is up to the individual provinces to administer them. Reports of Canadian snowbirds travelling to the United States for quicker access to the vaccine have emerged. States like Florida and Arizona have lowered their requirements to include anyone over the age of 65 to have access to free vaccination.

In mid-January, Pfizer notified Canada of its intentions to retool its manufacturing plant in Belgium in order to meet world-wide demands for the vaccine. Initially Canada was told it would receive less doses than anticipated, however, this was later changed to a significant drop in delivered doses and no doses the week of January 25. Provinces who have nearly depleted their current vaccine stock have set back dates to administer second doses of the vaccines to those who have already received their first, with uncertain medical knowledge lengthening the time of said second dose would affect efficacy.

On January 29, Prime Minister Trudeau announced new national travel restrictions, including the suspension of flights by major airlines to and from the Caribbean and Mexico beginning January 31 until April 30. In the coming weeks, new foreign flights must only land in Vancouver, Calgary, Toronto or Montreal and travellers must undergo a COVID-19 PCR test and isolate in an approved hotel while awaiting results at the traveller's expense.

Also on January 29, Moderna announced delays of 20 to 25 percent delivery of product to the country for the month of February.

==== February ====
On February 2, 2021, Trudeau announced a deal with Novavax to produce COVID-19 vaccines at the Biologics Manufacturing Centre, making it the first to be produced domestically. The Novavax COVID-19 vaccine is currently awaiting approval by Health Canada. This is the first deal signed by Canada that allows a domestic manufacturing of a foreign vaccine. The contract with Novavax is for 52 million doses of the vaccine. Following the recommendations of the COVID-19 Vaccine and Therapeutics Task Forces and COVID-19 Joint Biomanufacturing Subcommittee, the federal government announced investment in two biomanufacturing companies—Vancouver-based Precision NanoSystems Incorporated (PNI) and Markham, Ontario-based Edesa Biotech Inc. (Edesa). PNI, biotechnology company, will receive up to $25.1 million to build a "$50.2 million biomanufacturing centre to produce vaccines and therapeutics for the prevention and treatment of diseases such as infectious diseases, rare diseases, cancer and other areas of unmet need". Edesa will receive up to $14 million to Edesa Biotech to "advance work on a monoclonal antibody therapy for acute respiratory distress syndrome, which is the leading cause of COVID-19 deaths.

On February 3, COVAX published the country-by-country vaccine distribution forecast to COVAX participants—Canada will receive 1,903,200 doses of the Oxford–AstraZeneca vaccine by the end of the first half of 2021.

On February 9, Prime Minister Trudeau announced a negative PCR test will be required within 72 hours of entering Canada through the land border with the United States. The change will come into effect on February 15.

On February 12, the Canadian government announced additional details about the incoming international travel measures first announced in late January. Effective February 22, all arriving international travellers will have to present a negative PCR COVID-19 test 72 hours before boarding their departing flight, take a PCR test on arrival in Canada and quarantine for three days at a supervised hotel for three days awaiting the results of their test at their own expense. Additionally they will be required to take a third PCR COVID-19 test at the end of their 14-day quarantine at home. Essential workers such as transport workers continue to be exempt from mandatory testing and quarantine.

On February 26, Health Canada approved the Oxford-AstraZeneca COVID-19 vaccine for use.

==== March ====
On March 5, Health Canada approved the Janssen COVID-19 vaccine for use. The vaccine is the only approved vaccine to currently require one shot. Also on March 5, Pfizer announced an increase in vaccine delivery for the nation, adding an additional 1.5 million vaccines to its schedule by the end of March for a total of 8 million vaccines to be delivered.

==== April ====
By April 11, influenced by major outbreaks of variants of concern in multiple provinces (including Alberta, B.C., Ontario, and Saskatchewan), and slow availability of vaccines, new cases per-million exceeded those of the United States.

==== November ====
On November 28, the Government of Ontario announces that two cases of the Omicron variant (later named BA.1) have been found in Ottawa.

=== 2022 ===
==== May ====
On May 3, the Public Health Agency of Canada reported one case of the Omicron BA.5 variant had been found in Canada.

==== July ====
By July 2, the Omicron BA.5 variant had become the dominant variant in Ontario.

== See also ==
- 2020 in Canada
- COVID-19 pandemic by country
- COVID-19 pandemic in North America
- National responses to the COVID-19 pandemic
- Healthcare in Canada
