= Responses to the COVID-19 pandemic in March 2021 =

Aspect of viral disease pandemic

This article documents the chronology of the response to the COVID-19 pandemic in March 2021, which originated in Wuhan, China in December 2019. Some developments may become known or fully understood only in retrospect. Reporting on this pandemic began in December 2019.

== Reactions and measures in South and Southeast Asia ==
=== 1 March ===
- In Malaysia, preschoolers, Year One, and Year Two primary pupils resume face-to-face classes as part of a phased reopening of schools.

=== 2 March ===
- Malaysian Senior Minister Ismail Sabri Yaakob announced that the federal territory of Kuala Lumpur and the states of Selangor, Johor, and Penang would enter the Conditional Movement Control Order (CMCO).

=== 4 March ===
- The Malaysian Special Committee on Ensuring Access to Covid-19 Vaccine Supply (JKJAV) confirmed that 80,336 Malaysians had received their first COVID-19 vaccine dose.

=== 11 March ===
- The Malaysian Government announced the Emergency (Essential Powers) (No.2) Ordinance 2021, which states that those who spread "fake news" "by any means, with intent to cause, or which is likely to cause fear or alarm to the public" could face a fine of RM100,000 or three years imprisonment or both.

=== 24 March ===
- The Singaporean and Malaysian Foreign Ministers Vivian Balakrishnan and Hishamuddin Hussein have confirmed that the two governments will be working together to recognise each other's COVID-19 vaccine certificates with the goal of restoring cross-border travel in the future.

=== 29 March ===
The Malaysian Science, Technology and Innovation Minister Khairy Jamaluddin confirmed that the second phase of the country's national immunisation programme would begin on 19 April 2021, focusing on the elderly, disabled and those with comorbidities.

== Reactions and measures in the Western Pacific ==
=== 1 March ===
- In New Zealand, 28 port workers at Tauranga received their first dose of the Pfizer-BioNTech COVID-19 vaccine, becoming the second group of essential workers to be vaccinated.

=== 5 March ===
- New Zealand Prime Minister Jacinda Ardern has announced that Auckland will move to Alert Level 2 lockdown from Alert Level 3 at 6 am on 7 March. Meanwhile, the rest of New Zealand will move to Alert Level 1 at 6am on 7 March.

=== 7 March ===
- Fiji receives 12,000 doses of the Oxford–AstraZeneca COVID-19 vaccine through the World Health Organization's COVAX initiative.

=== 8 March ===
- New Zealand Prime Minister Jacinda Ardern confirmed that the New Zealand Government had secured an additional 8.5 million doses of the Pfizer-BioNTech COVID-19 vaccine.

=== 12 March ===
- In New Zealand, Auckland moved back to Alert level 1 on midday, lifting social distancing and public gathering restrictions in the city.

=== 13 March ===
- New Zealand Prime Minister Jacinda Ardern and Premier of Niue Dalton Tagelagi announced that travellers from Niue can resume quarantine free travel into New Zealand from 24 March 2021.

=== 20 March ===
- The International Olympic Committee, International Paralympic Committee, Tokyo Organising Committee of the Olympic and Paralympic Games and Government of Japan announced that international spectators are banned from entering Japan in the 2020 Summer Olympics and Paralympics to prevent the risk of COVID-19 infection.

== See also ==
- Timeline of the COVID-19 pandemic in March 2021
- Responses to the COVID-19 pandemic
