= Timeline of the COVID-19 pandemic in 2019 =

Aspect of viral disease pandemic

This article documents the chronology and epidemiology of SARS-CoV-2 in 2019, the virus that causes coronavirus disease 2019 (COVID-19) and is responsible for the COVID-19 pandemic. The first human cases of COVID-19 known to have been identified were in Wuhan, Hubei, China, in December 2019. It marked the beginning of the 2019–2020 COVID-19 outbreak in mainland China.

== Unconfirmed reports of early cases ==
A September 2020 review noted the hypothetical possibility that the COVID-19 infection had already spread to Europe in 2019 by presumptive evidences including pneumonia case numbers and radiology in France and Italy in November and December. However, a subsequent retrospective surveillance report determined there was no evidence of SARS-CoV-2 circulation in Rome (Italy) during this period.

Some medical and environmental analyses in Italy, France, and the US found results which suggested the virus was circulating prior to December 2019 by several weeks. A WHO report states: "the study findings were not confirmed, methods used were not standardized, and serological assays may suffer from non-specific signals". It urges further investigation of these potential early events.

== November ==
According to an ABC news report, the American National Center for Medical Intelligence shared intelligence in late November, based on analysis of wire and computer intercepts and satellite images, regarding a potential respiratory disease in Wuhan. This was denied by the Pentagon. On 13 March 2020, the South China Morning Post reported that Chinese government records suggest that the first case of infection with COVID-19 could be traced back to a 55-year-old Hubei resident on 17 November.

On 23 May 2021, The Wall Street Journal reported that newly disclosed U.S. intelligence obtained that three researchers working at the BSL-4 laboratory of the Wuhan Institute of Virology were hospitalized with COVID-like symptoms. The report added weight to calls for a broader probe into the theory that the COVID-19 virus could have escaped from a laboratory. However, a WHO report states "introduction through a laboratory incident was considered to be an extremely unlikely pathway". Since then, the head of the WHO COVID-19 origins investigative team, Peter Ben Embarek, has stated that the Chinese authorities exerted pressure on the WHO report conclusions, and that he in fact considers an infection via a researcher's field samples to be a "likely" scenario.

== 1 December ==
Symptoms of the index case, or patient zero, began on 1 December. The man had not been to the Huanan Seafood Wholesale Market. His family was unaffected, and no epidemiological link was found between him and the other laboratory-confirmed cases as of 2 January.

== 8 December ==
=== First hospitalizations ===
This was the onset of the first 41 people who were tested and later confirmed positive for COVID-19, as reported by the Wuhan City Health Committee and the WHO in 2020.

== 10 December ==
Symptoms of three more cases began on 10 December, which were later confirmed by laboratories. These patients are known because they became hospitalized on 16 December and thus sampled. Their results were confirmed two of these three had no direct exposure to the Huanan Seafood Wholesale Market, while the other did.

== 15-16 December ==
The fifth and sixth cases that were later confirmed by laboratories first felt symptoms on 15 December. Both patients had direct exposure to the Huanan Market.

The first documented COVID-19 hospital admissions worldwide were dated to 16 December 2019 in Wuhan.

== 24 December ==
An unresolved clinical case sparks off the first scientific involvement: a bronchoalveolar lavage fluid (BAL) sample was sent from Wuhan Central Hospital to Vision Medicals (广州微远基因科技) in Guangzhou, a private company specializing in metagenomic massive parallel sequencing analysis. According to the GenBank record, the sample was obtained 23 December, whereas Ren et al.,Chin Med J, 2020 sets the date to 24 December 2019.

== 27 December ==
=== First novel disease report ===
According to news reports in February 2020—Workers Daily, Global Times—at the Hubei Provincial Hospital of Integrated Chinese and Western Medicine and following the report from Doctor Zhang Jixian, the hospital immediately alerted the local CDC, Wuhan Jianghan Disease Prevention and Control Center, however, the report of 22 January 2020 from the Chinese CDC seems to claim this contact falling on 29 December.

== 28 December ==
=== First sequencing of genome ===
On 28 December 2019, Dr. Lili Ren, a virologist at the Peking Union Medical College in Beijing submitted a complete sequence of SARS-CoV-2 structure to GenBank. The sequence was never made public as it failed to include the annotations required for publication, and attempts by the NIH to contact Dr. Ren went unanswered.

== 29 December ==
On this day and the previous, three similar cases arrived at Hubei Provincial Hospital of Integrated Chinese and Western Medicine, all associated with the seafood market. The health authorities had been informed, and medical experts from Wuhan Jinyintan Hospital, "a hospital designated to treat infectious diseases" came to transfer six of the seven patients. Zhang Jixian took the further initiative to let doctors and nurses in the respiratory department wear face masks, and put out an order for 30 hospital coats of fine canvas. The administration at Hubei Provincial Hospital of Integrated Chinese and Western Medicine convened an interdepartmental panel of doctors, whose conclusions were the cases were unusual and required special attention, and also having learned of two similar cases in the city, decided to report their findings to the municipal and provincial health authorities, Wuhan Municipal Health Commission and Hubei Province Health Committee.

The Wuhan CDC staff found also additional patients with similar symptoms who were linked to the market. The Wuhan 'Center for Disease Control and Prevention' (CDC) is part of Chinese Center for Disease Control and Prevention.

== 30 December ==
Wuhan Central Hospital received a report from Beijing Boao Medical Laboratory stating that their sample (obtained 27 December) contained SARS coronavirus. At the time, the laboratory only obtained a short partial sequence, which was rapidly shared with Vision Medicals, so that Vision Medicals could confirm that the sequence was SARS-CoV-2, i.e., roughly identical to the one they obtained 3 days before, and relatively distant to the original SARS coronavirus.

Several doctors at Wuhan Central Hospital shared the test report on social media in discussions mainly aimed at colleagues. As referred to by Caixin Online, from the social media account of Li Wenliang, it is stated that there are seven cases of SARS at Wuhan Central Hospital, all connected to the Huanan Seafood Wholesale Market.

For Vision Medicals, too, these are hectic days (27–30 December) with the Chinese CDC requesting all results from Vision Medicals and from the Chinese Academy of Medical Science: "this was an urgent, secret and serious investigation".

=== First official messages ===
Wuhan Municipal Health Commission sent a hard-copy message to its affiliate institutions. containing guidelines in confronting a possible outbreak of infectious pneumonia. Two scanned copies also found their way, the same day, to the Weibo QQ service—a social media platform.

- Supervising doctors shall hold fast on discipline and create specialised team-units.
- General staff must be alert to the situation, especially keeping an eye out for patients with symptoms of infectious pneumonia.
- Statistical material must be gathered ongoingly and send to Wuhan Municipal Health Commission and Hubei Province Health Committee.
- Statistical material for the previous week, relating to patients with symptoms of infectious pneumonia, is to be sent to Wuhan Municipal Health Commission before 4 o'clock, this day.
- Without permission from authorized personnel, no one is allowed to spread information about the medical treatment.

=== First international alert ===
FluTrackers, an international disease tracking website established in 2006, was the first report reaching an international context on the situation in Wuhan on 30 December at 23:35:00 as recorded in the Internet Archive and reported by The Washington Post, Forbes, and CIDRAP. The ProMED reporting program, under auspice of the International Society for Infectious Diseases (ISID), reported on the situation in Wuhan. The full date is actually 30 December 23:59:00.

WHO may also have noticed the information coming out from Wuhan.

== 31 December ==
=== First public message ===
The Wuhan Municipal Health Commission released a briefing on its website about early signs of a pneumonia outbreak in the city. The message conveys the impression of alertness, by summarizing 30 December's orders to the city hospitals; emphasizing ongoing scientific and clinical investigations and to seek hospital care when having persistent fever while showing symptoms of pneumonia; as well advising the public to wear face masks and to avoid enclosed public places and crowded areas.

Cases in total: 27
Serious cases: 7
Recovering: 2
As of now: no fatalities, no healthcare-workers infected, no signs of human-to-human transmission, cause of pneumonia infection still under investigation

The message on pneumonia of unknown etiology was picked up by Chinese news agencies, including the state television CCTV, local news agencies (such as Hubei Daily), and social media (such as the Weibo account of CCTV People's Daily) said the exact cause remained unclear, and it would be premature to speculate. Through the Weibo account "YangShiXinWen", CCTV also sent an alert about the unknown virus, adding that a team of experts from the National Health Commission would arrive in Wuhan.

Some international agencies also picked up on the reports, including Reuters, Deutsche Welle, and the South China Morning Post.

Qu Shiqian, a vendor at the Huanan Seafood Wholesale Market, said government officials had disinfected the premises on 31 December and told stallholders to wear masks. Qu said he had learned of the pneumonia outbreak only from media reports. "Previously I thought they had flu", he said. "It should be not serious. We are fish traders. How can we get infected?"

=== Interregional and international responses ===
In response to the announcement from Wuhan, Hong Kong's Center for Health Protection tightened their inbound screening processes. They announced that various "surveillance measures at all boundary control points" have begun—including thermal imaging for checks on body temperature. The center appealed to the public to maintain hygiene, with detailed advice on washing hands and wearing a mask, and further precautions when traveling outside Hong Kong. Hong Kong's Secretary for Food and Health Sophia Chan announced "[any suspected cases] including the presentation of fever and acute respiratory illness or pneumonia, and travel history to Wuhan within 14 days before onset of symptoms, we will put the patients in isolation."

Tao Lina, a public health expert and former official with the Shanghai Center for Disease Control and Prevention, said, "I think we are [now] quite capable of killing it in the beginning phase, given China's disease control system, emergency handling capacity and clinical medicine support." No human-to-human infection had been reported so far and more pathological tests and investigations were underway, an official said.

The World Health Organization office in China picked up the media statement from the website of the Wuhan Municipal Health Commission on cases of viral pneumonia. The WHO China office then notified the WHO Western Pacific Regional Office about the notice from the Wuhan government.

The US CDC claimed to have "first learned of a 'cluster of 27 cases of pneumonia'" in Wuhan on this day.

The Taiwan Centers for Disease Control (CDC) implemented inspection measures for inbound flights from Wuhan. Deputy director Luo Yi-jun raised the alarm with his colleagues after reading about the outbreak on the PTT Bulletin Board System. Taiwan would end up having fewer than 500 total COVID-19 cases until September 2020.

== See also ==
- Timeline of the COVID-19 pandemic
