= FluTrackers =

Website and early warning system

- Website type: Internet forum
- Website: Official website
- Launched: 2006

FluTrackers is a website, online forum and early warning system which tracks and gathers information relating to a wide range of infectious diseases, including flu and assists in how to use it to inform the general public. It was co-founded by Sharon Sanders & Jeremy Walsh in 2006, initially to investigate seasonal influenza, novel influenza, and chikungunya. Later, it extended to include Ebola, Zika and drug resistant bacteria. In the first ten months of 2017, it received 18 million views.

At the end of December 2019, the site began communicating early information on the outbreak of atypical pneumonia in Wuhan, later known to be due to SARS-CoV-2, the virus responsible for the COVID-19 pandemic.
