= 2009 swine flu pandemic =

2009–2010 pandemic of swine influenza caused by H1N1 influenza virus

- 50,000+ confirmed cases 5,000–49,999 confirmed cases 500–4,999 confirmed cases 50–499 confirmed cases 5–49 confirmed cases 1–4 confirmed cases No confirmed cases

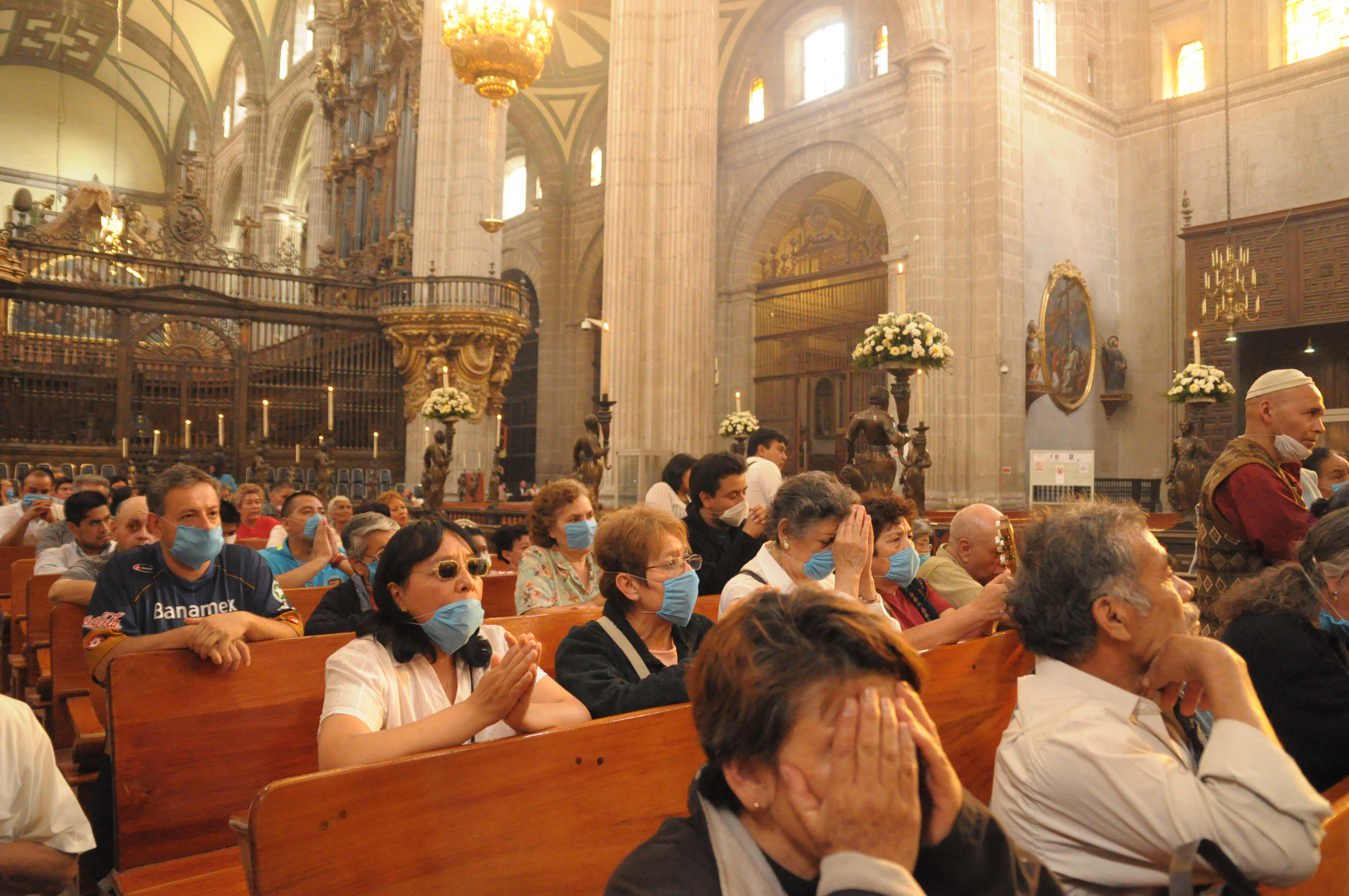
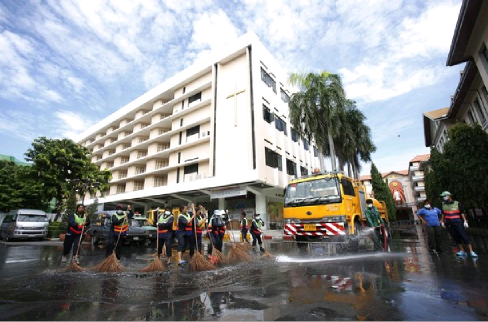
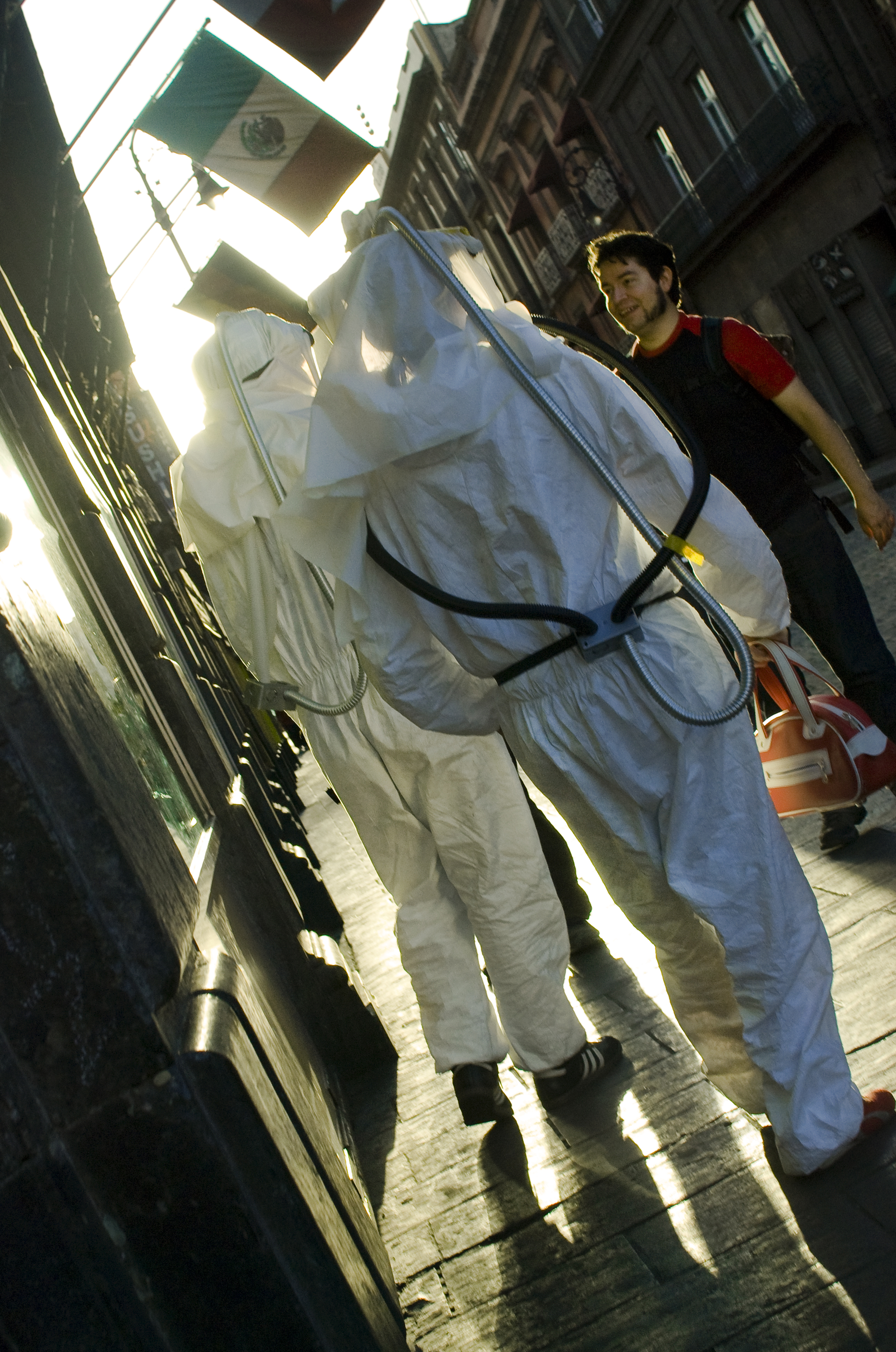
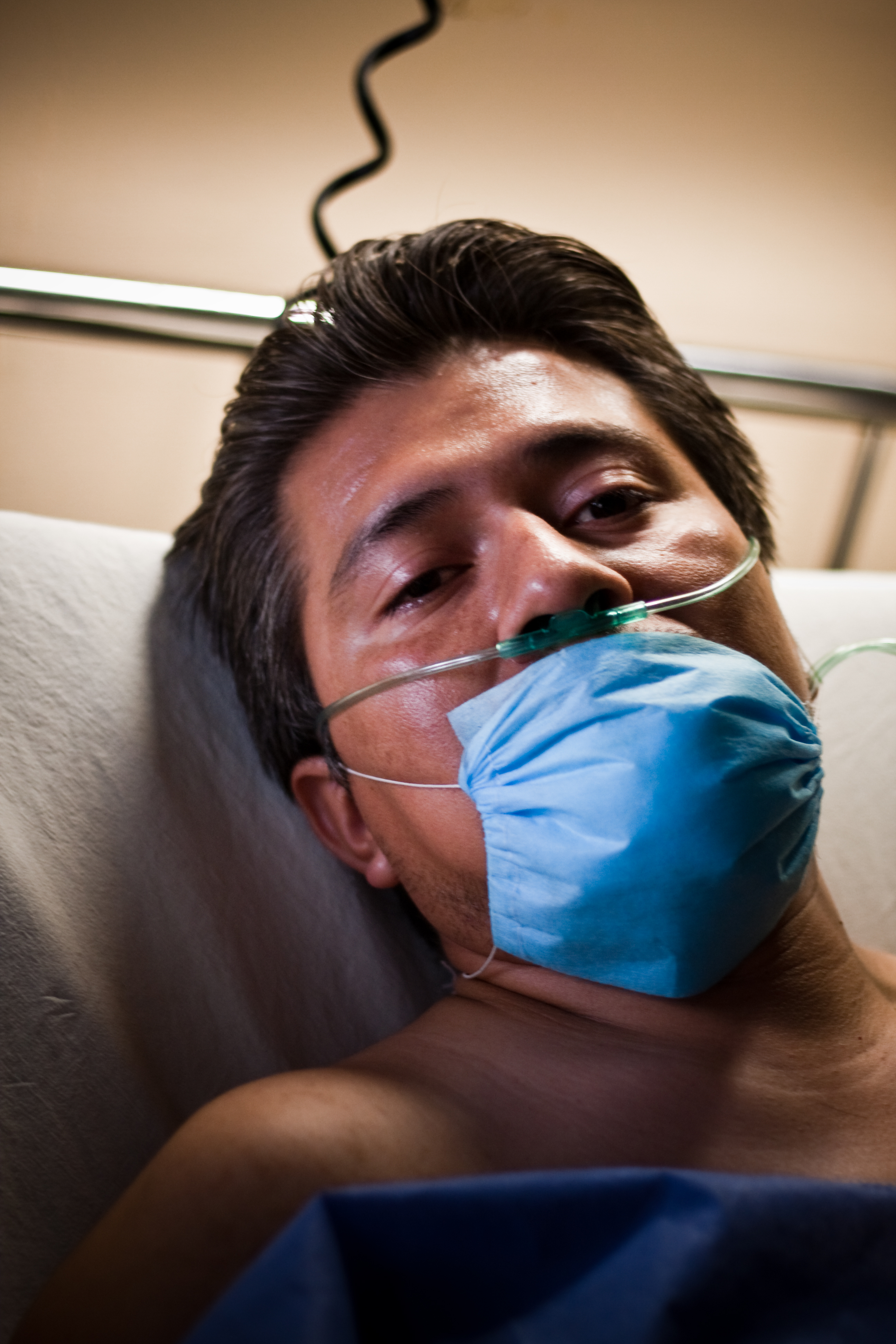
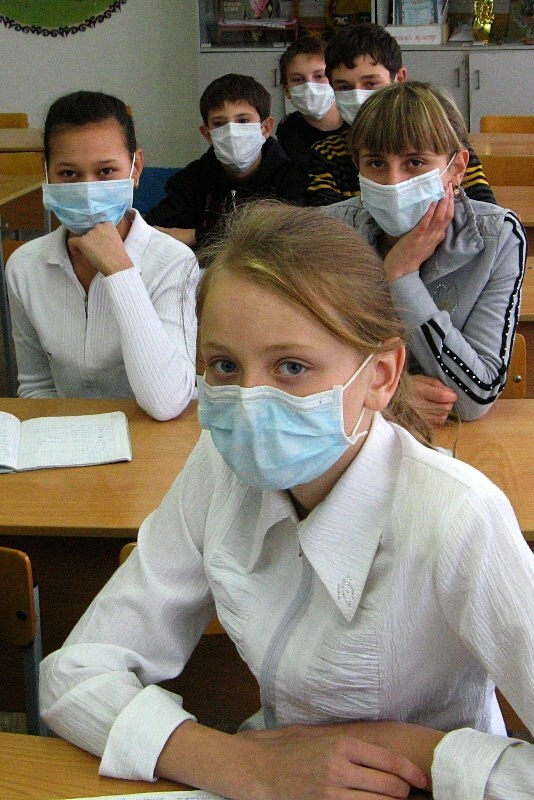
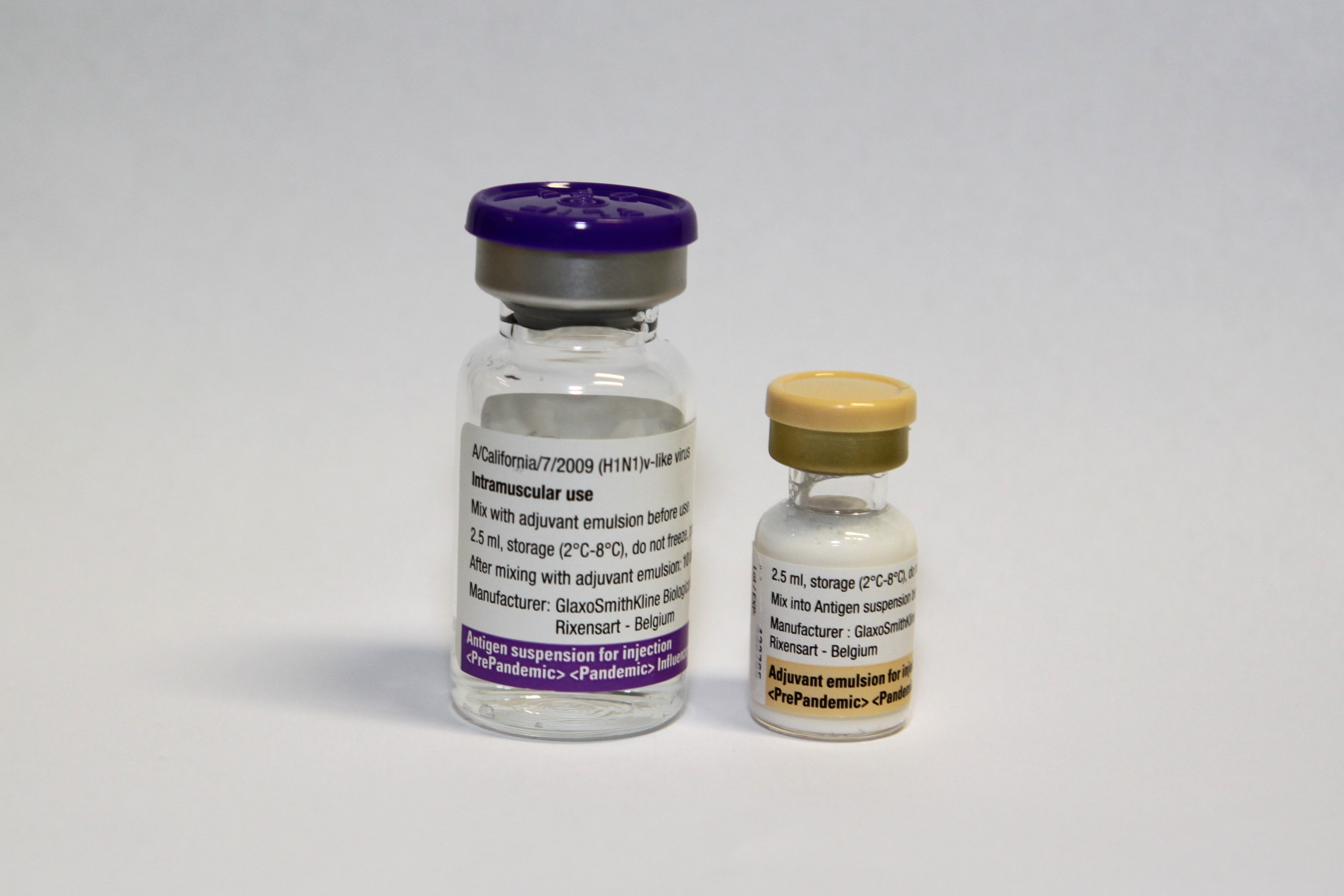
- Disease: Influenza
- Pathogen: Pandemic H1N1/09 virus
- Source: Pigs, likely indirectly
- Location: Worldwide
- First outbreak: North America
- Index case: Veracruz, Mexico
- Arrival date: September 2008
- Date: January 2009 – 10 August 2010
- Confirmed cases: 491,382 (lab-confirmed)
- Suspected cases: 700 million to 1.4 billion (estimate)
- Deaths: Lab confirmed deaths: 18,449 (reported to the WHO); Estimated excess death: 284,000

The 2009 swine flu pandemic, caused by the H1N1/swine flu/influenza virus and declared by the World Health Organization (WHO) from June 2009 to August 2010, was the third recent flu pandemic involving the H1N1 virus (the first being the 1918–1920 Spanish flu pandemic and the second being the 1977 Russian flu). The first identified human case was in La Gloria, Mexico, a rural town in Veracruz. The virus appeared to be a new strain of H1N1 that resulted from a previous triple reassortment of bird, swine, and human flu viruses which further combined with a Eurasian pig flu virus, leading to the term "swine flu".

Unlike most strains of influenza, the pandemic H1N1/09 virus did not disproportionately infect adults older than 60 years; this was an unusual and characteristic feature of the H1N1 pandemic. Even in the case of previously healthy people, a small percentage develop pneumonia or acute respiratory distress syndrome (ARDS). This manifests itself as increased breathing difficulty and typically occurs three to six days after the initial onset of flu symptoms. The pneumonia caused by the flu can be either direct viral pneumonia or a secondary bacterial pneumonia. A November 2009 New England Journal of Medicine article recommended that flu patients whose chest X-ray indicates pneumonia receive both antivirals and antibiotics. In particular, it is a warning sign if a child seems to be getting better and then relapses with high fever, as this relapse may be bacterial pneumonia.

Some studies estimated that the real number of cases including asymptomatic and mild cases could be 700 million to 1.4 billion people—or 11% to 21% of the global population of 6.8 billion at the time. The lower value of 700 million is more than the 500 million people estimated to have been infected by the Spanish flu pandemic. However, the Spanish flu infected approximately a third of the world population at the time, a much higher proportion.

The number of lab-confirmed deaths reported to the WHO is 18,449 and is widely considered a gross underestimate. The WHO collaborated with the US Centers for Disease Control and Prevention (CDC) and the Netherlands Institute for Health Services Research (NIVEL) to produce two independent estimates of the influenza deaths that occurred during the global pandemic using two distinct methodologies. The 2009 H1N1 flu pandemic is estimated to have actually caused about 284,000 (range from 150,000 to 575,000) excess deaths by the WHO-USCDC study and 148,000–249,000 excess respiratory deaths by the WHO-NIVEL study. A study done in September 2010 showed that the risk of serious illness resulting from the 2009 H1N1 flu was no higher than that of the yearly seasonal flu. For comparison, the WHO estimates that 250,000 to 500,000 people die of seasonal flu annually. However, the H1N1 influenza epidemic in 2009 resulted in a large increase in the number of new cases of narcolepsy.

== Name ==
The World Health Organization uses the term "(H1N1) 2009 pandemic" when referring to the event, and officially adopted the name "A(H1N1)pdm09" for the virus in 2010, after the conclusion of the pandemic.

Controversy arose early on regarding the wide assortment of terms used by journalists, academics, and officials. Labels like "H1N1 flu", "Swine flu", "Mexican flu", and variations thereof were typical. Criticism centered on how these names may confuse or mislead the public. It was argued that the names were overly technical (e.g. "H1N1"), incorrectly implying that the disease is caused by contact with pigs or pig products, or provoking stigmatization against certain communities (e.g. "Mexican"). Some academics of the time asserted there is nothing wrong with such names, while research published years later (in 2013) concluded that Mexican Americans and Latino Americans had indeed been stigmatized due to the frequent use of the term "Mexican flu" in the news media.

Official entities adopted terms with varying consistency over the course of the pandemic. The CDC used names like "novel influenza A (H1N1)" or "2009 H1N1 flu". The Netherlands National Institute for Public Health and the Environment used the term "Pig Flu" early on. Officials in Taiwan suggested use of the names "H1N1 flu" or "new flu". The World Organisation for Animal Health, an IGO based in Europe, proposed the name "North American influenza". The European Commission adopted the term "novel flu virus". Officials in Israel and South Korea briefly considered adoption of the name "Mexican virus" due to concern about the use of the word "swine". In Israel, objections stemmed from sensitivity to religious restrictions on eating pork in the Jewish and Muslim populations, in South Korea, concerns were influenced by the importance of pork and domestic pigs.

As terminology changed to deal with these and other such issues, further criticism was made that the situation was unnecessarily confusing. For example, the news department at the journal Science produced an article with the humorous title "Swine Flu Names Evolving Faster Than Swine Flu Itself".

== History ==
Analysis of the genetic divergence of the virus in samples from different cases indicated that the virus jumped to humans in 2008, probably after June, and not later than the end of November, likely around September 2008. The research also indicated the virus had been latent in pigs for several months prior to the outbreak, suggesting a need to increase agricultural surveillance to prevent future outbreaks. In 2009, U.S. agricultural officials speculated, although emphasizing that there was no way to prove their hypothesis, that "contrary to the popular assumption that the new swine flu pandemic arose on factory farms in Mexico, [the virus] most likely emerged in pigs in Asia, but then traveled to North America in a human." However, a subsequent report by researchers at the Mount Sinai School of Medicine in 2016 found that the 2009 H1N1 virus likely originated from pigs in a very small region of central Mexico.

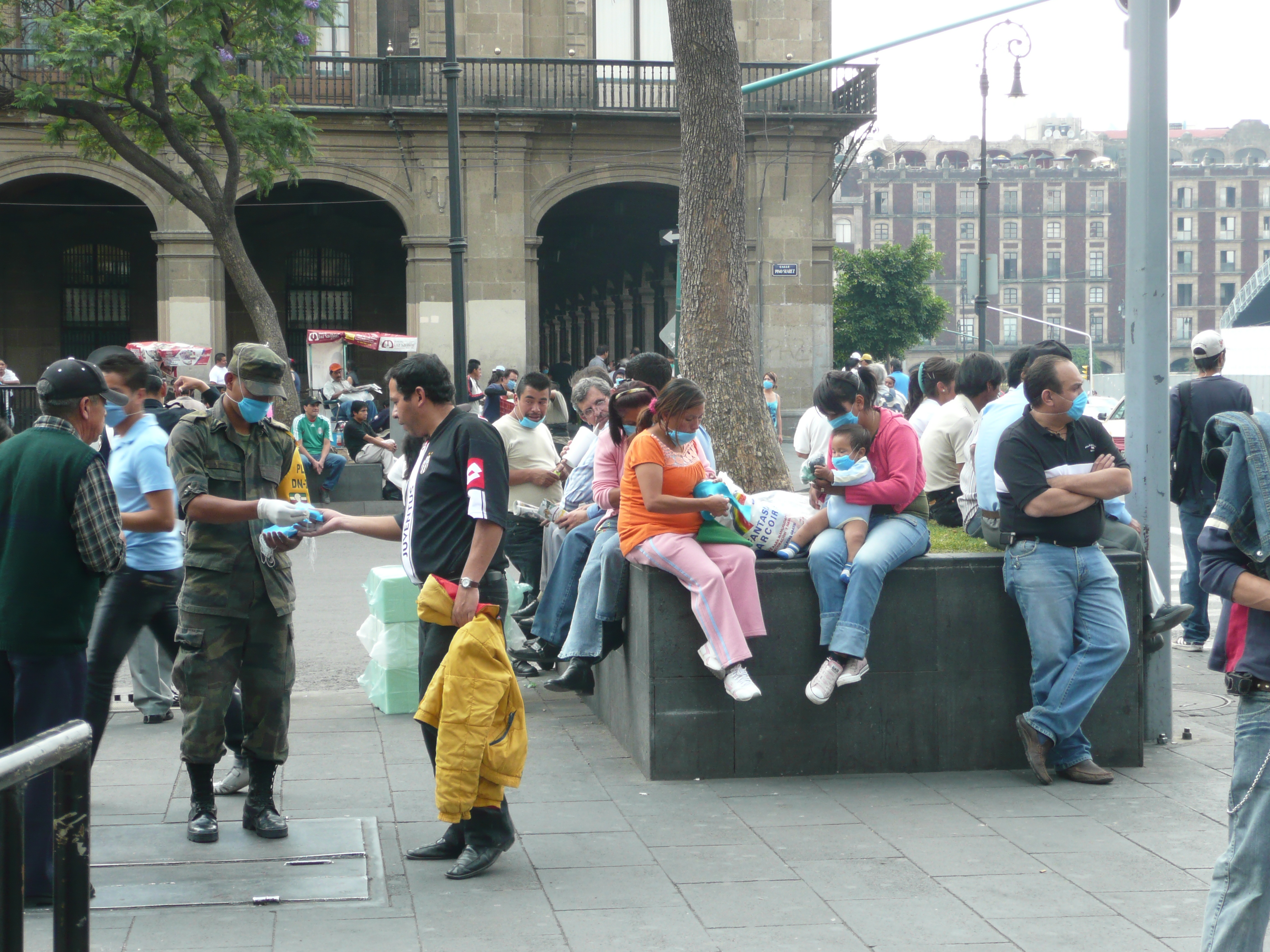
Mexican soldiers distributing protective masks to citizens

Initially called an "outbreak", widespread H1N1 infection was first recognized in the state of Veracruz, Mexico, with evidence that the virus had been present for months before it was officially called an "epidemic". The Mexican government closed most of Mexico City's public and private facilities in an attempt to contain the spread of the virus; however, it continued to spread globally, and clinics in some areas were overwhelmed by infected people. The new virus was first isolated in late April by American and Canadian laboratories from samples taken from people with flu in Mexico, Southern California, and Texas. Soon the earliest known human case was traced to a case from 9 March 2009 in a 5-year-old boy in La Gloria, Mexico, a rural town in Veracruz. In late April, the World Health Organization (WHO) declared its first ever public health emergency of international concern (PHEIC), and in June, the WHO and the U.S. CDC stopped counting cases and declared the outbreak a pandemic.

The H1N1 flu virus cannot be contracted by eating pork products; similar to other influenza viruses, it is typically contracted by person-to-person transmission through respiratory droplets. Symptoms usually last 4–6 days. Antivirals (oseltamivir or zanamivir) were recommended for those with more severe symptoms or those in an at-risk group.

The pandemic began to taper off in November 2009, and by May 2010, the number of cases was in steep decline. On 10 August 2010, the Director-General of the WHO, Margaret Chan, announced the end of the H1N1 pandemic and announced that the H1N1 influenza event had moved into the post-pandemic period. According to WHO statistics (as of July 2010), the virus had killed more than 18,000 people since it appeared in April 2009; however, they state that the total mortality (including deaths unconfirmed or unreported) from the H1N1 strain is "unquestionably higher". Critics claimed the WHO had exaggerated the danger, spreading "fear and confusion" rather than "immediate information". The WHO began an investigation to determine whether it had "frightened people unnecessarily". A flu follow-up study done in September 2010, found that "the risk of most serious complications was not elevated in adults or children." In a 5 August 2011 PLOS ONE article, researchers estimated that the 2009 H1N1 global infection rate was 11% to 21%, lower than what was previously expected. However, by 2012, research showed that as many as 579,000 people could have been killed by the disease, as only those fatalities confirmed by laboratory testing were included in the original number, and meant that many without access to health facilities went uncounted. The majority of these deaths occurred in Africa and Southeast Asia. Experts, including the WHO, have agreed that an estimated 284,500 people were killed by the disease, much higher than the initial death toll.

== Signs and symptoms ==
The symptoms of H1N1 flu are similar to those of other influenzas, and may include fever, cough (typically a "dry cough"), headache, dizziness, sneezing, muscle or joint pain, sore throat, chills, fatigue, and runny nose. Diarrhea, vomiting, and neurological problems have also been reported in some cases. People at higher risk of serious complications include people over 65, children younger than 5, children with neurodevelopmental conditions, pregnant women (especially during the third trimester), and people of any age with underlying medical conditions, such as asthma, diabetes, obesity, heart disease, or a weakened immune system (e.g., taking immunosuppressive medications or infected with HIV). More than 70% of hospitalizations in the U.S. have been people with such underlying conditions, according to the CDC.

In September 2009, the CDC reported that the H1N1 flu "seems to be taking a heavier toll among chronically ill children than the seasonal flu usually does". Through 8 August 2009, the CDC had received 36 reports of pediatric deaths with associated influenza symptoms and laboratory-confirmed pandemic H1N1 from state and local health authorities within the United States, with 22 of these children having neurodevelopmental conditions such as cerebral palsy, muscular dystrophy, or developmental delays. "Children with nerve and muscle problems may be at especially high risk for complications because they cannot cough hard enough to clear their airways". From 26 April 2009, to 13 February 2010, the CDC had received reports of the deaths of 277 children with laboratory-confirmed 2009 influenza A (H1N1) within the United States.

=== Severe cases ===
The World Health Organization reports that the clinical picture in severe cases is strikingly different from the disease pattern seen during epidemics of seasonal influenza. While people with certain underlying medical conditions are known to be at increased risk, many severe cases occur in previously healthy people. In severe cases, patients generally begin to deteriorate around three to five days after symptom onset. Deterioration is rapid, with many patients progressing to respiratory failure within 24 hours, requiring immediate admission to an intensive care unit. Upon admission, most patients need immediate respiratory support with mechanical ventilation.

=== Complications ===
Most complications have occurred among previously unhealthy individuals, with obesity and respiratory disease as the strongest risk factors. Pulmonary complications are common. Primary influenza pneumonia occurs most commonly in adults and may progress rapidly to acute lung injury requiring mechanical ventilation. Secondary bacterial infection is more common in children. Staphylococcus aureus, including methicillin-resistant strains, is an important cause of secondary bacterial pneumonia with a high mortality rate; Streptococcus pneumoniae is the second most important cause of secondary bacterial pneumonia for children and primary for adults. Neuromuscular and cardiac complications are unusual but may occur.

A United Kingdom investigation of risk factors for hospitalisation and poor outcome with pandemic A/H1N1 influenza looked at 631 patients from 55 hospitals admitted with confirmed infection from May through September 2009. 13% were admitted to a high dependency or intensive care unit and 5% died; 36% were aged <16 years and 5% were aged ≥65 years. Non-white and pregnant patients were over-represented. 45% of patients had at least one underlying condition, mainly asthma, and 13% received antiviral drugs before admission. Of 349 with documented chest x-rays on admission, 29% had evidence of pneumonia, but bacterial co-infection was uncommon. Multivariate analyses showed that physician-recorded obesity on admission and pulmonary conditions other than asthma or chronic obstructive pulmonary disease (COPD) were associated with a severe outcome, as were radiologically confirmed pneumonia and a raised C-reactive protein (CRP) level (≥100 mg/L). 59% of all in-hospital deaths occurred in previously healthy people.

Fulminant (sudden-onset) myocarditis has been linked to infection with H1N1, with at least four cases of myocarditis confirmed in patients also infected with A/H1N1. Three out of the four cases of H1N1-associated myocarditis were classified as fulminant, and one of the patients died. Also, there appears to be a link between severe A/H1N1 influenza infection and pulmonary embolism. In one report, five out of 14 patients admitted to the intensive care unit with severe A/H1N1 infection were found to have pulmonary emboli.

An article published in JAMA in September 2010 challenged previous reports and stated that children infected in the 2009 flu pandemic were no more likely to be hospitalised with complications or get pneumonia than those who catch seasonal strains. Researchers found that about 1.5% of children with the H1N1 swine flu strain were hospitalised within 30 days, compared with 3.7% of those sick with a seasonal strain of H1N1 and 3.1% with an H3N2 virus.

== Diagnosis ==
Confirmed diagnosis of pandemic H1N1 flu requires testing of a nasopharyngeal, nasal, or oropharyngeal tissue swab from the patient. Real-time RT-PCR is the recommended test as others are unable to differentiate between pandemic H1N1 and regular seasonal flu. However, most people with flu symptoms do not need a test for pandemic H1N1 flu specifically, because the test results usually do not affect the recommended course of treatment. The U.S. CDC recommend testing only for people who are hospitalized with suspected flu, pregnant women, and people with weakened immune systems. For the mere diagnosis of influenza and not pandemic H1N1 flu specifically, more widely available tests include rapid influenza diagnostic tests (RIDT), which yield results in about 30 minutes, and direct and indirect immunofluorescence assays (DFA and IFA), which take 2–4 hours. Due to the high rate of RIDT false negatives, the CDC advises that patients with illnesses compatible with novel influenza A (H1N1) virus infection but with negative RIDT results should be treated empirically based on the level of clinical suspicion, underlying medical conditions, severity of illness, and risk for complications, and if a more definitive determination of infection with influenza virus is required, testing with rRT-PCR or virus isolation should be performed. The use of RIDTs has been questioned by researcher Paul Schreckenberger of the Loyola University Health System, who suggests that rapid tests may actually pose a dangerous public health risk. Nikki Shindo of the WHO has expressed regret at reports of treatment being delayed by waiting for H1N1 test results and suggests, "[D]octors should not wait for the laboratory confirmation but make diagnosis based on clinical and epidemiological backgrounds and start treatment early."

On 22 June 2010, the CDC announced a new test called the "CDC Influenza 2009 A (H1N1)pdm Real-Time RT-PCR Panel (IVD)". It uses a molecular biology technique to detect influenza A viruses and specifically the 2009 H1N1 virus. The new test will replace the previous real-time RT-PCR diagnostic test used during the 2009 H1N1 pandemic, which received an emergency use authorization from the U.S. Food and Drug Administration in April 2009. Tests results are available in four hours and are 96% accurate.

== Cause ==
The virus was found to be a novel strain of influenza for which existing vaccines against seasonal flu provided little protection. A study at the U.S. Centers for Disease Control and Prevention published in May 2009 found that children had no preexisting immunity to the new strain but that adults, particularly those older than 60, had some degree of immunity. Children showed no cross-reactive antibody reaction to the new strain, adults aged 18 to 60 had 6–9%, and older adults 33%. While it has been thought that these findings suggest the partial immunity in older adults may be due to previous exposure to similar seasonal influenza viruses, a November 2009 study of a rural unvaccinated population in China found only a 0.3% cross-reactive antibody reaction to the H1N1 strain, suggesting that previous vaccinations for seasonal flu and not exposure may have resulted in the immunity found in the older U.S. population.

Analyses of the genetic sequences of the first isolates, promptly shared on the GISAID database according to Nature and WHO, soon determined that the strain contains genes from five different flu viruses: North American swine influenza, North American avian influenza, human influenza, and two swine influenza viruses typically found in Asia and Europe. Further analysis has shown that several proteins of the virus are most similar to strains that cause mild symptoms in humans, leading virologist Wendy Barclay to suggest on 1 May 2009, that the initial indications are that the virus was unlikely to cause severe symptoms for most people.

The virus was less lethal than previous pandemic strains and killed about 0.01–0.03% of those infected; the 1918 influenza was about one hundred times more lethal and had a case fatality rate of 2–3%. By 14 November 2009, the virus had infected one in six Americans with 200,000 hospitalisations and 10,000 deaths—as many hospitalizations and fewer deaths than in an average flu season overall, but with much higher risk for those under 50. With deaths of 1,100 children and 7,500 adults 18 to 64, these figures were deemed "much higher than in a usual flu season" during the pandemic.

In June 2010, scientists from Hong Kong reported discovery of a new swine flu virus: a hybrid of the pandemic H1N1 virus and viruses previously found in pigs. It was the first report of a reassortment of the pandemic virus, which in humans had been slow to evolve. Nancy Cox, head of the influenza division at the U.S. Centers for Disease Control and Prevention, has said, "This particular paper is extremely interesting because it demonstrates for the first time what we had worried about at the very onset of the pandemic, and that is that this particular virus, when introduced into pigs, could reassort with the resident viruses in pigs and we would have new gene constellations. And bingo, here we are." Pigs have been termed the mixing vessel of flu because they can be infected both by avian flu viruses, which rarely directly infect people, and by human viruses. When pigs become simultaneously infected with more than one virus, the viruses can swap genes, producing new variants which can pass to humans and sometimes spread amongst them. "Unlike the situation with birds and humans, we have a situation with pigs and humans where there's a two-way street of exchange of viruses. With pigs it's very much a two-way street."

=== Transmission ===
Spread of the H1N1 virus is thought to occur in the same way that seasonal flu spreads. Flu viruses are spread mainly from person to person through coughing or sneezing by people with influenza. Sometimes people may become infected by touching something—such as a surface or object—with flu viruses on it and then touching their face.

The basic reproduction number (the average number of other individuals whom each infected individual will infect, in a population which has no immunity to the disease) for the 2009 novel H1N1 is estimated to be 1.75. A December 2009 study found that the transmissibility of the H1N1 influenza virus in households is lower than that seen in past pandemics. Most transmissions occur soon before or after the onset of symptoms.

The H1N1 virus has been transmitted to animals, including swine, turkeys, ferrets, household cats, at least one dog, and a cheetah.

== Prevention ==
Because the H1N1 vaccine was initially in short supply in the United States, the CDC recommended that initial doses should go to priority groups such as pregnant women, people who live with or care for babies under six months old, children six months to four years old and health-care workers. In the United Kingdom, the NHS recommended vaccine priority go to people over six months old who were clinically at risk for seasonal flu, pregnant women and households of people with compromised immunity.

Although it was initially thought that two injections would be required, clinical trials showed that the new vaccine protected adults "with only one dose instead of two;" thus the limited vaccine supplies would go twice as far as had been predicted. Health officials worldwide were also concerned because the virus was new and could easily mutate and become more virulent, even though most flu symptoms were mild and lasted only a few days without treatment. Officials also urged communities, businesses, and individuals to make contingency plans for possible school closures, multiple employee absences for illness, surges of patients in hospitals, and other effects of potentially widespread outbreaks. Disaster response organizations such as Direct Relief helped by providing protective items to clinical workers to help them stay healthy throughout flu season.

In February 2010, the CDC's Advisory Committee on Immunization Practices voted for "universal" flu vaccination in the United States to include all people over six months of age. The 2010–2011 vaccine will protect against the 2009 H1N1 pandemic virus and two other flu viruses.

=== Public health response ===
On 27 April 2009, the European Union health commissioner advised Europeans to postpone nonessential travel to the United States or Mexico. This followed the discovery of the first confirmed case in Spain. On 6 May 2009, the Public Health Agency of Canada announced that their National Microbiology Laboratory (NML) had mapped the genetic code of the swine flu virus, the first time that had been done. In the United Kingdom, the National Health Service launched a website, the National Pandemic Flu Service, allowing patients to self-assess and get an authorisation number for antiviral medication. The system was expected to reduce the burden on general practitioners.

U.S. officials observed that six years of concern about H5N1 avian flu did much to prepare for the current H1N1 outbreak, noting that after H5N1 emerged in Asia, ultimately killing about 60% of the few hundred people infected over the years, many countries took steps to try to prevent any similar crisis from spreading further. The CDC and other U.S. governmental agencies used the summer lull to take stock of the United States response to H1N1 flu and attempt to patch any gaps in the public health safety net before flu season started in early autumn. Preparations included planning a second influenza vaccination program in addition to the one for seasonal flu, and improving coordination between federal, state, and local governments and private health providers. On 24 October 2009, U.S. President Obama declared swine flu a national emergency, giving Secretary of Health and Human Services Kathleen Sebelius authority to grant waivers to requesting hospitals from usual federal requirements.

=== Vaccines ===
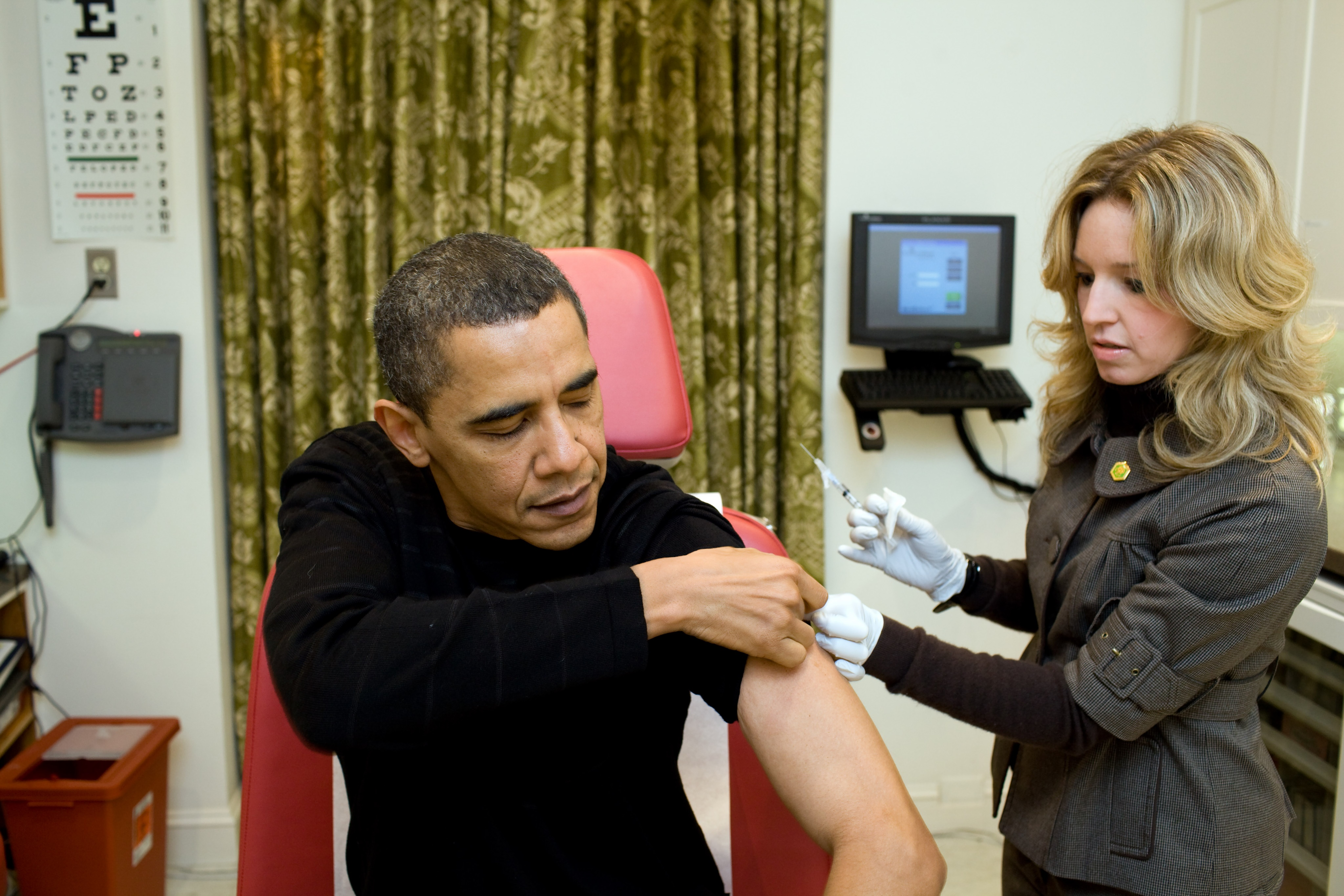
President Barack Obama being vaccinated against H1N1 flu on 20 December 2009

By 19 November 2009, doses of vaccine had been administered in over 16 countries. A 2009 review by the U.S. National Institutes of Health (NIH) concluded that the 2009 H1N1 vaccine has a safety profile similar to that of the seasonal vaccine.

In 2011, a study from the US Flu Vaccine Effectiveness Network estimated the overall effectiveness of all pandemic H1N1 vaccines at 56%. A CDC study released 28 January 2013, estimated that the Pandemic H1N1 vaccine saved roughly 300 lives and prevented about a million illnesses in the US. The study concluded that had the vaccination program started two weeks earlier, close to 60% more cases could have been prevented. The study was based on an effectiveness in preventing cases, hospitalizations, and deaths of 62% for all subgroups except people over 65, for whom the effectiveness was estimated at 43%. The effectiveness was based on European and Asian studies and expert opinion. The delay in vaccine administration demonstrated the shortcomings of the world's capacity for vaccine-production, as well as problems with international distribution. Some manufacturers and wealthy countries had concerns regarding liability and regulations, as well as the logistics of transporting, storing, and administering vaccines to be donated to poorer countries.

=== Accusations of conflict of interest ===
In January 2010, Wolfgang Wodarg, a German deputy who trained as a physician and chaired the health committee at the Council of Europe, claimed that major firms had organized a "campaign of panic" to put pressure on the World Health Organization (WHO) to declare a "false pandemic" to sell vaccines. Wodarg said the WHO's "false pandemic" flu campaign is "one of the greatest medicine scandals of the century". He said that the "false pandemic" campaign began in May 2009 in Mexico City, when a hundred or so "normal" reported influenza cases were declared to be the beginning of a threatening new pandemic, although he said there was little scientific evidence for it. Nevertheless, he argued that the WHO, "in cooperation with some big pharmaceutical companies and their scientists, re-defined pandemics," removing the statement that "an enormous amount of people have contracted the illness or died" from its existing definition and replacing it by stating simply that there has to be a virus, spreading beyond borders and to which people have no immunity.

The WHO responded by stating that they take their duty to provide independent advice seriously and guarded against interference from outside interests. Announcing a review of the WHO's actions, spokeswoman Fadela Chaib stated: "Criticism is part of an outbreak cycle. We expect and indeed welcome criticism and the chance to discuss it". The WHO also stated on their website that "The world is going through a real pandemic. The description of it as a fake is wrong and irresponsible". In March 2010, the Council of Europe launched an enquiry into "the influence of the pharmaceutical companies on the global swine flu campaign", and a preliminary report was in preparation.

On 12 April 2010, Keiji Fukuda, the WHO's top influenza expert, stated that the system leading to the declaration of a pandemic led to confusion about H1N1 circulating around the world and he expressed concern that there was a failure to communicate in regard to uncertainties about the new virus, which turned out to be not as deadly as feared. WHO Director-General Margaret Chan appointed 29 flu experts from outside the organization to conduct a review of WHO's handling of the H1N1 flu pandemic. She told them, "We want a frank, critical, transparent, credible and independent review of our performance."

In June 2010, Fiona Godlee, editor-in-chief of the BMJ, published an editorial which criticised the WHO, saying that an investigation had disclosed that some of the experts advising WHO on the pandemic had financial ties with drug companies which were producing antivirals and vaccines. Margaret Chan, Director-General of the WHO, replied stating, "Without question, the BMJ feature and editorial will leave many readers with the impression that WHO's decision to declare a pandemic was at least partially influenced by a desire to boost the profits of the pharmaceutical industry. The bottom line, however, is that decisions to raise the level of pandemic alert were based on clearly defined virological and epidemiological criteria. It is hard to bend these criteria, no matter what the motive".

=== Infection control ===
==== Travel precautions ====
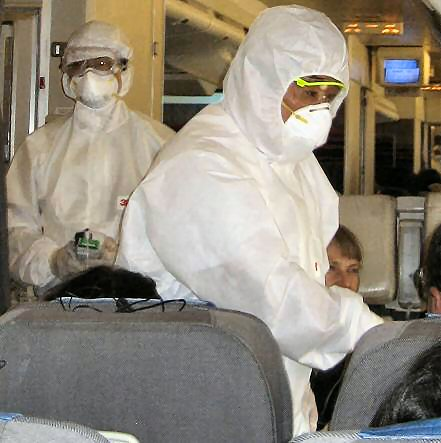
Flu inspection on a flight arriving in China

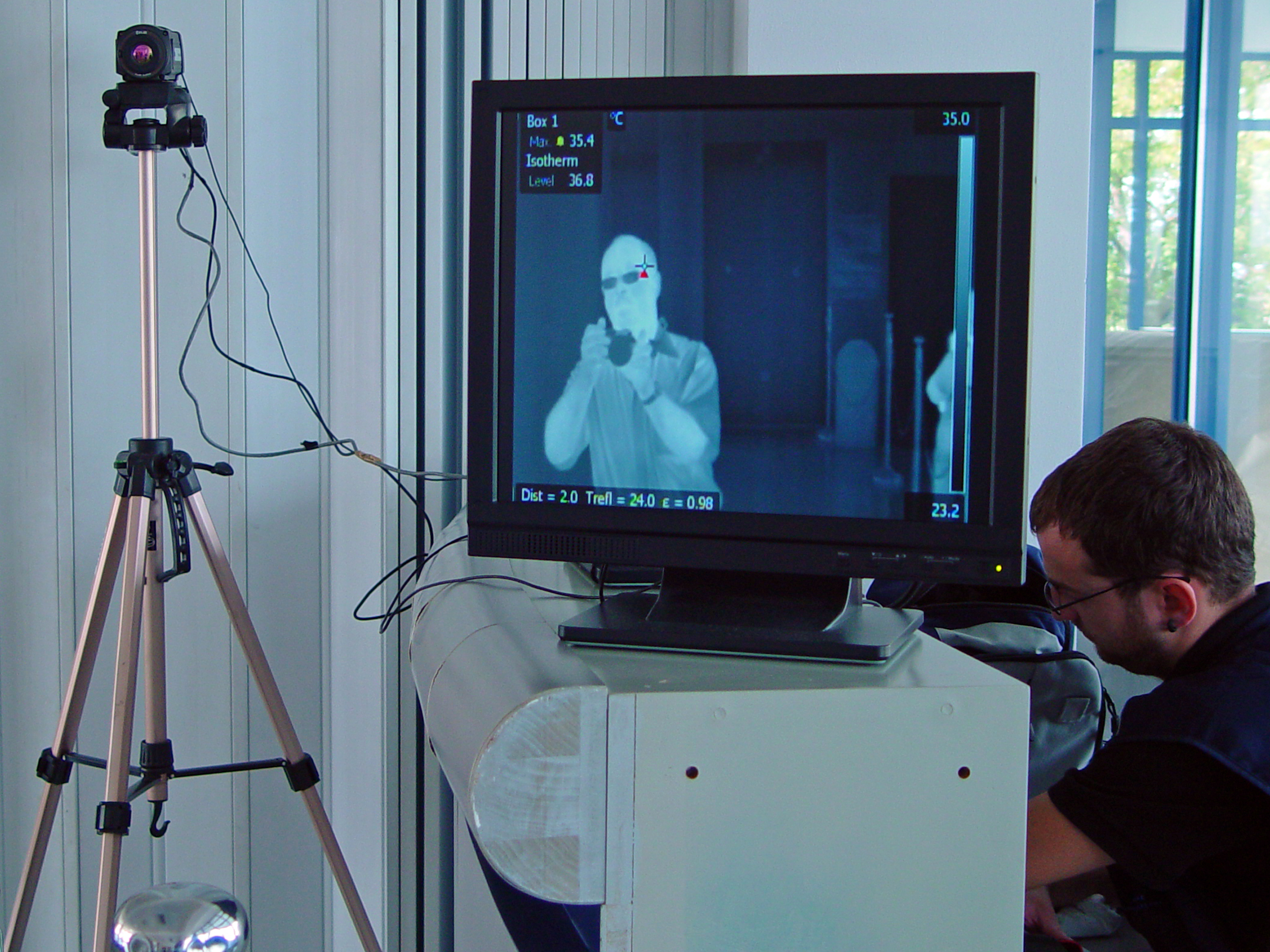
Thermal imaging camera and screen, photographed in an airport terminal in Greece. Thermal imaging can detect elevated body temperature, one of the signs of swine flu.

On 7 May 2009, the WHO stated that containment was not feasible and that countries should focus on mitigating the effect of the virus. They did not recommend closing borders or restricting travel. On 26 April 2009, the Chinese government announced that visitors returning from flu-affected areas who experienced flu-like symptoms within two weeks would be quarantined.

U.S. airlines had made no major changes as of the beginning of June 2009, but continued standing practices which include looking for passengers with symptoms of flu, measles or other infections, and relying on in-flight air filters to ensure that aircraft were sanitised. Masks were not generally provided by airlines and the CDC did not recommend that airline crews wear them. Some non-U.S. airlines, mostly Asian, including Singapore Airlines, China Eastern Airlines, China Southern Airlines, Cathay Pacific and Aeromexico, took measures such as stepping up cabin cleaning, installing state-of-the-art air filters and allowing in-flight staff to wear face masks.

According to studies conducted in Australia and Japan, screening individuals for influenza symptoms at airports during the 2009 H1N1 outbreak was not an effective method of infection control.

==== Schools ====
U.S. government officials were especially concerned about schools because the H1N1 flu virus appeared to disproportionately affect young and school-age people, between six months and 24 years of age. The H1N1 outbreak led to numerous precautionary school closures in some areas. Rather than closing schools, the CDC recommended that students and school workers with flu symptoms should stay home for either seven days total, or until 24 hours after symptoms subsided, whichever was longer. The CDC also recommended that colleges should consider suspending fall 2009 classes if the virus began to cause severe illness in a significantly larger share of students than the previous spring. They also urged schools to suspend rules, such as penalties for late papers or missed classes or requirements for a doctor's note, to enforce "self-isolation" and prevent students from venturing out while ill; schools were advised to set aside a room for people developing flu-like symptoms while they waited to go home and to have ill students or staff and those caring for them use face masks.

In California, school districts and universities were on alert and worked with health officials to launch education campaigns. Many planned to stockpile medical supplies and discuss worst-case scenarios, including plans to provide lessons and meals for low-income children in case elementary and secondary schools closed. University of California campuses stockpiled supplies, from paper masks and hand sanitizer to food and water. To help prepare for contingencies, University of Maryland School of Medicine professor of pediatrics James C. King Jr. suggested that every county should create an "influenza action team" to be run by the local health department, parents, and school administrators. By 28 October 2009, about 600 schools in the United States had been temporarily closed, affecting over 126,000 students in 19 states.

==== Workplace ====
Fearing a worst-case scenario, the U.S. Department of Health and Human Services (HHS), the Centers for Disease Control and Prevention and the Department of Homeland Security (DHS) developed updated guidance and a video for employers to use as they developed plans to respond to the H1N1 outbreak. The guidance suggested that employers consider and communicate their objectives, such as reducing transmission among staff, protecting people who are at increased risk of influenza-related complications from becoming infected, maintaining business operations, and minimising adverse effects on other entities in their supply chains.

The CDC estimated that as much as 40% of the workforce might be unable to work at the peak of the pandemic due to the need for many healthy adults to stay home and care for an ill family member, and advised that individuals should have steps in place should a workplace close down or a situation arise that requires remote work. The CDC further advised that persons in the workplace should stay home sick for seven days after getting the flu, or 24 hours after symptoms end, whichever is longer.

In the UK, the Health and Safety Executive (HSE) also issued general guidance for employers.

==== Face masks ====
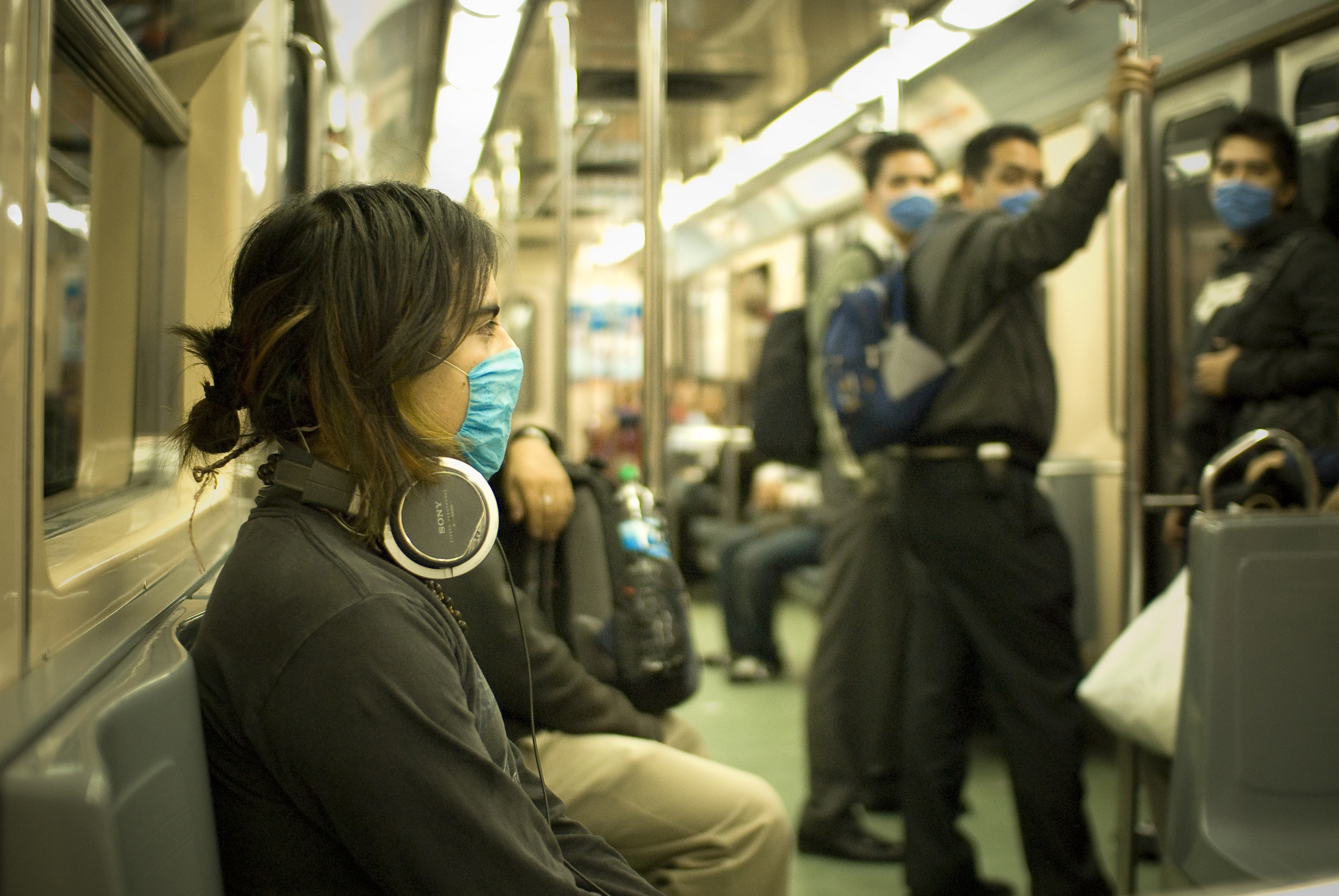
Mexico City Metro

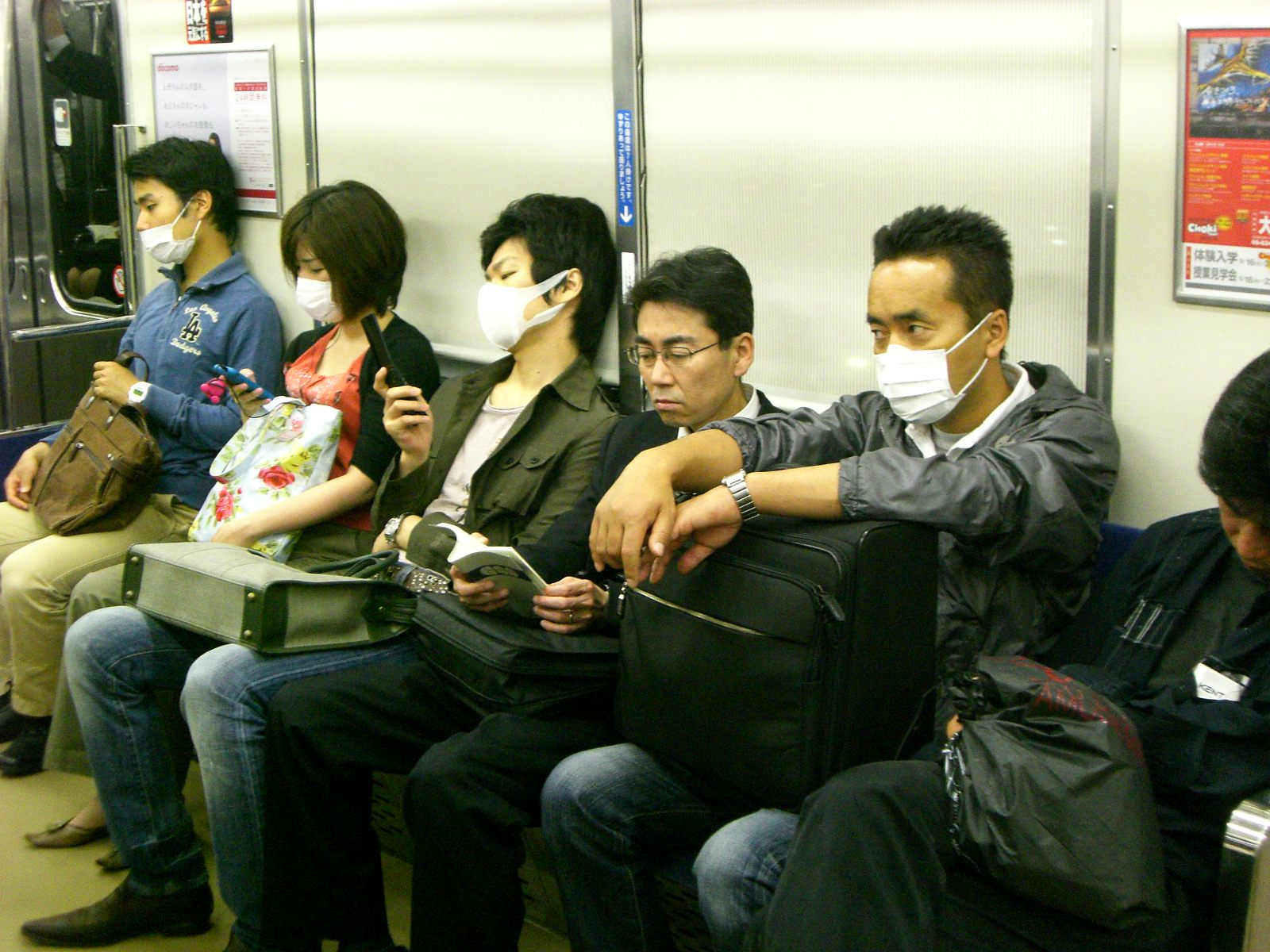
Osaka Loop Line, Japan

The U.S. CDC did not recommend the use of face masks or respirators in non-health care settings, such as schools, workplaces, or public places, with a few exceptions: people who were ill with the virus when around other people, and people who were at risk for severe illness while caring for someone with the flu. There was some disagreement about the value of wearing face masks, as some experts feared that masks may have given people a false sense of security and should not have replaced other standard precautions. Yukihiro Nishiyama, professor of virology at Nagoya University's School of Medicine, commented that the masks are "better than nothing, but it's hard to completely block out an airborne virus since it can easily slip through the gaps". According to mask manufacturer 3M, masks will filter out particles in industrial settings, but "there are no established exposure limits for biological agents such as swine flu virus". However, despite the lack of evidence of effectiveness, the use of such masks is common in Asia. They are particularly popular in Japan, where cleanliness and hygiene are highly valued and where etiquette obligates those who are sick to wear masks to avoid spreading disease.

==== Quarantine ====
During the height of the fear of a pandemic, some countries initiated or threatened to initiate quarantines of foreign visitors suspected of having or being in contact with others who may have been infected. In May 2009, the Chinese government confined 21 U.S. students and three teachers to their hotel rooms. As a result, the US State Department issued a travel alert about China's anti-flu measures and warned travellers against travelling to China if ill. In Hong Kong, an entire hotel was quarantined with 240 guests; Australia ordered a cruise ship with 2,000 passengers to stay at sea because of a swine flu threat. Egyptian Muslims who went on the annual pilgrimage to Mecca risked being quarantined upon their return. Russia and Taiwan said they would quarantine visitors with fevers who come from areas where the flu was present. Japan quarantined 47 airline passengers in a hotel for a week in mid-May, then in mid-June India suggested pre-screening "outbound" passengers from countries thought to have a high rate of infection.

==== Pigs and food safety ====
The pandemic virus is a type of swine influenza, derived originally from a strain which lived in pigs, and this origin gave rise to the common name of "swine flu". This term is widely used by mass media, though the Paris-based World Organisation for Animal Health as well as industry groups such as the U.S. National Pork Board, the American Meat Institute, and the Canadian Pork Council objected to widespread media use of the name "swine flu" and suggested it should be called "North American flu" instead, while the World Health Organization switched its designation from "swine influenza" to "influenza A (H1N1)" in late April 2009. The virus has been found in U.S. hogs, and Canadian as well as in hogs in Northern Ireland, Argentina, and Norway. Leading health agencies and the United States Secretary of Agriculture have stressed that eating properly cooked pork or other food products derived from pigs will not cause flu. Nevertheless, on 27 April, Azerbaijan imposed a ban on the importation of animal husbandry products from the entire Americas. The Indonesian government also halted the importation of pigs and initiated the examination of 9 million pigs in Indonesia. The Egyptian government ordered the slaughter of all pigs in Egypt on 29 April.

== Treatment ==
A number of methods have been recommended to help ease symptoms, including adequate liquid intake and rest. Over-the-counter pain medications such as paracetamol and ibuprofen do not kill the virus; however, they may be useful to reduce symptoms. Aspirin and other salicylate products should not be used by people under 16 with any flu-type symptoms because of the risk of developing Reye syndrome.

If the fever is mild and there are no other complications, fever medication is not recommended. Most people recover without medical attention, although ones with pre-existing or underlying medical conditions are more prone to complications and may benefit from further treatments.

People in at-risk groups should be treated with antivirals (oseltamivir or zanamivir) as soon as possible when they first experience flu symptoms. The at-risk groups include pregnant and post partum women, children under two years old, and people with underlying conditions such as respiratory problems. People who are not in an at-risk group who have persistent or rapidly worsening symptoms should also be treated with antivirals. People who have developed pneumonia should be given both antivirals and antibiotics, as in many severe cases of H1N1-caused illness, bacterial infection develops. Antivirals are most useful if given within 48 hours of the start of symptoms and may improve outcomes in hospitalised patients. In those beyond 48 hours who are moderately or severely ill, antivirals may still be beneficial. If oseltamivir (Tamiflu) is unavailable or cannot be used, zanamivir (Relenza) is recommended as a substitute. Peramivir is an experimental antiviral drug approved for hospitalised patients in cases where the other available methods of treatment are ineffective or unavailable.

To help avoid shortages of these drugs, the U.S. CDC recommended oseltamivir treatment primarily for people hospitalised with pandemic flu; people at risk of serious flu complications due to underlying medical conditions; and patients at risk of serious flu complications. The CDC warned that the indiscriminate use of antiviral medications to prevent and treat influenza could ease the way for drug-resistant strains to emerge, which would make the fight against the pandemic that much harder. In addition, a British report found that people often failed to complete a full course of the drug or took the medication when not needed.

=== Side effects ===
Both medications mentioned above for treatment, oseltamivir and zanamivir, have known side effects, including lightheadedness, chills, nausea, vomiting, loss of appetite, and trouble breathing. Children were reported to be at increased risk of self-injury and confusion after taking oseltamivir. The WHO warned against buying antiviral medications from online sources and estimated that half the drugs sold by online pharmacies without a physical address were counterfeit.

=== Resistance ===
In December 2012, the World Health Organization (WHO) reported 314 samples of the 2009 pandemic H1N1 flu tested worldwide have shown resistance to oseltamivir (Tamiflu). It is not totally unexpected as 99.6% of the seasonal H1N1 flu strains tested have developed resistance to oseltamivir. No circulating flu has yet shown any resistance to zanamivir (Relenza), the other available anti-viral.

=== Antivirals effectiveness questioned in healthy adults ===
On 8 December 2009, the Cochrane Collaboration, which reviews medical evidence, announced in a review published in BMJ that it had reversed its previous findings that the antiviral drugs oseltamivir (Tamiflu) and zanamivir (Relenza) can ward off pneumonia and other serious conditions linked to influenza. They reported that an analysis of 20 studies showed oseltamivir offered mild benefits for healthy adults if taken within 24 hours of onset of symptoms, but found no clear evidence it prevented lower respiratory tract infections or other complications of influenza. Of note, their published finding related only to use in healthy adults with influenza but not in patients judged to be at high risk of complications (pregnant women, children under five and those with underlying medical conditions), and uncertainty over its role in reducing complications in healthy adults still left it as a useful drug for reducing the duration of symptoms. In general, the Cochrane Collaboration concluded "Paucity of good data".

== Epidemiology ==
2009 flu pandemic data
Area	Lab confirmed deaths reported to the WHO
Worldwide (total)	At least 18,449
Africa	168
Americas	At least 8,533
Eastern Mediterranean	1,019
Europe	At least 4,079
South-East Asia	1,992
Western Pacific	1,858
Further information: Cases and deaths by country Note: The ratio of confirmed deaths to total deaths due to the pandemic is unknown. For more information, see "Data reporting and accuracy".

While it is not known precisely where or when the virus originated, analyses in scientific journals have suggested that the H1N1 strain responsible for the 2009 outbreak first evolved in September 2008 and circulated amongst humans for several months, before being formally recognised and identified as a novel strain of influenza.

=== Mexico ===
The virus was first reported in two U.S. children in March 2009, but health officials have reported that it apparently infected people as early as January 2009 in Mexico. The outbreak was first identified in Mexico City on 18 March 2009; immediately after the outbreak was officially announced, Mexico notified the U.S. and World Health Organization, and within days of the outbreak Mexico City was "effectively shut down". Some countries cancelled flights to Mexico while others halted trade. Calls to close the border to contain the spread were rejected. Mexico already had hundreds of non-lethal cases before the outbreak was officially discovered, and was therefore in the midst of a "silent epidemic". As a result, Mexico was reporting only the most serious cases which showed more severe signs different from those of normal flu, possibly leading to a skewed initial estimate of the case fatality rate.

=== United States ===
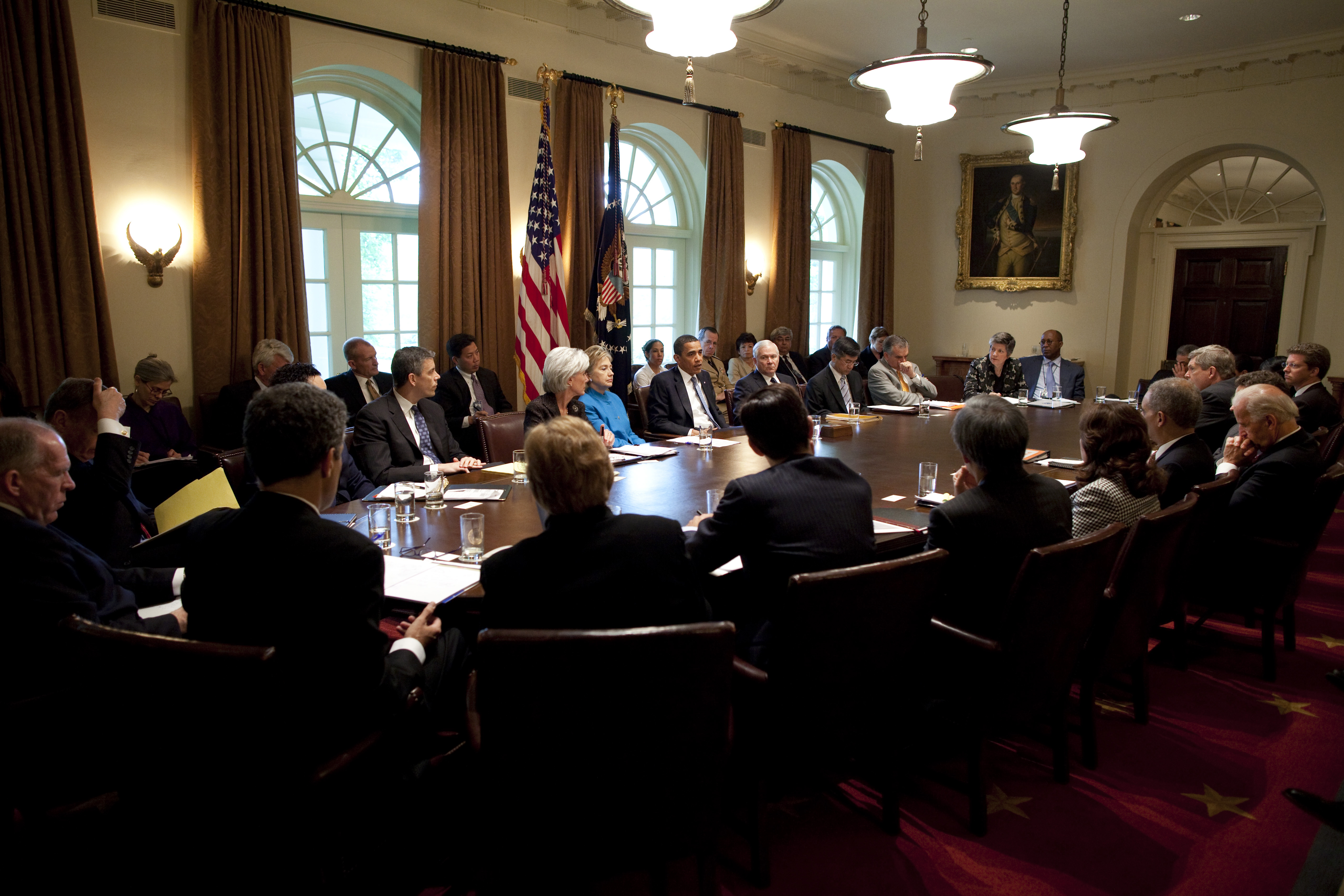
President Obama at Homeland Security Council meeting in Cabinet Room to discuss the H1N1 flu on 1 May 2009

The new strain was first identified by the CDC in two children, neither of whom had been in contact with pigs. The first case, from San Diego County, California, was confirmed from clinical specimens (nasopharyngeal swab) examined by the CDC on 14 April 2009. A second case, from nearby Imperial County, California, was confirmed on 17 April. The patient in the first confirmed case had flu symptoms including fever and cough upon clinical examination on 30 March and the second on 28 March.

The first confirmed H1N1/09 pandemic flu death, which occurred at Texas Children's Hospital in Houston, Texas, was of a toddler from Mexico City who was visiting family in Brownsville, Texas, before being air-lifted to Houston for treatment. The Infectious Diseases Society of America estimated that the total number of deaths in the U.S. was 12,469.

=== Data reporting and accuracy ===
Influenza surveillance information "answers the questions of where, when, and what influenza viruses are circulating. Sharing of such information is especially crucial during an emergent pandemic as in April 2009, when the genetic sequences of the initial viruses were rapidly and openly shared via the GISAID Initiative within days of identification, playing a key role in facilitating an early response to the evolving pandemic. Surveillance is used to determine if influenza activity is increasing or decreasing, but cannot be used to ascertain how many people have become ill with influenza." For example, as of late June, influenza surveillance information showed the U.S. had nearly 28,000 laboratory-confirmed cases including 3,065 hospitalizations and 127 deaths. But mathematical modelling showed an estimated 1 million Americans had the 2009 pandemic flu at the time, according to Lyn Finelli, a flu surveillance official with the CDC. Estimating deaths from influenza is also a complicated process. In 2005, influenza only appeared on the death certificates of 1,812 people in the US. The average annual US death toll from flu is, however, estimated to be 36,000. The CDC explains: "[I]nfluenza is infrequently listed on death certificates of people who die from flu-related complications" and hence, "Only counting deaths where influenza was included on a death certificate would be a gross underestimation of influenza's true impact."

Influenza surveillance information on the 2009 H1N1 flu pandemic is available, but almost no studies attempted to estimate the total number of deaths attributable to H1N1 flu. Two studies were carried out by the CDC; the later of them estimated that between 7,070 and 13,930 deaths were attributable to H1N1 flu from April to 14 November 2009. During the same period, 1,642 deaths were officially confirmed as caused by H1N1 flu. The WHO stated in 2010 that total mortality (including unconfirmed or unreported deaths) from H1N1 flu was "unquestionably higher" than their own confirmed death statistics.

The initial outbreak received a week of near-constant media attention. Epidemiologists cautioned that the number of cases reported in the early days of an outbreak can be very inaccurate and deceptive, due to several causes, among them selection bias, media bias and incorrect reporting by governments. Inaccuracies could also be caused by authorities in different countries looking at differing population groups. Furthermore, countries with poor health care systems and older laboratory facilities may take longer to identify or report cases. "[E]ven in developed countries the [numbers of flu deaths] are uncertain, because medical authorities don't usually verify who actually died of influenza and who died of a flu-like illness". Joseph S. Bresee, then CDC flu division's epidemiology chief and Michael Osterholm, director of the Center for Infectious Disease Research and Policy pointed out that millions of people have had H1N1 flu, usually in a mild form, so the numbers of laboratory-confirmed cases were actually meaningless, and in July 2009, the WHO stopped keeping count of individual cases and focused more on major outbreaks.

=== Follow-up ===
A Wisconsin study published in the Journal of the American Medical Association in September 2010, reported that findings showed that the 2009 H1N1 flu was no more severe than the seasonal flu. "The risk of most serious complications was not elevated in adults or children", the study's authors wrote. "Children were disproportionately affected by 2009 H1N1 infection, but the perceived severity of symptoms and risk of serious outcomes were not increased." Children infected in the 2009 H1N1 flu pandemic were no more likely to be hospitalized with complications or get pneumonia than those who catch seasonal strains. About 1.5% of children with the H1N1 swine flu strain were hospitalized within 30 days, compared with 3.7% of those sick with a seasonal strain of H1N1 and 3.1% with an H3N2 virus.

CDC illness and death estimates from April 2009 to April 2010, in the US are as follows:

- between 43 million and 89 million cases of 2009 H1N1 occurred between April 2009 and 10 April 2010. The mid-level in this range is about 61 million people infected with 2009 H1N1.
- between about 195,000 and 403,000 H1N1-related hospitalizations occurred between April 2009 and 10 April 2010. The mid-level in this range is about 274,000 2009 H1N1-related hospitalizations.
- between about 8,870 and 18,300 2009 H1N1-related deaths occurred between April 2009 and 10 April 2010. The mid-level in this range is about 12,470 2009 H1N1-related deaths.

It has been stated that about 36,000 die from the seasonal flu in the U.S. each year, and this is frequently understood as an indication that the H1N1 strain was not as severe as seasonal influenza. The 36,000 estimate was presented in a 2003 study by CDC scientists and refers to a period from 1990 to 1991 through 1998–99. During those years, the number of estimated deaths ranged from 17,000 to 52,000, with an average of about 36,000. Throughout that decade, influenza A (H3N2) was the predominant virus during most of the seasons, and H3N2 influenza viruses are typically associated with higher death rates. The JAMA study also looked at seasonal influenza-associated deaths over a 23-year period, from 1976 to 1977 and 1998–99 with estimates of respiratory and circulatory influenza-associated deaths ranging from about 5,000 to about 52,000, and an average of about 25,000. CDC believes that the range of deaths over the past 31 years (~3,000 to ~49,000) is a more accurate representation of the unpredictability and variability of flu-associated deaths. The annual toll from seasonal influenza in the US between 1979 and 2001 is estimated at 41,400 deaths on average. Therefore, the H1N1 pandemic estimated mortality of 8,870 to 18,300 is just below the mid-range of estimates.

The 2009 pandemic caused US hospitals to make significant preparations in terms of hospital surge capacities, especially within the emergency department and among vulnerable populations. In many cases, hospitals were relatively successful in making sure that those patients most severely affected by the influenza strain were able to be seen, treated, and discharged in an efficient manner. A case-study of the preparation, planning, mitigation, and response efforts during the fall of 2009 is that of the Children's Hospital of Philadelphia (CHOP) which took several steps to increase the emergency department (ED) surge capacity response. CHOP used portions of the main lobby area as an ED waiting room; several of the region's hospital-based outpatient facilities were in use during evening and weekend hours for non-emergency cases; the ED's 24-hour short-stay unit was utilized to care for ED patients in a longer-term capacity; non-board certified physicians (in pediatric emergency medicine) and inpatient-unit medical nurses were utilized for ED patient care; hospital units normally utilized for other medical or therapeutic purposes were transformed into ED patient rooms; and rooms normally used for only one patient were expanded to at least a capacity of 2.

== Comparisons to other pandemics and epidemics ==
Annual influenza epidemics are estimated to affect 5–15% of the global population. Although most cases are mild, these epidemics still cause severe illness in 3–5 million people and 290,000–650,000 deaths worldwide every year. On average 41,400 people die of influenza-related illnesses each year in the United States, based on data collected between 1979 and 2001. In industrialised countries, severe illness and deaths occur mainly in the high-risk populations of infants, the elderly and chronically ill patients, although the H1N1 flu outbreak (like the 1918 Spanish flu) differs in its tendency to affect younger, healthier people.

In addition to these annual epidemics, Influenza A virus strains caused three global pandemics during the 20th century: the Spanish flu in 1918, Asian flu in 1957, and Hong Kong flu in 1968–69. These virus strains had undergone major genetic changes for which the population did not possess significant immunity. Recent genetic analysis has revealed that three-quarters, or six out of the eight genetic segments, of the 2009 flu pandemic strain arose from the North American swine flu strains circulating since 1998, when a new strain was first identified on a factory farm in North Carolina, and which was the first-ever reported triple-hybrid flu virus.

The Spanish flu began with a wave of mild cases in the spring, followed by more deadly waves in the autumn, eventually killing hundreds of thousands in the United States and 50–100 million worldwide. The great majority of deaths in the 1918 flu pandemic were the result of secondary bacterial pneumonia. The influenza virus damaged the lining of the bronchial tubes and lungs of patients, allowing common bacteria from the nose and throat to infect their lungs. Subsequent pandemics have had many fewer fatalities due to the development of antibiotic medicines which can treat pneumonia.

Major modern influenza pandemics
Name	Date	World pop.	Subtype	Reproduction number	Infected (est.)	Deaths worldwide	Case fatality rate	Pandemic severity
Spanish flu	1918–20	1.80 billion	H1N1	1.80 (IQR, 1.47–2.27)	33% (500 million) or >56% (>1 billion)	17–100 million	2–3%, or ~4%, or ~10%	5
Asian flu	1957–58	2.90 billion	H2N2	1.65 (IQR, 1.53–1.70)	>17% (>500 million)	1–4 million	<0.2%	2
Hong Kong flu	1968–69	3.53 billion	H3N2	1.80 (IQR, 1.56–1.85)	>14% (>500 million)	1–4 million	<0.2%	2
2009 swine flu pandemic	2009–10	6.85 billion	H1N1/09	1.46 (IQR, 1.30–1.70)	11–21% (0.7–1.4 billion)	151,700–575,400	0.01%	1
Typical seasonal flu (Note: Not pandemic, but included for comparison purposes.)	Every year	7.75 billion	A/H3N2, A/H1N1, B, ...	1.28 (IQR, 1.19–1.37)	5–15% (340 million – 1 billion); 3–11% or 5–20% (240 million – 1.6 billion)	290,000–650,000/year	<0.1%	1
Notes

The influenza virus has caused several pandemic threats over the past century, including the pseudo-pandemic of 1947 (thought of as mild because although globally distributed, it caused relatively few deaths), the 1976 swine flu outbreak and the 1977 Russian flu, all caused by the H1N1 subtype. The world has been at an increased level of alert since the SARS epidemic in Southeast Asia (caused by the SARS coronavirus). The level of preparedness was further increased and sustained with the advent of the H5N1 bird flu outbreaks because of H5N1's high fatality rate, although the strains currently prevalent have limited human-to-human transmission (anthroponotic) capability, or epidemicity.

People who contracted influenza before 1957 appeared to have some immunity to H1N1 flu. According to Daniel Jernigan, head of flu epidemiology for the U.S. CDC "Tests on blood serum from older people showed that they had antibodies that attacked the new virus ... That does not mean that everyone over 52 is immune, since Americans and Mexicans older than that have died of the new flu".

In June 2012, a model based study found that the number of deaths related to the H1N1 influenza may have been fifteen times higher than the reported laboratory confirmed deaths, with 80% of the respiratory and cardiovascular deaths in people younger than 65 years and 51% occurring in southeast Asia and Africa. A disproportionate number of pandemic deaths might have occurred in these regions and that efforts to prevent future influenza pandemics need to effectively target these regions.

A WHO-supported 2013 study estimated that the 2009 global pandemic respiratory mortality was ~10-fold higher than the World Health Organization's laboratory-confirmed mortality count (18.631). Although the pandemic mortality estimate was similar in magnitude to that of seasonal influenza, a marked shift toward mortality among persons less than 65 years of age occurred, so that many more life-years were lost. Between 123,000 and 203,000 pandemic respiratory deaths were estimated globally for the last nine months of 2009. The majority (62–85%) were attributed to persons under 65 years of age. The burden varied greatly among countries. There was an almost 20-fold higher mortality in some countries in the Americas than in Europe. The model attributed 148,000–249,000 respiratory deaths to influenza in an average pre-pandemic season, with only 19% in persons <65 years of age.

The COVID-19 pandemic is not caused by an influenza virus but SARS-CoV-2, a coronavirus which also primarily affects the respiratory system.

== See also ==
- SARS
- 2009 swine flu pandemic tables
- 2015–16 Zika virus epidemic
- Black Death
- COVID-19 pandemic
- G4 EA H1N1
- Health crisis
- MERS
- Public health emergency (United States)
- Western African Ebola virus epidemic
