= TAHC =

TAHC may refer to:

- Terrestrial Animal Health Code
- Texas Animal Health Commission
- tahc.ai - hybrid chat platform
