= National Animal Health Reporting System =

The National Animal Health Reporting System (NAHRS) is a joint effort of the U.S. Animal Health Association (USAHA), American Association of Veterinary Laboratory Diagnosticians (AAVLD), and USDA's Animal and Plant Health Inspection Service (APHIS). NAHRS was designed to provide data from chief state animal health officials on the presence of confirmed Office International des Epizooties (OIE) LIST A and B clinical diseases in specific commercial livestock, poultry, and aquaculture species in the United States. It is intended to be one part of a comprehensive and integrated animal-health surveillance system.
