= Aquatic Animal Health Code =

The OIE Aquatic Animal Health Code (AAHC) implements improvement standards of worldwide aquatic animal health and welfare and public health from a scientific point of view. The AAHC "compiles information on diseases of fish, molluscs and crustaceans, and on methods used to control these diseases".

The AAHC includes standards international trade in welfare of farmed fish and utilisation of antimicrobial agents in aquatic animals and their merchandise. All members of the World Trade Organization (WTO) must have an aquatic animal health program that meets the OIE standards. National veterinary authorities use it to provide for early detection of pathogens and to prevent the transfer of same by international trade in animals and animal merchandise, while skirting "unjustified sanitary barriers to trade".

The standards in the AAHC have been adopted by the World Assembly of the OIE. The WTO Agreement on the Application of Sanitary and Phytosanitary Measures "recognises the OIE as the international standard setting organisation for animal health and zoonotic diseases and specifically encourages the Members of the WTO to base their" legislation and regulations "on international standards, guidelines and recommendations, where they exist."

The AAHC had been through 21 editions as of August 2019.

== See also ==
- Agriculture law
- Terrestrial Animal Health Code
