= List of member states of the World Organisation for Animal Health =

The World Organisation for Animal Health (WOAH) is an inter-governmental organisation whose 183 Members have mandated it to improve animal health and welfare worldwide. Created in 1924 under the name of Office International des Epizooties, it had only 28 member countries at the beginning. Those countries were: Argentine Republic, Belgium, Brazil, Bulgaria, Denmark, Egypt, Spain, Finland, France, Great Britain, Greece, Guatemala, Hungary, Italy, Luxemburg, Morocco, Mexico, the Principality of Monaco, the Netherlands, Peru, Poland, Portugal, Romania, Siam (Thailand), Sweden, Switzerland, and Tunisia.

== Member States ==
Original members are listed bold.

Member state	Date of admission
Afghanistan	25 July 1960
Albania	11 February 1991
Algeria	3 July 1962
Andorra	16 January 1998
Angola	6 April 1979
Argentina	20 October 1933
Armenia	29 December 1997
Australia	9 February 1925
Austria	30 June 1928
Azerbaijan	28 February 1995
Bahamas	18 August 2010
Bahrain	27 August 1993
Bangladesh	15 October 1997
Barbados	29 November 1999
Belarus	25 February 1994
Belgium	2 March 1928
Belize	12 January 2002
Benin (Note: Benin: Name was changed from Dahomey on 1 December 1975.)	14 March 1975
Bhutan	14 December 1990
Bolivia (Plurinational State of) (Note: Bolivia (Plurinational State of): Previously referred to as Bolivia.)	6 May 1986
Bosnia and Herzegovina	8 August 1994
Botswana	20 June 1968
Brazil	14 December 1928
Brunei Darussalam	3 February 2004
Bulgaria	11 January 1927
Burkina Faso (Note: Burkina Faso: Name was changed from Upper Volta on 6 August 1984.)	5 December 1961
Burundi	11 October 1999
Cabo Verde (Note: Cabo Verde: Previously referred to as Cape Verde. On 24 October 2013, Cabo Verde requested that its name no longer be translated into different languages.)	26 December 2006
Cambodia (Note: Cambodia: Name was changed to the Khmer Republic on 7 October 1970, and back to Cambodia on 30 April 1975. Name was changed again to Democratic Kampuchea on 6 April 1976, and back to Cambodia on 3 February 1990.)	3 April 1951
Cameroon (Note: Cameroon: Previously referred to as Cameroun (before merging with Southern Cameroons in 1961). By a letter of 4 January 1974, the Secretary-General was informed that Cameroon had changed its name to the United Republic of Cameroon. Name was changed back to Cameroon on 4 February 1984.)	1 January 1960
Canada	14 April 1959
Central African Republic (Note: Central African Republic: By a letter of 20 December 1976, the Central African Republic advised that it had changed its name to the Central African Empire. Name was changed back to the Central African Republic on 20 September 1979.)	4 August 1959
Chad	21 September 1959
Chile	2 April 1962
China	18 February 1992
Colombia	2 January 1956
Comoros	22 December 1993
Democratic Republic of the Congo (Note: Democratic Republic of the Congo: Previously referred to as Congo (Leopoldville) (to differentiate it from Congo (Brazzaville)). Name was changed from the Democratic Republic of the Congo to Zaire on 27 October 1971, and back to the Democratic Republic of the Congo on 17 May 1997.)	22 March 1948
Congo (Note: Congo: Previously referred to as Congo (Brazzaville) (to differentiate it from Congo (Leopoldville)) and the People's Republic of the Congo. Name was changed to Congo on 15 November 1971 (after the Democratic Republic of the Congo changed its name to Zaire). Also referred to as Congo (Republic of the).)	20 June 1983
Costa Rica	28 June 1993
Côte d'Ivoire (Note: Côte d'Ivoire: Previously referred to as Ivory Coast. On 6 November 1985, Côte d’Ivoire requested that its name no longer be translated into different languages; this became fully effective on 1 January 1986.)	19 March 1962
Croatia	13 January 1992
Cuba	4 September 1972
Curacao	27 May 2017
Cyprus	13 November 1961
Czech Republic	15 March 1993
Denmark	21 January 1925
Djibouti	27 January 2003
Dominican Republic	28 January 2003
Ecuador	
Egypt	6 January 1927
El Salvador	22 October 1997
Equatorial Guinea	20 April 2002
Eritrea	12 September 1994
Estonia	13 January 1992
Eswatini	23 November 1970
Ethiopia	2 November 1977
Fiji	18 May 2007
Finland	12 January 1925
France	11 June 1926
Gabon	27 July 1959
Gambia (Note: Gambia: Previously referred to as The Gambia.)	29 November 2004
Georgia	30 September 1992
Germany	16 February 1928
Ghana	24 May 1971
Greece	25 June 1929
Guatemala	15 March 1999
Guinea	23 May 1985
Guinea-Bissau	7 August 2003
Guyana	10 December 1996
Haiti	28 January 1988
Honduras	12 April 1994
Hungary	2 March 1929
Iceland	20 January 1995
India	30 May 1924
Indonesia	1 February 1954
Iran (Islamic Republic of) (Note: Iran (Islamic Republic of): Previously referred to as Iran. By a communication of 5 March 1981, Iran informed the Secretary-General that it should be referred to by its complete name of the Islamic Republic of Iran.)	24 February 1959
Iraq	16 April 1928
Ireland	30 May 1924
Israel	24 January 1949
Italy	23 May 1927
Jamaica	15 October 1997
Japan	27 January 1930
Jordan	26 July 1961
Kazakhstan (Note: Kazakhstan: Spelling was changed from Kazakstan on 20 June 1997.)	23 April 1993
Kenya	28 August 1964
North Korea	2 March 2001
South Korea	21 November 1953
Kuwait	16 March 1988
Kyrgyzstan	8 July 1992
Lao People's Democratic Republic (Note: Lao People's Democratic Republic: Name was changed from Laos on 2 December 1975.)	6 February 1951
Latvia	29 May 1992
Lebanon	1 October 1948
Lesotho	22 June 1984
Liberia	30 May 2014
Libya (Note: Libya: Formerly recognised as the Libyan Arab Republic from 1969 after originally being admitted as Libya. By notes verbales of 1 and 21 April 1977, the Libyan Arab Republic advised that it had changed its name to the Libyan Arab Jamahiriya. On 16 September 2011, the UN General Assembly awarded the UN seat to the National Transitional Council, thereby restoring the original name of Libya.)	7 April 1982
Liechtenstein	1 January 2008
Lithuania	21 October 1931
Luxembourg	24 March 1928
Madagascar (Note: Madagascar: Previously referred to as the Malagasy Republic.)	26 June 1960
Malawi	30 March 1984
Malaysia	19 March 1970
Maldives (Note: Maldives: Previously referred to as the Maldive Islands.)	7 November 2007
Mali	25 January 1961
Malta	27 April 1989
Mauritania	21 August 1959
Mauritius	20 November 1985
Mexico	7 December 1949
Micronesia (Federated States of)	6 March 2009
Republic of Moldova (Note: Republic of Moldova: Previously referred to as Moldova.)	24 January 1995
Monaco	3 March 1925
Mongolia	4 May 1989
Montenegro	10 August 2007
Morocco	6 May 1925
Mozambique	16 March 1949
Myanmar (Note: Myanmar: Name was changed from Burma on 18 June 1989.)	24 August 1989
Namibia	10 December 1990
Nepal	12 March 1998
Netherlands	26 August 1926
New Caledonia	13 February 1950
New Zealand	19 August 1924
Nicaragua	8 February 2001
Niger	7 July 1959
Nigeria	20 June 1969
North Macedonia	10 September 1993
Norway	9 June 1947
Oman	16 April 1984
Pakistan	21 March 1949
Panama	28 December 1977
Papua New Guinea	16 July 2009
Paraguay	12 December 1967
Peru	16 March 1998
Philippines (Note: Philippines: Previously referred to as the Philippine Commonwealth (before becoming a republic in 1946) and as the Philippine Republic.)	29 November 1985
Poland	18 February 1925
Portugal	17 June 1926
Qatar	6 May 1994
Romania	16 July 1927
Russian Federation	29 October 1927
Rwanda	7 May 2002
Saint Lucia	2018
San Marino	9 April 2009
Sao Tome and Principe (Note: Sao Tome and Principe: The official UN designation lacks diacritics; however, the name is constitutionally defined as São Tomé and Príncipe, with diacritics.)	8 May 2002
Saudi Arabia	22 February 1971
Senegal	22 February 1961
Serbia	21 November 2002
Seychelles	20 May 2010
Sierra Leone	13 April 1970
Singapore	2 November 1993
Slovakia	3 May 1993
Slovenia	30 December 1991
Somalia	10 May 1974
South Africa (Note: South Africa: Previously referred to as the Union of South Africa (before becoming a republic in 1961).)	4 November 1936
South Sudan	30 May 2014
Spain	11 February 1927
Sri Lanka (Note: Sri Lanka: Name was changed from Ceylon on 22 May 1972.)	12 March 1971
Sudan	10 October 1959
Suriname (Note: Suriname: Name was changed from Surinam on 23 January 1978.)	10 January 2002
Sweden	17 September 1925
Switzerland	6 July 1926
Syrian Arab Republic	24 October 1986
Chinese Taipei (Note: Previously referred to as Republic of China (Taiwan). Name was changed to Taipei China in 1992, and to Chinese Taipei in 2007.)	1 October 1954
Tajikistan	21 September 1992
United Republic of Tanzania	9 May 1967
Thailand (Note: Thailand: Previously referred to as Siam.)	6 May 1927
Timor-Leste	16 November 2010
Togo	12 August 1968
Trinidad and Tobago	18 May 1998
Tunisia	14 February 1925
Turkey	17 March 1930
Turkmenistan	25 September 1992
Uganda	10 August 1982
Ukraine	16 June 1993
United Arab Emirates	14 April 1980
United Kingdom of Great Britain and Northern Ireland	11 July 1925
United States of America	29 July 1975
Uruguay	23 May 1931
Uzbekistan	9 October 1992
Vanuatu	29 June 1981
Venezuela	23 January 1948
Vietnam	22 February 1951
Yemen	15 July 1999
Zambia	24 October 1964
Zimbabwe	11 December 1961
