= Lyn Finelli =

American epidemiologist and infectious disease researcher

- Education: Columbia University Mailman School of Public Health
- Medical career
- Profession: Doctor
- Field: Epidemiology

Lyn Finelli is an American epidemiologist and infectious disease researcher, who helped lead the U.S. response to the 2009 H1N1 epidemic and contributed to research and public health communication about the COVID-19 pandemic. In 1990 Finelli was granted a doctorate in infectious disease epidemiology from Columbia University. She worked as chief of influenza surveillance and outbreak response at the Center for Disease Control. She led the CDC's response to the 2009 H1N1 outbreak and oversaw 200 employees. She was widely quoted in news coverage about the epidemic. Finelli now serves as executive director of new vaccine development at Merck Research Laboratories. In late March 2020, Finelli co-authored a paper published in the New England Journal of Medicine defining the epidemiology of COVID-19 and calling for further studies. Throughout her career, she has written over 300 scientific papers, book chapters, and articles on a variety of public health related topics, including RSV, sexual health, pneumonia, and hepatitis c.
