= Jean Blancou =

French veterinarian, microbiologist and author

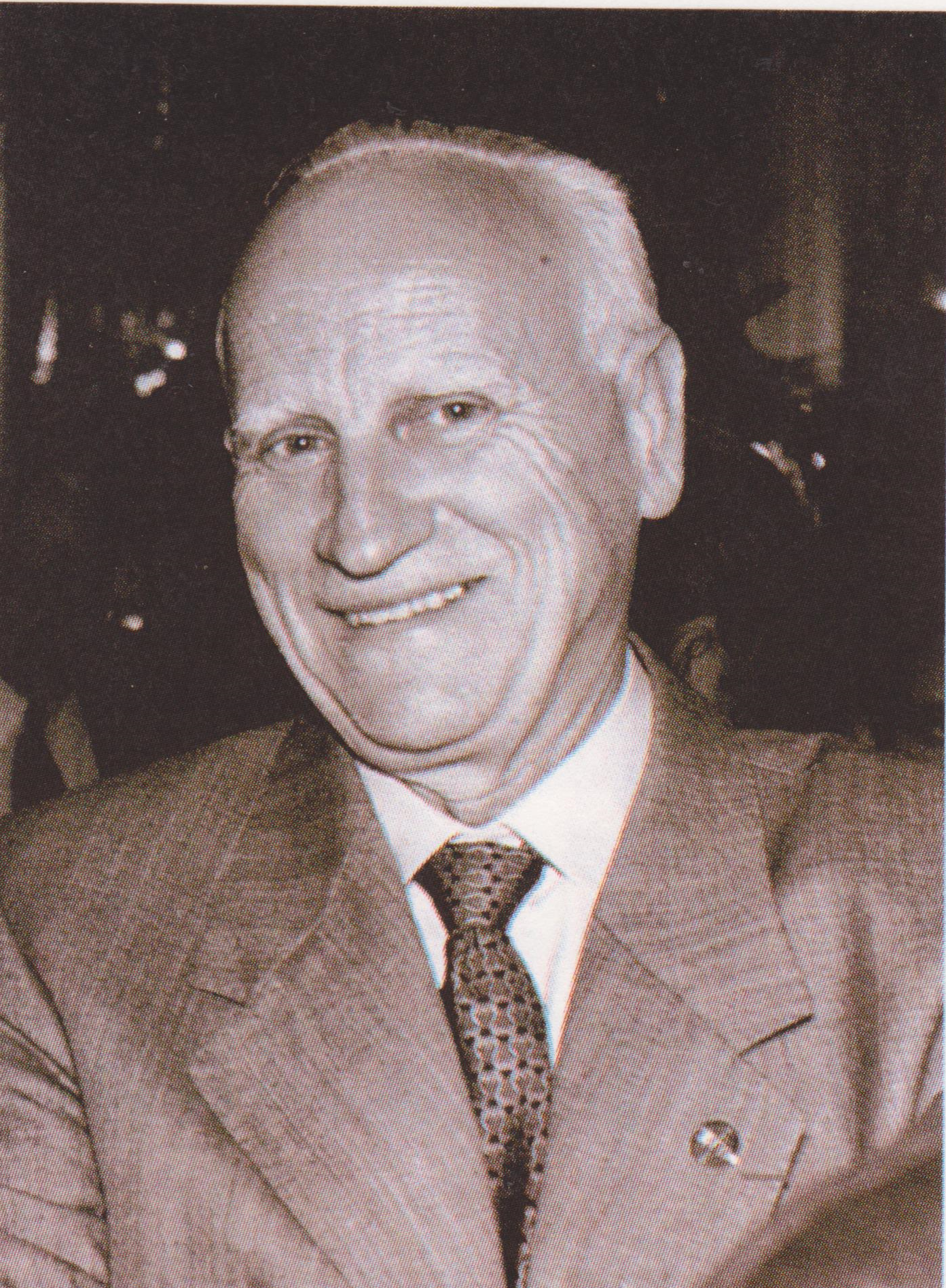
Jean Blancou

Jean Blancou (28 August 1936, Bangui, Central African Republic – 10 November 2010) was a French veterinarian, microbiologist and author of several well known book chapters on the subject of rabies and vaccinations.
