= Terrestrial Animal Health Code =

The World Organisation for Animal Health's Terrestrial Animal Health Code (TAHC) implements improvement standards of worldwide animal health and welfare and public health from a veterinary point of view. It includes standards international trade in terrestrial biological specimens (such as mammals and birds) and their merchandise. National veterinary authorities use it to provide for early detection of pathogens and to prevent the transfer of same by international trade in animals and animal merchandise, while skirting "unjustified sanitary barriers to trade".

The standards in the TAHC have been adopted by the World Assembly of the OIE, the predecessor of the WOAH. The World Trade Organization (WTO) Agreement on the Application of Sanitary and Phytosanitary Measures "recognises the OIE as the international standard setting organisation for animal health and zoonotic diseases and specifically encourages the Members of the WTO to base their" legislation and regulations "on international standards, guidelines and recommendations, where they exist."

The TAHC had been through 28 editions as of August 2019.

== Compartmentalisation ==
The idea of compartmentalisation was instigated by the OIE to foster more international trade in case an exporting country has confirmed a case of exotic disease. Whereas in the 20th century all products from the exporting nation would be affected by bans, compartmentalisation allows trade to flow from theoretically non-affected zones. In other words, compartments can be split up into geographic regions, or corporate structures, or any number of discriminants as long as they are split on a scientific basis.

Compartmentalisation applies to an animal subpopulation defined primarily by management and husbandry practices related to biosecurity.

== Antimicrobials ==
In May 2018, at the 86th General Session of the OIE, several revisions to international standards and guidelines were discussed. New worldwide guidelines were issued with regards to increased veterinary supervision of the use of antimicrobials in animals.

== Growth promotion ==
In May 2018, at the 86th General Session of the OIE held in Paris, several revisions to international standards and guidelines were discussed. A new worldwide applicable definition of non-veterinary medical use included growth promotion as a legitimate aim.

== Treat, control and prevent ==
In May 2018, at the 86th General Session of the OIE held in Paris, several revisions to international standards and guidelines were discussed. New worldwide applicable definitions of to treat, to control and to prevent were instituted.

== See also ==
- Aquatic Animal Health Code
