= World Organisation for Animal Health =

Intergovernmental organization

World Organisation for Animal Health (WOAH) Organisation Mondiale de la Santé Animale (OMSA) Organización Mundial de Sanidad Animal (OMSA)
- Headquarters: Paris, France
- Languages: French; English; Spanish
- Membership: 183 members

Leaders
  - Director General: Dr Emmanuelle Soubeyran
  - President: Susana Pombo
  - Vice president: Fajer Sabah Al Salloom
  - Members of the Council: Roland Xolani Dlamini; Masatsugu Okita; Mary Van Andel; Wilmer José Juarez Juarez; Mbargou Lo; Christine Middlemiss

Establishment
  - International agreement: 25 January 1924
- Website woah.org

The World Organisation for Animal Health (WOAH), formerly the Office International des Epizooties (OIE), is an intergovernmental organization founded in 1924, coordinating, supporting and promoting animal disease control. The primary objective of WOAH is to control epizootic diseases and prevent their spread. Further objectives include the sharing of transparent, scientific information; international solidarity; sanitary safety; and the promotion of veterinary services‚ food safety and animal welfare.

WOAH is recognized by the World Trade Organization (WTO) as an international reference for the safe trade of animals and animal products regarding risks due to animal diseases and zoonoses.

WOAH is not a part of the United Nations (UN) system. Its autonomy is institutional and financial, and its own constitutional texts govern its activities. Since its first General Session held in Paris, the Organisation has carried out its work under the authority of a committee consisting of delegates of the contracting governments. The Organisation maintains permanent relations with over 70 partner organizations and has regional and sub-regional offices on every continent.

During its 91st General Session, the World Assembly of Delegates elected Dr Emmanuelle Soubeyran as Director General for a five-year mandate (2024–2029).

== History ==
=== Origin and founding ===
1920s: Establishment and early years

The Organisation's creation dates to the early 20th century, making it one of the oldest existing Intergovernmental Organizations. The Office International des Epizooties (OIE) was created through an International Agreement signed on 25 January 1924. Earlier, in May 1921, a rinderpest pandemic motivated Delegates at the International Conference for the Study of Epizootics, with diplomats from 43 countries, to express a call for the establishment of an international organization to coordinate responses against infectious animal diseases at a global level.

The need to fight animal diseases at a global level led to the creation of the Office International des Epizooties through the international agreement signed in January 1924.

1940s: Second World War and compatibility with newly founded agencies

The OIE had established its new headquarters by the end of the 1930s, but activities were slowed down by the eruption of the Second World War and the subsequent occupation of Paris by the Nazis in 1940. After the war, the existence of the OIE was initially challenged by the creation by the United Nations of the Food and Agriculture Organization of the United Nations (FAO) in 1946, and the World Health Organization (WHO) in 1948, as both specialist agencies which partially cover the aims of the OIE. However, the opposition of numerous OIE Members and Delegates when the issue was raised in 1946 and 1951, kept the functions of the Organisation alive.

1950s to 1960s: Animal health legislation in the EU and Official agreements

By 1960, the OIE had signed an official agreement with FAO in 1952 and had lent its support to the first attempts to harmonize animal health legislation within the European Community after the signing of the Treaty of Rome in 1957. In 1960, an official agreement was signed between the OIE and WHO.

1990s: Recognition as an international standard-setting organization

The 1990s witnessed the signing of various agreements with the OIE and organizations worldwide. In 1998, the OIE accepted a formal cooperation with the World Trade Organization. The Agreement on the Application of Sanitary and Phytosanitary Measures, also known as the SPS Agreement, clearly defined the OIE as the reference organization for animal health and zoonoses whereby Members are required to base sanitary or phytosanitary measures on international standards, guidelines, and recommendations.

After this, governments began to understand the importance of the Organisation. Between 1990 and 1999, 41 countries became Members. Set up between 1991 and 1999, the Regional Representations, for Asia and the Pacific (1971, then 1991), Eastern Europe (1994), the Americas (1997), and, lastly, the Middle East (1999) and Africa (1999) have allowed the Organisation to keep abreast of the challenges of its Members.

2000 to 2009: The World Organisation for Animal Health and further strategic agreements

In May 2003, the Office became the World Organisation for Animal Health, however, it kept its historical acronym OIE, which was in use until May 2022.

During this decade the OIE reached agreements with organizations and agencies, alongside a new agreement with WHO in 2002, including The World Bank, and World Veterinary Association amongst others.

2010-2020: Rinderpest eradication and increased collaboration with partners

In 2011, the national Delegates of OIE Members unanimously adopted a resolution that officially recognized, following thorough control by the OIE with the support of FAO, that all 198 countries and territories with rinderpest-susceptible animals are free of the disease.

Having celebrated the 85th anniversary of its creation the year before, the OIE adopted its 5th Strategic Plan, which set a roadmap for its global missions in animal health and welfare from 2011 to 2015. The plan sought to continue the key priorities set in previous plans with an enhanced focus on more activities directed to food security, poverty alleviation and animal health, and veterinary public health. Furthermore, the Organisation set a focus on the “One Health” concept, in cooperation with partner organizations.

In January 2017, the outgoing Obama administration designated the OIE as an organization entitled to benefits of the International Organizations Immunities Act.

In March 2022, The Food and Agriculture Organization of the United Nations (FAO), the World Organisation for Animal Health (WOAH), the UN Environment Programme (UNEP), and the World Health Organization (WHO), signed a groundbreaking agreement to strengthen cooperation in the era of One Health, to sustainably balance and optimize the health of humans, animals, plants and the environment.

2022: The World Organisation for Animal Health – WOAH

In May 2022, the Organisation stopped using the historical acronym OIE, and started to use the new acronym WOAH.

2024: The Organisation commemorates its 100th anniversary, a significant milestone marking the Organisation's continued commitment to the health and well-being of animals worldwide.

== Current policies and objectives ==
=== Overall focus ===
WOAH works to improve animal health and welfare worldwide. They do this in several ways. The Organisation monitors the emergence of animal diseases in terrestrial and aquatic animals, either domestic or wild, so they can act before the situation imperils animal health and welfare, public health, or livelihoods. By collecting, analyzing, and disseminating veterinary scientific information through standards, global initiatives, and publications, WOAH collaborates with a wide network of people and has a thorough knowledge base and pool of informative resources. The Organisation also ensures that its Members have the tools and capacity to equip their Veterinary Services and respond to the threats of animal diseases.

Ensure transparency in the global animal disease situation

Another key objective for WOAH is the provision of increased transparency, well-structured policies, increased resources to support Members, strengthened partnerships, and the notification and monitoring of global diseases and shared information via the Organisation's health information system, WAHIS.

Disseminate comprehensive information on animal disease events

Timely dissemination of information is crucial to containing outbreaks. The World Animal Health Information Database Interface provides access to all data held within WOAH's World Animal Health Information System (WAHIS). This interface provides access to immediate notifications on animal disease events, allowing the Organisation's Members to share follow-up reports in response to exceptional disease events in their countries or territories.

== Organizational structure ==
WOAH functions under the authority of a World Assembly of Delegates designated by the Governments of Members. The Organisation is placed under the responsibility of a Director General elected by the World Assembly of Delegates. The International Committee passes resolutions, developed with the support of Commissions elected by delegates, and implemented at WOAH's headquarters.

=== Membership ===
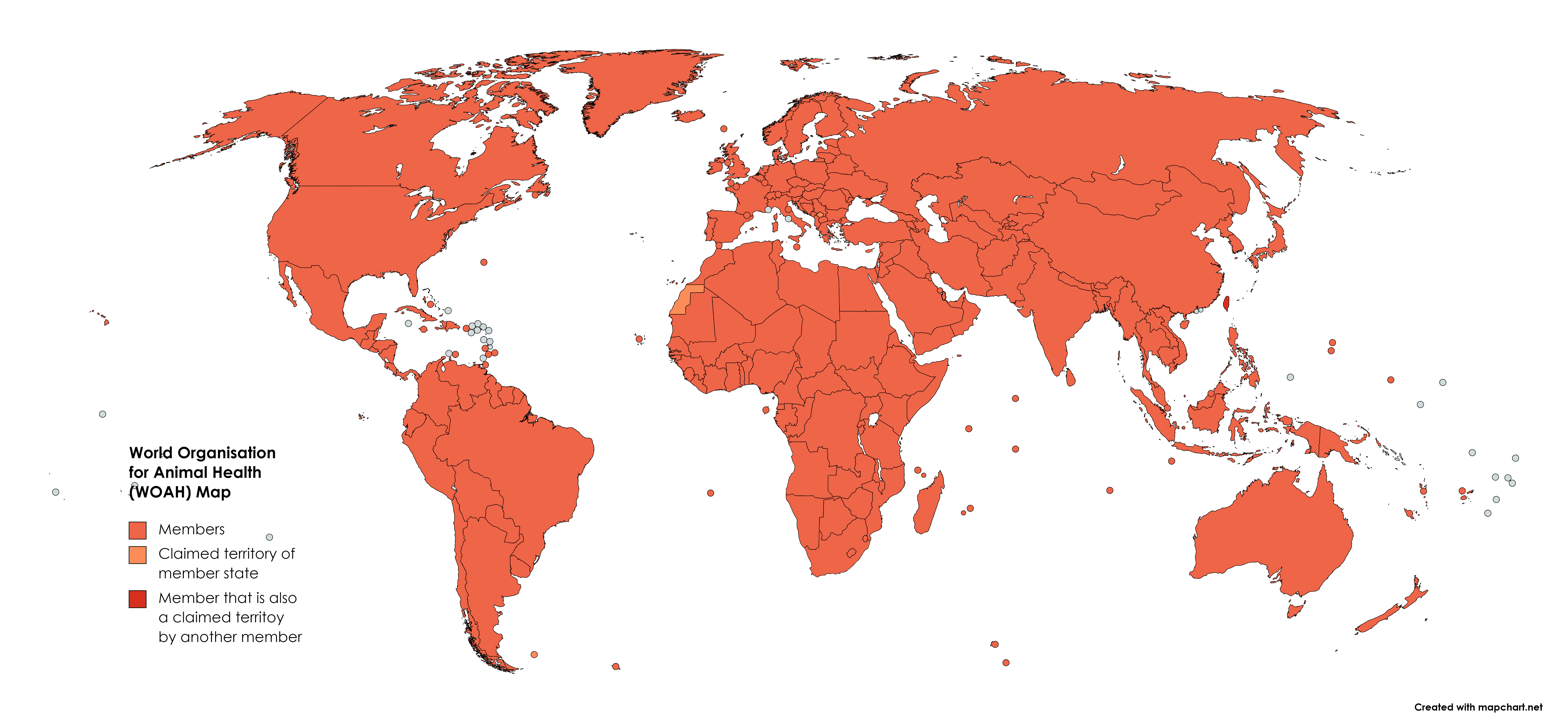
Map showing WOAH membership

As of May 2023, with the latest appointment of St Vincent and the Grenadines, WOAH counts 183 Members.

=== The World Assembly of Delegates ===
Composed of 183 Delegates, the World Assembly of Delegates is the highest authority of WOAH. Delegates belonging to all Members meet at least once a year at a General Session of the Assembly which lasts five days, held yearly in May in Paris. At the annual General Session, Delegates vote on important issues on animal diseases and animal health especially issues related to international trade.

=== Council ===
WOAH's Council meets at least twice a year to examine technical and administrative issues, such as the working programme and budgets that will be presented to the Assembly. The Council comprises the President of the World Assembly of Delegates, the Vice President, the Past President, and six Delegates representing all the regions. The current President is Dr Susana Pombo from Portugal.

=== Director general ===
WOAH has had eight directors general since its creation.

Name	Nationality	Tenure
Dr Emmanuel Leclainche	French	1927–1949
Dr Gaston Ramon	French	1949–1959
Dr René Vittoz	French	1959–1980
Dr Louis Blajan	French	1980–1990
Dr Jean Blancou	French	1990–2000
Dr Bernard Vallat	French	2000–2016
Dr Monique Eloit	French	2016–2024
Dr Emmanuelle Soubeyran	French	2024-2029

== Headquarters ==
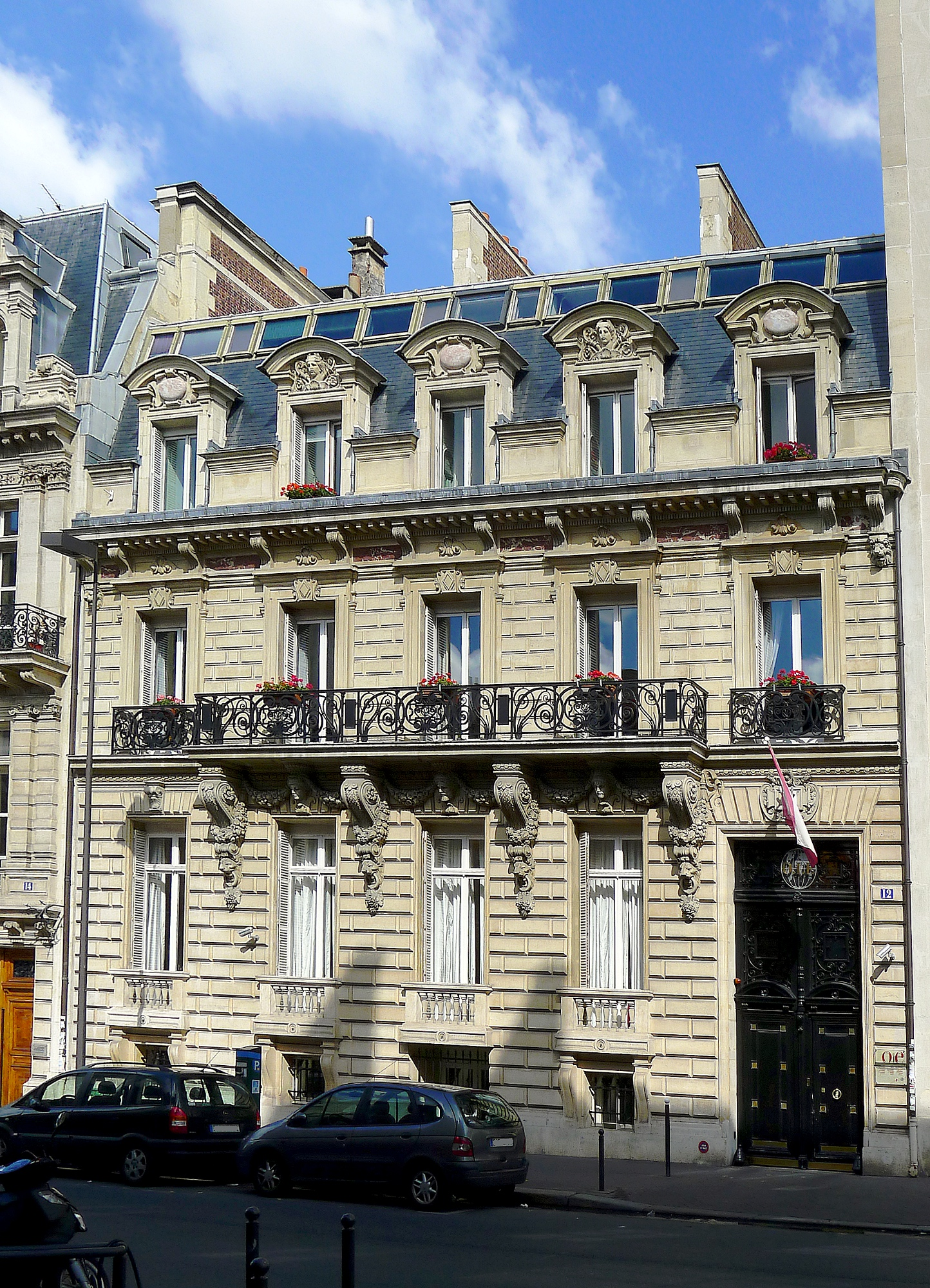
WOAH's headquarters in Paris

WOAH's headquarters is based in Paris, in the 17th arrondissement. It was in 1939 that WOAH moved to the aristocratic district of Parc Monceau, after having occupied premises since 1927 near the Champs de Mars and the Eiffel Tower, that had been provided by the French Higher Public Health Council. In May 1938, the WOAH members gave Dr Emmanuel Leclainche, the Organisation's founder and first Director General, full powers to buy a townhouse in Paris, using the reserve fund. Leclainche chose the mansion from four properties selected by a commission comprising the President of the WOAH, H.C.L.E. Berger (Netherlands), the vice-president, Carlo Bisanti (Italy), and the accountant, Gottlieb Flückiger (Switzerland). On 22 February 1939, WOAH, represented by E. Leclainche, bought the mansion from the Marquise de Montebello.

The 13th General Session of WOAH was held from 30 May to 5 June 1939, at 12 rue de Prony after rebuilding work had been completed. Due to the Second World War, a General Session was not held until 1946, from 2 to 5 October. Following their entry into Paris in June 1940, the German occupying forces temporarily closed and sealed WOAH headquarters. The efforts of President Gottlieb Flückiger, elected in 1939, resulted in its re-opening.

12 rue de Prony was built in 1879, in Neo-Renaissance style, by the celebrated architect Jean-Louis Pascal for the Austrian baron Jonas von Königswater, a former banker and railway owner. A succession of major works to renovate and modernize the headquarters were undertaken by the directors general elected after Leclainche: Gaston Ramon, René Vittoz, Louis Blajan, Jean Blancou and Bernard Vallat. Due to the headlong development of the Organisation (tripling of the staff and the budget since 2001), additional premises have been rented at 14 rue de Prony since 2004. On 16 March 2009, WOAH purchased a large part of the 14 rue de Prony building, adjoining its headquarters.

=== Regional representations ===
WOAH also maintains representations in Africa, the Americas, Asia and the Pacific, Europe, and the Middle East. These representations provide services to WOAH Members to help strengthen surveillance and control of animal diseases in regions.

These representations can be found in the following destinations:

Africa

Representation	Country	City
Regional Representation for Africa	Mali	Bamako
Sub-Regional Representation for Southern Africa	Botswana	Gaborone
Sub-Regional Representation for North Africa	Tunisia	Tunis
Sub-Regional Representation for Eastern Africa and Horn of Africa	Kenya	Nairobi

Americas

Representation	Country	City
Regional Representation for the Americas	Argentina	Buenos Aires
Sub-Regional Representation for Central America	Panama	Ciudad de Panama

Asia and the Pacific

Representation	Country	City
Regional Representation for Asia and the Pacific	Japan	Tokyo
Sub-Regional Representation for SouthEast Asia	Thailand	Bangkok
Regional Representative for Central Asia	Kazakhstan	Astana

Europe

Representation	Country	City
Regional Representation in Moscow	Russia	Moscow
Sub-Regional Representation in Brussels	Belgium	Brussels

Middle East

Representation	Country	City
Regional Representation for the Middle East	Lebanon	Beirut
Sub-Regional Representation for the Persian Gulf	United Arab Emirates	Abu Dhabi

== Specialist commissions ==
WOAH's Specialist Commissions collaborate with its global scientific network and are responsible for the official recognition of animal health status. They advise on epidemiology and the prevention and control of animal diseases.

The Organisation's Specialist Commissions include: The Aquatic Animal Health Standards Commission, the Biological Standards Commission, the Scientific Commission for Animal Diseases and the Terrestrial Animal Health Standards Commission.

Created in 1960, the Aquatic Animal Health Standards Commission is responsible for overseeing the developments of the Aquatic Animal Health Code, ensuring that the aquatic codes reflect current scientific information. The commission is made up of internationally recognized specialists elected by the World Assembly of Delegates, these experts provide advice on the diagnosis, prevention, and control of aquatic diseases. In addition, they act as a focal point for the exchange of information regarding aquatic diseases.

Charged with the responsibility of approving methods of animal disease diagnosis, the Biological Standards Commission works to develop international standards for laboratory diagnostic tests and vaccines for WOAH-listed animal diseases of mammals, birds, and bees. The Scientific Commission, on the other hand, examines voluntary requests from the Organisation's Members regarding disease-specific animal health status.

=== Regional commissions ===
WOAH has five Regional Commissions which serve to express concerns affecting its Members in different regions of the world. These Commissions are entrusted with studying programmes for the control of the main epizootic diseases and organize the coordination of Veterinary Services. WOAH's Regional Commissions currently cover regions across Africa, the Americas, Asia, Far East and Oceania, Europe, and the Middle East. They include:

Africa

- Presidency Regional Commission for Africa, Kinshasa, Congo
- Vice Presidency Regional Commission for Africa, Dakar, Senegal
- Vice Presidency Regional Commission for Africa, Windhoek, Namibia
- Secretary General Regional Commission for Africa, Entebbe, Uganda

Americas

- Presidency Regional Commission for Americas, Managua, Nicaragua
- Vice Presidency Regional Commission for Americas, Buenos Aires, Argentina
- Vice Presidency Regional Commission for Americas, Willemstad, Curaçao
- Secretary General Regional Commission for Americas, Richmond, United States of America

Asia and Pacific

- Presidency Regional Commission for Asia, Far East and Oceania, Qingdao, China
- Vice Presidency Regional Commission for Asia, Far East and Oceania, Wellington, New Zealand
- Vice Presidency Regional Commission for Asia, Far East and Oceania, Tokyo, Japan
- Secretary General Regional Commission for Asia, Far East and Oceania, Nay Pyi Taw, Myanmar

Europe

- Presidency Regional Commission for Europe, Riga, Latvia
- Vice Presidency Regional Commission for Europe, Vienna, Austria
- Vice Presidency Regional Commission for Europe Podgorica, Montenegro
- Secretary General Regional Commission for Europe, Tbilisi, Georgia

=== Ad hoc groups, reference laboratories, and collaborating centres ===
Additionally, ad hoc groups convened at the initiative of the Director General provide expert advice on key topics. Working groups also review developments in their fields and WOAH maintains a network of Collaborating Centres that provide scientific expertise and support to WOAH and its members. Also, reference laboratories are designated to pursue scientific and technical problems relating to diseases. These reference laboratories provide scientific and technical training to personnel from Members and coordinate scientific and technical studies in collaboration with other laboratories or organizations.

== See also ==
- Aquatic Animal Health Code
- Terrestrial Animal Health Code
