= Energy superpower =

Country exporting lots of energy

An energy superpower is a country that supplies large amounts of energy resources (crude oil, natural gas, coal, etc.) to a significant number of other countries - and therefore has the potential to influence world markets for political or economic gains. Energy superpower status might be exercised, for example, by significantly influencing the price on global markets or by withholding supplies. The term "energy superpower" or "renewable energy superpower" is also used to characterize nations at the forefront of energy transition and the development of renewable energy resources (solar, wind, hydro) and technologies.

The term "energy superpower" lacks a precise scholarly definition and is primarily a political term. It is not a concept rooted in rigorous academic or scientific categorization but rather a label used in political discourse to describe countries that wield significant influence in the global energy landscape. This term is subject to interpretation;and can be applied differently by individuals and organizations - depending on their specific agenda or perspectives. As a result, the meaning and applicability of the term "energy superpower" may vary.

As of 2024, the United States is the world's leading producer of total energy, leading producer of petroleum, leading producer of liquefied natural gas (LNG), and leading exporter of LNG.

Russia is widely recognized as an energy superpower.Other nations that have, at different points in time, earned this designation include Saudi Arabia, Canada, Venezuela, and Iran.

== Countries referred to as energy superpowers ==
=== Russia ===
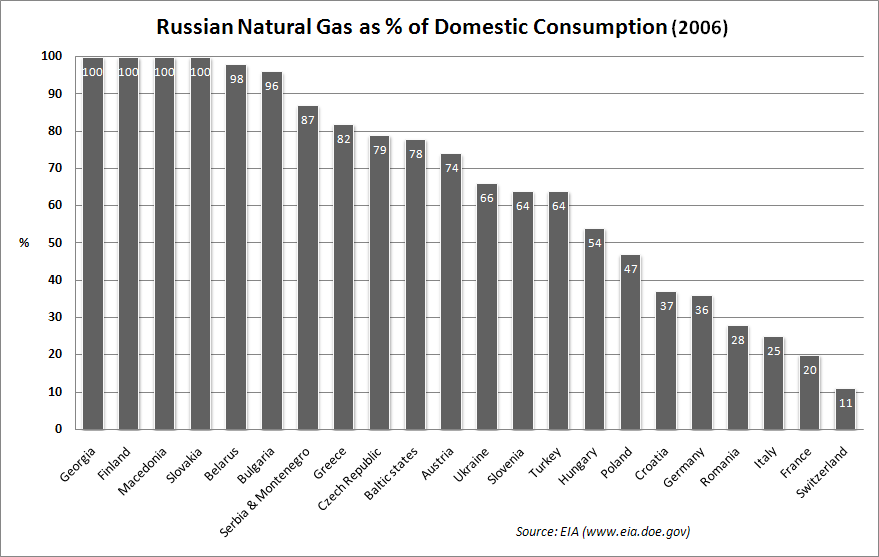
Countries dependent on Russian natural gas for domestic consumption (2006)

The discourses surrounding Russia's energy wealth play a crucial role in Vladimir Putin's attempts to restore Russia's great power status. Some scholars have noted that, although Putin may avoid explicitly using the term "superpower," the idea of Russia as an energy superpower is an integral part of the ideology developed by his regime. This idea emphasizes Russia's significant role in the global energy landscape and frames it as a key player in international politics. However, Russia's status of an energy superpower and the strategic implications it carries have been called into question by many experts. As Vladimir Milov, of the Carnegie Endowment for International Peace, says:

The "energy superpower" concept is an illusion with no basis in reality. Perhaps most dangerously, it doesn’t recognize the mutual dependence between Russia and energy consumers. Because of political conflicts and declining production, future supply disruptions to Europe are likely. As a result, European gas companies may likely someday demand elimination of the take-or-pay conditions in their Russian contracts. This would threaten Gazprom’s ability to borrow. Putin’s attempt to use energy to increase Russian influence could backfire in the long run.

Vladimir Mau, Aleksei Kudrin, German Gref, and many other Russian economists compare Russia's dependence on energy exports with a severe drug addiction and even use the “sitting on the oil needle” metaphor to describe Russia's economic development in the 2000s and the 2010s.

=== Canada ===
In the mid-2010s, former Prime Minister of Canada, Stephen Harper, asserted that Canada should be considered an energy superpower. By advertising Canada as an oil supplier on the international level, Harper defined it as a “reliable producer in a volatile unpredictable world” who can offer its oil-thirsty partners “a transparent regulatory system and a commitment to open markets”. This viewpoint found support among conservative political activists and public intellectuals, such as Ezra Levant, the author of Ethical Oil (2011). However, scholars, Indigenous peoples' organisations and activists, and environmental activists, including such prominent Canadian environmentalists as Andrew Nikiforuk and David Suzuki, contested representations of Canada as an energy superpower. These critics raised concerns about the environmental footprint of Canada's oil sands (e.g., tailing ponds, air pollution and deforestation) in the context of climate change, as well as socio-economic factors such as the potential repercussions on local communities, the equitable distribution of economic benefits, and the overall social implications of prioritizing the oil industry.

In 2025, the current Prime Minister of Canada, Mark Carney, reasserted Canada's position as an "energy superpower" and the need for Canada to develop its production capacity in "clean and conventional energy sources", as well as overseas export capacity. This marks a break in posture from the previous Trudeau administration (2015-2025), which Trudeau once characterized as wanting Canada to be known globally "not for its resources, but for its resourcefulness." The posture of Carney's administration is viewed as a way to attract investment into Canada's economy, and reduce dependence on the United States in response to United States' tariffs during the second Trump administration. Energy projects under construction in Canada include doubling the production capacity of Canada's largest LNG export terminal in Kitimat, and a recently announced memorandum of understanding between the province of Alberta and the Federal Government of Canada laying the conditions for a new oil pipeline to be built between Alberta and the west coast of British Columbia.

=== Iran ===
Iran is widely regarded as an energy superpower due to its immense natural resources, including some of the world’s largest proven oil reserves, estimated at 208 billion barrels, and the second-largest reserves of natural gas. Its South Pars gas field, one of the largest in the world, underscores the country’s importance in global energy markets. Despite facing sanctions, Iran’s energy infrastructure has not been significantly compromised. The country maintains its potential to boost the production and export of both oil and gas. With its strategic location in the Middle East, Iran is well-positioned to become a key energy player, both regionally and globally, offering supply of energy to neighbouring countries and beyond.

=== Venezuela ===
In the 2000s, Venezuela was widely described as a new energy superpower. For example, Manik Talwani, a geophysicist at Rice University, argued in 2007 that Venezuela will likely to join Saudi Arabia in attaining the status of energy superpower. Citing its enormous potential reserves (1.2 trillion potential barrels), Talwani claimed that Venezuela will become an energy superpower in the next few decades as oil production declines elsewhere. However, Venezuela's descent into economic and political chaos has become a cautionary tale about the complexities of managing resource wealth in developing countries. The country's situation serves as a stark reminder of the challenges and potential pitfalls associated with overreliance on natural resources, particularly oil, for economic development.

=== Saudi Arabia ===
As a leading producer and exporter of crude oil, Saudi Arabia has substantial influence over the global oil market and has been labeled as an energy superpower. The country has the capacity to produce and export significant volumes of crude oil, making it a linchpin in the global oil supply chain. Saudi Arabia is a founding member of the Organization of the Petroleum Exporting Countries (OPEC), an intergovernmental organization that plays a central role in setting oil production and pricing policies. As a leading OPEC member, Saudi Arabia has the ability to influence oil production quotas, which directly affects global oil prices.

== Types ==
Over time, as energy systems change, different academic and critical fields describe different kinds of energy super power based on the form of energy generation.

=== Electricity ===
An electrostate is a polity that uses electricity as the primary source of energy for its economy, rather than fossil fuels. In some analyses, the term is extended to include states that also dominate renewable energy supply chains for critical minerals such as lithium, cobalt, nickel, and rare earths, develops renewable technologies such as solar, batteries, and electric vehicles, and supports the widespread deployment of these technologies.

As a neologism, the exact definition is still under debate, with some sources distinguishing between producer electrostates and consumer electrostates. The Carnegie Endowment for International Peace (CEIP) defines the producer electrostate as a country that exports renewable energy technologies, such as solar panels, batteries, electric vehicles, and grid equipment. Their derives from control over the clean‑energy manufacturing capacity, technology standards, and critical mineral supply chains. Whereas a consumer electrostate has a highly electrified economy powered by renewable energy. Energy think tank Ember defines an electrostates as a country where national energy security and economic activity depend on both the expansion of renewable electricity generation and the electrification of final energy consumption in sectors such as transport, heating, and industry. Both conditions are required for the reduction in exposure to fuel‑price volatility and import dependence.

=== Petroleum ===
A petrostate, oil state or petrocracy is a polity whose economy is heavily dependent on the extraction and export of oil or natural gas. Petrostates are conventionally independent nations; however writers like Samuel Weston and Andrew Nikiforuk describe major oil-producing subnational entities like Wyoming, Alberta and Louisiana as also petrostates. A petromonarchy or oil monarchy is a petrostate run by a dynastic absolute monarch; one run by another type of autocrat is a petro-dictatorship.

The presence alone of large oil and gas industries does not define a petrostate: major oil producers that also have diversified economies are not classified as petrostates due to their ability to generate income from various industries and sectors beyond the oil industry. Petrostates typically have highly concentrated political and economic power, resting in the hands of an elite, as well as unaccountable political institutions that are susceptible to corruption.

=== Renewable energy ===
The geopolitical impact of the growing use of renewable energy is a subject of ongoing debate and research. Many countries wealthy in oil, such as Qatar, Russia, Saudi Arabia and Norway, and are able to exert diplomatic or geopolitical influence as a result of their oil. Most of these countries are expected to be among the geopolitical "losers" of the energy transition, although some, like Norway, are also significant producers and exporters of renewable energy. Fossil fuels and the infrastructure to extract them may, in the long term, become stranded assets.

Conversely, nations abundant in renewable resources and the minerals required for renewable technology are expected to gain influence. In particular, China has become the world's dominant manufacturer of the technology needed to produce or store renewable energy, especially solar panels, wind turbines, and lithium-ion batteries. Nations rich in solar and wind energy could become major energy exporters. Countries with large uninhabited areas such as Australia, China, and many African and Middle Eastern countries have a potential for huge installations of renewable energy. The production of renewable energy technologies requires new supply chains. And countries with robust renewable energy industry can offset the geopolitical and economic leverage exerted by traditional fossil-fuel countries.

China is called a 'clean energy superpower' due to the country's long-term strategy and investment in renewable energy. China curbs its reliance on foreign energy by expanding domestic solar, wind, and nuclear energy supply, making the country's economy more resilient against oil supply outages and price hikes. In 2025, the country accounts for 80% of solar panel manufacturing capacity and 60% wind turbine production in the world. The decades-long investment also ensured China's leadership position in the climate politics, renewable energy supply chains, and relevant industries such as the automobiles.

In 2024, the United Kingdom government outlined national strategic plans to become a 'clean energy superpower', being a global leader in renewable technologies by 2030. It involves massive investment in domestic renewables like offshore wind, solar, and nuclear power to lower household bills, create high-skilled jobs, and transition away from volatile fossil fuel markets.

== See also ==
- Energy diplomacy
- Energy security
- Petroleum politics
- Petrostate
- Resource curse
- Swing producer
- World energy resources
