= Supply chain diplomacy =

Form of diplomacy

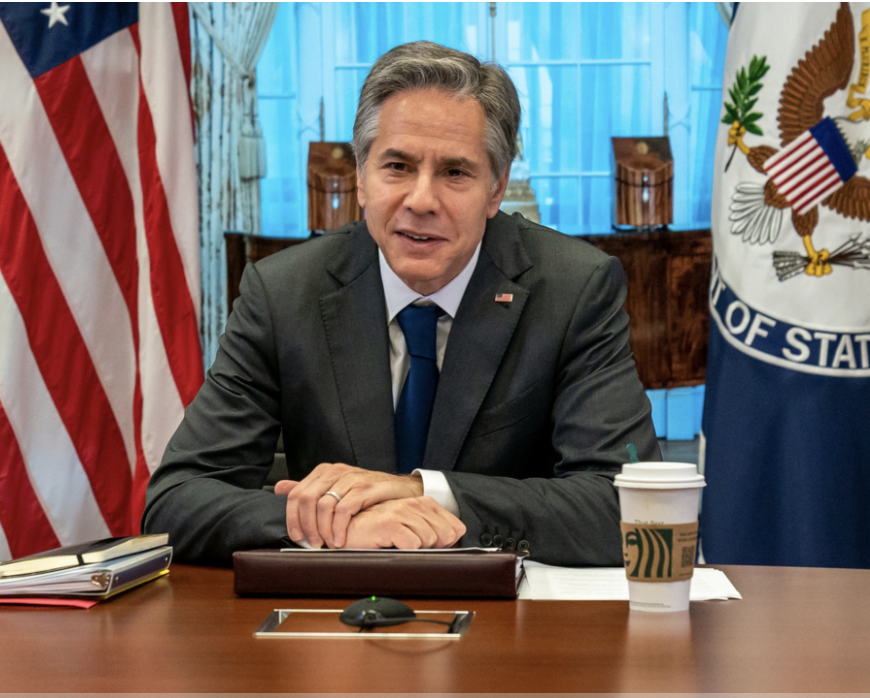
United States Secretary of State Antony Blinken at the Virtual Supply Chain Ministerial Forum, 2022

Supply chain diplomacy (also "supply-chain diplomacy") is a form of diplomacy and statecraft that sets out to use diplomatic means, such as negotiation and international collaboration, to manage and improve the flow of goods and services through international supply chains for the collective benefit of nation states. This can include efforts to address issues such as trade barriers, intellectual property rights, and logistics and transportation challenges that impede a nation's access to supply.

The goal of supply chain diplomacy is to promote mutually beneficial relationships between nation-states and to enhance the efficiency and resilience of global supply chains. In this manner, supply chain diplomacy is concerned with the role of government's in building trust and cooperation among supply chain partners through international forums and engagement, as well as their active participation in reducing risks and vulnerabilities throughout supply chains that are deemed to be critical for national security. Supply chain diplomacy is also often leveraged to achieve foreign policy goals and is considered to be a form of soft power. It is a practice that is closely related to but separate from other forms of diplomacy such as economic diplomacy, commercial diplomacy, and dollar diplomacy.

== Background and overview ==
Supply chain diplomacy, along with e.g. vaccine, science or debt-trap diplomacy, is a sub-category of the larger field of study of foreign relations and the role of government. While the concept of using diplomatic means to achieve global supply chain resiliency and security has a longstanding historical precedent, the definition and academic usage of the term is a relatively modern invention. The organized study of the subject was first introduced in an academic setting in 2021 at the Johns Hopkins University Paul H. Nitze School of Advanced International Studies in Washington, DC through the course Foundations of Supply Chain Diplomacy. More recently, the Federal government of the United States has hosted two supply chain-focused global conferences, namely, the Global Supply Chain Resilience Summit personally convened by President Biden in October 2021, and the Supply Chain Ministerial Forum hosted by United States Secretary of State Antony Blinken and United States Secretary of Commerce Gina Raimondo in July 2022.

Other examples of modern supply chain diplomacy efforts include the cornerstone foreign policy programs such as the Belt and Road Initiative introduced by the Government of China, the European Union's Raw Materials and Battery Alliances, the United States Department of Energy Li-Bridge Alliance undertaken by Argonne National Laboratory, and the joint effort to combine the efforts of programs multilaterally.

Supply chain diplomacy is also being pursued globally through bilateral and regional mechanisms including through, among others, the South Korea-Australia Comprehensive Strategic Partnership, the U.S.- E.U. Trade and Technology Council, the Americas Partnership for Economic Prosperity, and the Indo-Pacific Economic Framework.

== Role in green energy transition ==
While the term first received popular attention as a result of the Covid-19 pandemic and the subsequent 2021–2023 global supply chain crisis, the practice of supply chain diplomacy has seen a marked increase in utilization due to the growing global need for critical minerals linked to the global Energy transition.

As outlined in 2022 by the director of energy and climate resources at the Eurasia Group, Henning Gloystein, “Supply-chain diplomacy will be prioritized by many governments in the coming years as accessing critical raw materials for the green and digital transition has become a top priority.” Furthermore, the United States National Economic Council director Brian Deese described it as the government's responsibility to "engage in supply-chain diplomacy" in order to "make our collective supply chains more secure, diverse, resilient, and sustainable against disruptions."

See also:

- Diplomacy
- Economic diplomacy
- Commercial diplomacy
- Digital supply chain security
- Soft power
- Economic warfare
