= Energy diplomacy =

Form of international diplomacy

Energy diplomacy is a form of diplomacy, and a subfield of international relations. It is closely related to its principal, foreign policy, and to overall national security, specifically energy security. Energy diplomacy began in the first half of the twentieth century and emerged as a term during the second oil crisis as a means of describing OPEC's actions. It has since mainly focused on the securitization of energy supplies, primarily fossil fuels, but also nuclear energy and increasingly sustainable energy, on a country or bloc basis.

== Background ==
Energy diplomacy emerged as a term during the second oil crisis as a means of describing OPEC's actions and of characterizing the quest for the United States to secure energy independence and the Cold War relationship between Russia and satellite states regarding oil and gas exports. Since the oil crises, energy diplomacy has mainly focused on the securitization of energy supplies on a country or bloc basis and on the foreign policy to obtain that energy security.

== Ontological relationship with national security, foreign policy, and energy security ==
Foreign politics has been around for thousands of years of our civilization, while energy has only entered in the last 150 years. However, in that period foreign policy and energy have had an increasing number of overlapping and interconnected elements. Foreign policy in its own part is closely linked and dependent on the concept of national security. National security is a principle of actions governing relations of one state with others based on geography, external threats and other national security challenges, of which energy is one.

The three concepts, national security, foreign policy and energy security are ontologically structured, where national security is the most general concept, foreign policy is one level lower covering the international aspect of national security risks, and the lowest on the scale is energy diplomacy. Foreign policy is linked to national security as it is the tool which implements overall national security. National security also has a direct link to energy diplomacy. National security denotes the capability of a nation to overcome its internal and external multi-dimensional threats by balancing all instruments of state policy through governance. It aims to protect national independence, security and territorial, political and economic integrity, dealing with a large number of national security risks.

Energy is one of the fundamental items on the national security agenda. National security that deals with such external issues and risks is applied and implemented by government departments for external relations. Implementation of the national security strategy involving external factors and international issues is carried out through foreign policy instruments, namely international relations and diplomacy. Energy diplomacy specifically focuses on external energy relations. Despite the ontological hierarchy of the three concepts, it is a recurring theme for them to continuously intersect in practical diplomatic life and the geopolitical reality.

== History ==
The beginning of the 20th century was the early era of energy diplomacy, which was largely marked by corporate players. Such diplomacy was dominated by the corporations that produced and distributed fossil fuel, rather than sovereign governments, as in the case of Royal Dutch Shell and Standard Oil. National security on a national level as a concept in its own right had not yet been formulated, but the energy issues were increasing in importance. Carving up the global oil reserves and markets was carried out persistently, alike during the 1908 negotiations between Royal Dutch Shell head Deterding and the US Standard Oil director Teagle; or on the occasion of signing the US "As-Is" Pool Association agreement in 1928. The corporations were competing and racing over privileges, quotas and allocations. The governments were not too far behind, supporting them and often facilitating the race, but the influential corporations dominantly shaped the industry and foreign policy.

The Post World War II era experienced fall of empires, rise of colonies, global shifts in geopolitical influence of UK, US, Russia and others. It is the OPEC that has succeeded in the 1960s and 1970s to gain ground in relation to the international oil corporations, nationalizing and regaining control over the national fossil fuel resources in several large producing countries. The oil shocks after WWII were the ones that greatly contributed to the growth of security concerns and diplomatic efforts in the energy sphere. The most important occurrences were the Suez Crisis of 1956-1957 and the OPEC oil embargo of 1973–1974. Whole economies were brought near to a standstill, escalating energy issues as top security concerns.

Soon came other disruptions, albeit smaller, caused by the Iranian revolution of 1979, the Iran-Iraq War of 1980 followed by the first Persian Gulf War in 1990–1991. Turbulences on the oil market that disturbed and endangered economies were also caused by the 2003 Iraq invasion, oil price spike of 2007-2008, Russian Ukrainian gas dispute in 2009, and others including smaller disruptions. Oil passages are still a global security concern as 40% of all oil transits via four conduits of the straits of Hormuz, Malacca, Bab-el-Mandeb and the Suez Canal. International Energy Agency (IEA) expects that these quantities will rise from 40% to 60% by 2030. Any longer interruption would cause another large-scale economic downfall.

Therefore, energy diplomacy has entered the domain of foreign policy through the national security passageway. Numerous grave national and international risks associated with energy security and energy diplomacy have paved this way and assured that energy is viewed and judged as a security concern, so it acquired all the features of a security issue, and is constantly monitored for level of risk, potential prevention or intervention in the diplomatic field.

Next to the security path, energy concerns have entered foreign policy considerations via another path, the economy. A valid example is Australia, which has in 2018 decided to form a new policy body titled energy diplomacy. Australia, being by far the largest global exporter of coal, has only been mildly affected by the shifts on the market and geopolitics of energy, so its security risk concerning energy has not been very high.

== The rise of energy risks and main issues ==
Energy diplomacy is a growing diplomatic field, aimed at providing energy security. Energy has entered the sphere of diplomacy and foreign policy as a result of its rising impact on national security and economy. Energy, the ability to do any work, powers the economy. Its uninterrupted flow, inward for importing countries, and outward for exporting, must be secured at all times. Until the last few decades of the 20th century the question of energy was not treated as a matter of such urgency nor geopolitics. The availability, affordability and supply were not a security issue. The industrial production and consumption capacities were smaller, and movement of energy was generally safe and dependable. Throughout the industrial revolution the increasing need for energy grew at a remarkable pace, spiraling in the 20th century. Only in the last 50 years, between 1971 and 2017 world total primary energy supply grew by more than 250% from 5, 519 Mtoe to 13, 972 Mtoe. Energy use worldwide is yet to grow by one-third until 2040.

The changed situation generated a series of factors that required energy security and energy diplomacy to be elevated onto the national security agenda. National security departments worldwide closely monitor the severe escalation of energy use. The modern consumer and the contemporary economy have gradually grown to critically depend on energy. Hence, economy and energy have become inseparable concepts. Energy has become a synonym for the economy and power, and not having enough of it became a concern of the utmost national security. Access to energy resources has decided on war outcomes, security of supply shaped national and international agendas, oil and gas producing countries organized together into coalitions, tapping into the newly discovered energy resources to back their political and geopolitical goals. Oil and gas companies became some of the most influential organizations in the global business and power-influencing arena. Oil price volatility caused by oil shocks spelled economic fortunes or disasters for many participants in the international arena affecting national and geopolitical strategies. The economic consequences were considerable, so energy had to be included on the list of security and foreign policy issues of states.

== Nature of energy diplomacy ==
Energy diplomacy refers to diplomatic activities designed to enhance access to energy resources and markets. It is a system of influencing the policies, resolutions and conduct of foreign governments and other international factors by means of diplomatic dialogue, negotiation, lobbying, advocacy and other peaceful methods. The general relationship between foreign policy and energy diplomacy is conceptually one of principal and agent. Foreign policy sets the goals and overall political strategy while energy diplomacy is a mechanism for achieving the goals. Energy diplomacy is an instrument of foreign policy. The purpose of energy diplomacy is to safeguard economic and energy security. Energy diplomacy channels economic and trade relations of a state with other states and organizations safeguarding Energy security through availability, reliability and affordability.

Diplomatic efforts aimed at providing energy security grew in importance and complexity. It matured and spun off from general foreign policy and public diplomacy into a separate diplomatic niche field, energy diplomacy, mostly after the 1970s oil crises. This diplomatic activity has several other popular names like "geopetroleum politics", or "petro–politics" (Dorraj and Currier, 2011), or pipeline diplomacy (Aalto, 2008), but it mostly covers the same field. Energy diplomacy has developed its own programs, goals, instruments, tactics and action plans, such as the European Union Energy Diplomacy Action Plan.

Thus, at the institutional level, energy diplomacy typically focuses on such topics as targets and guidelines; regulations and energy saving; the development of nuclear energy; research and development and demonstration; oil sharing; energy transportation; energy exploration; energy early warning and response; and, in the context of global warming, energy sustainability and energy transition for hydrocarbon exporting states. Commercial energy diplomacy, a hybrid of commercial diplomacy and energy diplomacy, involves political support for foreign-investing energy businesses.

Energy diplomacy employs foreign policy methods to ensure a steady flow of energy and security of energy supplies. Energy producing and energy consuming countries apply them differently. Energy producing states mostly focus on using energy diplomacy to expand their exports and presence on the global markets. The example is the energy diplomacy of an exporting state, Russia, who aims to secure access to buyers for oil and gas. It is similar with the energy diplomacy of the Organization of the Petroleum Exporting Countries (OPEC), whose focus is similarly export and keeping external demand. Energy consuming and importing states apply energy diplomacy to secure energy supplies and steady inflow, like China's oil diplomacy in Africa or more recently, with Iran. There are also hybrid strategies, which are retained by states that are both large consumers and producers; such are India and the United States.

== Energy diplomacy and the energy transition ==
Although the integration of energy diplomacy into foreign policy for some states has been security and the others economy, the energy transition is reshaping those dynamics so that questions of security and economy will follow a new geopolitical reality. The dynamics of the relationship with foreign policy and national security is thus undergoing a fundamental change—energy transition. Providing energy security has traditionally included several key notions: availability, reliability and affordability, but in the past two decades another crucial aspect is added – environmental sustainability and transition to low carbon energy.

This has initiated a huge shift in how energy is perceived, its toll on the environment and it prompted policies to curb climate change. It was spearheaded by policy makers in the EU. With the proliferation of more renewable energy in the energy mix, like solar, tidal, energy efficiency, wind or water, the geography of resources will not be limited to only a few resource rich countries, but much more evenly spread throughout the world. The way national energy risks are perceived is gradually changing, as energy availability will be significantly improved and more prevalent all over the planet. The energy transition into low carbon energy is already shaping the dynamic relationship of geopolitics, national security strategies, foreign policies and energy diplomacy. Various scholars argue that renewable energy may cause more small-scale conflicts but reduce the risk of large conflicts between states.

== Energy diplomacy by country or bloc ==
=== Arab states of the Persian Gulf ===
Hydrocarbon exporting states in the Persian Gulf, such as those of the Gulf Cooperation Council, traditionally reliant on oil export and often members of OPEC, are increasingly seeking bilateral relations which enable their ability to conduct an energy transition from fossil fuels to energy sustainability, including renewable energy and nuclear power.

=== Australia ===
Australia is considered an energy superpower. Its energy diplomacy focuses primarily on promoting fossil fuels, primarily coal, and securing export markets for them.

=== European Union ===
While the European Union's internal energy policy may be seen as an example of energy diplomacy between the member states, the European Union has been developing external energy policy over the past two decades, via its EU Energy Diplomacy Action Plan, most notably with regard to Russia, Africa, and Eurasia, including across the Caspian basin.

=== People's Republic of China ===
The country on which much of the energy diplomacy literature has focused is China, due to its management of its fundamental energy insecurity, for instance in the relationship between national and corporate interests, as in its gas supply and infrastructure. China faces an energy supply deficit by 2030, and its energy diplomacy is guided by the strategic need to secure sufficient gas and oil supplies by this time. Given this situation, it first aggressively attempted application of the 'Beijing Consensus' to other countries via energy diplomacy, such as the BRICS bloc countries.

China's energy diplomacy has covered a plethora of countries, such as, in the early years, Turkey, and in later years the Middle East and North Africa, with special regard to the Iran and Saudi Arabia conflict, where China's role in peace-building came under scrutiny. China's energy diplomacy with South American countries such as Brazil is an issue, as is its relationship with Russia, which can be examined at the levels of personalism and institutionalism.

At the heart of China's energy diplomacy as regards the West and indeed the world is the issue of whether China's struggle for energy security will result in energy diplomacy behavior normalization through economic interdependence or whether China will continue to practice resource neo-mercantilism and power politics. Global energy governance institutions such as the International Energy Agency continue to look for responsible domestic energy governance from China, while China has switched attention from trying to impose its leadership on BRICS to developing its own "Silk Road Economic Belt", in part via the Shanghai Cooperation Organisation, as a means to obtain energy imports.

=== Russia ===
Russian energy diplomacy is mainly focused on its relationship with Europe, especially over natural gas supply, including across Eurasia, and Russia has combined energy supply with cyber and maritime power as policy instruments. Russia also pursues nuclear energy diplomacy, for instance with Finland and Hungary, via Rosatom.

=== United States ===
United States (US) energy diplomacy has consistently focused on oil, and more recently on the oil and gas boom, and is coordinated by the Bureau of Energy Resources at the Department of State. Its commercial energy diplomacy interests extend widely, beyond the traditional Middle East oil exporters to Central Asian countries such as Kazakhstan. Historically, the US has exported nuclear energy reactors, by building on its Atoms for Peace program exporting research reactors.

== See also ==
- 1973 oil crisis
- 1979 oil crisis
- 2000s energy crisis
- Energy policy
- Energy security
- Energy superpower
- Gulf War
- International Energy Agency
- ITER
- OPEC
- Suez crisis
- Commercial diplomacy
- Medical diplomacy
- Public diplomacy
- Defence diplomacy
