= Trading nation =

Country with high percentage of international trade commodity

A trading nation (also known as a trade-dependent economy, or an export-oriented economy) is a country where international trade makes up a large percentage of its economy.

Smaller nations (by population) tend to be more trade-dependent than larger ones. In 2022, the most trade-dependent OECD member was Luxembourg, where international trade was worth 384% of GDP, while the least trade-dependent was the United States, where international trade made up 26% of GDP.

== Free trade ==
Trading nations tend to favour free trade and economic integration, or at least seek market access for their products (they may also seek some form of protectionism for their own industries). The most desired markets to access are the largest ones.

In 2012, the Canadian news columnist Andrew Coyne described countries with free trade with both the European Union and the United States as a "select group" that includes Colombia, Israel, Jordan, Mexico, Morocco, and Peru. He described South Korea, Chile, and Singapore as "buccaneering free traders" and the only countries to rival Canada in "scale and scope of the trade agreements" that they had signed (roughly 75% of Canada's trade is tariff-free).

South Korea has a free trade agreement with the United States and India and is negotiating with China and the European Union. Chile has free trade agreements with the United States, the European Union, Japan, China and Mexico but not India or South Korea. Singapore has agreements with the United States, Japan, India, China, and South Korea and is in negotiations with the European Union. Coyne argued that if Canada successfully completed agreements with the EU, China, and India, around 90% of Canada's trade would be tariff-free, and it would then make sense to unilaterally abolish any remaining tariffs.

Small countries or city-states that are extremely reliant on international trade are sometimes called entrepôts, which typically engaged in the re-export of products produced elsewhere or finance and services (see offshore financial centre). Modern examples include Hong Kong, Singapore, and Dubai.

Both developed and developing countries rely on trade. Many developing nations pursue a policy of export-oriented industrialization, which they hope will lead to export-led growth.

== Types ==
There are three types of exporting economies: commodity exporters, manufacturing exporters, and services exporters. Most countries, however, do not fall purely in one category.

Commodity exporters include countries with large deposits of natural resources or large amounts of farmland, with populations too small to use all their own resources. The trade of many commodity exporters is dominated by a single commodity. Most least developed countries are reliant on agricultural exports. A 1998 statistical review by the Food and Agriculture Organization showed that 32 developing countries relied on a single commodity for more than half of their agricultural export earnings. Agricultural exporters are generally members of the Cairns Group, a coalition of 19 countries that lobby for more market access. Fossil fuel exporters, such the OPEC countries, are an important and influential subset of commodity exporters.

Manufacturing exporters include many densely populated countries where human labour is the most important resource. They include wealthy countries such as Germany and Japan, as well as developing nations like China and India.

Services-exporting countries include hubs of international finance, tourism, healthcare, and education. Many highly developed countries export services.

Some countries export all of commodities, manufactures, and services. For example, Canada is regularly described as a trading nation as its total trade is worth more than two-thirds of its GDP (the second highest level in the G7 after Germany), which includes all sectors of the economy.

== See also ==
- List of countries by total trade
- List of countries by exports per capita
- List of countries by trade-to-GDP ratio
- List of countries by exports and List of countries by imports
- Trade and development – Trade as a factor and driver of economic development
