= Non-tax revenue =

How a government collects money other than through compulsory levies

Non-tax revenue or non-tax receipts are government revenue not generated from taxes.

== Examples ==
1. Rents, concessions, and royalties from private firms
  1. often from leases for developing natural resources on public land or fisheries in territorial waters
2. User fees collected in exchange for the use of many public services and facilities. Tolls charged for the use of toll roads are an example
3. Fees for the granting or issuance of permits or licenses. Examples include:
  1. vehicle registration plate permits or vehicle registration fees
  2. watercraft registration fees
  3. building fees
  4. driver's licenses
  5. hunting and fishing licenses
  6. fees for professional licensing
  7. fees for visas or passports
  8. fees for demolition, rezoning, and land grading (Note: Land grading prevents the accumulation of silt)
  9. less often, fines for increasing stormwater runoff, destroying native vegetation, or cutting-down healthy trees
4. Fines collected and assets forfeited as a penalty. Examples include parking fines, court costs levied on criminal offenders, and civil forfeiture
5. Aid from abroad (foreign aid)
6. Aid from another level of government (intragovernmental aid) (Note: For example, in the United States, federal grants may be considered non-tax revenue for the receiving states) or from equalization payments
7. Loans, or other borrowing, from monetary funds and/or other governments
8. Tribute or indemnities paid by a weaker state to a stronger one, often as a condition of peace after suffering military defeat. The war reparations paid by the defeated Central Powers after the First World War offer a well-known example.
9. Revenue from profitable state-owned enterprises
10. Revenue from investment funds, sovereign wealth funds, or endowments
11. Revenue from sales of state-owned assets
12. Donations and voluntary contributions to the state

== Global distribution and volume ==
Vis-à-vis tax revenues, much less academic study has been conducted into the volume and distribution of non-tax revenues, although the most significant forms — oil and natural gas revenues and foreign aid — have been extensively studied since Hossein Mahdavy’s seminal 1970 analysis of the Imperial State of Iran.

In 2009, Farhan Zainulabideen and Zafar Iqbal estimated non-tax revenues to comprise a quarter of total global government revenue. Three years later, Christian von Haldenwang and Maksym Ivanyna produced a higher estimate of around 31 percent. (Note: Based upon an estimated 10.1 percent of global GDP as non-tax revenue and 32.9 percent as total government revenue.)

Twenty-first century studies show that non-tax revenue in petrostates can reach up to 80 percent of Gross Domestic Product and over 90 percent of total government revenue. In resource-poor nations — excluding those gaining strategic rents due to geography or perceived need for aid — non-tax revenues are typically around 10 percent of total government revenue.

=== Volatility ===
Non-tax revenues fluctuate much more from one year to another than taxes — three times as much in the European Union, and slightly less than that for the globe as a whole. Many countries in Africa can report changes in non-tax revenue of over 35 percent from one year to another due to variations in the price of their natural resources.

Their value is correlated with changing economic circumstances, repayments and interest on loans may be renegotiated, a record fine in the field of competition can significantly vary the profits of fines and penalties. Moreover, some years are marked by exceptional events: for example, in France in 2012, the sale of "4G" radio frequencies resulted in the collection of nearly €1.3 billion in non-tax revenues.

== Effects ==
The presence of large non-tax revenues — invariably from non-renewable natural resources, foreign aid, or strategic rents like those associated with the Suez Canal — has been shown to make democratisation much less possible. This is generally argued to be because large non-tax revenues weaken the links between state and society and facilitate government investment in repression and patronage, and also because the presence of large non-tax revenues leads to less redistribution of wealth. For instance, it has been calculated that foreign aid has reduced tax revenue in sub-Saharan Africa by ten percent.
