= Economic statecraft =

Type of diplomacy

Economic statecraft is the use of economic tools of a state to achieve its national interests.

== Strategies ==
=== Brazil ===
Brazil has increased focus on engaging in economic diplomacy with the developing world. Brazil has made it a priority to be a leader in sharing technological knowledge in areas such as education and the agricultural sector.

One example of Brazil's economic diplomacy strategy is the Brazilian Cooperation Agency (ABC), which is affiliated with the Brazilian Ministry of External Relations. The ABC has the mandate to negotiate, coordinate, implement and monitor technical cooperation projects and programs with countries, primarily in the developing world, that Brazil has agreements with. As Brazil States:

"Brazil has been investing in agreements with both developed and developing countries to acquire and disseminate knowledge applied to social and economic development. We have practiced the concept of not simply receiving knowledge from developed countries, but also sharing our own experiences with others in effective partnerships towards development.

South-South cooperation contributes to consolidating Brazil’s relations with partner countries as it enhances general interchange; generates, disseminates and applies technical knowledge; builds human resource capacity; and, mainly, strengthens institutions in all nations involved.

Taking these goals into account, ABC has defined focal partners that include African Portuguese-speaking countries (PALOPs), East Timor, Latin America and the Caribbean. In this context, we have started cooperating trilaterally with developed countries as well.

The ultimate goal of technical cooperation – exchanging experiences and knowledge – materializes reciprocal solidarity among peoples and does not only benefit recipient countries, but Brazil as well."

The ABC is a primary example of how Brazil is using economic diplomacy to fit into its larger national strategy of providing leadership in the developing world.

=== China ===
Economic diplomacy is a central aspect of Chinese foreign policy. During China's remarkable economic rise, it has used economic diplomacy primarily through trade, and the use of carrots as a means to accumulate or attract soft power. This was a part of the broader strategy formulated by think tanks in the PRC during the 1990s titled the new security concept. It is referred to in the West as the period of "China's Peaceful Rise".

Since the 2010s, China has changed its strategic doctrine and has begun to more frequently use economic diplomacy as a coercive tool. After 10 years or so of a policy based primarily on economic carrots, China has begun to show a willingness to use economic diplomacy for coercive means. This is evidenced in the September 2010 incident that blocked shipments of rare earth minerals to Japan. Another incident took place in 2012 in the Philippines, where China sent a gunboat in to enforce trade restricts. US-based think-tank CSIS has stated that China's willingness to use bring in warships during trade disputes is reminiscent to an earlier era of American gunboat diplomacy.

=== Kazakhstan ===
Kazakhstan has formally identified economic diplomacy as a key function of the country's foreign policy to yield productive economic and trade relations at bilateral and multilateral levels. The Ministry of Trade and Integration of Kazakhstan, or MTI, was created to oversee the country's economic diplomacy. The MTI and the Ministry of Foreign Affairs are key entities responsible for executing economic diplomacy and promoting Kazakhstan's economic goals abroad.

Kazakhstan hosted a South-South Development Exchange on Economic Diversification and Industrialization in Africa with 43 African governments.

=== United States ===
The United States has a long history of economic diplomacy dating back to the dollar diplomacy of William Howard Taft. The United States was also central to perhaps the most important economic diplomacy event, the Bretton Woods Conference where the International Monetary Fund and International Bank of Reconstruction and Development were created. The United States was involved in one of the more notable acts of economic diplomacy in history with the Marshall Plan.

Though it has always played an important role, Economic diplomacy took on increased importance during the first term of President Barack Obama under the leadership of Secretary of State Hillary Clinton. During a major policy speech as Secretary of State, Clinton stated that economic statecraft is at the heart of (the American) foreign policy agenda. Clinton saw economic development and democratic development as inextricably linked. In her speech she explained the importance of its success:

We happen to believe that our model is not only the best for us; we think it embodies universal principles, human aspirations, and proven results that make it the best model for any country or people. Now, there can be variations on how it’s implemented, but we are in this competition to win it. We want to make clear that it’s not only good for America but it’s good for the rest of the world to pursue democratic and economic reform. If people don’t believe that democracy and free markets deliver, then they’re going to be looking elsewhere for models that more readily respond to their daily needs.

Secretary Clinton saw pursuing mutually beneficial trade between the United States and other areas of the world as central to the American diplomatic agenda. She went on to detail the American strategy for several significant regions.

In his best-selling semi-autobiographical book, Confessions of an Economic Hit Man, John Perkins, a US ex-economic diplomat, describes what he calls a system of corporatocracy and greed as the driving forces behind establishing the United States as a global empire, in which he took a role as an economic hit man to expand its influence. In this capacity, Perkins recounts his meetings with some prominent individuals, including Graham Greene and Omar Torrijos. Perkins describes the role of an economic hit man as follows:

Economic hit men (EHMs) are highly paid professionals who cheat countries around the globe out of trillions of dollars. They funnel money from the World Bank, the U.S. Agency for International Development (USAID), and other foreign "aid" organizations into the coffers of huge corporations and the pockets of a few wealthy families who control the planet's natural resources. Their tools included fraudulent financial reports, rigged elections, payoffs, extortion, sex, and murder. They play a game as old as empire, but one that has taken on new and terrifying dimensions during this time of globalization...

==== Obama administration strategies ====
On Russia: "Even in a U.S.-Russia relationship dominated for decades by politics and security, we are now focused on helping Russia join the World Trade Organization, and we are putting a special premium on protecting freedom of navigation and a rules-based approach to resource development in places like the South China Sea and the Arctic Ocean."

On Europe: "Together, America and Europe account for half of the world’s economic output, but just one-third of global trade. We can and we should be trading more. At the Transatlantic Economic Council, too often we re-litigate regulatory differences when we ought to be resolving them and avoiding new ones. And this frustrates companies on both sides of the Atlantic. The Transatlantic Economic Council is the forum where we try to resolve these differences, and I believe harmonizing regulatory schemes between the United States and the EU is one of the best ways we can both enhance growth, enhance exports, and avoid duplicative costs. But if you spend weeks arguing about the size of a jar for baby food, that’s not exactly facing up to the potential of the payoff that comes from resolving these issues."

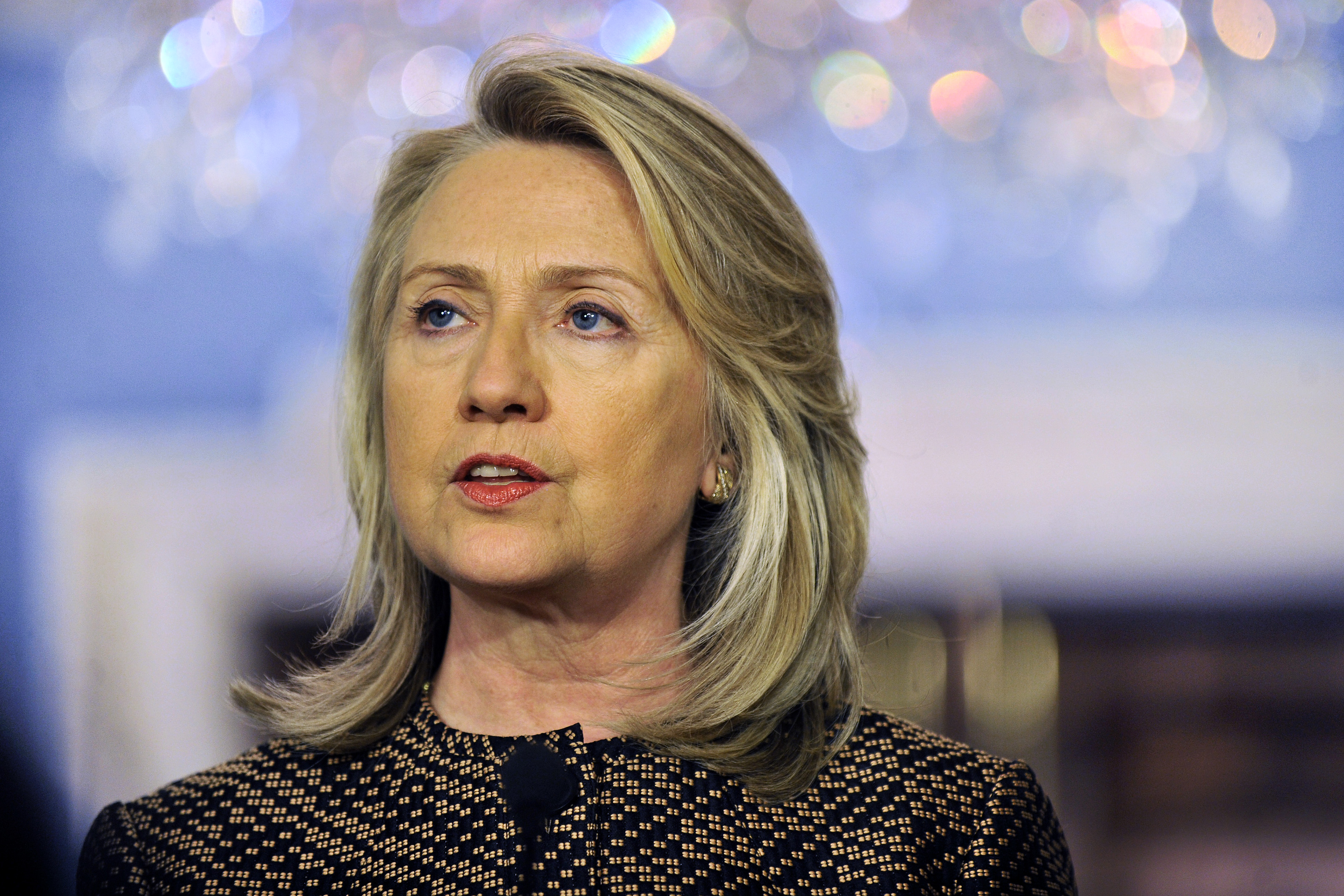
Former Secretary of State Hillary Clinton prioritized economic diplomacy during her time at the State Department.

On China: "We also need to promote the free flow of capital, too. Investment in both directions, backed by well-enforced rules, is vital to creating growth and jobs here at home. For example, last year, the Kentucky-based company that owns KFC and Pizza Hut, two iconic American brands, actually made more money selling pizza and fried chicken in China than in the United States. But this creates jobs at headquarters in Louisville and it creates jobs as well in China. When Tom Friedman warns that the Chinese will "eat our lunch," I'm not sure that's what he had in mind."

On the Middle East: "Consider the transitions underway in Egypt, Tunisia, and Libya. If we want to see democracy take root, which we do, we have to bring advanced tools to bear to help countries reform economic systems designed to keep autocrats and elites in power. And we know that aid alone, no matter how generous, is not enough. We need a sophisticated effort to integrate the region’s economies, to promote investment, and to assist in economic modernization. This is the logic behind the Middle East proposals that the President laid out in May, which I have been urging Congress to support. To succeed, the Arab political awakening must also be an economic awakening."

On Latin America: "we are also making it a priority to engage with the Latin American jaguars, if you can call them that, which grew by more than six percent last year. Our free trade agreements with Panama and Colombia move us closer to our ultimate goal of a hemispheric trade partnership reaching from the Arctic to the tip of Argentina."

On the Pacific Basin: "...we will continue to use the Asia Pacific Economic Cooperation Forum, which President Obama will host next month in Hawaii, to push the envelope on open, free, transparent, and fair trade across the Pacific basin."

==== Trump administration strategies ====
The Trump administration believed that previous bilateral relationships between the US and China did not benefit the US enough, so it decided to pursue a mostly unilateral attitude towards interacting with China. This new perspective became official on Oct. 4, 2018, when Vice President Pence spoke out about how China would be pressured by the United States to change its stance on a variety of issues, including discriminatory trade barriers, forced technology transfer between US and Chinese companies, and militarization of outposts in the South China Sea. According to Brookings, the Trump administration seems to have an inconsistent high-level strategy, which resulted in US government agencies creating their own strategies for interacting with China.

In particular, the Trump administration has targeted asserted unfair treatment in trade and investment policies. For instance, China requires foreign firms to make investments through creating joint ventures with Chinese companies—especially within the telecom, finance and auto industries—and subsequent transfer of technology to the domestic companies. This can undermine the intellectual property rights of these foreign firms. Furthermore, an estimated one-third of the Chinese economy consists of state-owned enterprises that can be given preferential treatment by Chinese banks and government. Some of these institutions seem to be pursuing strategic investments globally, including in free-market nations such as the US. Thus, America and other nations are urging China to eliminate favoritism for their local companies within its domestic market.

Since 2016, the US has executed multiple actions towards China in response to the above issues. First, the government has implemented tariffs on a variety of imports, such as photographic films. Also, it has heavily scrutinized Chinese-based companies that have committed economic offenses against US interests. For example, the US Department of Commerce almost fined the Chinese telecom company ZTE for violating US-Iranian sanctions. However, Trump blocked this decision because he thought too many Chinese jobs would be lost, excessively impacting US-China relations. While this displays the administration's ability to tackle any economic issues arising with China, it also exemplifies how inconsistent such reactions might be. The US also withdrew from some agreements intended to contain Chinese economic expansion, such as the Trans-Pacific Partnership.

While some believe that the Trump administration's tariffs on China may help defend American economic interests, others argue that it would escalate trade barriers between these nations and cause negative effects within the US. According to Forbes, US tariffs might be raised to impact over $200 billion worth of imports, including consumer goods and smart products (LEDs, thermometers).

=== India ===
India has engaged in economic diplomacy primarily through the use of trade and aid. For example, in order to build a stronger, more stable relationship with Bangladesh, India granted it an $800 million soft loan, and provided $200 million in aid.

India set up a development wing in its government in January 2012. The Development Partners Administration (DPA) is a primary way India uses economic diplomacy, in this case development aid, as a way to engage diplomatically. The DPA is building 50,000 housing units in Sri Lanka, a large transmission line in Puli Khumri, Afghanistan, and extends Lines of Credit projects globally, particularly in Africa.

Economic diplomacy and the DPA are very important to Indian foreign policy. As the former Indian Foreign Secretary Lalit Mansingh stated: "The fact that the DPA division is located in the ministry of external affairs shows it is in sync with our foreign policy objectives of transforming India into a global player".

=== Indonesia ===
==== Indonesia with US ====
The first Digital Technology Bilateral Dialogue between Indonesia and the United States was successfully held in San Francisco and Silicon Valley from June 10 to 13, 2024. The forum was attended by Indonesian delegates covering a wide range of stakeholders, from government representatives, state-owned enterprises (SOEs), the private sector, to academics. The main focus of the meeting was to explore the utilization of digital technology in the clean energy, telecommunications, and healthcare sectors. The organization of this dialogue has a strategic role in strengthening Indonesia's digital ecosystem, encouraging the acceleration of innovation, and expanding technology development in the country. Thiis forum opens opportunities for Indonesia to access capital, expand business networks, and obtain training to optimize the potential of the rapidly growing digital economy. Stakeholders from both countries agreed on concrete steps to deepen cooperation in digital technology, including through joint research projects, technology transfer, and enhanced digital skills training to prepare the workforce for future market demands.

==== Indonesia with Canada ====
Indonesia and Canada have affirmed their commitment to deepen bilateral economic relations through the Indonesia-Canada Comprehensive Economic Partnership Agreement (ICA-CEPA) negotiations. The agreement first began on June 21, 2021, and has now reached its eighth round which took place in Ottawa on June 24-28, 2024. In a high-level meeting between the heads of government of the two countries on September 5, 2023, a target of completing the ICA-CEPA negotiations before the end of 2024 was set. If successfully concluded, ICA-CEPA will be the first comprehensive trade agreement Indonesia has with a country in the North American region. This agreement is expected to open wider opportunities for increased investment, trade, and economic collaboration that are mutually beneficial for both countries.

==== Guatemala ====
Guatemala is a potential partner for Indonesia in strategic cooperation in the palm oil industry sector. Both countries share the same vision in fighting for sustainable and equitable palm oil diplomacy at the global level. Indonesia and Guatemala are exploring the possibility of closer cooperation by seeking Guatemala's membership in the Council of Palm Oil Producing Countries (CPOPC). Guatemala's participation in this organization is expected to strengthen the position of palm oil producing countries in facing global challenges, while encouraging more sustainable and highly competitive industry practices.

== Case studies ==
=== 2010 Nobel Peace Prize ===
In response to the 2010 Nobel Peace Prize going to Chinese dissident Liu Xiaobo from the Norwegian Nobel Committee, China froze free trade agreement negotiations with Norway and imposed new veterinary inspections on imports of Norwegian salmon. This caused the volume of salmon imports from Norway to shrink by 60% in 2011.

=== 2012 Incident with the Philippines in the South China Sea ===
Recently, China has become more assertive in its claim that the South China Sea is part of its territory. This has caused several disputes with the seven sovereign states who also claim part of the South China Sea as their own territory. In one such dispute, China and the Philippines engaged in a standoff over the Scarborough Shoal in which Navy vessels were sent in. In retaliation to this territorial conflict, China engaged in coercive economic diplomacy by blocking Philippine bananas from entering Chinese ports, as well as slowing down the inspections of papayas, mangoes, coconuts, and pineapples from the Philippines. Philippine businessmen pressured their government to stand down. According to Manila, Chinese Vessels now block the entrance to the lagoon, preventing any Philippine ships from entering, in another example of China using coercive economic diplomacy.

== See also ==
- Commercial diplomacy
- Defence diplomacy
- Economic warfare
- Energy diplomacy
- Medical diplomacy
- Public diplomacy
- Soft power
