= Commercial diplomacy =

Diplomacy focused on development of business between two countries

Commercial diplomacy is diplomacy that focuses on development of business between two countries. It aims at generating commercial gains in the form of trade and inward and outward investment by means of business and entrepreneurship promotion and facilitation activities in the host country. Commercial diplomacy is pursued with the goal of gaining economic stability, welfare, or competitive advantage.

As a term, "commercial diplomacy" emerged in the second half of the twentieth century (e.g., Joseph, 1965; Corbet, 1972), but the concept existed in previous centuries. In literature the concepts of economic diplomacy and commercial diplomacy are often used interchangeably. Definitions of both concepts vary, and consequently the relationship between them is also described differently. Some authors argue that commercial diplomacy is a subset of economic diplomacy. However, both kinds of diplomacy are "irrevocably intertwined" and thus "distinct [but] obviously closely related to [each other]".

== Purpose ==
Commercial diplomacy emphasizes the government's role, being defined as "a government service to the business community, which aims at the development of socially beneficial international business ventures". It is "the work of diplomatic missions in support of the home country's business and finance sectors and includes the promotion of inward and outward investment, as well as trade". Commercial diplomacy thus includes "all aspects of business support and promotion" including investment, tourism, R&D, and intellectual property.

Commercial diplomacy is designed to influence foreign government policy and regulatory decisions that affect global trade, investment and commerce. It is concerned with government regulations and actions that affect international commerce—including standards in areas such as health, safety, the environment, and consumer protection; regulations covering services such as banking, telecommunications and accounting; competition policy and laws concerning bribery and corruption; agricultural support programs; and industrial subsidies. Potter (2004) argues that commercial diplomacy is a value-creating activity due to its usefulness in dealing with managerial and government concerns.

In this context, commercial diplomacy is profitable in that it makes exporting and operating abroad easier; it is a valuable instrument for export promotion and operating abroad; it enables companies to perform tasks abroad more quickly and increases the amount of exports and company results by providing information about rules, regulations, culture, public tenders and the market of the host country; by providing support during the partner search; and by providing assistance in trade disputes, fairs, and missions. Especially for companies that have financial limitations, access to reliable information and a broad network abroad are essential.

== Activities ==
Traditional commercial diplomacy activities include facilitating, negotiating, promoting and arbitrating international trade, investment, intellectual property and commerce, and advocating Responsible Commercial Diplomacy (RCD), together with networking, capacity building, intelligence, image campaigns and support. These activities are shown in the table below.

Network activities	Intelligence	Image campaigns	Support
Developing business and government contacts	Gathering and disseminating commercial information	Promoting goods and services	In negotiations; contract implementation and problem-solving
State visits	Market research	Participating in trade fairs, introducing potential exporters	Gathering export marketing data
Buyer-seller meetings	Reporting to home country	Sensitizing potential foreign investors	Supervision of violations of IPRs and contracts
Match-making	Consultant to both countries	Gathering export marketing data	Advocacy
Search for partners, distributors, investors, lawyers	Image studies, joint scientific research	Tourism promotion	Coordination of legal action
Personal network		Awareness campaigns	

Other activities for commercial diplomacy and rationales that companies need are: need for access to reliable and neutral business information; credibility and image support in foreign markets; partner search; conflict handling; support of home country delegations (state missions); strategic concerns (e.g., energy).

== See also ==
- Defence diplomacy
- Economic diplomacy
- Energy diplomacy
- Medical diplomacy
- Public diplomacy
