= Medical diplomacy =

Medical diplomacy or public health diplomacy is a form of diplomacy. It is the provision of medical assistance, including vaccines, or aid for the purpose of furthering national goals. It is often considered to be a form of soft power but it has various harder aspects.

== History ==
Medical diplomacy related to the COVID-19 pandemic was often termed “mask diplomacy” due to surgical masks being the primary good transferred. It has spurred new global players to enter this space, such as Russia which sent medical personnel to Italy at the onset of the current crisis in a mission called “From Russia with Love”.

"COVID diplomacy" was most clearly demonstrated between China and the ASEAN countries. Shortly after the beginning of the COVID-19 pandemic ASEAN's multi- and bilateral public health coordination intensified with the ASEAN Senior Officials Meeting on Health Development and within the ASEAN+3 framework which includes China, Japan, and South Korea.

== By country ==
=== Cuba ===
Medical diplomacy is a cornerstone of Cuban foreign policy. Cuba has engaged in medical diplomacy since the 1960s.

=== China ===
China's early success in responding to the COVID-19 pandemic facilitated its "mask diplomacy." Chinese ownership of much of the global medical supply chain enhanced its ability to send doctors and medical equipment to suffering countries. China soon followed its "mask diplomacy" with "vaccine diplomacy." China's infection rates were sufficiently low that it could send vaccines abroad without domestic objections. As academic Suisheng Zhao writes, "Just by showing up and helping plug the colossal gaps in the global supply, China gained ground."

The Chinese hospital ship Daishan Dao has engaged in a number of medical diplomacy missions. China's support of the WHO has also been categorized as medical diplomacy.

China offered public health and economic assistance to India in response to the COVID-19 pandemic, although India refused per the United States' request.

=== Taiwan ===
Taiwan has engaged in medical diplomacy since 1961. Under the New Southbound Policy, Taiwan is focused on providing high-level professional skill transfers instead of direct medical care or basic public health programs. During the current COVID-19 pandemic, Taiwan has ramped up its efforts and donated millions of masks to its diplomatic allies as well as to close friends across the world. It also launched a hospital ship through the Pacific, providing ventilators and masks to countries like Palau that were unable to obtain medical help from other sources.

=== United States ===
In the United States, medical diplomacy is handled both by the State Department section for Public Diplomacy and Public Affairs as well as the Department of Health and Human Services’ Office of Global Affairs. The United States also practices medical diplomacy as part of defense diplomacy.

== See also ==
- Economic diplomacy
- Public diplomacy
- Defence diplomacy
- Commercial diplomacy
- Energy diplomacy
- Public diplomacy
