= Petrostate =

Countries that primarily produce oil or natural gas

A petrostate, oil state or petrocracy is a polity whose economy is heavily dependent on the extraction and export of oil or natural gas. Petrostates are conventionally independent nations; however writers like Samuel Weston and Andrew Nikiforuk describe major oil-producing subnational entities like Wyoming, Alberta and Louisiana as also petrostates. A petromonarchy or oil monarchy is a petrostate run by a dynastic absolute monarch; one run by another type of autocrat is a petro-dictatorship.

The presence alone of large oil and gas industries does not define a petrostate: major oil producers that also have diversified economies are not classified as petrostates due to their ability to generate income from various industries and sectors beyond the oil industry. Petrostates typically have highly concentrated political and economic power, resting in the hands of an elite, as well as unaccountable political institutions that are susceptible to corruption.

== Countries considered to be petrostates ==
Various countries have been identified as current or former petrostates:

- Algeria
- Angola
- Azerbaijan
- Brunei
- Cameroon
- Chad
- Ecuador
- Equatorial Guinea
- Guyana
- Indonesia
- Iran
- Iraq
- Kazakhstan
- Kuwait
- Libya
- Mexico
- Nigeria
- Norway
- Oman
- Qatar
- Republic of the Congo
- Russia
- Saudi Arabia
- Trinidad and Tobago
- Turkmenistan
- United Arab Emirates
- Uzbekistan
- Venezuela

== Economy ==
Petrostates rely on oil as a primary source of income, which can make their economies vulnerable to fluctuations in oil prices. When oil prices are high, they tend to thrive, but they can struggle during periods of low oil prices. The reliance on oil and natural gas may preclude the development of other industries, known as Dutch disease. Light industries, including textiles and clothing, are key factors that drive women to participate in the workforce. Petrostates thus often have lower rates of female workers, which can impede women's access to social and political freedoms.

Petrostates are typified by weak economies, where products are more frequently imported than domestically produced. Diversification can successfully occur in limited circumstances, such as Mexico becoming part of the North American Free Trade Agreement, or Dubai leveraging its location to become a hub of commerce and tourism. Most petrostates do not attempt economic diversification, instead seeking economic domination through large, state-owned oil companies.

== Governance ==
Petrostates are characterised by an extreme abundance of non-tax revenue and typically extremely low or often zero direct taxes. This is because the extremely capital-intensive nature of oil and natural gas extraction means that negotiation between corporations and government is uniquely important to the development of these resources. Moreover, unlike direct taxes, oil revenue is amassed without developing networks with citizens. Petrostates, it is argued, depend upon their rentier dynamic and could not survive if they lose access to these rents.

In some petrostates, leaders and governments may become more authoritarian as they accumulate significant wealth and power through the control of the oil sector. They may use these resources to maintain political control, suppress opposition, and stifle democratic institutions. For example, Steven Fish identifies oil wealth as one of the major reasons for Russia's failed democratization. He explains that revenue from oil exports fueled corruption, and corruption, in turn, hampered Russia's political liberalization. Furthermore, he notes that Britain's and Norway's resource wealth did not lead to authoritarianism because "sturdy democratic regimes" were already in place. Similarly, Michael Ross argues that "the case of Russia since 1998 illustrates how oil revenues can endanger a weak democracy by boosting the popularity of an elected incumbent, who gradually removes checks and balances on their own authority".

In many petrostates, rulers invest in social welfare programs, including healthcare, education, and subsidies for essential goods. For example, Kuwait, Saudi Arabia, United Arab Emirates, and Qatar have invested in education, healthcare, and public amenities to improve the quality of life for their citizens.

=== International influence ===
Successful, stable democracies are the worst possible outcome for authoritarian petrostates, since they are potentially less subservient to the extremely wealthy petrostate rulers and could inspire similar examples elsewhere including within the petrostates themselves. Petrostate wealth may thus contribute to international democratic backsliding: when stable authoritarian regimes within their sphere of influence become unviable, the oil states either support even autocratic rulers not otherwise allied with them, or allow or even encourage the nations in question to collapse into permanent conflict.

Remittances from petrostates may also stabilise autocratic regimes in nations whose citizens provide cheap expatriate labour. These remittances can be captured as indirect taxes by governments otherwise extremely short of capital, and allow the ruling elites of the labour-supplying countries cheaper consumer goods. Authoritarian petrostates are also known to be models of governance for right-wing populist rulers and for wealthy corporations seeking a system of rule without taxes or democracy.

== Resource curse ==
Global energy prices can cause turbulent and unpredictable swings in a petrostate's economy. Undiversified reliance on oil and gas industries can cause political and economic crises when the price of oil drops. Over-investment in these industries at the expense of other sectors, such as manufacturing and agriculture, can hurt economic growth and competitiveness. Petrostates can suffer from the resource curse, meaning that their abundance of natural resources can have detrimental impacts on other parts of the economy, as well as negative social and political impacts.

Petrostates, it has been argued, see increasing inequality with increasing wealth, because they do not depend upon the labour of their inhabitants but upon a tiny elite's luck in owning their valuable resources. It is also argued that they have no incentives to abide by rules regarding reduction of greenhouse gas emissions, and that consuming states have no ability to control the polluting petrostates.

== Environmental and climate concerns ==
The extraction and production of oil can have significant environmental and ecological impacts, including pollution, habitat destruction, and greenhouse gas emissions. This can lead to environmental concerns and criticism, both domestically and internationally.

Recent studies challenge the assumption that the transition to sustainable energy will lead to the decline of petrostates, suggesting that their future depends on production costs and social factors. Furthermore, the low-carbon transition might provide new export opportunities for petrostates as energy-intensive sectors in developed countries decrease, potentially leading some, particularly in the Middle East, to further specialize in high-carbon sectors.

Since the 2022 Russian invasion of Ukraine, Alexander Etkind has suggested that petrostates are engaging in wars because of the existential economic threat decarbonization poses to their rulers' power and wealth. He also argues that petrostates pay absolutely nothing for the emissions and costs of climate change their oil creates abroad, nor for the emissions produced by burning oil at home. The corporate identity of state-owned oil and gas corporations has also helped insulate petrostates from requirements to restrict fossil fuel production and caused them to attempt to claim that continued fossil fuel production can be decoupled from greenhouse gas emissions. This is in spite of serious impacts of climate change in many extremely rich petrostates: they have tended to avoid playing the victim and to align with other, less affected major polluters even when severely threatened. Russia and other Central Asian petrostates also have begun in recent years to lead a powerful backlash against movements to decarbonise in the European Union.

== Cultural narratives ==
The presence of a booming oil industry influences a nation's cultural landscape. It may manifest in conspicuous consumption, urban development, and the emergence of specific cultural symbols associated with wealth and status.

The petrostate narrative often becomes intertwined with the national identity, notably in Russia and in Saudi Arabia. The story of an oil-rich nation can influence collective memory and national pride. Cultural narratives might emphasize self-reliance, economic strength, or the role of oil in nation-building.

== See also ==
- Big Oil
- Electrostate
- Energy superpower
- Oil war
- Rentier state
