= Electrostate =

Country that uses electricity as its primary energy source

An electrostate is a polity that uses electricity as the primary source of energy for its economy, rather than fossil fuels. In some analyses, the term is extended to include states that also dominate renewable energy supply chains for critical minerals such as lithium, cobalt, nickel, and rare earths, develops renewable technologies such as solar, batteries, and electric vehicles, and supports the widespread deployment of these technologies.

As a neologism, the exact definition is still under debate, with some sources distinguishing between producer electrostates and consumer electrostates. The Carnegie Endowment for International Peace (CEIP) defines the producer electrostate as a country that exports renewable energy technologies, such as solar panels, batteries, electric vehicles, and grid equipment. Their derives from control over the clean‑energy manufacturing capacity, technology standards, and critical mineral supply chains. Whereas a consumer electrostate has a highly electrified economy powered by renewable energy. Energy think tank Ember defines an electrostates as a country where national energy security and economic activity depend on both the expansion of renewable electricity generation and the electrification of final energy consumption in sectors such as transport, heating, and industry. Both conditions are required for the reduction in exposure to fuel‑price volatility and import dependence.

== Background ==
China is widely identified as the first electrostate, both producing and consuming vast amounts of renewable technologies and energy, dominating clean-tech manufacturing and critical mineral value chains, and engaged in rapid domestic electrification, effectively replacing the "petrostate" model with an electron-driven geopolitical, financial, and industrial economy.

Other nations are also laying the foundations for the electrostate status through green energy transition and expansions, either by importing renewable technologies for deployment or by building up manufacturing capacity themselves.

Developing countries could increase their rates of electrification and clean energy adoption more quickly than developed economies because they have access to cheaper renewable technologies that were not previously available, effectively allowing them to bypass the intensive coal and oil-based stage of development while growing their economies.

== Motivations ==
Countries may transition to an electrostate model for reasons such as environmental protection, additional energy capacity, economic benefits, better energy efficiency, energy security, reduction in imported energy cost, and energy independence, to avoid negative impacts from fossil fuel markets or geopolitical pressure from fossil fuel producers.

== Implications ==
The proliferation of electrotech also has economic and geopolitical impacts. It could weaken petrostates' trading power and their global influence. As the world becomes increasingly electrified, electrostates will be embedded within national economies across markets, especially developing countries, offering an alternative while reducing the leverage that petrostates have over the global energy structure. Nils Gilman, written for the Foreign Policy, aruged the power dynamics between electrostates and petrostates could lead to an eco-ideological cold war in the 21st century, where both sides competing for energy systems.

The transition to an electrostate model alters the dynamics of energy security. Unlike the petrostate framework, where energy security depends on continuous flows of fuel and is therefore vulnerable to the entanglement and volatility of fossil fuel supply chains, renewable energy systems' primary energy sources, such as solar and wind power, cannot be blockaded or disrupted in the same way once the infrastructure is established. This technological shift could also introduces new risks, including dependence on China's clean energy technologies, manufacturing, and supply chains, potential disruptions in access to critical minerals, and reliance on the domestic grid infrastructure.

== See also ==
- Climate politics
- Energy security
- Energy independence
- Petrostate
- Renewable energy
