= Fossil fuel exporters =

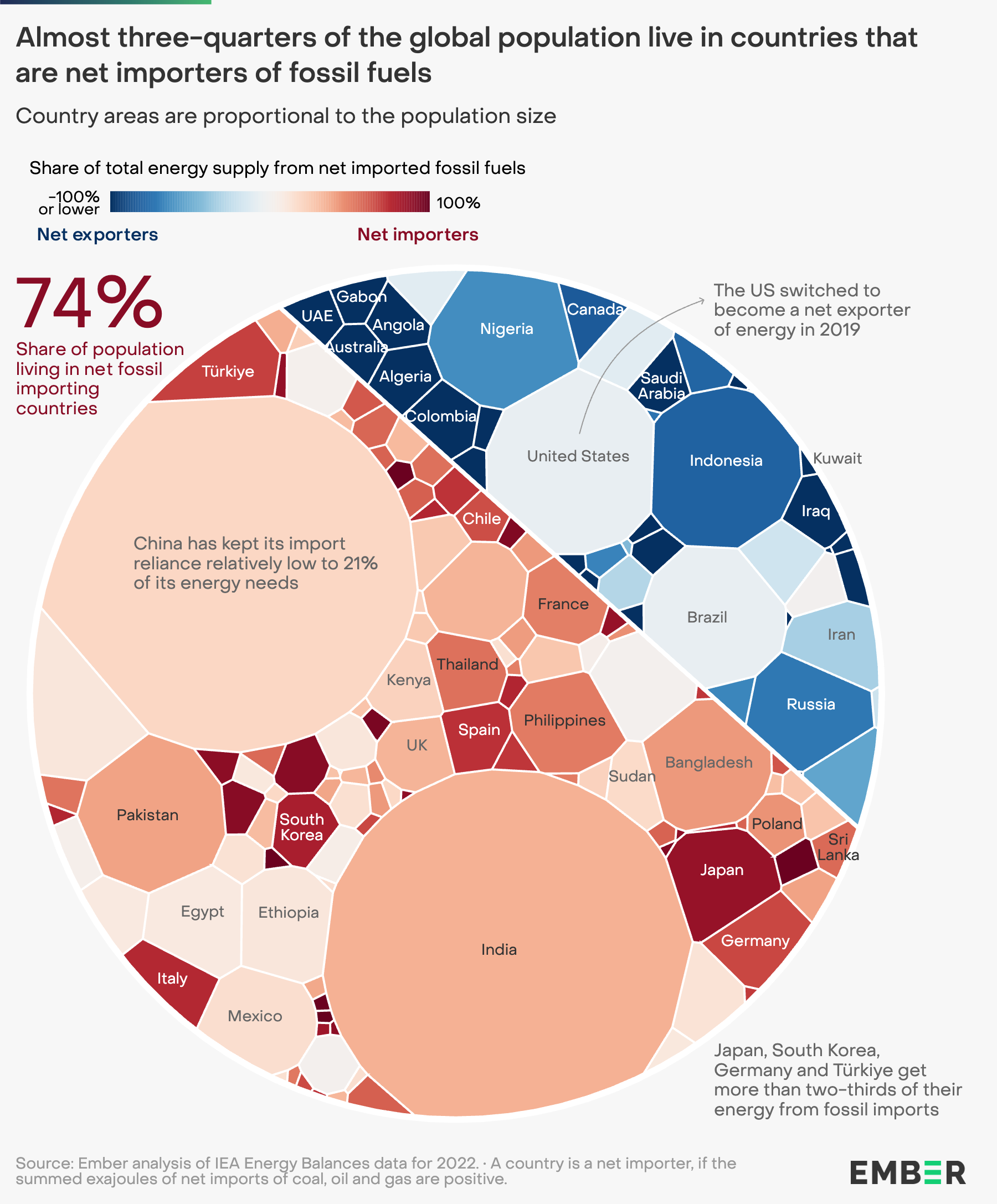
Almost three-quarters of the global population live in countries that are net importers of fossil fuels.

Petroleum, natural gas, and coal are exported from various source countries to countries reliant on these fossil fuels. Fossil fuel exports are dominated by a relatively small group of countries, many of which derive a significant portion of their export revenues and government income from these resources.

According to Climate Action Tracker, in 2022 the ten largest fossil fuel exporters are responsible for roughly 60% of all exported fossil fuel emissions. Russia contributes the most to global emissions from fossil fuel exports overall, due to its large exports of oil, gas, and coal. Australia and Indonesia are major coal exporters, while the United States leads in emissions from gas exports and Saudi Arabia in those from oil. Together, the top six exporters (Russia, Australia, the US, Indonesia, Saudi Arabia, and Canada) account for half of all fossil fuel export-related emissions.

Coal trade was expected to reach an all-time high in 2024. Asia Pacific accounting for 84% of global coal imports in 2023.

== Petroleum ==
This is a list of countries by oil exports - mostly based on The World Factbook:

Rank	Country/region	Oil - exports	Date of information
1	Saudi Arabia	6,658,642 bbl/d (1,058,639.5 m^{3}/d)	2020 est.
2	Russia	4,653,500 bbl/d (739,850 m^{3}/d)	2020 est.
3	Iraq	3,428,379 bbl/d (545,068.7 m^{3}/d)	2020 est.
4	Canada	3,037,668 bbl/d (482,950.6 m^{3}/d)	2020
5	Iran	2,700,000 bbl/d (430,000 m^{3}/d)	2021 est.
6	United Arab Emirates	2,418,388 bbl/d (384,493.0 m^{3}/d)	2020
7	Nigeria	1,879,288 bbl/d (298,782.9 m^{3}/d)	2020
8	Kuwait	1,826,331 bbl/d (290,363.4 m^{3}/d)	2020
9	Norway	1,501,768 bbl/d (238,762.0 m^{3}/d)	2020
10	Kazakhstan	1,410,917 bbl/d (224,317.9 m^{3}/d)	2019 est.

== Natural gas ==
This is a list of countries by natural gas exports - mostly based on The World Factbook:

Rank	Country/region	Natural gas - exports (cu m)	Date of information
1	Russia	199,928,345,000	2020 est.
2	United States	149,538,000,000	2020 est.
3	Qatar	143,700,000,000	2020 est.
4	Norway	112,951,000,000	2020 est.
5	Australia	102,262,000,000	2020 est.
6	Canada	70,932,000,000	2020 est.
7	Germany	50,092,000,000	2020 est.
8	Netherlands	39,976,000,000	2020 est.
9	Algeria	39,459,000,000	2020 est.
10	Nigeria	35,586,138,000	2020 est.

== Coal ==
In 2024, the total for all countries was estimated as 1,688,137 thousand short tons. This is a list of countries by coal exports - mostly based on US Energy Information Administration:

Rank	Country	Coal - exports (thousand short tons)	Date of information
1	Indonesia	614,821	2024
2	Australia	399,082	2024
3	Russia	200,601	2024
4	United States	108326	2024
5	Mongolia	82,345	2024
6	South Africa	77,936	2024
7	Colombia	49,761	2024
8	Canada	40,000	2024
9	Kazakhstan	26,271	2024
10	Mozambique	17,843	2024
