= Defence diplomacy =

Peaceful use of defence resources in foreign policy

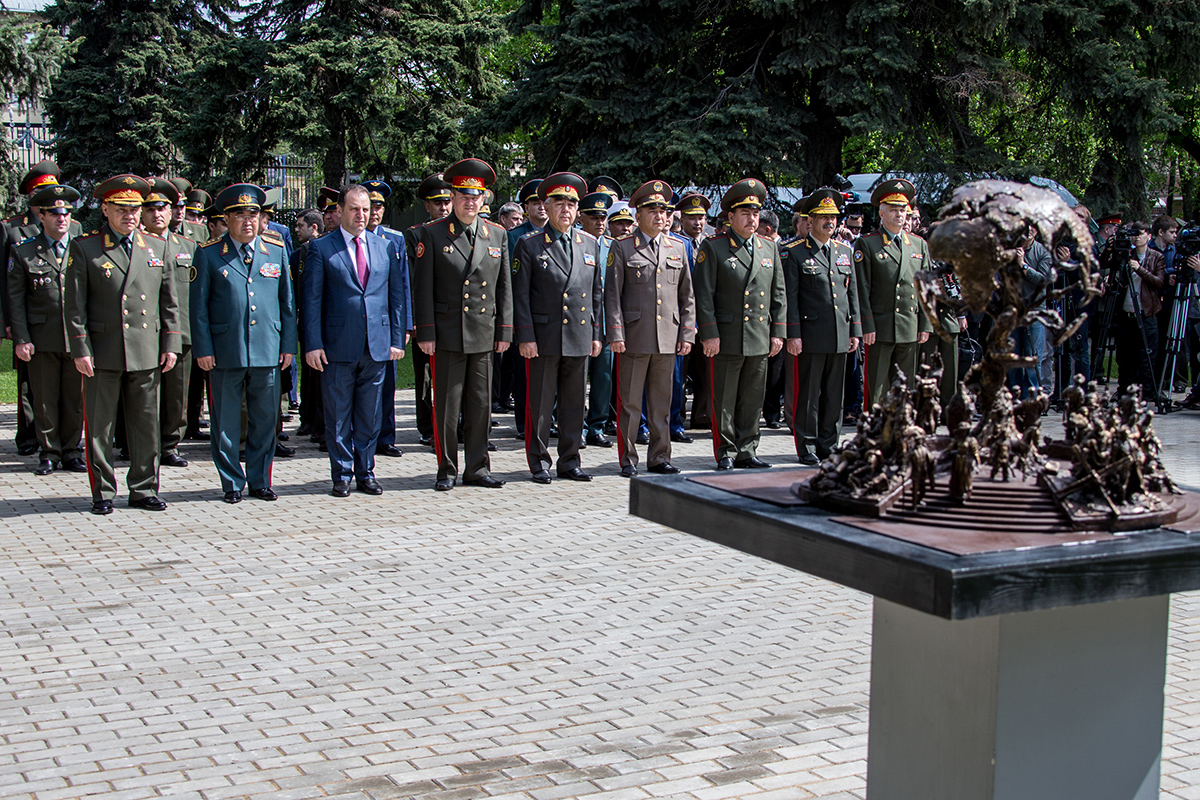
The Council of Ministers of Defense of the CIS (members of which are seen here) is a common example of defence diplomacy in practice.

In international relations, defence diplomacy (also known as military diplomacy), refers to the pursuit of foreign policy objectives through the peaceful employment of defence resources and capabilities.

== Origin of concept ==
Defence diplomacy as an organizing concept for defence-related international activity has its origin in post-Cold War reappraisals of Western defence establishments, led by the United Kingdom Ministry of Defence, and was a principle “used to help the West come to terms with the new international security environment.” While the term originated in the West, the conduct of defence diplomacy is by no means confined to Western countries.

== Development ==
Defence diplomacy can be understood as the peaceful application of resources from across the spectrum of defence to achieve positive outcomes in the development of a country's bilateral and multilateral relationships. "Military diplomacy" is a subset that tends to refer only to the role of military attachés and their associated activity. Defence diplomacy does not include military operations but subsumes such other defence activity as international personnel exchanges, ship and aircraft visits, high-level engagement (such as ministers and senior defence personnel), bilateral meetings and staff talks, training and exercises, regional defence forums (such as Shangri-La Dialogue, Halifax Forum), outreach, confidence and security building measures, and non-proliferation activities.

The United Kingdom identified defence diplomacy as one of the military's eight defence missions, and aims to “dispel hostility, build and maintain trust and assist in the development of democratically accountable armed forces” to make a “significant contribution to conflict prevention and resolution.” Defence diplomacy is often developed and implemented in close coordination with the foreign and development ministries to ensure coherence and focus across government.

Major General Ng Chee Khern, Air Force Chief of the Republic of Singapore, summed it up thus: "In defence diplomacy, we seek to develop mutually beneficial relationships with friendly countries and armed forces to contribute to a stable international and regional environment."

Defence diplomacy is often associated with conflict prevention and security sector reform. It is distinct from the concept of gunboat diplomacy, which is generally understood to be motivated by a desire to intimidate potential adversaries.

== See also ==
- Military attaché
- Medical diplomacy
- Economic diplomacy
- Public diplomacy
