= Vaccine diplomacy =

Use of vaccines as international diplomacy

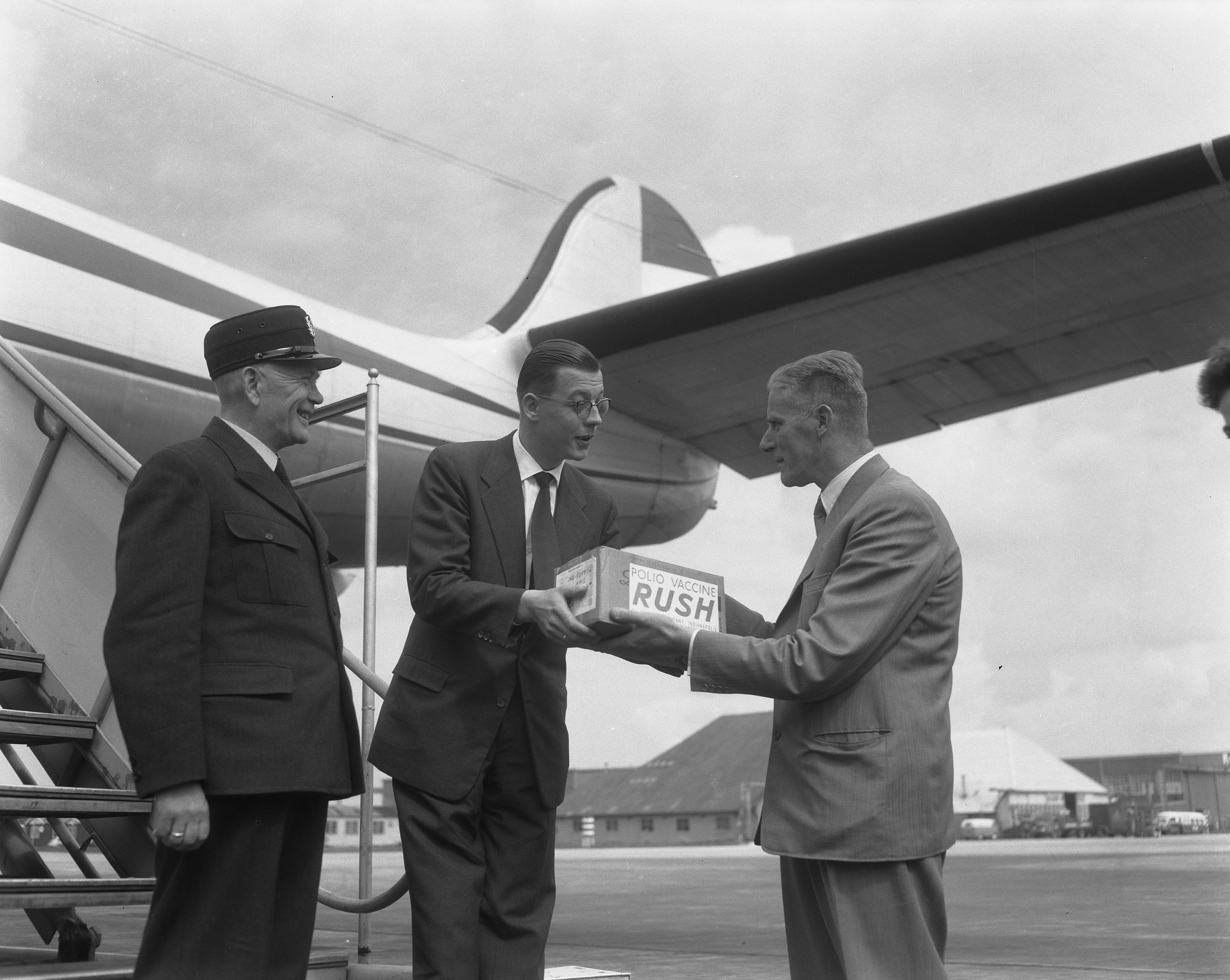
Arrival of Salk Polio Vaccine from the United States at Amsterdam Airport Schiphol in 1957.

Vaccine diplomacy, a form of medical diplomacy, is the use of vaccines to improve a country's diplomatic relationship and influence of other countries. Meanwhile, vaccine diplomacy also "means a set of diplomatic measures taken to ensure access to the best practices in the development of potential vaccines, to enhance bilateral and/or multilateral cooperation between countries in conducting joint R&D, and, in the case of the announcement of production, to ensure the signing of a contract for the purchase of the vaccine at the shortest term." Although primarily discussed in the context of the supply of COVID-19 vaccines, it also played a part in the distribution of the smallpox vaccine.

== Early history of vaccine diplomacy ==
Commentators have identified vaccine diplomacy occurring as far back as the first vaccine, Edward Jenner's smallpox vaccine. It has also been identified in Soviet involvement with the Albert Sabin polio vaccine. The UN has also brokered ceasefires in order to conduct vaccination campaigns such as with the Taliban in Afghanistan.

== During the COVID-19 pandemic ==
=== Australia ===
Australia promised to ensure early access to a vaccine "for countries in our Pacific family, as well as regional partners in Southeast Asia". to help them fight the COVID-19 pandemic.

=== China ===
China's infection rates and early success in handling the COVID-19 pandemic were sufficiently low that it could send vaccines abroad without domestic objections. By August 2021, China had donated 700 million vaccine doses abroad, greater than the number from all other countries combined. As academic Suisheng Zhao writes, "Just by showing up and helping plug the colossal gaps in the global supply, China gained ground." Moreover, the Center for Strategic and International Studies found that its vaccine diplomatic activities earned China goodwill and influence in several middle-income countries, many of which are also notably involved in the Belt and Road Initiative, indicating that such diplomacy could have improved China's image and strengthened its relationships with countries that wished for, or already took part in, strong relationships with China. However, because most of Chinese distributed vaccines have gone to such middle-income countries, many of the poorest countries are left highly vulnerable, undercutting China's attempts to present itself as a benevolent giver of needed goods and undermining Xi's claim that a Chinese developed vaccine would be treated as a "global public good."

The Sinopharm BIBP vaccine is used for vaccinations by some countries in Asia, Africa, South America, and Europe. Sinopharm produced one billion doses of the BBIB vaccine in 2021, and supplied 200 million doses by May.

CoronaVac is used for vaccinations by some countries in Asia, South America, North America, and Europe. Sinovac had a production capacity of 2 billion doses a year and had delivered 600 million total doses.

Convidecia is used for vaccination by some countries in Asia, Europe, and Latin America. Production capacity for Ad5-NCov should reach 500 million doses in 2021.

China pledged US$2 billion to support efforts by WHO for programs against COVID-19, a US$1 billion loan to make its vaccine accessible for countries in Latin America and the Caribbean, and provide five Southeast Asian countries priority access to the vaccine. The Sinopharm BIBP vaccine and CoronaVac were approved by the WHO as part of COVAX. By July 2021, GAVI had signed advanced purchase agreements for 170 million doses of the Sinopharm BIBP vaccine, 350 million doses of CoronaVac, and 414 million doses of SCB-2019, another COVID-19 vaccine in Phase III trials.

All of these actions have been a component in enacting China's strategy of enacting mask diplomacy, where the state has distributed medical supplies, including COVID-19 vaccines, and financial support to other European countries, in an effort to restore China's historically maligned and recently ignominious image. While on the other hand, these actions have demonstrated that China is a pragmatic, self-driven problem solver, willing to establish alliances with other nations contrasting the United States' isolationist policies.

=== India ===
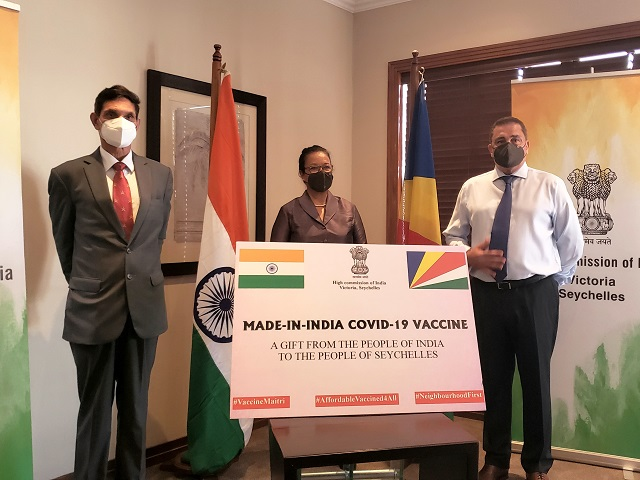
India sent COVID-19 vaccine to Seychelles under the Vaccine Maitri Program.

By late March 2021, India had produced 125 million doses of COVID-19 vaccines and had exported 55 million doses. 84 countries had received vaccines from India, either through COVAX, grants or regular purchases.

India sent millions of doses of COVID-19 vaccine to 95 countries including neighboring Bhutan, Afghanistan, Nepal, Bangladesh, Sri Lanka, Myanmar and the Maldives. India will also supply vaccines to Pakistan through COVAX initiative.

During the second wave of the COVID-19 pandemic in India, the Vaccine Maitri program was put on hold until July 2021 due to increased number of COVID cases in India. As of 29 May 2021, India had exported 66.4 million doses including 10.7 million vaccine provided as grant to more than 95 nations.

India's health ministry said the country will resume COVID-19 vaccine exports as a part of COVAX and Vaccine Maitri initiative, by October, promising supply development that comes ahead of high-level talks this week on solving vaccine inequity gaps, while World Health Organization chief Tedros Adhanom Ghebreyesus has hailed India's decision to resume COVID-19 vaccine exports as an "important development" in support of the goal to reach 40 per cent vaccination in all countries by end of the year.

=== Mexico ===
Secretary of Foreign Affairs of Mexico Marcelo Ebrard announced agreements with CanSino Biologics and Walvax to conduct clinical trials for vaccines from China, with the possibility of the manufacturing the vaccines in the country.

Marcelo Ebrard also announced agreements with Johnson & Johnson to trial its U.S. developed vaccine in Mexico.

=== Japan ===
In July 2020, Japan agreed to provide 11.6 billion yen (US$109 million) to five countries along the Mekong River: Cambodia, Laos, Myanmar, Thailand and Vietnam over concerns with China's influence on vaccine production and distribution in Asia.

=== Russia ===
Russia, the first country to claim a COVID-19 vaccine, Sputnik V, says twenty countries "including Brazil, Indonesia and the United Arab Emirates" have requested access.

=== Turkey ===
Turkey has sent or donated CoronaVac vaccines to Azerbaijan, Bosnia and Herzegovina, Northern Cyprus, and North Macedonia.

=== United States ===
During the Trump administration, Secretary of Health and Human Services Alex Azar said the United States will share a vaccine with other countries only after the United States' needs have been met. The United States has funded and placed multi-billion dollar orders purchasing hundreds of millions of vaccines from the United Kingdom's AstraZeneca and Germany's BioNTech SE in collaboration with American Pfizer. The United States offered vaccine development to Indonesia in an August 2020 phone call between Mike Pompeo and Retno Marsudi.

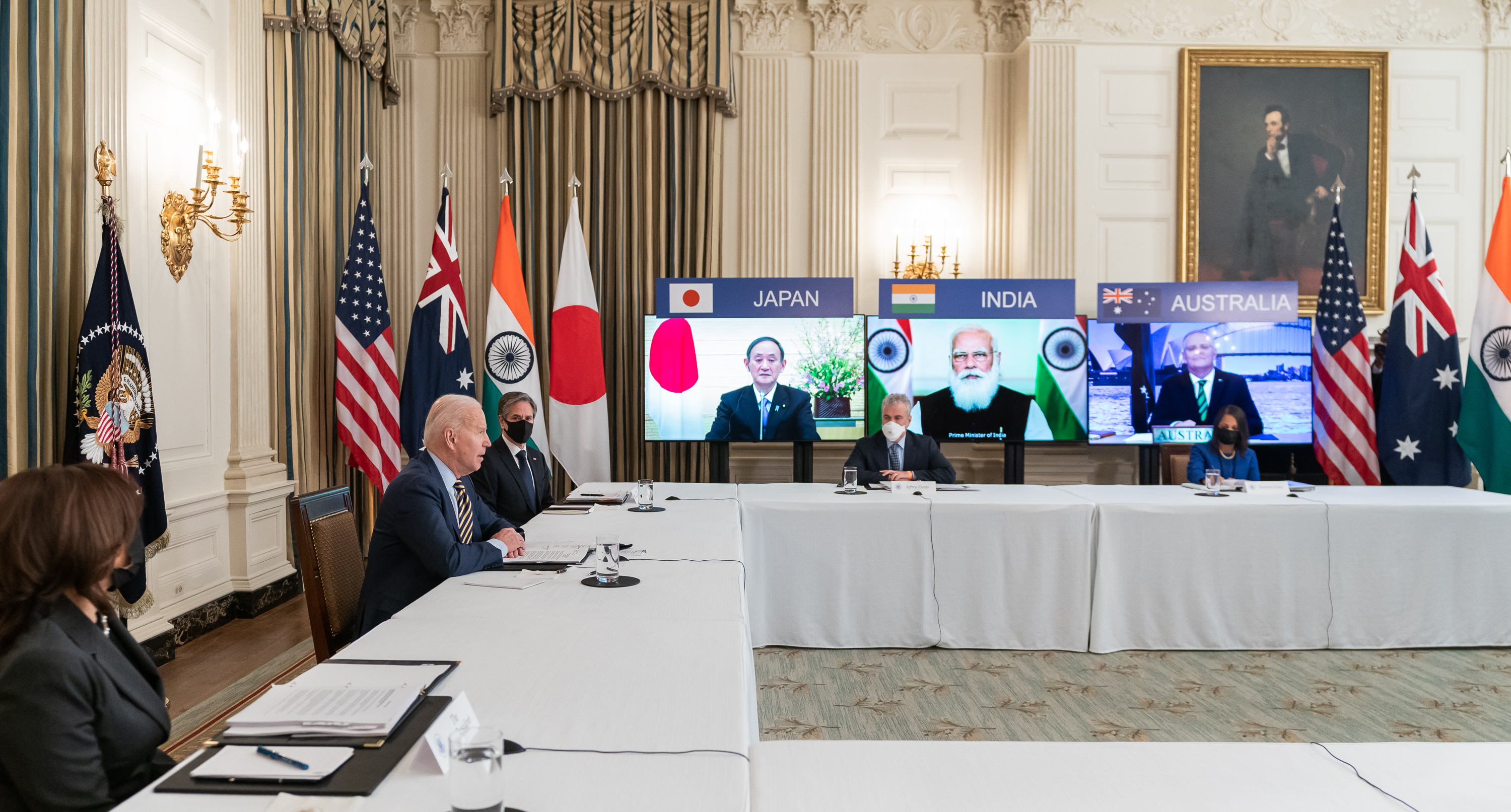
President Biden in the Quad summit (with Japan, India, Australia Leaders)

The Biden administration has promised to finance vaccine manufacturing in various nations with its announcement in the Quad Summit held in March 2021 that it will provide supply of up to one billion coronavirus vaccines across Asia by the end of 2022 along with India, Australia and Japan. The United States vaccine export policies have been criticised as "Vaccine Apartheid" by The Independent.

=== European Union ===
UK-based AstraZeneca was accused of prioritizing the UK market and when their EU vaccine production lagged behind the UK. Diplomatic protests from the Irish and UK sides resolved the matter and the threat was withdrawn. In March 2021, the EU planned to suspend vaccine exports once again in order to incentivize the UK to export its domestic vaccine production.

=== Vaccine nationalism ===
This led to fears about vaccine nationalism, where developed countries would benefit in producing home-grown vaccine and poorer countries would not get access to the vaccine as soon, ultimately prolonging the pandemic. A similar phenomenon was observed during the H1N1 Flu and Ebola crisis. During the pandemic situation, there is a "diplomatic race ... for potential vaccines."

Another concern has been that wealthier countries would gain prioritized access to vaccines based on their ability to pay. The COVAX program was established with the intention of counteracting this development. In 2021, an unequal distribution of vaccines based on the principle of vaccine nationalism was observed between high, middle, and low income countries. An August 2021 study concluded that this behavior has resulted in increased transmission of COVID-19, especially because it encourages the development of COVID-19 variants.

=== Possible collaboration among countries ===
In early August 2020, Malaysian Minister of Foreign Affairs Hishammuddin Hussein said on Twitter that he had spoken with both Chinese Foreign Minister Wang Yi and United States Secretary of State Mike Pompeo on methods to further collaboration on vaccines.

== See also ==
- Aid
- Soft power
- Science diplomacy
- Science diplomacy and pandemics
