= MVSL =

MVSL may refer to:

- Martha's Vineyard Sign Language
- Maldives Sign Language
- Maghreb Virtual Science Library
