= Science diplomacy and pandemics =

Science diplomacy is the collaborative efforts by local and global entities to solve global issues using science and technology as a base. In science diplomacy, collaboration takes place to advance science but science can also be used to facilitate diplomatic relations. This allows even conflicting nations to come together through science to find solutions to global issues. Global organizations, researchers, public health officials, countries, government officials, and clinicians have previously worked together to create effective measures of infection control and subsequent treatment. They continue to do so through sharing of resources, research data, ideas, and by putting into effect laws and regulations that can further advance scientific research. Without the collaborative efforts of such entities, the world would not have the vaccines and treatments we now possess for diseases that were once considered deadly such as tuberculosis, tetanus, polio, influenza, etc. Historically, science diplomacy has proved successful in diseases such as SARS, Ebola, Zika and continues to be relevant during the COVID-19 pandemic today.

== Plague, yellow fever, and cholera ==
Following the Congress of Vienna in 1815, a new era of international trade and cooperation began in Europe. The Habsburg Empire, the United Kingdom, Russia, and Prussia, as the victors, used their power to enforce quarantines. They met weekly in Paris and prevented the spread of plague and yellow fever in Europe.

Outbreaks of plague and cholera in the Ottoman Empire led to the creation of the Constantinople Council of Health, which included European members. Plague was endemic to the Ottoman Empire at this point, so the Austrian Empire had a border zone with the Ottoman Empire and did not allow passage except at places where quarantine was possible. The Ottoman Empire used European knowledge to decrease the spread of disease.

While quarantine became a common practice by the mid-fifteenth century, it was frequently used to further political ends. Even though it was unclear whether quarantine was effective, it was still used by European states during an outbreak of cholera in European Russia in 1830. Quarantine measures were highly impacted by commercial interests, however.

The government of Louis Phillipe in France suggested international guidelines for quarantine to prevent their use for political gain. M. de Segur Dupeyron, as part of this government, studied quarantine and found that outbreaks of plague were directly tied to commerce. As such, quarantines were effective, but their unsystematic nature made them unduly oppressive. He suggested banning arbitrary increases in quarantines.

The French government took heed and spent many years attempting to arrange an international meeting. The first International Sanitary Conference occurred in 1851. It lasted six months. However, different nations had different goals: England and France wanted a decrease in quarantines to promote their commercial and colonial interests while Mediterranean countries wanted to maintain quarantines for their recognized public benefit. Much of the convention was spent debating whether cholera was contagious and whether quarantines were effective against cholera. The convention was signed by only France, Portugal, and Sardinia.

There were a total of nine International Sanitary Conferences that focused on cholera, occurring from 1851 to 1894. Eventually, the International Sanitary Conferences led to the formation of the World Health Organization in 1948.

== 1918 Influenza Pandemic (Spanish Flu) ==
The 1918 influenza pandemic, also termed the Spanish flu, constituted the most severe infectious viral outbreak in modern history, prior to the spread of COVID-19. Emerging in March 1918, in the final months of World War I, the Spanish flu proliferated as global efforts to contain the virus fell short to wartime antagonism. Despite its name, the virus was first recorded in Kansas, U.S., and rapidly spread amongst American soldiers located at Camp Funston. Close quarters of the barracks made for a perfect environment for the virus to spread, and soon the virus began appearing in other parts of the nation as soldiers were assigned across the nation. As America was mobilizing to enter fighting in World War I, infected soldiers were sent to France, facilitating the spread of the illness across Europe, with trenches making for perfect incubators for the virus. Despite guidelines set by the U.S. government for using face masks and quarantining, and exchange of information between Allied governments about the virus, censorship and suppression of information allowed for the virus to devastate Europe. In an era uniquely fraught with international hostility and belligerence, science diplomacy experienced limitations in its ability to facilitate information sharing and coordinate responses to the outbreak, yet it also enabled international collaborations among scientists and public health officials to mitigate the effects of the pandemic.

=== Pandemic Disinformation and Censorship ===
As the war continued to enable the spread of the influenza throughout Europe, European powers underplayed the severity of the outbreaks. Governments strove to preserve military morale and prevent mass panic, and they often encouraged the press to publicize false information, or outright prohibited publicity regarding the Spanish flu. During the first major wave of the flu, British newspapers and public officials dismissed the virus as a threat and deemed it unpatriotic to be concerned with the flu rather than the war. In Italy, Corriere della Sera, an Italian newspaper, was prohibited from publishing death tolls. During the second wave of the Spanish flu, Great Britain continued to suppress information about the spread of the disease. For example, the British press suppressed news that the prime minister had caught the disease.^{3} In addition to maintaining patriotism, countries did not want to appear weak or vulnerable to their enemies. General Erick Ludendorff, a German military general, failed to report that there had been a major outbreak within his troop. The same was true for the United States. Though the U.S. Army's medical department recognized the severity of the pandemic and encouraged public health precautions such as quarantines, other higher-up officials, including the president, prevented these measures from being taken. The pandemic was also leveraged to promote hateful rhetoric towards enemy nations. Rumors spread that the Germans were behind the flu. Governments across the world, including that of the United States, spread disinformation, censored data publication, and refused to implement precautionary measures until it was too late. This shortcoming in science diplomacy allowed the Spanish flu to claim more lives than it should have.

=== Interplay between the 1918 Pandemic and World War I ===
The complex interplay of the pandemic and the war makes it hard to claim one was more significant than the other. On one side, the spread of the virus resulted in more casualties and decreased morale amongst the soldiers, but on the other, the movement of troops and wartime censorship allowed for easier spread of the virus. To a large extent, the outcome of the pandemic and the war would not be the same if the other factor was missing.

The flu is believed to have first emerged in the United States, where military men trained and awaited their deployments. Once shipped off to Europe to join the fighting, many of the men unknowingly carried the influenza virus with them and facilitated its spread. While both the Allied and Axis powers were damaged by the spread of influenza, the American military more effectively treated and isolated its sick soldiers as compared to German military. The lack of medication and knowledge regarding the virus, along with the German troops' waning strength and comparatively inferior organization skills, all contributed to the forceful and damaging effects of the pandemic on the Axis powers. Scientists and historians agree that the 1918 influenza pandemic definitively weakened the German ranks and helped lead to their eventual defeat.

During the war, medical innovation and discovery was stalled due to the need for healthcare workers to serve as medics and nurses and to support the Army. Additionally, laws prohibited information exchange regarding the pandemic or war efforts. This meant that scientists between nations on opposing sides of the war could not communicate with one another and share details about the virus. This further delayed research regarding the flu, including its epidemiology and treatment methods, as no country had a complete understanding of the pandemic and science diplomacy was effectively hindered.

=== Public Health and Scientific Advancements ===
Etiological knowledge and scientific information regarding the Spanish flu was limited, and a shortage in pharmaceutical and preventive interventions, including immunizations, antiviral medications, or antibiotics for targeting secondary bacterial infections, impeded efforts to contain the virus. Many international and federal health agencies did not monitor the disease, and, in the United States, for instance, there was no requirement for medical officials to report cases of the flu. Consequently, the spread of the pandemic largely outpaced the development of effective international, national and local policies.

Nevertheless, previous scientific advances in germ theory and microbiology informed public health policy to some extent. Oceanic islands imposed quarantines, and Australia remained largely sheltered from the pandemic during its first wave in 1918. Face masks were enforced across nations including Japan and the United States, though not without public opposition. Across the U.S., social distancing measures were introduced. However, there was no international enactment of a coordinated pandemic response, and collaborative exchange of scientific and pandemic-related knowledge remained restricted. Thus, implementation of public health policy was inconsistent across the globe, and different nations suffered from the pandemic to varying degrees.

Despite wartime polarization, scientists and public health officials managed to mobilize science to assist with the pandemic response across geopolitical boundaries. The British Medical Research Council brought together international scientists to study the epidemiological and virological basis of the Spanish flu. In subsequent years, these cooperative efforts contributed to the development of experimental vaccinations for "influenzal pneumonia," a bacterial infection secondary to the Spanish flu. Global efforts to develop an influenza vaccine continued into the decades following the 1918 pandemic and were bolstered by alliances between North American and European research scientists. While science diplomacy was not yet formally established as a discipline, its principles were exemplified in the coordinated efforts between international scientists and public health policy officials to respond to the 1918 Influenza outbreak.

The tragic consequences of the Spanish flu pandemic imparted valuable lessons on the need to integrate science and policy for addressing issues in international affairs. The League of Nations, developed in 1920 for the promotion of world peace following World War I, was accompanied by the establishment of a specialized body that would encourage global cooperation to prevent the spread of infectious diseases, such as the Spanish flu, and respond to public health crises. Formally titled the Health Organization of the League of Nations, this agency mobilized scientists, researchers, public health officials, policy makers, and legislators, to coordinate international efforts that ultimately laid the foundation for the modern World Health Organization.

== Severe acute respiratory syndrome (SARS) ==
The 2003 severe acute respiratory syndrome (SARS) pandemic is often labeled the first pandemic of the 21st century. It initially appeared in China at the end of 2002 and quickly spread to more than two dozen countries in North America, South America, Europe, and Asia. The virus that causes SARS is known as SARS-associated Coronavirus (SARS-CoV) and is highly contagious, producing sometimes fatal respiratory illnesses. It can easily spread through close person-to-person contact. In 2003, the World Health Organization (WHO) reported a total of 8098 infections and 774 deaths. Only 8 tested positive for SARS-CoV in the United States at the time. The collaborative efforts by organizations, countries, researchers and public health officials all over the world led to containment of the virus within about 5–6 months. WHO first announced a global alert for a severe pneumonia-like disease on March 12. Measures taken by WHO ensured that consistent reports regarding countries most affected by the outbreak were received. WHO's collaboration with other organizations such as media outlets, UN agencies, and Global Outbreak Alert and Response Network (GOARN) allowed for identification of locations with new SARS cases. WHO also utilized the Global Public Health Intelligence Network (GPHIN), developed for WHO by Health Canada, to improve the speed of outbreak detection and advance the response time.

Immediate action was taken to implement proper containment measures when outbreak locations were identified. WHO also partnered with GOARN to dispatch teams of experts into areas heavily impacted by SARS such as China, Hong Kong, Singapore, and Vietnam. These experts represented around 20 different organizations and 15 different nationalities and worked in several sectors to contain the virus. Epidemiologists of varied backgrounds also worked together to review the measures to control the spread of the virus as well as analyze the behavior of the virus in transmission. Such epidemiologists hailed from the Health Protection Agency (United Kingdom), the National Institute of Infectious Diseases (Japan), the Robert Koch-Institut (Germany) and more. Clinicians representing over 11 countries also played integral roles in measures to fight the virus by working together to create effective treatment plans and improve infection control procedures in hospitals worldwide. Some of them were from Hõpital Universitaire de Genéve (Geneva, Switzerland), National Institute of Health (Slovenia), and Adelaide Meath and National Children's Hospital (Dublin, Ireland).

In addition, researchers from laboratories around the world shared their findings with each other in hopes of gaining better understanding of the disease to test possible vaccines for SARS. Along with these organizations, the Center for Disease Control and Prevention (CDC) has also closely worked with WHO throughout the course of the SARS outbreak. The CDC had promptly activated its Emergency Operations Center (EOC) just days after WHO's global alert and informed the public of this novel disease while providing precautionary protocols to avoid infection. They also established and dispatched teams of specialists of multiple backgrounds to conduct on-site investigations of SARS and carried out extensive research to test SARS specimen in order to identify its cause and transmission behavior. In July, WHO officially announced that the SARS epidemic had been contained.

However, even after intense efforts, no successful vaccine was created to combat SARS. In 2003, it took a considerable amount of time before the genome sequence of the virus was available and it wasn't until 2004 that possible vaccine trials were conducted in humans. Researchers in a 2005 journal proposed possible methods of vaccine development noting the possibility of an inactivated SARS-CoV based vaccine. They also proposed spike (S) protein, a glycoprotein component of SARS-CoV membrane, based vaccines as well as a recombinant RBD (a fragment in S protein) based vaccines. They concluded that of these methods, RBD vaccines may be the safest means of combating SARS, though no such effective vaccine currently exists. Nonetheless, collaborative efforts around SARS lead to major advancements in global public health. After SARS, the U.S. Department of Human and Health Services "amended the regulations to streamline the process of adding future emerging infectious diseases." Quarantine regulations of CDC were also revised to streamline the responsiveness to global health emergencies and "increase legal preparedness."

Collaboration between the U.S. and China also improved after SARS as Tommy Thompson, U.S. Secretary of Health and Human Services visited China in October 2003 and "signed a multiyear partnership with the Chinese Ministry of Health to develop a more robust public health infrastructure in China. Thompson also established an HHS health attaché at the U.S. embassy in Beijing." China's overall responsiveness and preparedness to infectious disease has also significantly improved since SARS as evident by their cooperative efforts in curbing the current SARS-CoV2 pandemic. Collaborative efforts were crucial to the containment of SARS. The importance of open collaboration was acknowledged formally in May 2003 when a resolution was adopted on SARS by delegates at the World Health Assembly; it called for the full support of all countries in combating SARS along with full transparency and steadfast reporting of requested information. A second resolution to improve International Health Regulations gave WHO the authority to take a much stronger role in case of infectious diseases that pose a threat to public health. This allowed WHO to act and respond to outbreaks using its own resources rather than waiting for official government notifications of outbreaks.

== Ebola ==
The Western African Ebola virus epidemic took more than 11,000 lives. Science diplomats traveled the world and worked with scientists from other countries in the hope of finding a vaccine to conquer the Ebola outbreak. The Ebola virus causes severe bleeding causing organ failure, lack of oxygen to the body, and it can lead to death. Scientists first discovered the Ebola virus in 1976 in Democratic Republic of Congo. Since then it has spread to other countries. It affected mostly West African countries. The largest outbreak of the Ebola virus from 2014 to 2016. There were over 28,000 cases. The virus had spread to Guinea, Liberia, Guinea, Ivory Coast, Gabon, Sierra Leone, Mali, Nigeria, Italy, the United States, and more. The virus spread to more than 17 countries. UNESCO played a huge role in preventing the spread of Ebola to neighboring cities and countries of West Africa. They funded $20,000 to a radio station in Sierra Leone to keep the people informed about the virus and the precautions that they could take in order to avoid it. Ebola did not spread to Koinadugu, Sierra Leone even though it borders the Republic of Guinea. which had 3814 cases and 2844 deaths

Moreover, the United Nations and International Non-Governmental Organizations have supported the public health response to bring an end to the Ebola epidemic in the Democratic Republic of Congo (DRC). They have made huge efforts to track the Ebola virus, to find out where it moves next in order to prevent transmission of the virus. The first Ebola outbreak was discovered in the DRC in a village near the Ebola River, which gave the virus its name. The 1976 Ebola outbreak was much more contained than the 2014–2016 outbreak. The 1976 Ebola outbreak lasted about 11 weeks. There were 318 cases and 280 deaths. The death rate was around 88 percent. In contrast, the Western African Ebola virus epidemic lasted more than two years, had nearly 29,000 cases and 11,310 deaths. The death rate of the Western African Ebola virus epidemic was around 50 percent.

During the Western African Ebola virus epidemic, science diplomats and other medical professionals traveled around the world to help track the outbreak. They tried to reduce the number of cases and deaths of the Ebola virus by studying the disease and testing possible vaccines or treatments to contain it. Even though it looked like they were not progressing, Scientists made huge efforts to minimize the Ebola virus. They tested many vaccines and treatments. Canadian scientists had been working on the Ebola vaccine research decades before the 2014–2016 outbreak. But, they were not making huge progress because they did not have enough funding. In 2010, Lead scientists left to do other research. But, one dedicated manager kept the research going. It wasn't until the 2014–2016 outbreak that they received more funding. In August 2014, Canada donated 3.6 million dollars to the WHO and MSF. Scientists received more than 120 million dollars from the Canadian government, the US government, and the WHO to support clinical trials during the epidemic. Canada developed the first vaccine approved by the world. Millions of dollars were spent to create the vaccine and it was developed by Merck. But it would not have happened without scientists from three different continents in multiple countries. The vaccine ERVEBO is used to protect against the Ebola virus. It was approved by the Food and Drug Administration in December 2019. Although there are no antiviral drugs approved by the FDA to treat people who currently have Ebola, there are alternative treatments such as: IV fluids, oxygen support, blood transfusions, and the vaccine ERVEBO, among others.

== Zika ==
Zika a flavivirus (a genus of viruses in the family of Flaviviridae) and a mosquito-borne disease first identified in monkeys in the Zika forest of Uganda in 1947. The virus primarily spreads in the wild to people through the bite of an infected Aedes aegypti mosquito. Additionally, the Aedes albopictus mosquito has been shown to transmit Zika under limited environmental conditions and in laboratory settings. In 1952, the first human illness caused by the Zika virus was reported in Nigeria. The first outbreak of Zika virus outside of Africa or Asia took place in 2007, within the state of Yap in Micronesia. In 2013, a large-scale Zika infection in French Polynesia and other countries and territories in the Pacific was recorded.

The WHO declared Zika a Public Health Emergency of International Concern following a series of global outbreaks and rising cases of neurological disorders in humans in 2015–2016. In March 2015, Zika virus was first discovered in the Americas when Brazil reported a large spike in fine, maculopapular rashes among people, soon identified as Zika virus infection. Between January and November 2015, several Brazilian states also reported an increase in cases of Guillain-Barré syndrome. Additionally, an increase in fetal microcephaly, as well as other neurological abnormalities in unborn babies, was reported in Brazil. The timing on the microcephaly, the history of rash in more than half of the pregnant mothers, and the ongoing circulation of Zika in urban environments suggested a link between the neurological disorder and the virus. Outside of Brazil, Zika virus was transmitted at an alarming rate and by March 2016 the virus had affected at least 33 countries and territories in America. A public health emergency was also announced in Puerto Rico by Secretary of Health and Human Services (HHS) Sylvia Burwell at the behest of Governor Alejandro Garcia Padilla, suggesting that the ongoing outbreak of Zika virus presented a serious threat to public safety. In the same year, the CDC recognized that Zika virus was not just a mosquito-borne disease; it could also be transmitted sexually between individuals. As such, the organization issued an official advisory to men who resided in or had traveled to areas with active Zika virus transmission and their sexual partners. In response to Zika outbreaks within the US, the Senate and the House of Representatives approved bills offering $1.1 billion in funding to combat Zika, which President Obama eventually signed.

The global humanitarian response against Zika has occurred on many fronts, with much effort devoted to developing anti-Zika virus vaccines and therapeutics. According to The WHO, 18 companies were working on the vaccines, as of March 2016. The WHO's priority was to develop a vaccine that was safe for use by pregnant women. With that in mind, the research institutions aimed to create inactivated vaccines, which were produced by treating infectious viruses with chemicals that destroy infectivity but maintain the capacity of the virus to induce a protective immune response. In 2016, The National Institute of Allergy and Infectious Diseases (NIAID), part of the National Institutes of Health (NIH), conducted a human clinical trial of the NIAID Zika virus investigational DNA vaccine. In 2017, the phase 2/2b clinical trials were conducted, with the target of obtaining more safety and immune response against the diseases caused by Zika virus. Despite these effort, to date there still is no effective vaccine available for Zika virus.

Additional support in the fight against Zika was seen from major international health organizations. The WHO issued guidelines outlined in the Zika Strategic Response Framework to effectively interfere and help families, communities and countries to control Zika virus disease. The four main goals of their response plan - detection, prevention, care, and support and research - have supported national governments and communities to prevent and manage the complications of Zika virus. The WHO and other international health organizations carried out further research development activities focused on diagnostic tests and innovative methods to control mosquitoes. The CDC also provided an action plan to prevent the spread of the Zika virus, as well as surveillance instructions for taking precautions before and during the mosquito season. This plan detailed the development and distribution of MAC-ELISA testing kits to the US and the development of Trioplex rRT-PCR to detect Zika, dengue, and chikungunya viral RNA.

== COVID-19 ==
On December 31, 2019, authorities in Wuhan, China reported the first cases of an unknown pneumonia to the World Health Organization (WHO). Shortly after that, on January 4, 2020, the WHO reported on social media that there had been a group of pneumonia cases in Wuhan, China but that no deaths had been reported. The unknown pneumonia was a novel coronavirus, which they later named COVID-19. WHO quickly realized that it was a serious problem and issues between science and diplomacy on the topic of COVID-19 became evident. The Chinese government did not alert the WHO about the full extent of the seriousness of the outbreak.

By the time the WHO realized that the problem was serious, the false information of a low mortality rate and its low risk to non-senior citizens had already spread very rapidly. The United States and the WHO tried to send scientists to help China fight COVID-19; however, China refused the help. China did eventually share the genome sequence of COVID-19 with the global community and later accepted another offer from the WHO to send a team of scientists to help. The lack of communication and the slow transmission of information between science and government caused failures to slow the spread of the virus in its early stages. To further complicate this stage, when scientists did give information or guidance, governments did not take it into proper consideration. As a result, by not acting fast enough, many people were infected and local economies suffered due to the slow decision to act in unison. The overall impact on society would have been less detrimental if governments had acted in collaboration with each other and scientists.

Some progress has been made among the scientific community itself in creating transparency, so local scientists in each region have access to the information they need to fight COVID-19. For example, the global scientific community began making efforts to communicate and share relevant information to help combat COVID-19 without delay. The WHO reported that a global research roadmap has been created in March 2020 to fight COVID-19. Scientists are publishing research findings before they are peer-reviewed and sharing other discoveries without delay. Scientists and clinicians are working to fight the epidemic by sharing data through information sharing technologies using bioRxiv, medRxiv, ChemRxiv, and arXiv, which allows them to share information in real time. These tools are helping biopharma research and development, academic labs, government regulators, and the clinical community to speed up the process of testing new pathways to treating COVID-19 patients more efficiently. As one researcher explains, "We are experiencing a shift towards Open Science at a speed that was previously unthinkable. It began with the publication of the genetic sequence of COVID-19 by Chinese scientists in early January 2020 via GenBank – an open-access DNA database operated by the US National Center for Biotechnology Information"

Additionally, The World Economic Forum has partnered with the WHO to mobilize and help supply the needed resources required to fight COVID-19 itself and the economic impact it is having. With the sharing of this information around the world by scientific communities, each individual country is better equipped with the knowledge they need to combat the pandemic and investigate possible treatments, testing, and vaccines. In the most current WHO published table of COVID-19 vaccines, there are 124 candidates that are in different stages of vaccine development.

== COVID-19 vaccine development and collaborations ==
=== Timeline Around The World ===
As COVID-19 quickly became a worldwide threat, many countries were in a rush to develop a vaccine in an attempt to control the situation. "To denote the ever-growing relevance of activities in this area, the term "vaccine diplomacy" has been widely used", which "means a set of diplomatic measures taken to ensure access to the best practices in the development of potential vaccines, to enhance bilateral and/or multilateral cooperation between countries in conducting joint R&D, and, in the case of the announcement of production, to ensure the signing of a contract for the purchase of the vaccine at the shortest term." Many companies seized the chance to participate in the race to create the first working vaccine and to do so, they quickly secured funding deals with either private or public funding. Each company took their own approach in developing the vaccine resulting in a variety of COVID-19 vaccines worldwide such as: DNA vaccine, viral vector vaccine, protein subunit vaccine, RNA vaccine, inactivated vaccine, and whole virus vaccine. Many companies in the same countries either ended up choosing different vaccine types or tried to develop the same vaccine through partnerships. One notable partnership is the Pfizer-BioNTech vaccine. It was initiated through a deal between Pfizer, an American company, and BioNTech, a German company in March 2020 and eventually approved by FDA for emergency use on December 11, 2020. This was actually a continued partnership between Pfizer and BioNTech because they were previously partners in developing the flu vaccine. Another example is the Oxford-AstraZeneca vaccine that was developed between the University of Oxford and AstraZeneca, a British-Swedish company.

While the United States slowly begins to administer vaccines, other places in the world are eager to receive their doses. In January 2021, the United Kingdom finally began to distribute Oxford Astra-Zeneca Around the same time, Moderna ramped up their vaccine production to help supply the U.S. government and clinical trials for the only 3 FDA-approved vaccines began. With several variants emerging throughout the world, the safety and effectiveness of the vaccine comes into question. By the end of the month, Johnson & Johnson and Novavax continue their trials to get approval and South Africa suspends the Oxford Astra-Zeneca dose due to the different variants. By the end of February 2021, Israel marked history by being the first country to have half of their population fully vaccinated with Pfizer-BioNTech. And in March 2021, Johnson & Johnson began to send out their vaccines. Unfortunately, the CDC (Centers for Disease Control and Prevention) and FDA had put a pause on Janssen vaccine as 6 cases of cerebral venous sinus thrombosis (blood clot) have been reported. Shortly after, the European Commission (E.C) also put a halt on both J&J and Astra-Zeneca due to similar complications. As more research is done on the development of vaccines, nations across the world continue to find new data to immunize societies effectively, yet safely.

=== Clinical Trials ===
The Oxford-AstraZeneca vaccine is a non-profit vaccine developed for the purpose of distribution toward lower and middle-income countries. The phase one results of the clinical trial supported a two-dose vaccination to be distributed 28 days apart. The trials involved participants either receiving the ChAdOx1 nCoV-19 vaccine or a control substance like saline. The efficiency results gathered by comparing the hospital admissions that occurred within 4 months of the trial for control and vaccine groups. The test's accuracy is supported by the size of the sample group, diversity of ethnic communities and gender represented, and similarity of results between countries. The trials are constantly paused and investigated to validate the safety of the vaccines.

==== Operation Warp Speed ====
The rapid development of the Coronavirus vaccine was achieved with the contribution of organizations like Operation Warp Speed (OWS) which formed contracts to fund vaccine companies in the development and distribution of vaccines. Six companies were selected by OWS based on if they matched the criteria of being a safe and effective vaccine that could be mass-produced. Due to the necessity of a Coronavirus 19 vaccine, the FDA approved unlicensed vaccines that adhere to the EUA standard to be utilized and OWS accelerated the development by allowing trials that would occur concurrently to be done simultaneously with mRNA and Replication-defective live-vector platforms for vaccine having the potential to be readily mass-produced. Large scale manufacturing of the vaccine occurred at the same time as the clinical trial.

==== Equitable Distribution Concerns ====
Science diplomacy is necessary to establish infrastructure for distributing COVAX's vaccine to poorer countries that lack the framework to utilize the doses. The failure of the 2009 H1N1 Virus Vaccine Deployment Initiative (VDI) to allocate vaccines to countries that had difficulties with developing a deployment plan resulted in the poorest countries receiving the least aid during the pandemic.

==== Vaccine Nationalism ====
United Nations Resolution 74/274 allowed for the World Health Organization (WHO) to coordinate efforts for developing a COVID-19 vaccine and developed the resource sharing platform ACT-Accelerator. A total of 2.4 billion dollars were invested into research and development for the viruses which resulted in new vaccine platforms being explored by pharmaceutical companies and served as an initial investment for the clinical testing of potential vaccines which boost confidence for investors as they could invest in the effective vaccine. Vaccine Nationalism poses an obstacle to COVAX Facility's aim to equitably distribute the vaccine across the world funded by higher-income countries over concerns such as increasing cost and delaying distribution of the vaccine. COVAX receives funding of $960 million from these countries in the form of donations and these countries form competing contracts with pharmaceutical companies.

==== Communication and Open Source Networks ====
Communication technologies have a prominent role in communication during Coronavirus 19 as laboratories and in-person research conferences were closed due to physical distancing measures. The use of Zoom, Hangouts, and Skype provide researchers the advantage of eliminating barriers to Science diplomacy by removing travel costs and allow for more direct communication of data. COVID-net is an open source network that collects information about COVID-19 by comparing Chest X-ray(CXR) from hospitalization data to gather information on what factors are associated with the virus. NextStrain is an open-source tool that tracks the epidemiology of several viruses including COVID-19, illustrates the strands of COVID-19 are present in world regions, and the frequency of individuals infected with specific strands based on data collected. COVID-19 CoV Genetics tool (COVID-19 CG) is an open-source epidemiology source that gathered data from over 400,000 genomes which illustrates that several nonsynonymous mutations have occurred in the virus as of February 2021 compared to the virus sample gathered during the initial Wuhan outbreak(WIV04). Tracking the nonsynonymous mutations in COVID-19 is important for reopening countries as new strains of the virus could be resilient to the efficiency of existing treatment and vaccines. Labs are able to utilize COVID-19 CG to evaluate primers in the virus and the impact of mutations on primers being developed to combat the virus.

== COVID-19 vaccine rollout ==
The United States Food and Drug Administration (FDA) approved the emergency use of the first dosages of the mRNA vaccines in December 2020. This includes usage of the mRNA vaccines such as Pfizer-BioNTech and Moderna. The New York Times also reports that the Pfizer vaccine is being administered in North America, parts of South America, Europe, and Australia, while the Moderna vaccine is focused on North Americans. Other vaccines such as England's Oxford Uni-AstraZeneca are being used in a little over 120 countries. Unlike the mRNA vaccines, Oxford Uni-AstraZeneca and Russia's Sputnik V are both viral vector vaccines. Statistics show that as of April 2021, an estimate of 11 doses for every 100 people has been given out worldwide, coming close to a total of 900 million vaccines being administered.

To tackle the virus and get the majority of the population vaccinated, most nations have come up with a scheme. This mainly gives priority to those working in the healthcare field, coming down to those over the age of 65, as well as people with underlying health conditions, moving down the list to the general public usually by age groups. Israel has been the first in proving that the vaccines are effective in reducing the number of cases and deaths. However, different parts of the world are at different rates when it comes to the rollout of vaccines. Despite over 1 billion doses (data from May 2021) being administered around the world; the United States, China, India, and the UK seem to be in the lead with getting their people immune. With the need for approval, the companies that are available on the market remain limited. It's been reported that Oxford's Astra-Zeneca has been the most globally widely used vaccine followed by Pfizer-BioNTech.

It is evident that there is inequality amongst the distribution of vaccines. Many countries that have developed their own vaccines are also administering vaccines made by other nations. This is due to the fact that demand is greater than supply. With little time, countries are not able to mass-produce enough vaccines for everyone. Ordering vaccines from other countries can help push the efforts to get everyone vaccinated as soon as possible.

=== COVID-19 Vaccines Global Access (COVAX) ===
Along with the fast rollout of the vaccines comes dilemmas in resources to provide immunity to low-middle-income and third-world nations. Countries mainly in Africa are seen to have the lowest rates of vaccinations due to their lack of resources, technology, and international assistance. In an effort to control the pandemic, not only is the development of the vaccine important, but the worldwide rollout of vaccines is too. There are many third-world countries that can't afford to develop a vaccine and therefore become reliant on more powerful nations. As of July 31, 2020, through Gavi's COVAX Advance Market Commitment, a list of 92 low- and middle-income countries will be able to access COVID-19 vaccines.

With help from the World Health Organization (W.H.O), Coalition for Epidemic Preparedness Innovations (Cepi), and the United Nations UNICEF', the Global Vaccine Alliance (Gavi) was able to collaborate and cover for the expenses of vaccines needed in third world countries. Covax's mission is to help end the acute phase of the pandemic but also help rebuild economies. They implemented a goal to provide 2 billion doses to countries in need, yet these 2 billion doses only add up to 20% of the demand. This was also made possible by donations from high-income countries that also participated in the development of the vaccines.

As of May 2021, it's been reported that over 49 million doses of the vaccine have been delivered via Covax. The World Health Organization's director Tedros Adhanom Ghebreyesus stated that more funds are needed to ensure that poor nations become immunized. An estimate of $35-$45 billion is still needed for the rollout of vaccines over the course of next year. With several emerging crises around the world, vaccine distribution has become a problem. India's health crisis had led to Covax sending most of their supply over to India to help control the outbreak. Covax continues to partner with countries and pharmaceutical companies who are willing to donate to low-to-middle-income nations. The U.S. company Moderna has agreed to a deal with Covax in preparing 500 million doses for rollout in 2022. While countries like Sweden have offered one million Oxford-AstraZeneca doses starting May 2021 in the efforts to put an end to this pandemic.

=== COVID-19 Vaccine Complications & Countermeasures ===
In an effort to put a stop to the pandemic, many countries were rushing to develop working vaccines. As many companies started to produce their own vaccines, many clinical trials were held to test out each vaccine's efficacy. Once each vaccine's collected data meets certain safety standards, organizations such as the United States Centers for Disease Control and Prevention (CDC), the United States Food and Drug Administration (FDA), or the European Medicines Agency (EMA) officially approve it for emergency use. From the beginning of the pandemic, until the first COVID-19 vaccines were approved for emergency use in the public, it was only less than a year's time. The average time taken to produce any other existing vaccine averages to more than a decade's time due to all the intense research and repeated trials in order to create a safe and working vaccine. However, since COVID-19 vaccines are approved for emergency use, their clinical trials were rushed and didn't have sufficient data. Therefore, the release of COVID-19 vaccines were accompanied with unknown side effects. More data on the results of COVID-19 vaccines can only be observed as it was being administered. It was warned that people with severe allergies to components used in the vaccines should not be vaccinated to avoid anaphylaxis, which was a shown reaction during clinical trials. In addition, people with pre-existing health conditions and women who are pregnant, or breastfeeding should first consult with their healthcare provider before receiving the vaccine to avoid any complications.

As many vaccines were being mass-produced, besides being administered in their own country, they were also being sold to other countries who were in need of vaccines. However, soon after some of these vaccines were being administered, there were following side effects that possibly posed a threat to all those receiving it. One example would be the Oxford-AstraZeneca vaccine that was approved for emergency use by the European Medicines Agency on January 12, 2021. After some patients received the vaccine, they developed unusual blood clots along with low blood platelet levels (thrombocytopenia). There were recorded cases of blood clots in veins in the brain (cerebral venous sinus thrombosis), in the abdomen (splanchnic vein thrombosis), and in other arteries as well. As soon as these cases emerged, many countries such as Germany, France, Italy, Spain, etc. had immediately paused the use of the Oxford-AstraZeneca vaccine and put the vaccine under investigation. As of March 31, 2021 in just the United Kingdom, there were 79 recorded cases of blood clots in which 19 of them were fatal. After investigation, the EMA had decided that the benefits of the vaccine outweighed the risks and approved the continuation of the vaccine but advised caution to those who were receiving it. This was decided based on the statistics showing that there were only 19 fatal cases out of more than 25 million people who had already received it worldwide. Many countries in Europe have also resumed administering the vaccine but put restrictions on it. This includes Germany who limited it to people over age 60 and France who limited it to people over age 55. This was because most cases of blood clots occurred in women who were under the age of 55.

Similarly, the American Janssen vaccine that was approved on February 27, 2021, for use was also paused by the CDC due to a blood-clotting issue. By April 13, 2021, there were reports that within two weeks of receiving the vaccine, six women developed rare blood clots in the brain (cerebral venous sinus thrombosis) accompanied with low blood platelets levels (thrombocytopenia) in which one case was fatal. By that time, there were more than 6.8 million people who had already received the vaccine. During the pause, the Advisory Committee on Immunization Practices convened and eventually decided to recommend resumption of the vaccine but only for people above age 18. On April 23, 2021, FDA and CDC had lifted the pause on the Johnson & Johnson's vaccine but advised caution to those above age 18 who were receiving the vaccine. Both the Oxford-AstraZeneca and Johnson & Johnson's vaccines were resumed for use because officials have decided that the benefits outweighed the risks and that there were extremely rare chances of developing blood clots from the vaccines, which was also why none of these cases appeared during clinical trials.

=== India's Second Wave ===
India has been hard hit with another wave reporting up to 400,000 cases and approximately 3,000 deaths each day. Serum Institute of India (SII) and Bharat Biotech are some of the main Indian companies for vaccine production. Despite being one of the biggest vaccine manufacturers, they seem to be facing shortages due to high demands. This caused India to put a halt in overseas shipments. They have recently exported over 64 million doses to 86 countries ranging from parts of Asia, South and North America to Africa. India has been administering their own vaccine known as Covaxin by Bharat Biotech, as well as their local Covishield (known as Oxford-AstraZeneca). These are also the two main vaccines being administered in other countries through private contracts, and with COVAX.

Assistance from other nations have also been provided to slow down the spread and death rate in India. Russia's Sputnik V vaccine has also recently been approved for use to aid with the dramatic increase of COVID-19 cases. The United States has agreed to fund these biotech companies with supplies for accelerated production. Approval of other global vaccines are in the process to get India immune as quickly as possible. While India faces shortages of oxygen supply, hospital beds and vaccines; places like the U.S. and Australia are restricting any travelers from India into their countries to help stop the spread.

It is evident that vaccine diplomacy has been at its peak during the current pandemic. This pandemic continues to have detrimental impacts on societies, environments, and the economy but it has also shown us that with science diplomacy and the sharing of knowledge, the fight against the novel coronavirus is possible.

== See also ==
- 2002-2004 SARS outbreak
- 2015-2016 Zika virus epidemic
- COVID-19 pandemic
- COVID-19 vaccine
- Ebola vaccine
- List of Ebola outbreaks
- SARS
- World Health Organization's response to the COVID-19 pandemic
- Zika virus vaccine
- Zika virus outbreak timeline
