= Vaccine Maitri =

Vaccination initiative by the Indian government

Countries that received doses of the Indian-made Covaxin as of 6 March 2021

Vaccine Maitri ("Vaccine Friendship") is a humanitarian initiative undertaken by the Indian government to provide COVID-19 vaccines to countries around the world. The government started providing vaccines from 20 January 2021. As of 21 February 2022, India had delivered around 16.29 crore (162.9 million) doses of vaccines to 96 countries. Of these, 1.43 crore (14.3 million) doses were gifted to 98 countries by the Government of India. The remaining 10.71 crore were supplied by the vaccine producers under its commercial and 4.15 crore were supplied by COVAX obligations. In late March 2021, the Government of India temporarily froze exports of the Covishield, citing India's own COVID crisis and the domestic need for these vaccines. The Health Minister of India, Mansukh Mandaviya announced in September that India will resume the export of vaccines from October to the rest of the world.

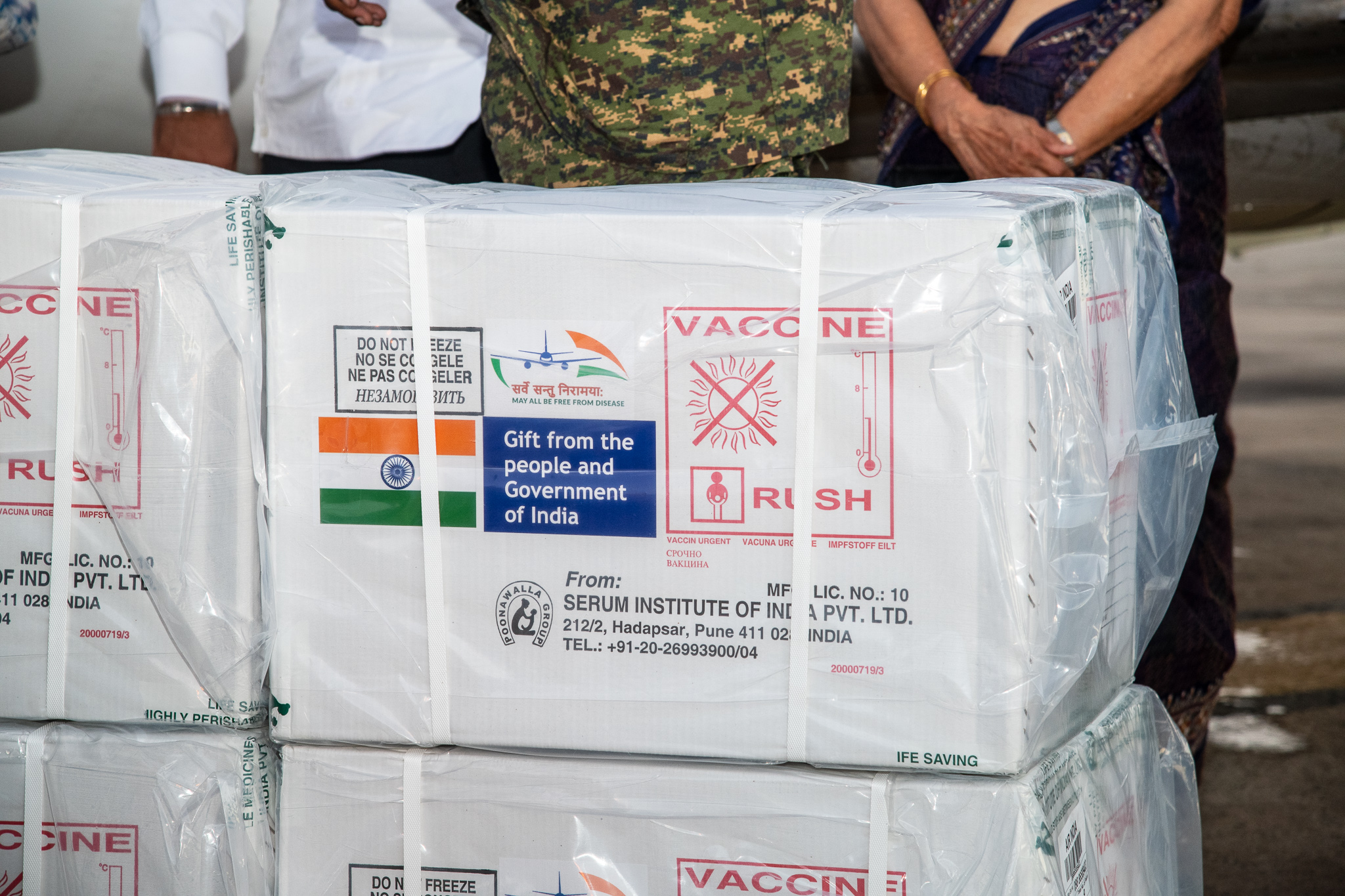

200,000 doses of COVID-19 vaccines were gifted by India to the UN peacekeepers on 27 March to be distributed to all peacekeeping missions.

== Vaccines ==
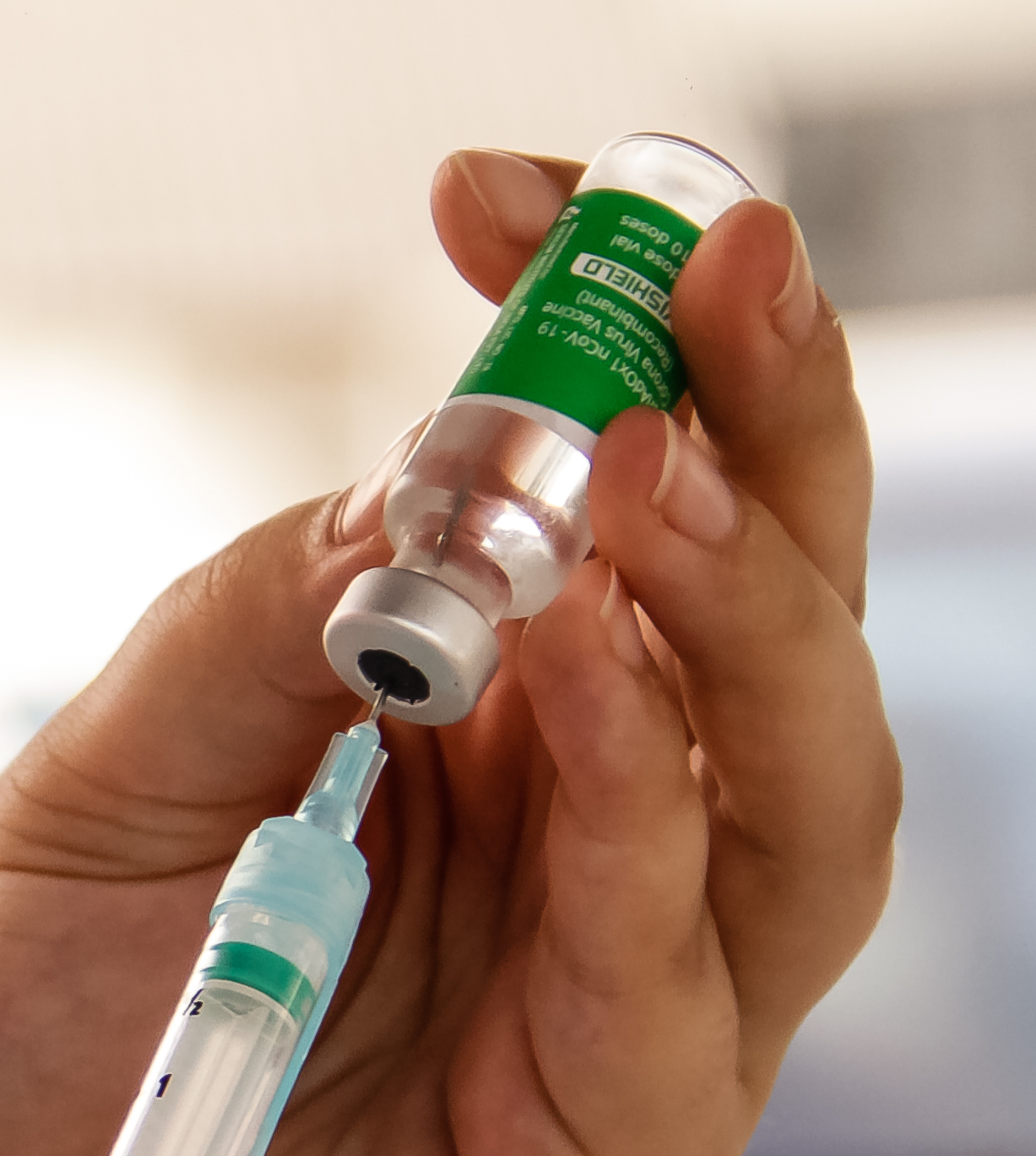
A vial of Covishield, the Indian-manufactured version of the AstraZeneca vaccine.

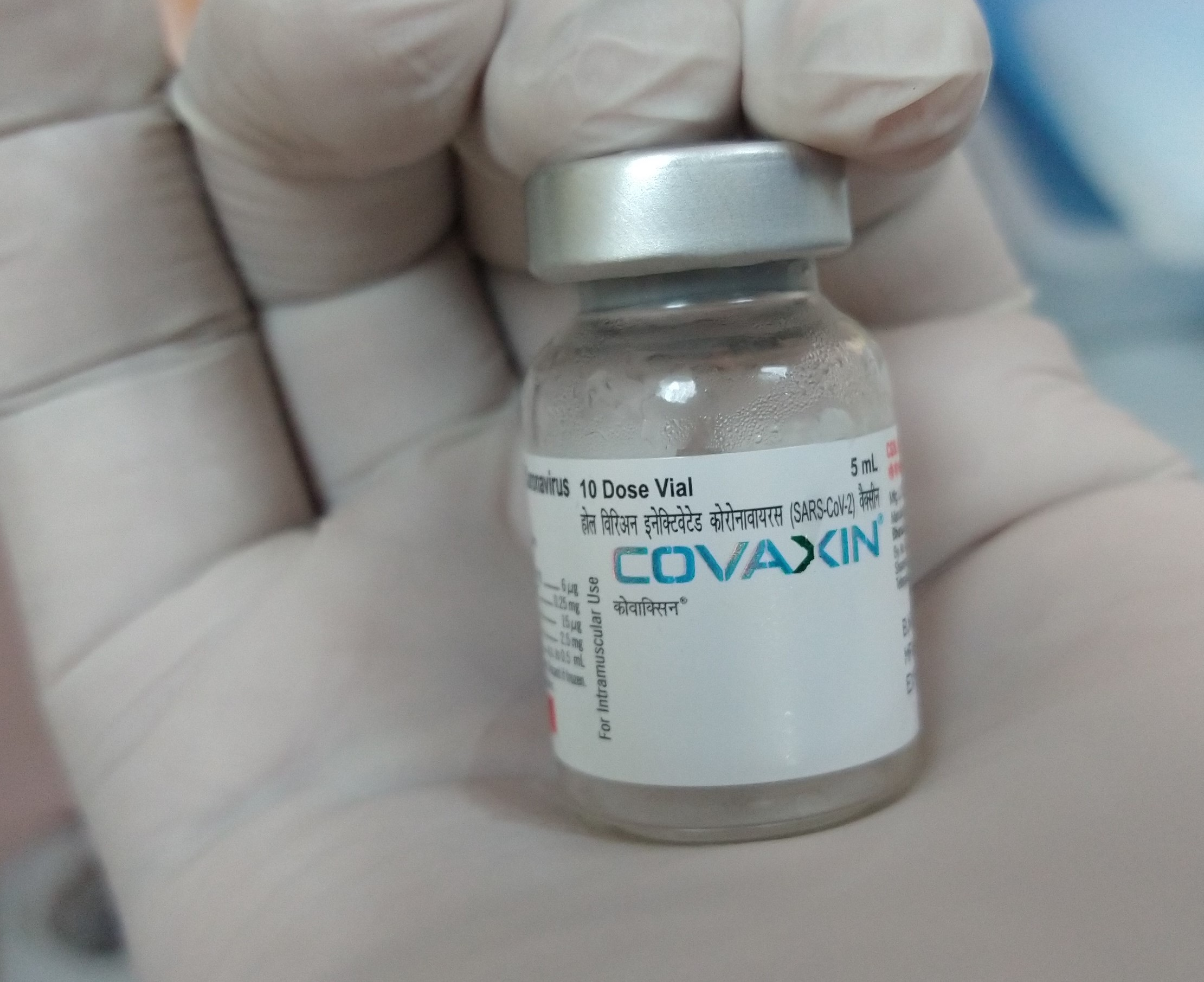
A vial of Covaxin

India has two approved COVID-19 vaccines: Covishield and Covaxin. Both of them were exported and used in foreign grants by the Government of India.

=== Covishield ===
On 1 January 2021, the Drug Controller General of India, approved the emergency or conditional use of Covishield. Covishield is developed by the University of Oxford and its spin-out company, Vaccitech.

=== Covaxin ===
On 2 January 2021, Covaxin India's first COVID-19 vaccine, developed by Bharat Biotech in association with the Indian Council of Medical Research and National Institute of Virology received approval from the Drug Controller General of India for its emergency or conditional use.

== Vaccine supply ==
India kicked off international shipment of the vaccines on 20 January 2021, only four days after starting its own vaccination program. Bhutan and Maldives were the first countries to receive vaccines as a grant by India. This was quickly followed by shipments to Nepal, Bangladesh, Myanmar and Seychelles. By mid-March 2021, India was also supplying vaccines on a commercial basis to countries including Canada, the UK, and Saudi Arabia.

The Serum Institute of India was selected as a key supplier of cost-effective COVID-19 vaccines to the COVAX initiative, 19.8 million doses of Covishield vaccines were supplied by India to various countries through the initiative.

In May, when COVAX was already short 140 million doses, the Serum Institute announced that it expected to maintain its suspension of vaccine deliveries to COVAX through the end of 2021 due to the second wave of COVID-19 in India and the US ban on export of key raw materials.

As of 21 February 2022, India had exported total 16,29,63,500 doses including 1,42,67,000 vaccine provided as grant, 10,71,48,000 as commercial, and 4,15,48,500 through COVAX to 96 nations.

| Country | Total (Note: Quantity in Lakhs) | Grant | | Commercial | | COVAX | |
| Country | Total | Doses | Date | Doses | Date | Doses | Date |
|---|---|---|---|---|---|---|---|
| Bangladesh | 225.928 | 33.000 | (20) 21-Jan-21; (12) 26 March 21; (1) 2 April 2021 | 150.008 | (50) 25-Jan-21; (20) 22-Feb-21; (10) 9 October 2021; 45.006 (01 Dec 2021); (25.002) 07 Dec 2021 | 42.920 | (2.12) 04 Dec 2021; (32.88 ) 06 Dec 2021; (7.92) 14 Dec 2021 |
| Myanmar | 212.000 | 37.000 | (15 SII)22-Jan-21; (2 BB) 11-Feb-21; (10 SII) 9 Oct 21, (5 BB) 22 Dec 2021; (5BB) 28 dec 2021 | 175.000 | (20)11-Feb-21; 1 BB (18 December 2021); 67 (27 Dec 2021); 67 (28 Dec 2021); (20 BB) 22 Jan 2022 | | |
| Nepal | 94.990 | 11.120 | (10) 21-Jan-21; (1) 28 March 21; (0.12) 7 October 21 | 20.000 | (10) 20-Feb-21; (10) 9 Oct 21 | 63.870 | (3.48)05/03/2021; (7.255) 28 Nov 2021; (9.72) 30 Nov 2021; (6) 07 Dec 2021; 18.71 (14 Dec 2021); (18.705) 18 Dec 2021 |
| Bhutan | 5.500 | 5.500 | (1.5) 20-Jan-21; (4) 21 March 21 | | | | |
| Maldives | 3.120 | 2.000 | (1) 20-Jan-21; (1) 19 Feb-21 | 1.000 | 29 March 21 | 0.120 | 6 March 21 |
| Mauritius | 4.000 | 1.000 | 22-Jan-21 | 3.000 | (1 SII) 19-Feb-21; (2 BB) 18 March 21 | | |
| Seychelles | 0.500 | 0.500 | 22-Jan-21 | | | | |
| Sri Lanka | 12.640 | 5.000 | 28-Jan-21 | 5.000 | 24-Feb-21 | 2.640 | 6 March 21 |
| Bahrain | 1.000 | 1.000 | 28-Jan-21 | | | | |
| Brazil | 40.000 | | | 40.000 | (20) 22-Jan-21; (20) 22 Feb-21 | | |
| Morocco | 70.000 | | | 70.000 | (20) 22-Jan-21; (40)11 Feb-21; (10) 24 Feb-21 | | |
| Oman | 1.000 | 1.000 | 30 -Jan -21 | | | | |
| Egypt | 0.500 | | | 500 | 30-Jan-21 | | |
| Algeria | 0.500 | | | 0.500 | 31-Jan-21 | | |
| South Africa | 10.000 | | | 10.000 | 31-Jan-21 | | |
| Kuwait | 2.000 | | | 2.000 | 31-Jan-21 | | |
| UAE | 2.000 | | | 2.000 | 02-Feb-21 | | |
| Afghanistan | 14.680 | 10.000 | (5) 7 Feb2021; (5 BB) 31 Dec 2021 | | | 4.680 | 6 March 21 |
| Barbados | 1.000 | 1.000 | 7 Feb 2021 | | | | |
| Dominica | 0.700 | 0.700 | 7 Feb 2021 | | | | |
| Mexico | 20.300 | | | 20.300 | (8.7) 12 Feb-21; (11.6) 05 Feb 2022 | | |
| Dominican Republic | 1.400 | 0.300 | 18 Feb 2021 | 1.100 | (0.2)14 Feb-21; (0.9) 16 Jan 2022 | | |
| Saudi Arabia | 45.000 | | | 45.000 | (30)14 Feb-21; (15) 28 March 21 | | |
| El Salvador | 1.100 | | | 1.000 | (0.2)15 Feb-21; (0.9) 09 Jan 2022 | | |
| Argentina | 5.800 | | | 5.800 | 16 Feb-21 | | |
| Serbia | 1.500 | | | 1.500 | 20 Feb-21 | | |
| UN Health workers | 1.250 | | | 1.250 | (1) 21 Feb-21; (0.25) 04 Dec 2021 | | |
| Mongolia | 1.500 | | | 1.500 | 21 Feb-21 | | |
| Ukraine | 5.000 | | | 5.00 | 22 Feb-21 | | |
| Ghana | 27.040 | 0.500 | 4 Mar 2021 | 0.020 | 10 March 21 | 26.520 | (6)23 Feb-21; (10.62) 12 Dec 2021; (9.9) 03 Feb 2022 |
| Ivory Coast | 5.540 | 0.500 | 4 Mar 2021 | | | 5.040 | 25 Feb-21 |
| St. Lucia | 0.250 | 0.250 | 27 Feb 2021 | | | | |
| St. Kitts & Nevis | 0.200 | 0.200 | 27 Feb 2021 | | | | |
| St. Vincent & Grenadines | 0.400 | 0.400 | 27 Feb 2021 | | | | |
| Suriname | 0.500 | 0.500 | 27 Feb 2021 | | | | |
| Antigua & Barbuda | 0.400 | 0.400 | 27 Feb 2021 | | | | |
| DR Congo | 17.660 | 0.500 | 4 Mar 2021 | | | 17.160 | 1 Mar-21 |
| Angola | 6.240 | | | | | 6.240 | 1 Mar-21 |
| Gambia | 0.360 | | | | | 0.360 | 1 Mar-21 |
| Nigeria | 97.660 | 1.000 | 25 Mar 2021 | | | 96.660 | (39.24) 1 Mar-21; (13.98) 08 Jan 2022; (13.98) 11 Jan 2022; (14.73) 15 Jan 2022; (14.73) 18 Jan 2022 |
| Cambodia | 3.340 | | | 0.100 | (0.1 BB) 04 Dec 2021 | 3.240 | 2 Mar-21 |
| Kenya | 11.200 | 1.000 | 10 Mar 2021 | | | 10.200 | 2 Mar-21 |
| Lesotho | 0.360 | | | | | 0.360 | 2 Mar-21 |
| Rwanda | 7.900 | 0.500 | 4 Mar 2021 | 5.000 | (5) 05 Dec 2021 | 2.400 | 2 Mar-21 |
| São Tomé and Príncipe | 0.240 | | | | | 0.240 | 2 Mar-21 |
| Senegal | 3.490 | 0.250 | 4 Mar 2021 | | | 3.240 | 2 Mar-21 |
| Guatemala | 2.000 | 2.000 | 2 Mar 2021 | | | | |
| Canada | 5.000 | | | 5.000 | 2 Mar-21 | | |
| Mali | 3.960 | | | | | 3.960 | 3 Mar-21 |
| Sudan | 18.360 | | | | | 18.360 | (8.28)3 Mar-21; (10.08) 12 Feb 2022 |
| Liberia | 0.960 | | | | | 0.960 | 4 Mar-21 |
| Malawi | 4.100 | 0.500 | 12 Mar 2021 | | | 3.600 | 4 Mar-21 |
| Uganda | 9.640 | 1.000 | 7 Mar 2021 | | | 8.640 | 4 Mar-21 |
| Nicaragua | 3.350 | 2.000 | 5 Mar 2021 | | | 1.350 | 14 Mar-21 |
| Guyana | 0.800 | 0.800 | 5 Mar 2021 | | | | |
| Jamaica | 0.500 | 0.500 | 5 Mar 2021 | | | | |
| UK | 50.000 | | | 50.000 | 5 March-21 | | |
| Togo | 1.560 | | | | | 1.560 | 5 Mar-21 |
| Djibouti | 0.240 | | | | | 0.240 | 5 Mar-21 |
| Somalia | 8.400 | | | | | 8.400 | (3)5 Mar-21; (5.4) 19 Dec 2021 |
| Sierra Leone | 0.960 | | | | | 0.960 | 6 Mar-21 |
| Belize | 0.250 | | | | | 0.250 | 7 Mar 2021 |
| Botswana | 1.300 | 0.300 | 7 Mar 2021 | 1.000 | 1 (BB) 20 Dec 2021 | | |
| Mozambique | 12.040 | 1.000 | 7 Mar 2021 | | | 11.040 | (3.84) 7 Mar-21; (7.2) 07 Dec 2021 |
| Ethiopia | 21.840 | | | | | 21.840 | 7 Mar-21 |
| Tajikistan | 8.905 | | | | | 8.905 | (1.92)8 Mar-21; (6.985)27 Nov 2021 |
| Benin | 1.440 | | | | | 1.440 | 8 Mar-21 |
| Eswatini | 0.320 | 0.200 | 9 Mar 2021 | | | 0.120 | 11 Mar-21 |
| Bahamas | 0.200 | 0.200 | 10 Mar 2021 | | | | |
| Cape Verde | 0.240 | | | | | 0.240 | 9 Mar-21 |
| Iran | 11.250 | 10.000 | 10 (BB) 8 Oct 21 | 1.250 | (1.25 BB) 10 March 2021 | | |
| Uzbekistan | 7.959 | | | | | 6.600 | 15 Mar-21 |
| Solomon Islands | 0.240 | | | 1.358750 | (SL 1.35875 ) 18 Feb 2022 | 0.240 | 17 Mar-21 |
| Laos | 7.260 | | | | | 7.260 | (1.32) 17 Mar-21; (5.94) 16 Feb 2022 |
| Namibia | 0.300 | 0.300 | 18 Mar 2021 | | | | |
| Bolivia | 2.280 | | | | | 2.280 | 18 Mar-21 |
| South Sudan | 1.320 | | | | | 1.320 | 22 Mar-21 |
| Paraguay | 6.000 | 2.000 | (1 BB) 26 Mar 2021; (1BB) 22 April 2021 | 4.000 | (4 BB) 07 Nov 2021 | | |
| Fiji | 1.000 | 1.000 | 26 March 2021 | | | | |
| UN Peacekeepers | 2.000 | 2.000 | | 27 March 2021 | | | |
| Zimbabwe | 0.750 | 0.750 | (0.35 BB ) 28 March 2021; (0.4 BB) 14 Dec 2021 | | | | |
| Niger | 3.802 | 0.250 | 28 March 2021 | | | 3.552 | 12 Apr-21 |
| Palestine | 0.250 | | | 0.250 | 29 March-21 | | |
| Yemen | 3.600 | | | | | 3.600 | 29 Mar-21 |
| Nauru | 0.100 | 0.100 | 6 April 2021 | | | | |
| Trinidad & Tobago | 0.400 | 0.400 | | 9 April 2021 | | | |
| Guinea | 1.944 | | | | | 1.944 | 10 Apr-21 |
| Papua New Guinea | 1.320 | | | | | 1.320 | 10 Apr-21 |
| Guinea Bissau | 0.288 | | | | | 0.288 | 10 Apr-21 |
| Zambia | 2.280 | | | | | 2.280 | 11 Apr-21 |
| Comoros | 0.120 | | | | | 0.120 | 11 Apr-21 |
| Cameroon | 3.912 | | | | | 3.912 | 12 Apr-21 |
| Mauritania | 0.696 | | | | | 0.696 | 12 Apr-21 |
| Albania | 0.500 | 0.500 | 16 April 2021 | | | | |
| Syria | 2.568 | | | | | 2.568 | 16 Apr-21 |
| Indonesia | 90.080 | | | 90.080 | (1.375 COVOVAX) 26 Nov 2021; (48.675 Covovax ) 01 Dec 2021; (40.03 COVOVAX) 07 Dec 2021 | | |
| Australia | 63.533 | | | 63.533 | (31.053 COVOVAX, brand name - NUVAXOVID) 05 Feb 2022; (32.48 COVOVAX, brand name - NUVAXOVID) 09 Feb 2022 | | |
| Netherlands | 289.830 | | | 289.830 | (30.605 COVOVAX )10 Jan 2022; (32.484 Covovax/Nuvaxovid 18 Jan 2022); (32.405 Covovax/Nuvaxovid 16 Jan 2022); (32.514 Covovax/Nuvaxovid 19 Jan 2022); (32.448 COVOVAX/NUVAXOVID) 23 Jan 2022; (32.381 Covovax/Novaxovid) 25 Jan 2022; (32.254 covovax/nuvaxovid) 27 Jan 2022); (32.499 Covovax/Nuvaxovid) 30 Jan 2022; (32.24 Covovax ) 08 Feb 2022 | | |

== International reaction ==
=== International organizations ===
- IMF: IMF chief economist Gita Gopinath lauded India for playing a key role during the crisis by dispatching vaccines to many countries. She said "I also want to mention that India really stands out in terms of its vaccine policy. If you look at where exactly is one manufacturing hub for vaccines in the world – that will be India."

=== Countries ===
- Jamaica of the OACPS has thanked Indian efforts in delivering vaccines to developing and least developed countries.
- Nepal Prime minister Khadga Prasad Oli thanked India stating; “We got an early chance to administer the Covid-19 vaccine. For this, I thank our neighbouring nation India, its government, the people, and especially Prime Minister Narendra Modi. They sent 10 lakh doses of vaccines to us as a grant within a week of the roll-out in India.”
- St. Lucia on behalf of CARICOM thanked India for providing vaccine supplies to them.
- Barbados Prime Minister Mia Amor Mottley thanked Prime Minister Narendra Modi for the supply of "Made in India" COVID-19 vaccines. She tweeted, "PM Modi made it possible for more than 40,000 persons in Barbados and tens of thousands elsewhere, to receive their 1st dose of COVISHIELD via Vaccine Maitri before receiving his. A genuine demonstration of generosity. Thank you and we wish you continued good health."
- Antigua and Barbuda Prime Minister Gaston Browne had thanked Prime Minister of India Narendra Modi "for demonstrating an act of benevolence, kindness and empathy", for sending vaccines to Caribbean countries.
- Afghanistan Afghanistan's ambassador to India Farid Mamundzay said "Thank you, India for providing Afghan people lifesaving gift on the first day of 2022!"

=== Leaders who received vaccines provided by India ===
- Cambodia – Heng Samrin, Say Chhum
- Nepal – KP Sharma Oli

== Gallery ==
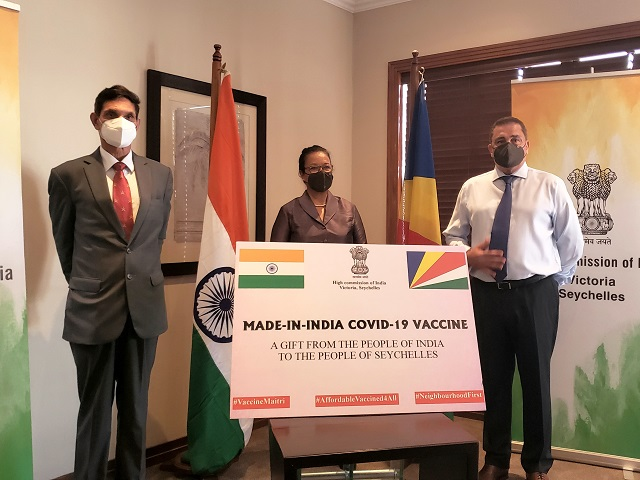
COVID-19 vaccine from India arrives at Seychelles.

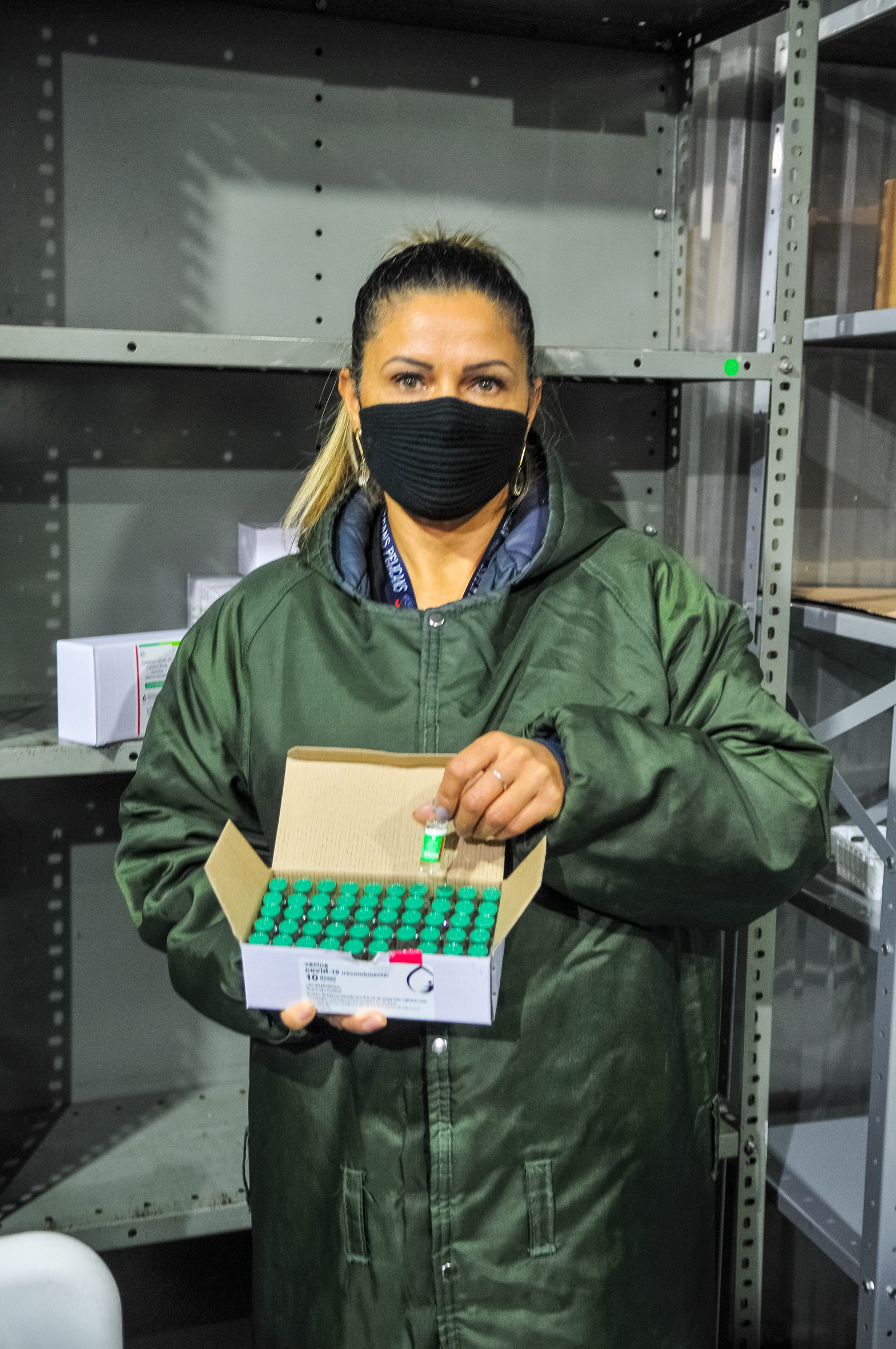
Delivery of Covishield COVID-19 vaccine from India to Brazil

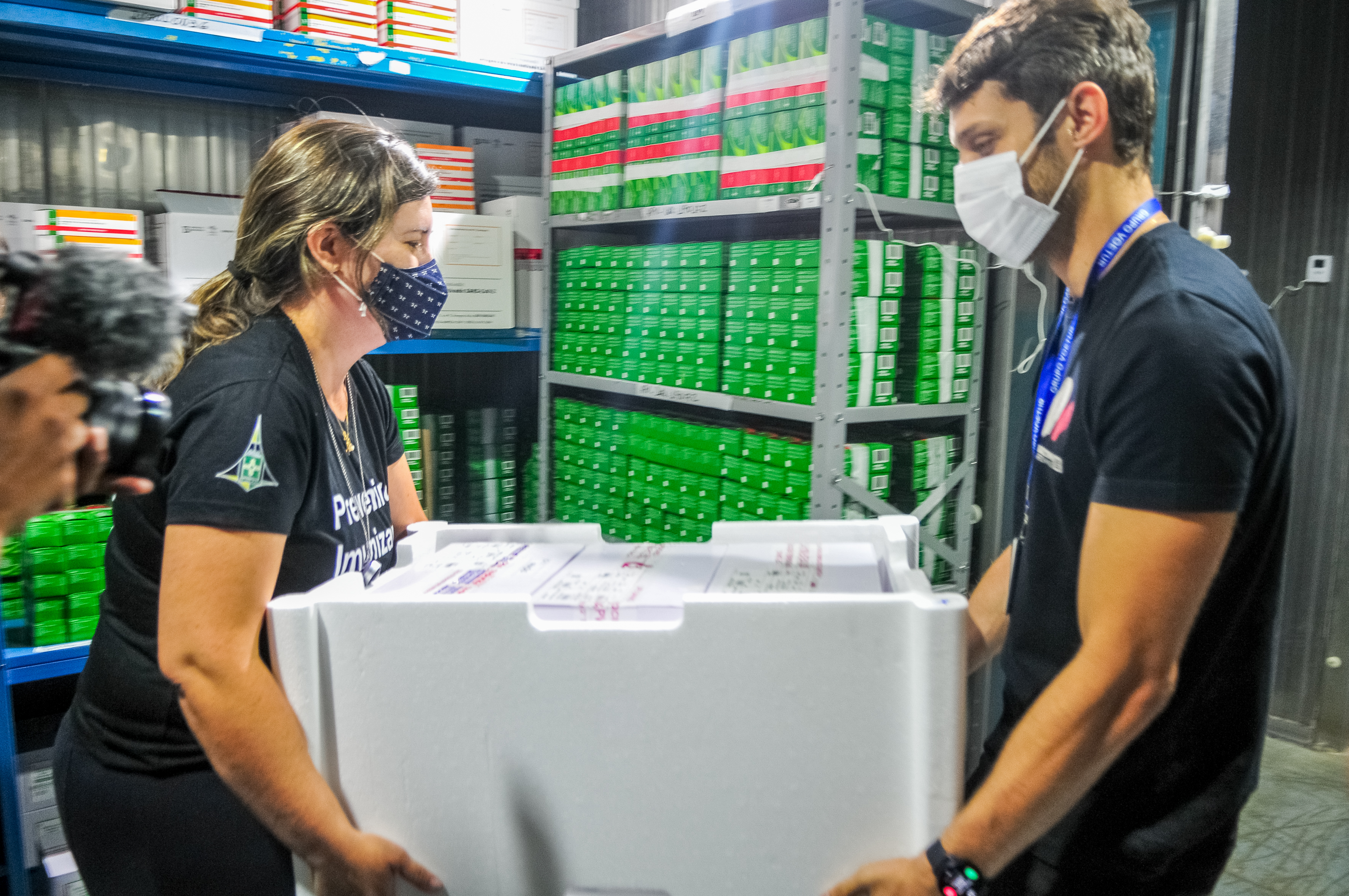
Delivery of Covishield COVID-19 vaccine from India to Brazil

== See also ==
- Vaccine diplomacy
- COVID-19 vaccination in India
