= Science diplomacy =

International scientific cooperation

Science diplomacy describes how scientific exchanges and the cross-border collaboration of scientists or scientific organizations can perform diplomatic functions in the context of international relations. Most often this diplomacy happens as part of scientific cooperation as a means of building relationships between states and within international organizations. Science diplomacy is a set of activities in which scientific, diplomatic, and other interests overlap and in which states, international organizations and non-state actors represent themselves and their interests. It is a global phenomenon.

Science diplomacy can include formal, informal, research-based, academic or engineering exchanges. It typically involves interactions between scientists and officials involved in diplomacy. Science diplomacy’s advocates note that science diplomacy aims to address common problems. However, science diplomacy can at times reify or accentuate asymmetrical power relations, and, especially in times of international conflict, it is sometimes unclear if and how the actual policies and associated organizations can meet the expectations placed on science diplomacy.

== Definitions ==
The concept of science diplomacy is of relatively recent origin. Attempts to define and classify practices as science diplomacy date from the beginning of the 21st century. Before the concept became popular, which happened in the West notably during the Obama administration, what might be thought of as science diplomacy initiatives were often referred to as "smart power" or "soft power". Along with e.g. economic, cultural, digital, data or para-diplomacy, science diplomacy can be understood as a subcategory of the so-called new diplomacy, as opposed to the traditional diplomacy known to date.

Today, historians use the term science diplomacy retrospectively as an analytical category to examine past forms and earlier developments, while the debate on contemporary science diplomacy initiatives involves scholars who treat it as an empirical object and actors who are or have been involved in science diplomacy practices. These are often career diplomats, science counsellors/advisers, or experts to national and international decision-making bodies and to politicians. Whether scientist diplomats or diplomat scientists are more effective is an open question. Science diplomacy was and is an area of activity in which multiple actors present diverse interests and interpretations.

Thus, there exists neither a clear-cut definition nor a consensus on science diplomacy's stakeholders, instruments and activities. Science diplomacy gains its meaning from a compilation of different narratives, approaches and ideas of changing and sometimes contested relations between science and foreign policy and the evolution of diplomacy and international relations per se. In 2010, a meeting of the Royal Society (RS) and the American Association for the Advancement of Science (AAAS) resulted in a widely used theoretical framework that describes three main types of activities:

- "Science in diplomacy": Science can provide advice to inform and support foreign policy objectives
- "Diplomacy for science": Diplomacy can facilitate international scientific cooperation
- "Science for diplomacy": Scientific cooperation can improve international relations

However, stress on this definition involving the above three categories can lead to an under-representation of the use of science for competitive or hegemonic purposes or even to a mystification of science as a complexity-reducing enterprise. Furthermore, scholars have argued that the definition fails to capture the subtle complexity of the science diplomacy phenomenon or the historical capacity of scientific and diplomatic outcomes to be co-produced. The theoretical framework of science diplomacy is under scrutiny. Most critics have emphasized the significant vulnerability of science as a public good.

Eurocentrism and a masculine bias have been identified as two hegemonic perspectives that shape definitions and characterizations of science diplomacy. Building on this critique, scholars have argued that the Global South remains underrepresented. To address blind spots, a growing body of scholarship attempts to "de-centre" the science diplomacy discourse. Literature has explicitly foregrounded the importance of Global South science diplomacy in intergovernmental organisations, "globalised" the perspective, or focused on world regions previously underrepresented. Similarly, scholars have observed that there is limited understanding of the workings of gender. To make science diplomacy definitions more inclusive, researchers have studied gendered dynamics and networks, and practices of exclusion and inclusion in male-dominated settings.

== History ==
Cross-border scientific negotiations on issues such as the environment, global health crises, and scientific intelligence gathering are not new concerns. The intersection of international affairs and scientific exchange has a long history. Even if not explicitly labeled as "science diplomacy" at the time, early forms were evident in the great voyages of exploration. Colonization, in particular, carried with it science-driven diplomacy and influence.

An early, widespread form of science diplomacy was advisory work to governments. In 1926, Sir Frank Heath, Secretary of the UK Department of Scientific Industry, recommended the Australian Government establish the Council for Scientific and Industrial Research to support industry and facilitate international scientific liaison. The government accepted his recommendations and appointed Frank Lidgett McDougall as Scientific Liaison Officer in London in 1927.

Notable forms of science diplomacy also emerged through scientific conferences and the creation of international organizations. In the 19th century, the growing specialization of scientific disciplines led experts to hold meetings to standardize methods, practices, and nomenclature. This resulted in the formation of the International Association of Academies (IAA) in 1899. European scientists also used their networks to influence discussions on the colonization of distant territories, such as during the Berlin Conference of 1884-1885. They had to navigate the dual role of advancing scientific progress while simultaneously leveraging national scientific superiority to support geopolitical expansion. After World War I, the IAA was reorganized to exclude German scientists due to their support of military actions, including the Manifesto of the Ninety-Three. The IAA's successor, the International Research Council (IRC), formed in 1919, continued to marginalize German participation. Efforts to reestablish contacts included the transformation of the IRC into the International Council of Scientific Unions (ICSU) in 1931. However, the onset of World War II disrupted cooperation among the scientific communities in the Global North, and meaningful collaboration was only restored in the late 1940s.

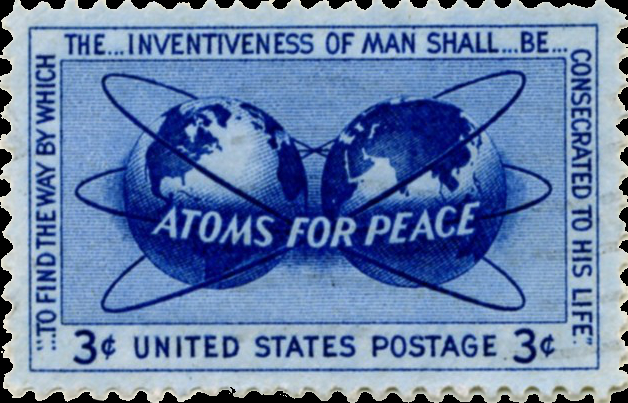
U.S. Stamp of 1955

After World War II, the first major science-based diplomatic initiative was the United Nations Atomic Energy Commission to stop an atomic arms race. The initiative failed, the Cold War begun, and in the 1950s the United States developed a separate program, the Atoms for Peace initiative, made famous by a conference held at the UN office at Geneva in 1955. Most importantly, the Atoms for Peace initiative provided the basis for the founding of the International Atomic Energy Agency (IAEA) in 1957. The IAEA engaged quickly in the promotion of science diplomacy initiatives. Its function has been and is to encourage cooperation while providing safeguards of nuclear technologies.

However, the United States was not the only country actively pursuing diplomatic initiatives in science. Atoms for Peace and the 1954 Castle Bravo thermonuclear weapons test contributed to Japan’s Ministry of Foreign Affairs intensifying its diplomatic activities on nuclear issues as part of a wider range of science-related activities, including initiating a science attaché program in 1954 and creating a dedicated Science Division in 1958.

The Cold War involved the development of strategic scientific relations as a way to promote cooperation to the extent that it could hedge against diplomatic failures and reduce the potential for conflict, with hegemonic interests informing science diplomacy practices. Collaborations linked the two Cold War blocs when official diplomatic connections were stalled. However, scientific exchange also offered an opportunity for intelligence gathering, including by the United States in Western Europe. Cold War science diplomacy was often to mediate the circulation of knowledge and materials, but also to create or rebuild exchange: In 1961, John F. Kennedy established a science and technology cooperation agreement with Japan following appeals to repair the "broken dialogue" between the two countries' intellectual communities. The agreement helped round out a tenuous relationship at the time rooted only in security concerns. Yet, even in the immediate post-World War II period, there were examples of US-Japan exchange, such as in the co-production and cooperation between Japanese scientists and American science administrators in the founding of the Science Council of Japan.

The emergence of Cold War power blocs also saw science and technology leveraged as tools for peacefully influencing other nations, particularly in areas like space exploration, geography, and the development of fission reactors. Technical assistance programs flourished, targeting the so-called "Third World", economically developing countries, and potential strategic allies. For example, Sino-Hungarian cooperation in geophysics developed amidst the radicalization of Chinese politics and the increasing tensions between the Soviet Union and the People’s Republic of China following 1956. These collaborations often reflected broader geopolitical shifts, with scientific exchanges serving as both a symbol of ideological alignment and a means of fostering international influence.

Developing countries also engaged in science diplomacy as part of cross-bloc competition, such as the People’s Republic of China using everything from the development of new flood control techniques in the 1950s to the launch of its first artificial satellite in 1970 as part of its “people’s diplomacy” strategies. Such science-related outreach was an important part of China’s foreign relations during the decades before its entry into the United Nations in 1971 and accompanying rapid expansion in its normalized diplomatic relations with other countries. Henry Kissinger requested, and took, several science initiatives to his talks with China. Scientists featured prominently in the early exchanges and initiatives that were a part of the Sino-American rapprochement process leading to normalization of relations in 1979. Exchanges related to science and technology were explicitly mentioned in the Shanghai Communiqué. The increasing participation of recently independent, de-colonizing countries in international technoscientific affairs illustrate fundamental but yet underexplored transitions in international affairs during and since the 1970s.

== Science diplomacy and international organizations ==
Logo of the UNESCO

Science diplomacy encompasses both the promotion of a state's interests and the collective effort to address global challenges and needs. As a tool for diplomacy, science has been, and continues to be, employed by governments worldwide. However, international organizations also play a critical role in promoting and advancing science diplomacy. This broader perspective positions science diplomacy as a form of networked and transnational governance, facilitated through platforms such as the United Nations, particularly within specialized agencies like UNESCO. Through collaborations with international scientific unions and national science organizations, the International Science Council (ISC)—formed in 2018 through the merger of the ICSU and the International Social Science Council (ISSC)—mobilizes resources and expertise to foster scientific solutions to pressing global issues.

The mission of the World Health Organization (WHO) is fundamentally rooted in science diplomacy. In collaboration with other international organizations, researchers, public health officials, governments, and clinicians, the WHO works to develop and implement effective strategies for infection control and treatment. Through joint efforts in medical diplomacy, the global community has gained access to essential vaccines. International cooperation has proven instrumental in addressing outbreaks of diseases such as SARS, Ebola, Zika, and continues to play a critical role in managing thechallenges posed by the COVID-19 pandemic.

In Europe, two international organizations with a scientific mission are widely considered as models for science diplomacy: At the end of World War II, Europe had to rebuild itself politically, economically, and in terms of scientific exchange. In this context, 12 countries joined to create the European Organization for Nuclear Research (CERN) in 1954, now hosted in Switzerland. At present, CERN is run by 23 member states, but many non-members are also involved in different ways. The second example is the International Thermonuclear Experimental Reactor (ITER), an engineering megaproject in France, which will be the world's largest magnetic confinement experiment when it begins plasma physics operations. ITER began in 1985 as a Reagan–Gorbachev initiative with the equal participation of the Soviet Union, the European Atomic Energy Community, the United States, and Japan, with the post-9/11 era posing a challenge on its continuation.

In the Middle East, a relevant example of science diplomacy put in practice is the Synchrotron-light for Experimental Science and Applications in the Middle East (SESAME). In the late 1990s, several countries joined to establish SESAME with the intention to foster scientific cooperation in a region of the world that has been torn by persistent conflicts. In 2019, the early promoters of SESAME received the Award for Science Diplomacy by the AAAS.

In South America, there is no consolidated international organisation dedicated to science and technology in the region, but there are important regional initiatives such as the science network CILAC. However, South American countries have been and continue to be involved in and contribute to international exchange networks. Particularly in the field of astronomy, Chile had the intention of promoting the concept of a natural laboratory, pointing to the country's good conditions for international scientific research.

In some cases, science diplomacy is not the primary goal of international organizations but serves as an important tool. For example, the European Union fosters scientific collaboration as a form of diplomacy through "parallel means", with several EU-funded projects. Similarly, the intergovernmental military alliance NATO established a Science Committee and the position of Science Advisor in 1958. NATO has used science promotion as a diplomatic channel (or "backchannel") particularly during critical moments in the alliance's history.

== Science diplomacy and non-state actors ==
Non-state actors also practice science diplomacy. The World Federation of Scientific Workers (an NGO in official partnership with UNESCO), founded in 1946, provides an important platform for international scientific exchange. Its agenda has addressed key issues such as the social responsibility of scientists and disarmament. Another notable example of science diplomacy by non-state actors occurred in 1957, when philanthropist Cyrus Eaton hosted a historic meeting in Pugwash, Canada. The gathering was inspired by a Manifesto issued by Bertrand Russell and Albert Einstein, which called on scientists from all political backgrounds to unite and discuss the existential threat posed by the development of thermonuclear weapons. This event marked the beginning of the Pugwash Conferences, which would continue to convene and later attract the attention of high-ranking government officials. In 1958, the Pugwash movement sought to influence the policies of the IAEA, contributing to the formation of the international nuclear order. Over time, Pugwash committees were established in both Eastern and Western blocs, further expanding the reach of this initiative.

Such informal, non-governmental initiatives illustrate Track II science diplomacy, which is based on the informal transnational exchange of information without an official national negotiating mandate. Track II consists of informal dialogues among actors that can bring new ideas or relationships to the official process of diplomacy. Public pressure groups or individuals can have an impact on governmental decisions: For example, the work of Norman Cousins, editor of The Saturday Review of Literature, helped move the 1963 Limited Nuclear Test Ban Treaty forward. A specific form of Track II science diplomacy is activism and advocacy "from below" the elitist sphere of government advice. Such grassroots initiatives, e.g., Science for the People, were evident during the Vietnam War, when many Western academics protested against the misuse of science for warfare, campaigning for principles of global social justice. Scientists and physicians were also acting beyond state regulation and outside of official diplomatic arenas by researching and exposing the extent of harm done to the Vietnamese people in the war zones.

Similar to the initiative of non-state actors, non-profit organizations can exercise science diplomacy. For example, the Malta Conferences Foundation seeks to provide a bridge to peace in the Middle East. A relevant African science diplomacy actor is the African Scientific Institute, created in 1967 to help scientists reach others through published materials, conferences, seminars and to provide tools for those who lack them. A similar initiative has been launched by CRDF Global in partnership with the U.S. Department of State, the Global Innovation through Science and Technology (GIST). CRDF Global has been active on promoting science diplomacy through conferences, panel discussions and programs including the Iraqi Virtual Science Library, Maghreb Virtual Science Library, and the Afghanistan Virtual Science Library. Another examples is the Center for Science Diplomacy, established by the American Association for the Advancement of Science (AAAS). It provides a forum for scientists, policy analysts, and policy-makers to share information and explore collaborative opportunities. In March 2012, the center launched the quarterly publication Science & Diplomacy. Others non-profit organizations, such as the Science and Development Network (SciDev.Net) have dedicated an entire portion of their website for science diplomacy related articles and events.

== Science diplomacy applied to space, oceans, and the polar regions ==
Geostrategies often extend beyond land boundaries, particularly with regard to resources. Science diplomacy, as a tool for conducting diplomatic functions within international relations, reaches beyond human-inhabited territories and plays a key role in expressing competitive or collaborative interests in space, oceans, and polar regions.

A notable example of competition is the race to explore the Moon. After the 1957 Sputnik schock, it led to the establishment of the American space and aeronautics agency NASA. With the rise of privatized space exploration and increasing global competition in the new age space race, Space diplomacy refers to the collaborative efforts of scientists, national governments, and private companies to establish safe, effective, and sustainable space travel practices. It also involves discussions on space jurisdiction, environmental concerns, and international laws, such as the Outer Space Treaty.

Oceans have long been significant in international relations. In the 1950s, the Eisenhower Administration promoted international collaboration in ocean science as a means to strengthen the (propagated) Free World. Similarly, the French government acknowledged the strategic importance of ocean exploration.

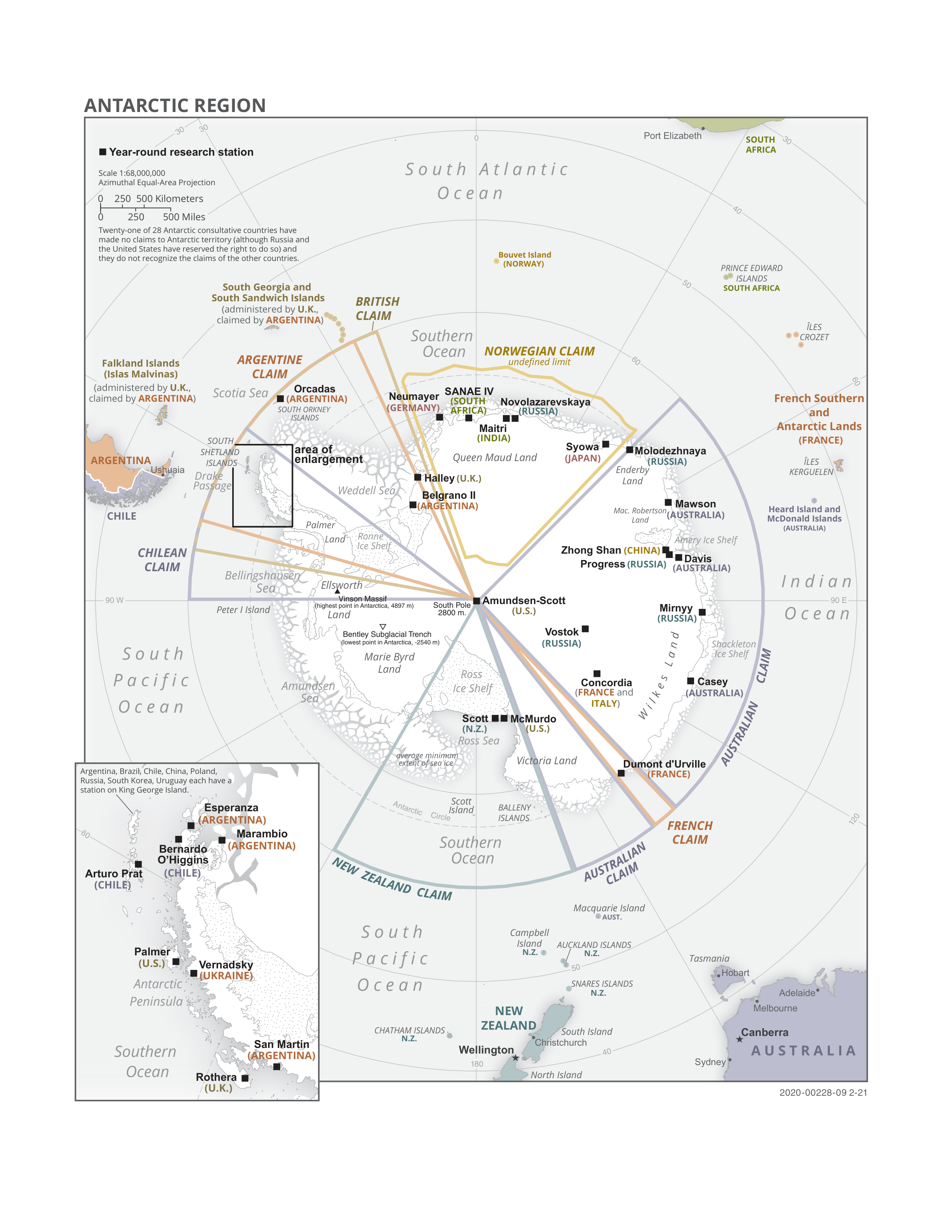
Political Map of the Antarctic Region

The importance of coordinating polar science efforts was first recognized in 1879, but it was the 1959 signing of the Antarctic Treaty that demonstrated how international scientific collaboration can influence geopolitics in the polar regions. The treaty emphasized the role of science in managing international spaces beyond sovereign, stipulating that parties freeze their territorial claims over Antarctica as long as scientific activities continue. This framework emerged from the International Geophysical Year (1957–1958), which marked the first comprehensive scientific exploration of Antarctica.

For proponents of science diplomacy, such as organizations like the RS/AAAS, the Antarctic illustrates that scientific collaboration can foster positive diplomatic outcomes and effective governance of shared spaces. The treaty helped resolve territorial disputes, particularly between the UK, Argentina, and Chile over overlapping claims in Antarctica, including the contested Antarctic Peninsula. It also prevented the establishment of nuclear facilities, averting the nuclearization of the Southern Hemisphere.

However, critics argue that the Antarctic Treaty did not establish an egalitarian system of governance. It was a diplomatic tool to manage competing territorial claims and prevent nuclear conflict, rather than addressing colonial legacies. It has been criticized for reconfiguring colonial practices in the post-colonial era. Notably, India's request for UN-administered trusteeship over Antarctica was rejected. Additionally, the treaty system was not subject to United Nations oversight and excluded non-signatory states. The United States, for example, had unprecedented logistical support. During the Cold War, countries seeking to collaborate on Antarctic research had to coordinate with the United States, tying scientific cooperation to political alliances.

The Arctic has also long been shaped by international political, economic, and security dynamics. In 1996, nations with interests in the region established the Arctic Council to address issues of sustainable development and environmental protection.

== Science diplomacy in the 21st century ==
In December 2018, the “Madrid Declaration on Science Diplomacy” was signed by a group of high-level experts. It proclaims a common vision of science diplomacy in the future, emphasises the benefits science diplomacy can bring to tackling the global challenges of our time and outlines the principles needed to foster science diplomacy worldwide.

Today, many of the global challenges related to health, economic growth, and climate change lay at the intersection of science and international relations. There is also long list of specific themes for science diplomacy to address, including “the rising risks and dangers of climate change, a spread of infectious diseases, increasing energy costs, migration movements, and cultural clashes”. Other areas of interest include space exploration; the exploration of fundamental physics (e.g., CERN and ITER); the management of the polar regions; health research; the oil and mining sectors; fisheries; and international security, including global cybersecurity, as well as enormous geographic areas, such as the transatlantic and Indo-Pacific regions. Increasingly, science diplomacy has come to be seen as a multilateral endeavor to address both global challenges and the matter of global goods, via science internationals (such as the Malta Conferences); international NGOs, especially UN bodies; and various science-policy interfaces, such as the U.S. National Academies system.

Science diplomacy suggests a means for helping manage paradigmatic and disruptive change. For instance, the sheer scale of the problem of climate change has caused researchers to call for the reinvention of science communication in order to address humanity's cognitive limits in coping with such a crisis, with the International Panel on Climate Change alone constituting a science-diplomacy nexus. Especially within the context of the Sustainable Development Goals, the first calls to begin seeing science and its products as global public goods which should be tasked to fundamentally improve the human condition, especially in countries which are facing catastrophic change, are being made. While both science and technology create new risks in and of themselves, they can also alert humanity of risks, such as global warming, in both cases transforming commerce, diplomacy, intelligence, investment, and war. Science diplomacy challenges the way international relations operates as a field of human endeavor.

Science diplomacy plays a key role as means of global security. In 2009, President Barack Obama called for partnership during his “A New Beginning” speech in Cairo, Egypt. These partnerships would include a greater focus on engagement of the Muslim world through science, technology, and innovation. Other strategies that evolved at that time involved the development of scientific relations between historical or potential rival countries or blocs as a way to promote scientific cooperation to the extent that it could hedge against diplomatic failures and reduce the potential for conflict. On March 12, 2010, Congressman Howard Berman (D-CA) and Congressman Jeff Fortenberry (R-NE) introduced the Global Science Program for Security, Competitiveness, and Diplomacy Act, which proposed an increase in the application of science and scientific engagement in US foreign policy.

Whereas science diplomacy is frequently considered a soft power tool which helps to keep dialogue lines open between states in conflict and can contribute to peacekeeping and international understanding, in times of war, science diplomacy seems to fall within the arsenal of hard power: this became most evident in the Russian invasion of Ukraine. Sanctions are a key tool in science diplomacy to address conflicts. For instance, CERN suspend its exchange programs with Russia and Belarus in 2024.

== See also ==
- Atoms for Peace
- World Peace Council
- Montreal Protocol
- Paris Agreement
- Munich Security Conference
- Soft power and Hard power
- UNESCO
- International Science Council
- Pugwash Conferences on Science and World Affairs
- World Federation of Scientific Workers
