= Maghreb Virtual Science Library =

Platform providing full-text access to science journals to researchers in the Maghreb

The Maghreb Virtual Science Library (MVSL) (la Bibliothèque numérique des sciences du Maghreb المكتبة العلمية الافتراضية المغاربية ) provided full-text access to thousands of science and engineering journals and databases to researchers in the Maghreb via digital library portals. It was a project funded by the U.S. Department of State Bureau of Oceans & International Environmental and Scientific Affairs, and is implemented by CRDF Global along with IMIST (Institut Marocain de l'Information Scientifique et Technique), LibHub, Research4Life, and JSTOR.

The Maghreb Virtual Science Library program is an initiative of CRDF Global.

== Description ==
The Maghreb Virtual Science Library (MVSL) Program provides full-text access to thousands of science and engineering journals and databases to researchers in the Maghreb, improves the international dissemination of research from the region, and supports new online tools for discovering and working with collaborators in the Maghreb. The most visible parts of the MVSL Program are the MVSL [maghrebvsl.org website] and the national portals where each country's full text journal articles can be comprehensively searched and accessed. Behind the scenes, the MVSL program includes consultations and workshops involving all of the implementing partners to assure that the users are supported to get the most from the system and to assure that the web-based systems are operating smoothly.

== Countries ==
Although the MVSL Program is initially working with Morocco, Algeria, and Tunisia, the Program will expand to include Mauritania, and, as circumstances and funding permit, Libya.

Mauritanian researchers established a Center for Research in Renewable Energy at the University of Nouakchott and received an international award for malaria research. Science and engineering students in Mauritania account for more than 1/3 of university degree program enrollments.

In Libya, scientists have transformed the research base to focus on addressing national and regional challenges in areas such water resources, renewable energy, and medicine

== Open Access ==
The MVSL Open portal is a free gateway for everyone in the Maghreb to access to a wide range of research publications and databases usually available only within universities. The topics covered range from law, history, and music to business planning, finance, patent searching, and the latest scientific discoveries. MVSL Open uses leading-edge searching and indexing software to provide easy access to the full text of current research from all over the world.

There is no cost to use the MVSL Open site, and there are no membership or affiliation restrictions
